= Watkins 27 =

Sailboat class

Development
- Designer: Walter Scott
- Location: United States
- Year: 1977
- No. built: 514
- Builder: Watkins Yachts
- Name: Watkins 27

Boat
- Displacement: 7,500 lb (3,402 kg)
- Draft: 3.67 ft (1.12 m)

Hull
- Type: Monohull
- Construction: Fiberglass
- LOA: 27.00 ft (8.23 m)
- LWL: 23.67 ft (7.21 m)
- Beam: 10.00 ft (3.05 m)
- Engine: Yanmar diesel engine

Hull appendages
- Keel: shoal-draft fin keel
- Ballast: 3,500 lb (1,588 kg)
- Rudder: skeg-mounted rudder

Rig
- Rig type: Bermuda rig
- I foretriangle height: 34.80 ft (10.61 m)
- J foretriangle base: 11.00 ft (3.35 m)
- P mainsail luff: 30.00 ft (9.14 m)
- E mainsail foot: 10.75 ft (3.28 m)

Sails
- Sailplan: Masthead sloop
- Mainsail area: 161.25 sq ft (14.981 m^{2})
- Jib/genoa area: 191.40 sq ft (17.782 m^{2})
- Total sail area: 352.65 sq ft (32.762 m^{2})

The Watkins 27, also known as the W27, is an American sailboat that was designed by naval architect Walter Scott and first built in 1977.

The Watkins 27 design was developed into the pilothouse Watkins 27P in 1981, although only seven of that model were built.

== Production ==
The design was built by Watkins Yachts in Clearwater, Florida, United States from 1977 to 1984. During the first full year of production, 1978, the company delivered more than 160 of the model, although production dropped to about 100 boats in the following year, 1979. With 514 completed it became the company's most successful and longest model in production.

== Design ==
The Watkins 27 is a recreational keelboat, built predominantly of polyester resin-based fiberglass, with teak wood trim. Plywood coring is used in the structures of the cabin roof, the deck, seats and cockpit sole for additional stiffness. It has a masthead sloop rig with 6061-T6 aluminum spars, a raked stem, a vertical transom, a skeg-mounted rudder controlled by an Edson-built wheel and a centerboard with stub keel or optional fixed fin keel in deep or shoal lengths. It displaces 7,500 lb (3,402 kg) and carries 3,500 lb (1,588 kg) of ballast.

The shoal keel-equipped version of the boat has a draft of 3.67 ft (1.12 m), while the centerboard-equipped version has a draft of 6.50 ft (1.98 m) with the centerboard extended and 2.75 ft (0.84 m) with it retracted. The fixed keel model was created by adding a shoe to the bottom of the centerboard stub keel and filling in the centerboard trunk. Even though the centerboard was standard and the fixed keel optional, mostly buyers specified the fixed shoal-draft keel and the centerboard and deep keel models are rare. Only five of the centerboard models were built.

The boat is fitted with a Japanese Yanmar diesel engine. A number of Yanmar engine models were used, including the YSB8, YSB12, YSE8, YSE12, YSM8, YSM12 and the 22 hp (16 kW) 2QM. After 1980 the 1GM and 2GM models were employed. The fuel tank holds 20 U.S. gallons (76 L; 17 imp gal) and the fresh water tank has a capacity of 40 U.S. gallons (150 L; 33 imp gal).

Sleeping accommodation is provided for five people and consists of a bow "V" berth, a main cabin settee berth and a double-sized quarter berth. The head is fully enclosed and located to port aft of the forward cabin. The galley is aft, on the starboard side and includes an icebox and a two-burner alcohol or gas-fired stove mounted on gimbals. Ventilation is provided by six opening ports and two hatches, although some early boats delivered had two or more non-opening ports. The main cabin has 74 in (188 cm) of standing headroom. All woodwork is teak, including the cabin accents, bulkheads and the cabinets, which are teak veneer over plywood. The cabin sole is a teak parquet design.

There is an anchor locker forward. The Edson pedestal-mounted wheel steering system drivings stainless steel cables, which rotate a quadrant that is bolted and keyed to the rudder post. The sail controls include a main sheet attached to the rear bridge deck on 1978 and 1979 models. After that the boats were delivered with mid-boom sheeting, using two blocks on either side of the cabin roof. The electrical system consists of two 12v batteries mounted in parallel and charged by the engine alternator.

The design has a hull speed of 6.52 kn (12.08 km/h).

== Operational history ==
The boat is supported by an active class club, the Watkins Owners.

The design competed successfully in the market with the Catalina 27, offering better hardware and construction at similar price.

== See also ==
- List of sailing boat types

Related development

- Watkins 27P

Similar sailboats

- Aloha 27
- Cal 27
- Cal 2-27
- Cal 3-27
- Catalina 27
- C&C 27
- Crown 28
- CS 27
- Edel 820
- Express 27
- Fantasia 27
- Halman Horizon
- Hotfoot 27
- Hullmaster 27
- Hunter 27
- Hunter 27-2
- Irwin 27
- Island Packet 27
- Mirage 27 (Perry)
- Mirage 27 (Schmidt)
- Mirage 275
- O'Day 272
- Orion 27-2
