= Hunter 27-2 =

Sailboat class

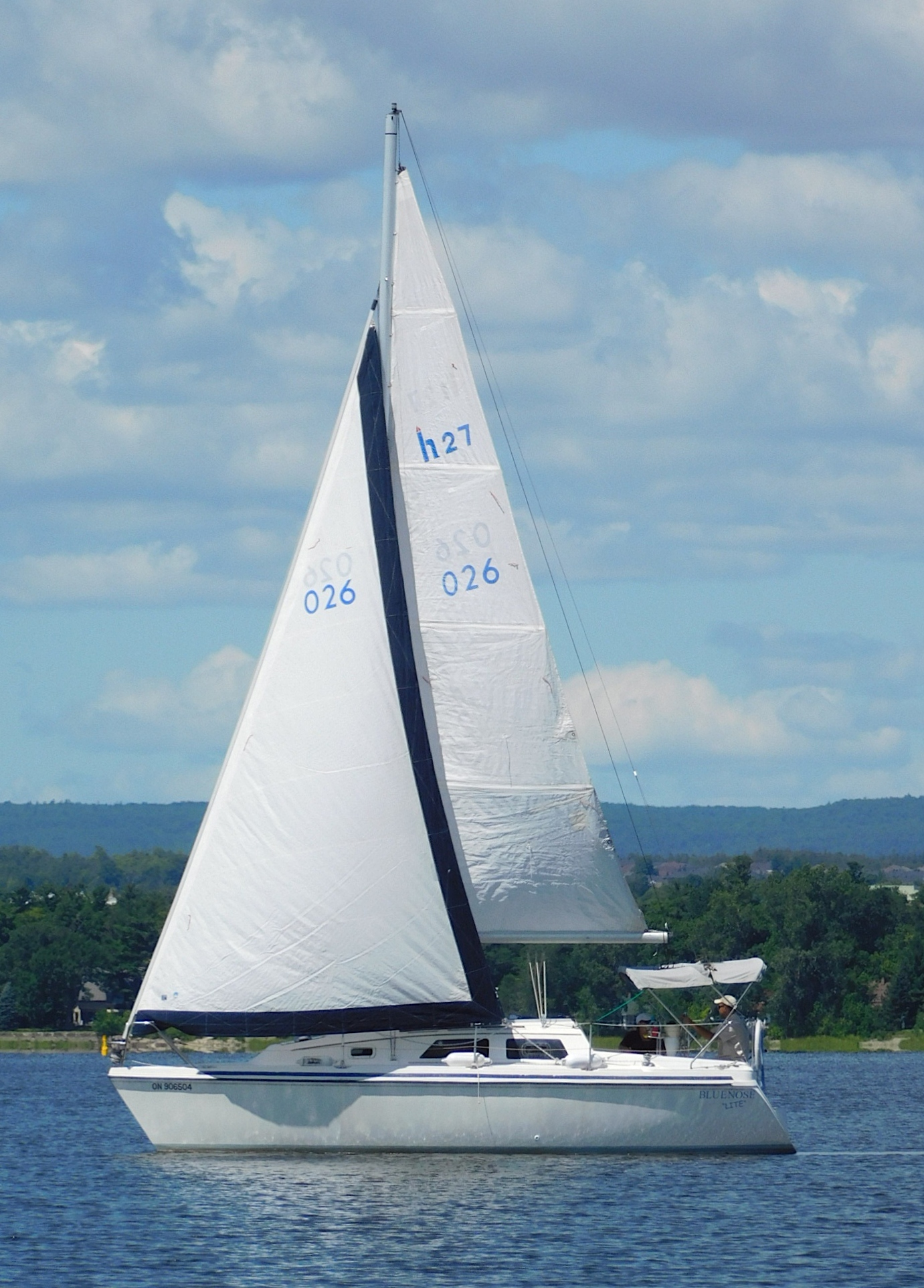

Development
- Designer: Hunter Design Team
- Location: United States
- Year: 1989
- Builder: Hunter Marine
- Name: Hunter 27-2

Boat
- Displacement: 5,000 lb (2,268 kg)
- Draft: 3.50 ft (1.07 m)

Hull
- Type: Monohull
- Construction: Fiberglass
- LOA: 26.58 ft (8.10 m)
- LWL: 22.42 ft (6.83 m)
- Beam: 9.00 ft (2.74 m)
- Engine: Outboard motor or optional Yanmar 1GM-10 diesel engine

Hull appendages
- Keel: wing keel
- Ballast: 2,000 lb (907 kg)
- Rudder: internally-mounted spade-type rudder

Rig
- Rig type: Bermuda rig
- I foretriangle height: 29.35 ft (8.95 m)
- J foretriangle base: 9.67 ft (2.95 m)
- P mainsail luff: 30.50 ft (9.30 m)
- E mainsail foot: 10.83 ft (3.30 m)

Sails
- Sailplan: Fractional rigged sloop
- Mainsail area: 165.16 sq ft (15.344 m^{2})
- Jib/genoa area: 141.91 sq ft (13.184 m^{2})
- Total sail area: 307.06 sq ft (28.527 m^{2})

Racing
- PHRF: 192 (average)

The Hunter 27-2 is an American sailboat that was designed by the Hunter Design Team as a family cruiser and first built in 1989.

The design was originally marketed by the manufacturer as the Hunter 27, but is now usually referred to as the Hunter 27-2 to differentiate it from the unrelated 1974 Hunter 27 and later designs with the same name.

== Production ==
The Hunter 27-2 was built by Hunter Marine in the United States between 1989 and 1994, but it is now out of production.

== Design ==
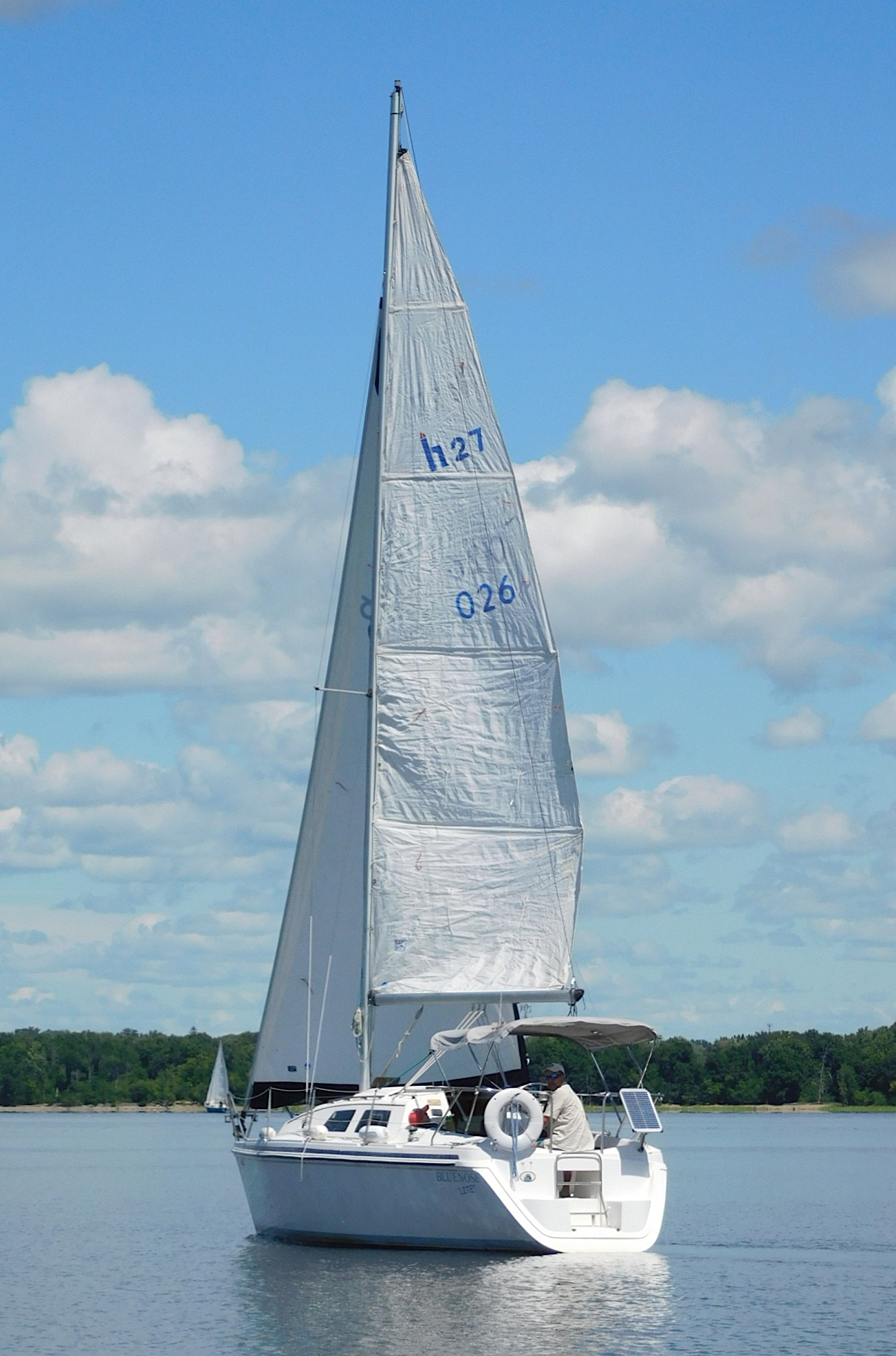
Hunter 27-2, showing the walk-through transom design

The Hunter 27-2 is a recreational keelboat, built predominantly of fiberglass, with wood trim. It has a fractional sloop rig with swept-back spreaders, a raked stem, a walk-through reverse transom with a swimming platform, an internally-mounted spade-type rudder controlled by a wheel, with an emergency tiller and a fixed wing keel. It displaces 5,000 lb (2,268 kg) and carries 2,000 lb (907 kg) of ballast. The boat has a draft of 3.50 ft (1.07 m) with the standard wing keel fitted.

The boat is normally fitted with a small 8 hp (6 kW) outboard motor for docking and maneuvering, although a Japanese Yanmar 1GM-10 9 hp (7 kW) diesel engine was a factory option.

The boat was delivered with many features as standard equipment, including a 110% genoa, stainless steel swim ladder, teak and holly interior, dinette table, enclosed head with a shower and sink with hot and cold water, two-burner stove, sleeping accommodation for six people, two life jackets, automatic bilge pump and a fog bell.

The design has a PHRF racing average handicap of 192 with a high of 186 and low of 201. It has a hull speed of 6.34 kn (11.74 km/h).

== See also ==
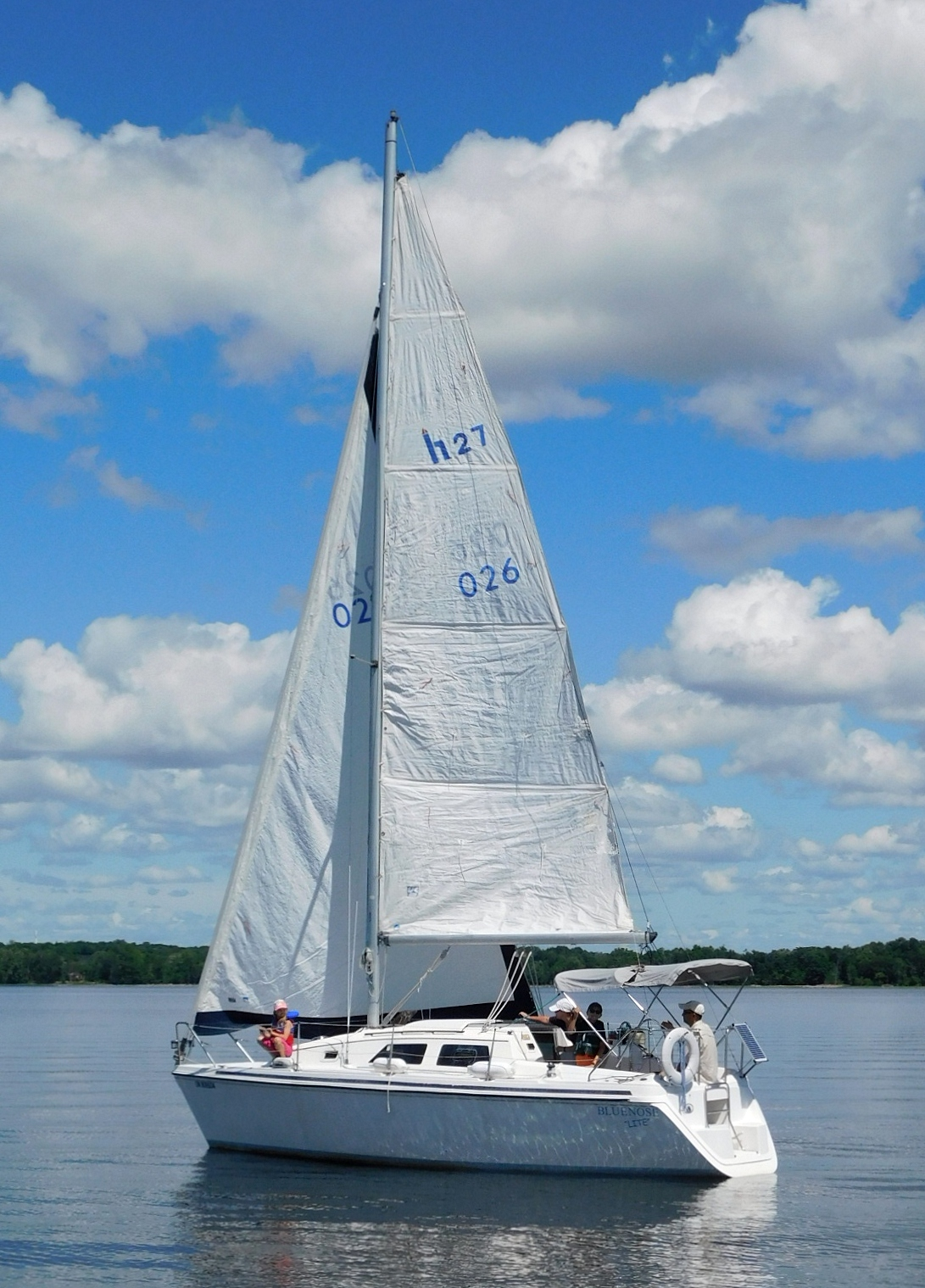
Hunter 27-2

- List of sailing boat types

Related development

- Hunter 27
- Hunter 27-3
- Hunter 27 Edge

Similar sailboats

- Aloha 27
- C&C 27
- Cal 27
- Cal 2-27
- Cal 3-27
- Catalina 27
- Catalina 270
- Catalina 275 Sport
- Crown 28
- CS 27
- Edel 820
- Express 27
- Fantasia 27
- Halman Horizon
- Hotfoot 27
- Hullmaster 27
- Irwin 27
- Island Packet 27
- Mirage 27 (Perry)
- Mirage 27 (Schmidt)
- Mirage 275
- O'Day 272
- Orion 27-2
- Tanzer 27
- Watkins 27
- Watkins 27P
