= Mirage 29 =

1980s Canadian recreational keelboat

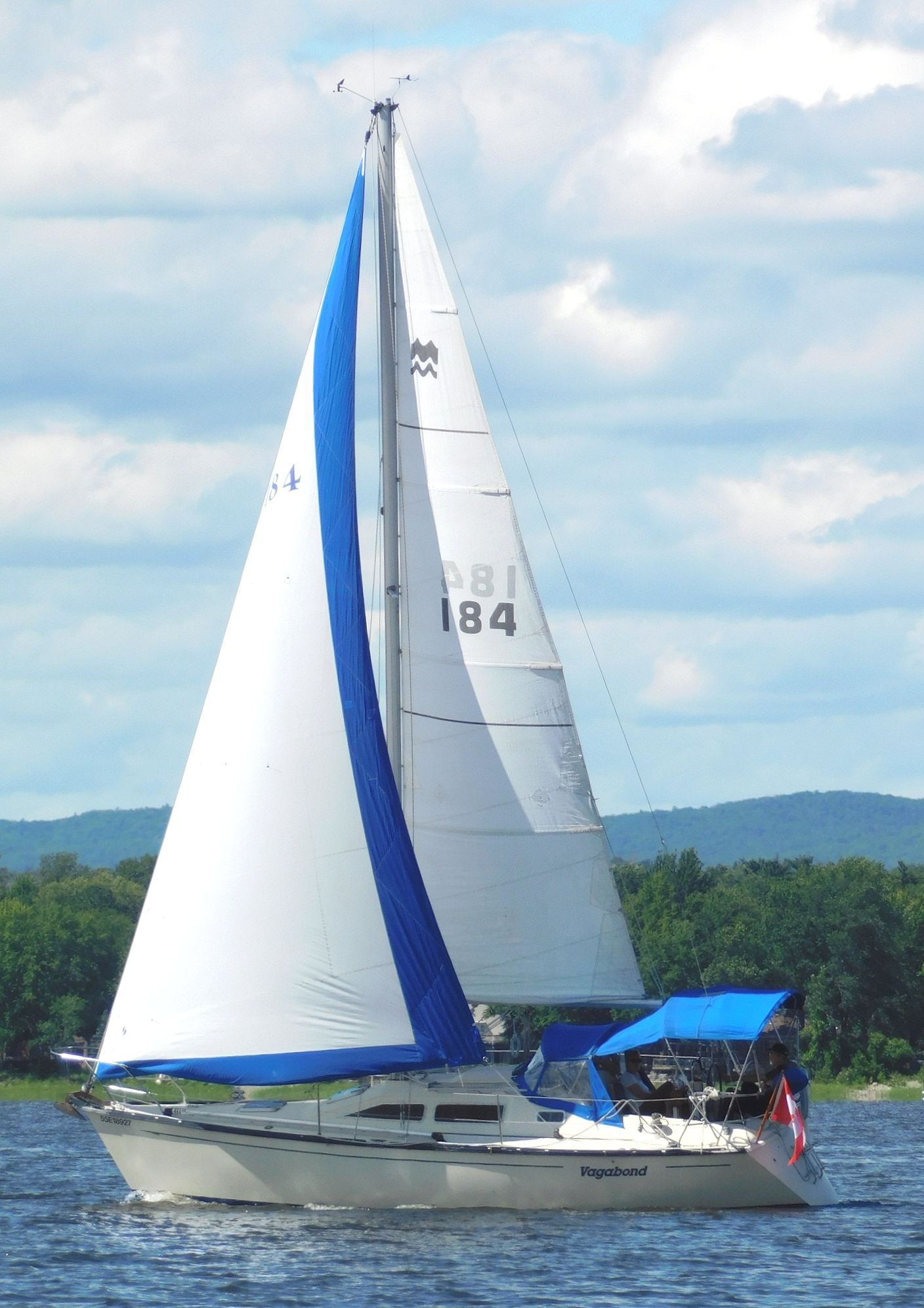

Development
- Designer: Philippe Harlé
- Location: Canada
- Year: 1986
- No. built: 290
- Builder: Mirage Yachts
- Name: Mirage 29

Boat
- Displacement: 6,800 lb (3,084 kg)
- Draft: 4.83 ft (1.47 m)

Hull
- Type: Monohull
- Construction: Fiberglass
- LOA: 29.00 ft (8.84 m)
- LWL: 24.25 ft (7.39 m)
- Beam: 10.50 ft (3.20 m)
- Engine: Volvo 18 hp (13 kW) diesel engine

Hull appendages
- Keel: fin keel
- Ballast: 2,300 lb (1,043 kg)
- Rudder: internally-mounted spade-type rudder

Rig
- General: Masthead sloop
- I foretriangle height: 37.40 ft (11.40 m)
- J foretriangle base: 11.80 ft (3.60 m)
- P mainsail luff: 32.50 ft (9.91 m)
- E mainsail foot: 9.50 ft (2.90 m)

Sails
- Mainsail area: 154.38 sq ft (14.342 m^{2})
- Jib/genoa area: 220.66 sq ft (20.500 m^{2})
- Total sail area: 375.04 sq ft (34.842 m^{2})

The Mirage 29 is a recreational keelboat built by Mirage Yachts in Canada, which completed 290 examples, starting in 1986, but it is now out of production.

Mirage Yachts was looking for a newer design to replace the Mirage 27. Philippe Harlé was selected and the new design was introduced in the spring of 1986, with 50 boats sold before the first one had been delivered and 290 built in total. Harlé went onto design the Mirage 275 in 1986 and Mirage 39 in 1989.

The fiberglass hull has an internally-mounted spade-type rudder and a fixed fin keel.

The boat is fitted with a Volvo diesel engine of 18 hp (13 kW). The fuel tank holds 10 U.S. gallons (38 L; 8.3 imp gal) and the fresh water tank also has a capacity of 10 U.S. gallons (38 L; 8.3 imp gal).

The boat has a hull speed of 6.6 kn (12.22 km/h).

It has an enclosed aft cabin.

== Gallery ==
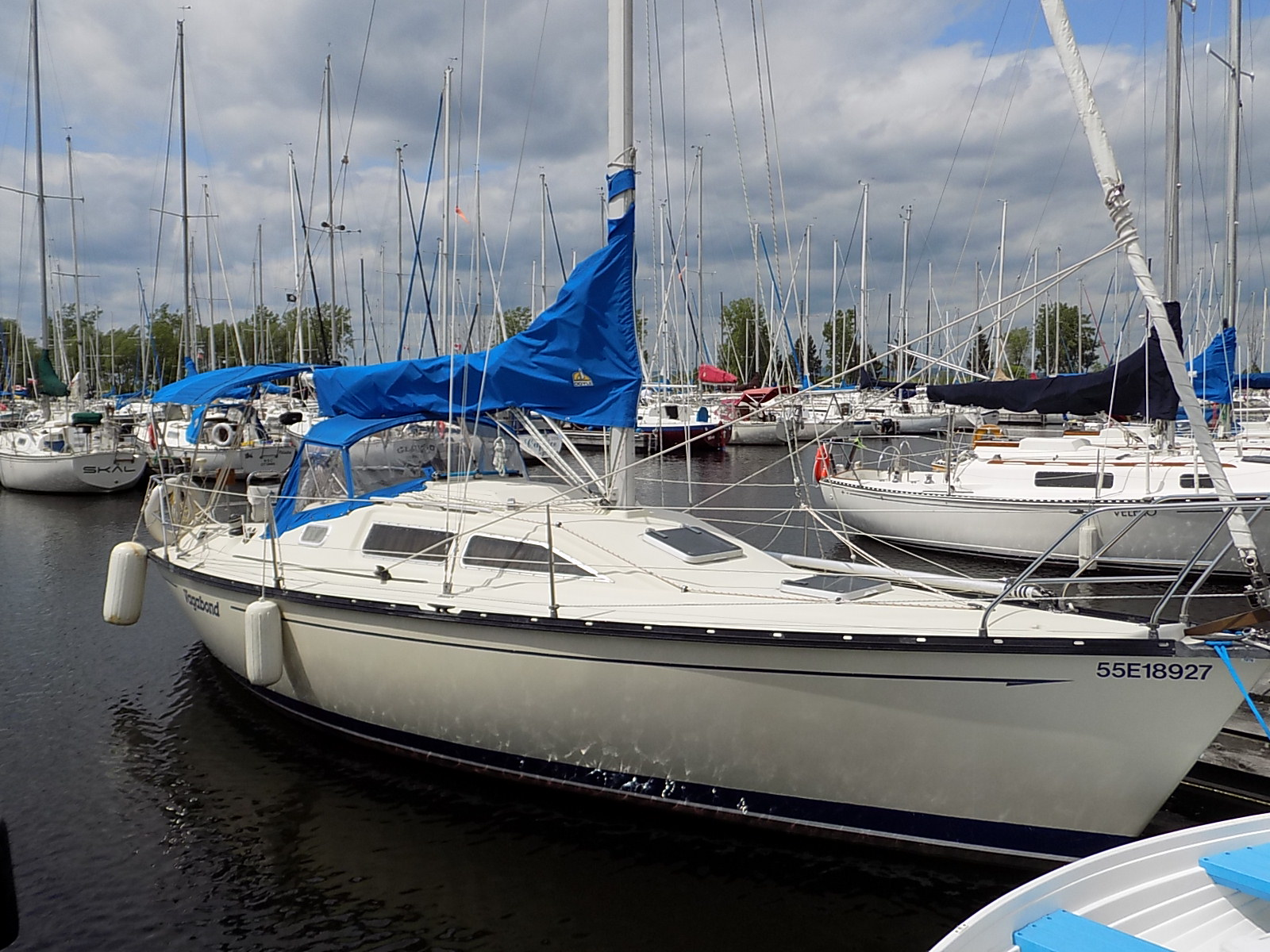
Mirage 29

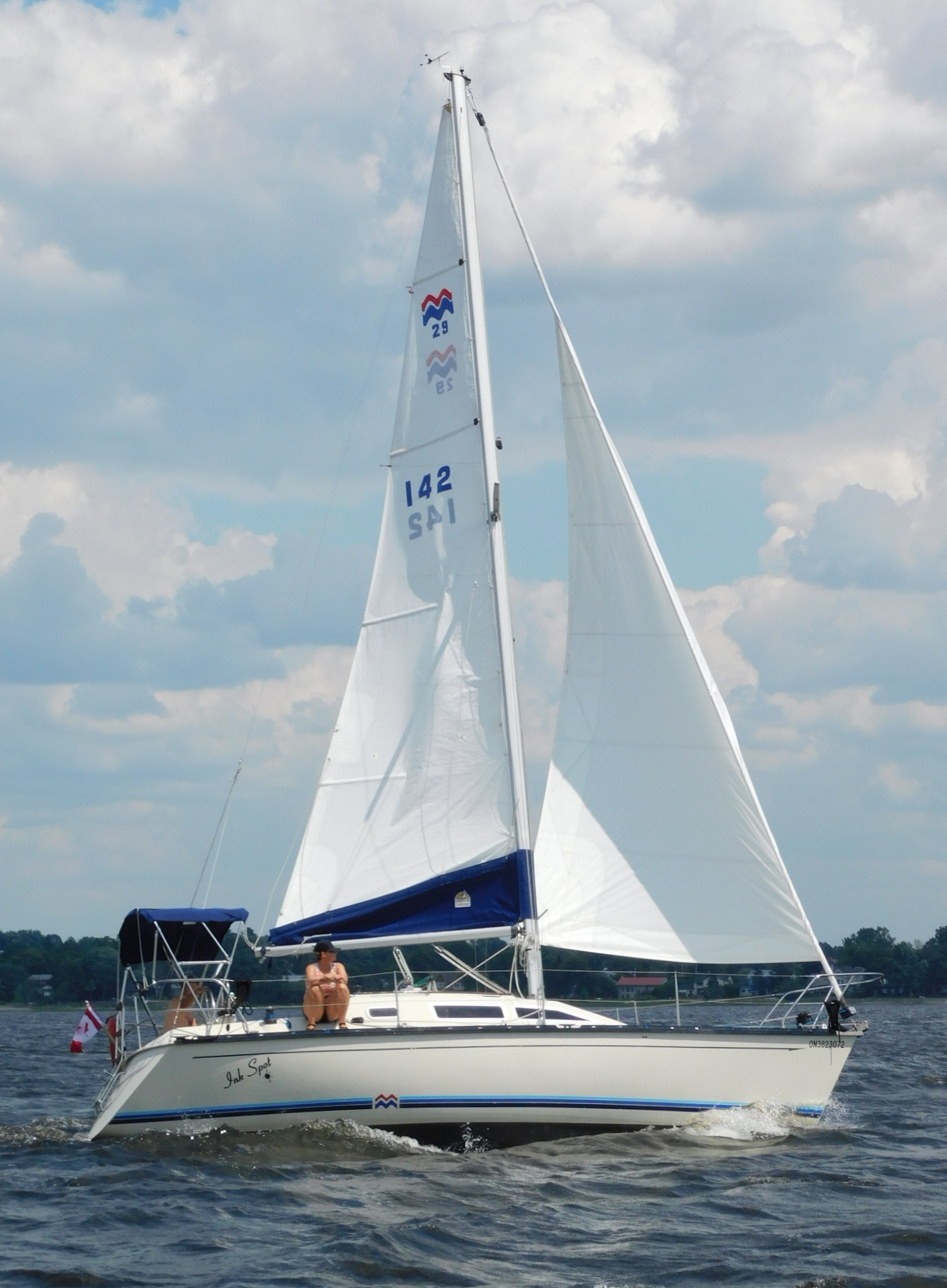
Mirage 29

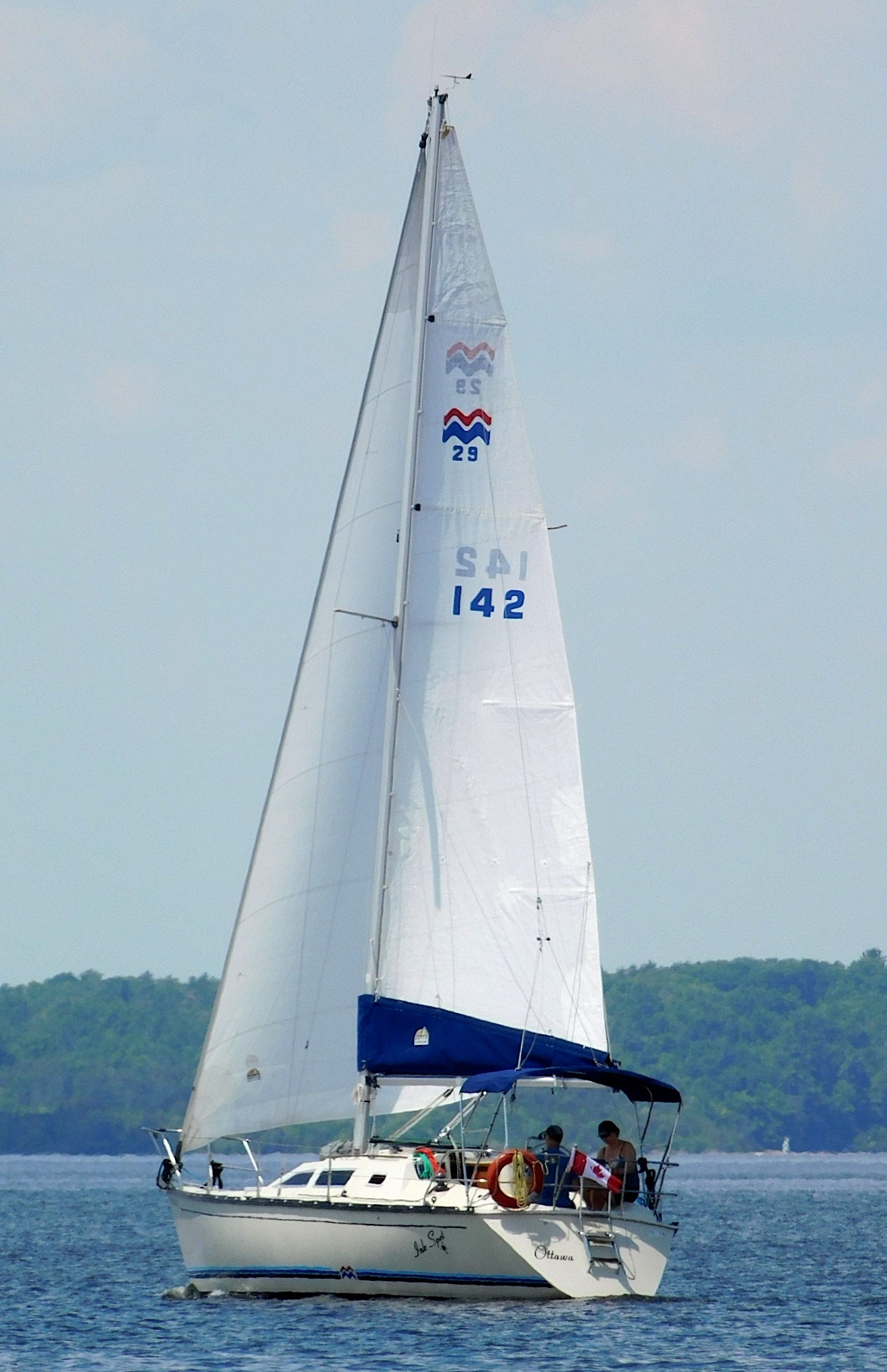
Mirage 29
