= Mirage 27 =

Mirage 27 may refer to either of two boat designs produced by Mirage Yachts under the same name:

- Mirage 27 (Perry)
- Mirage 27 (Schmidt)
