= Mirage 30 =

1980s Canadian recreational keelboat

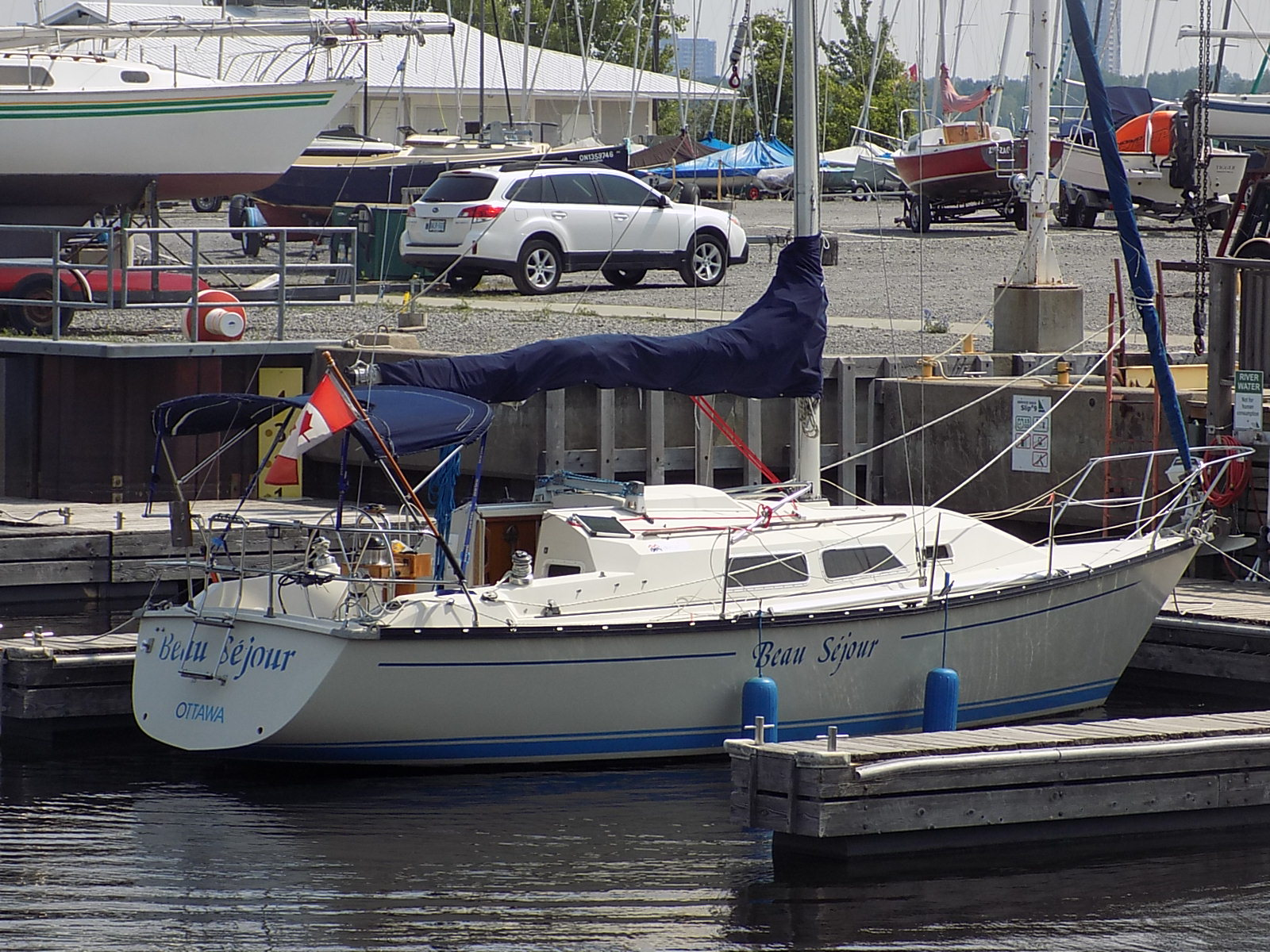

Development
- Designer: Robert Perry
- Location: Canada
- Year: 1983
- Builder: Mirage Yachts
- Name: Mirage 30

Boat
- Displacement: 8,000 lb (3,629 kg)
- Draft: 4.83 ft (1.47 m)

Hull
- Type: Monohull
- Construction: Fiberglass
- LOA: 30.00 ft (9.14 m)
- LWL: 23.75 ft (7.24 m)
- Beam: 10.50 ft (3.20 m)

Hull appendages
- Keel: fin keel
- Ballast: 2,800 lb (1,270 kg)
- Rudder: internally-mounted spade-type rudder

Rig
- General: Masthead sloop
- I foretriangle height: 40.00 ft (12.19 m)
- J foretriangle base: 12.25 ft (3.73 m)
- P mainsail luff: 34.25 ft (10.44 m)
- E mainsail foot: 11.00 ft (3.35 m)

Sails
- Mainsail area: 188.38 sq ft (17.501 m^{2})
- Jib/genoa area: 245.00 sq ft (22.761 m^{2})
- Total sail area: 433.38 sq ft (40.262 m^{2})

Racing
- PHRF: 168 (average)

The Mirage 30 is a recreational keelboat first built in 1983 and now out of production. It was built by Mirage Yachts in Canada. It is not related to the Mirage 30 SX, which is instead a development of the Kirby 30.

Designed by Robert Perry, the fiberglass hull has an internally-mounted spade-type rudder.

It has a hull speed of 6.53 kn (12.09 km/h).

It has a masthead sloop rig.
