= Hunter 27 =

Series of American sailboats

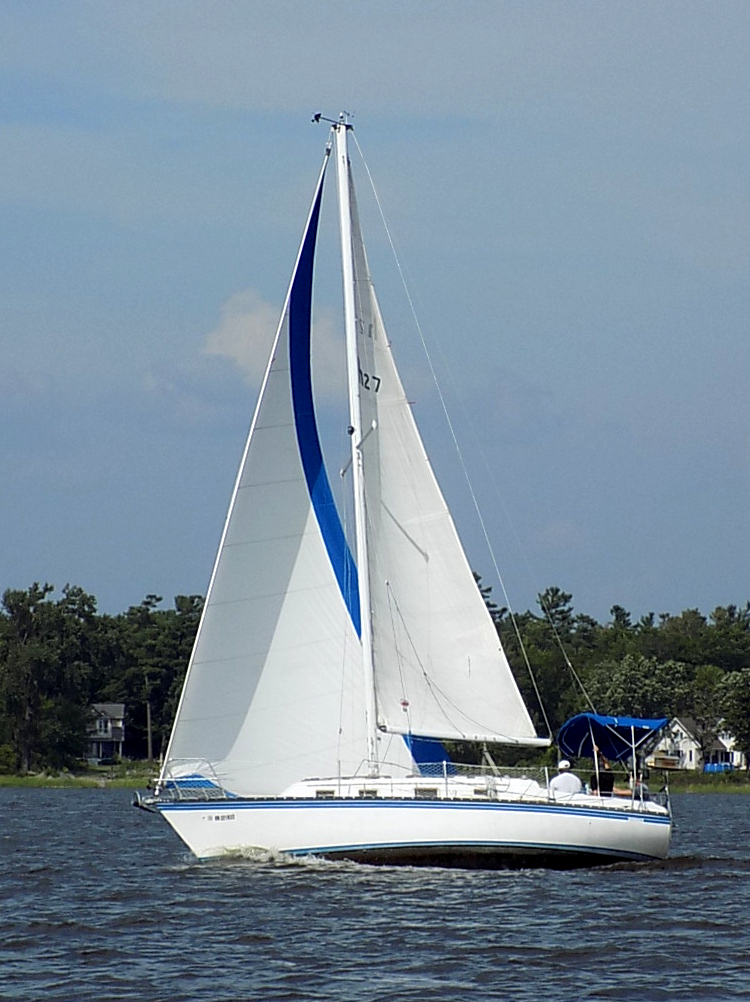
- Hunter 27

Development
- Designer: John Cherubini
- Location: United States
- Year: 1974
- No. built: 2000
- Builder: Hunter Marine
- Name: Hunter 27

Boat
- Displacement: 7,000 lb (3,175 kg)
- Draft: 4.25 ft (1.30 m)

Hull
- Type: Monohull
- Construction: Fiberglass
- LOA: 27.17 ft (8.28 m)
- LWL: 22.00 ft (6.71 m)
- Beam: 9.25 ft (2.82 m)
- Engine: Renault 8 hp (6 kW) diesel engine

Hull appendages
- Keel: fin keel
- Ballast: 3,000 lb (1,361 kg)
- Rudder: skeg-mounted rudder

Rig
- Rig type: Bermuda rig
- I foretriangle height: 34.50 ft (10.52 m)
- J foretriangle base: 11.50 ft (3.51 m)
- P mainsail luff: 29.00 ft (8.84 m)
- E mainsail foot: 10.00 ft (3.05 m)

Sails
- Sailplan: Masthead sloop
- Mainsail area: 145.00 sq ft (13.471 m^{2})
- Jib/genoa area: 198.38 sq ft (18.430 m^{2})
- Total sail area: 343.38 sq ft (31.901 m^{2})

Racing
- PHRF: 189 (average)

The Hunter 27 is a series of American sailboats, that were first built in 1974.

== Production ==
The boat was built by Hunter Marine in the United States, but it is now out of production.

== Design ==
The Hunter 27 series are all small recreational keelboats, built predominantly of fiberglass.

== Variants ==
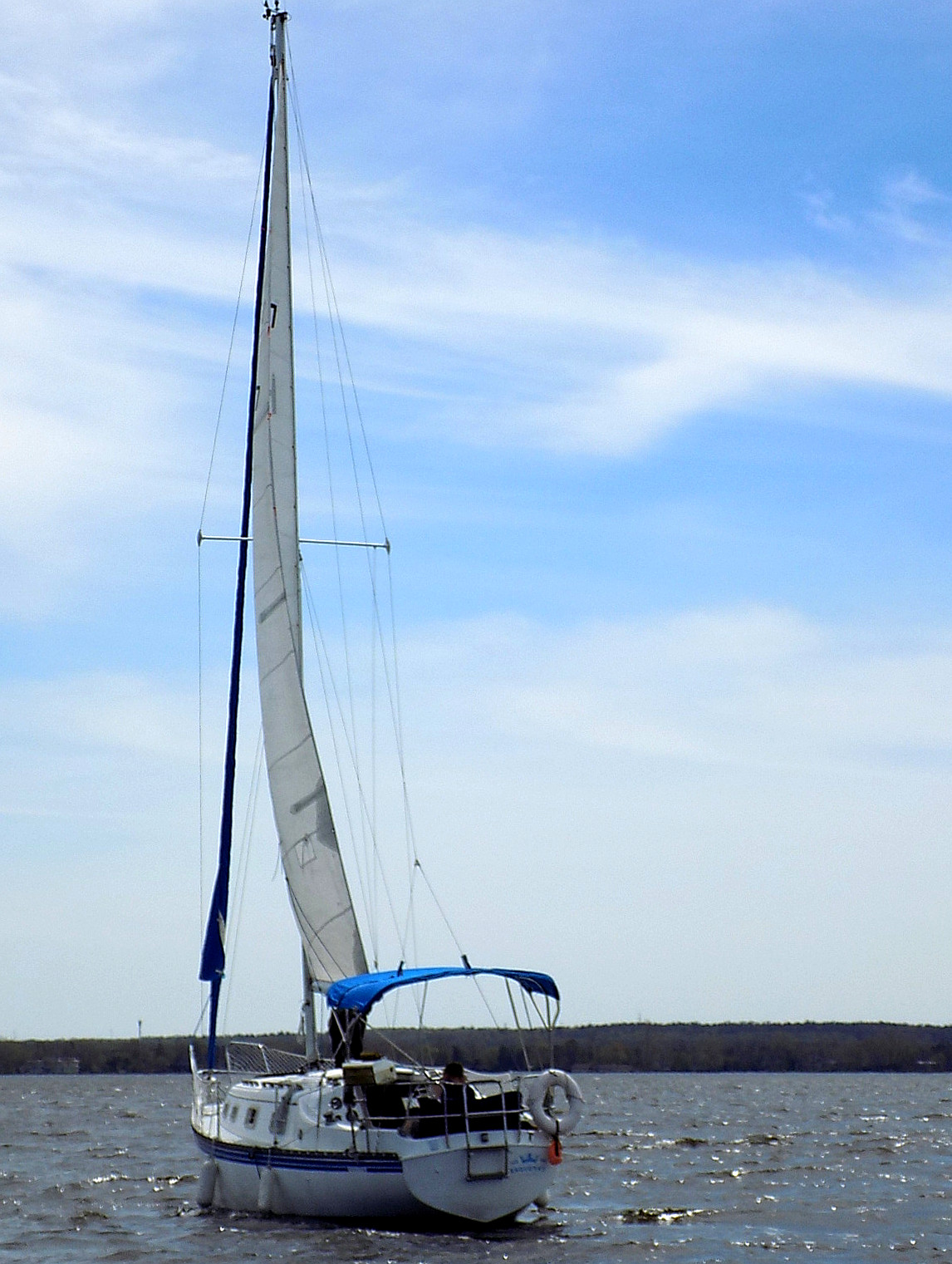
Hunter 27

Hunter 27
This model was designed by John Cherubini, introduced in 1974 and produced until 1984, with 2,000 examples completed. It has a masthead sloop rig, a length overall of 27.17 ft (8.3 m), a waterline length of 22.00 ft (6.7 m), displaces 7,000 lb (3,175 kg) and carries 3,000 lb (1,361 kg) of ballast. The boat has a draft of 4.25 ft (1.30 m) with the standard keel and 3.25 ft (0.99 m) with an optional shoal draft keel or a wing keel. The boat is fitted with a French Renault diesel engine of 8 hp (6 kW), although a Japanese Yanmar diesel was later an option. The fuel tank holds 12 U.S. gallons (45 L; 10.0 imp gal) and the fresh water tank has a capacity of 35 U.S. gallons (130 L; 29 imp gal). The full keel model has a PHRF racing average handicap of 189 with a high of 189 and low of 192. The shoal draft model has a PHRF racing average handicap of 225 with a high of 237 and low of 220. It has a hull speed of 6.29 kn (11.65 km/h). A tall mast version was also built, with a mast about 3.0 ft (0.9 m) higher. The tall mast model has a PHRF racing average handicap of 213 with a high of 222 and low of 208. With the tall mast and the shoal draft keel, the boat has a PHRF racing average handicap of 222 with a high of 219 and low of 226.
Hunter 27-2

This model was designed by the Hunter Design Team and introduced in 1989 and produced until 1994. It has a fractional rig, a length overall of 26.58 ft (8.1 m), a waterline length of 22.42 ft (6.8 m), displaces 5,000 lb (2,268 kg) and carries 2,000 lb (907 kg) of ballast. The boat has a draft of 3.50 ft (1.07 m) with the standard keel fitted. The boat is fitted with a Japanese Yanmar 1GM-10 diesel engine or an outboard motor. The boat has a PHRF racing average handicap of 192 with a high of 186 and low of 201. It has a hull speed of 6.34 kn (11.74 km/h).
Hunter 27-3

This new model was designed by Glenn Henderson and introduced in 2006. It has a B&R rig, a length overall of 27.33 ft (8.3 m), a waterline length of 23.56 ft (7.2 m), displaces 7,663 lb (3,476 kg) and carries 3,400 lb (1,542 kg) of lead ballast. The boat has a draft of 5.00 ft (1.52 m) with the deep keel and 3.44 ft (1.05 m) with the optional shoal draft bulb keel. A twin bilge keel model was also sold in the UK. The boat is fitted with a Japanese Yanmar diesel engine of 10 hp (7 kW). The fuel tank holds 15 U.S. gallons (57 L; 12 imp gal) and the fresh water tank has a capacity of 20 U.S. gallons (76 L; 17 imp gal). The boat has a hull speed of 6.5 kn (12.04 km/h).
Hunter 27X

This model is a high-performance racing version of the Hunter 27-3, that was also designed by Glenn Henderson and introduced in 2006. It has a fractional sloop rig, a length overall of 27.33 ft (8.3 m), a waterline length of 23.56 ft (7.2 m), displaces 8,000 lb (3,629 kg) and carries 2,500 lb (1,134 kg) of ballast. The boat has a draft of 5.52 ft (1.68 m) with the standard keel fitted. The boat is fitted with a Japanese Yanmar diesel engine of 14 hp (10 kW). The fuel tank holds 15 U.S. gallons (57 L; 12 imp gal) and the fresh water tank has a capacity of 20 U.S. gallons (76 L; 17 imp gal). The boat has a hull speed of 6.5 kn (12.04 km/h).
Hunter 27 Edge

This model was a completely new design by the Hunter Design Team and introduced in 2006, as a trailerable sail and power hybrid boat, with a centerboard and 1,598 lb (725 kg) of flooding water ballast for sailing. It has a fractional sloop rig, a length overall of 26.35 ft (8.0 m), a waterline length of 24.18 ft (7.4 m), displaces 3,450 lb (1,565 kg) (5,048 lb (2,290 kg) with water ballast). The boat has a draft of 4.92 ft (1.50 m) with the centerboard extended and 1.57 ft (0.48 m) with it retracted, allowing beaching or ground transportation on a trailer. The boat can be fitted with outboard motors of up to 75 hp (56 kW) and can achieve a speed of 20 kn (37.04 km/h) under power with no water ballast. The fuel tank holds 6 U.S. gallons (23 L; 5.0 imp gal) and the fresh water tank has a capacity of 10 U.S. gallons (38 L; 8.3 imp gal). The boat has a hull speed of 6.59 kn (12.20 km/h) in displacement mode.

== See also ==
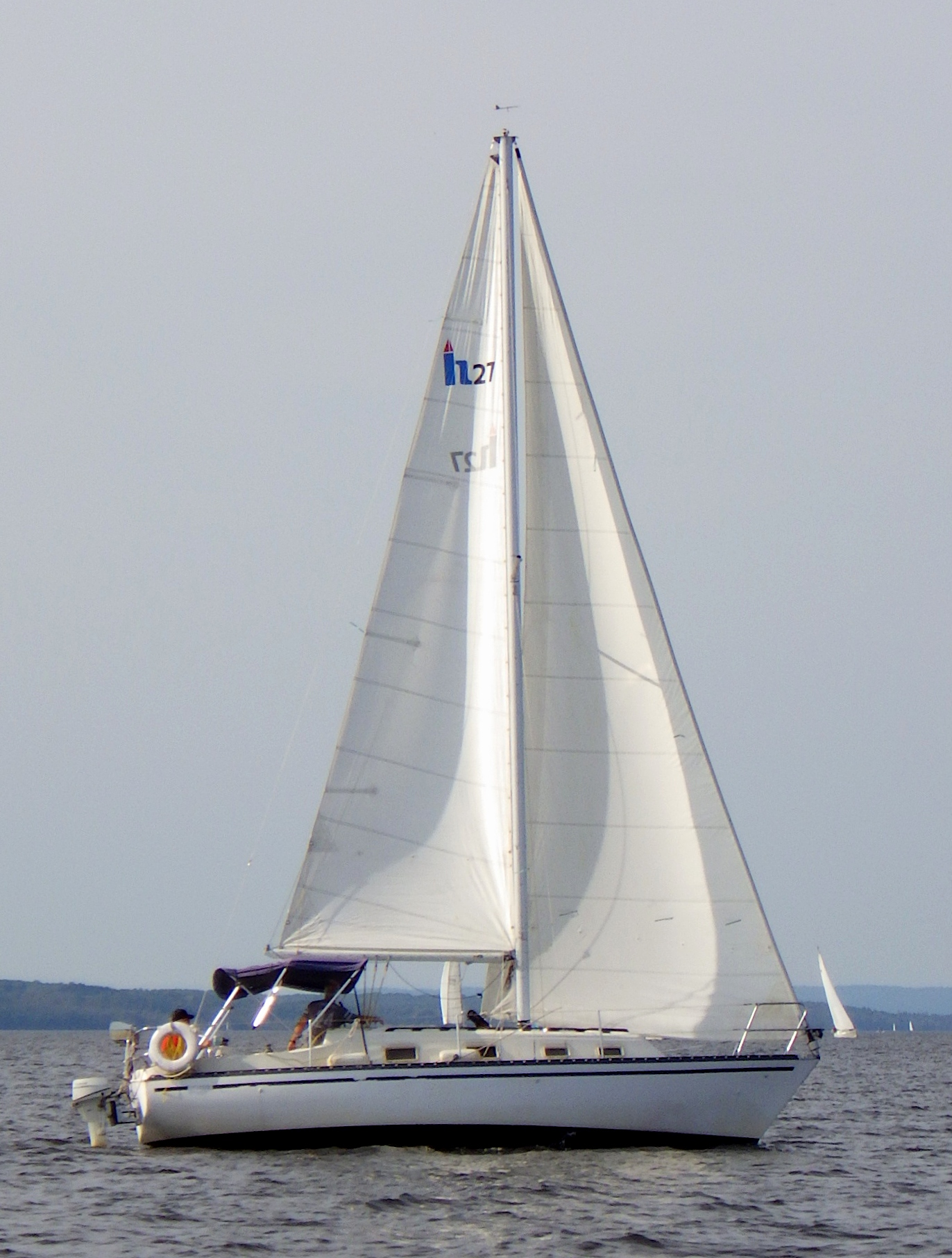
Hunter 27

- List of sailing boat types

Similar sailboats

- Aloha 27
- C&C 27
- Cal 27
- Cal 2-27
- Cal 3-27
- Catalina 27
- Catalina 270
- Catalina 275 Sport
- Crown 28
- CS 27
- Edel 820
- Express 27
- Fantasia 27
- Halman Horizon
- Hotfoot 27
- Hullmaster 27
- Irwin 27
- Island Packet 27
- Mirage 27 (Perry)
- Mirage 27 (Schmidt)
- Mirage 275
- O'Day 272
- Orion 27-2
- Tanzer 27
- Watkins 27
- Watkins 27P
