= Mirage Yachts =

Sailboat manufacturer

Mirage Yachts Limited
- Company type: Privately held company
- Industry: Boat building
- Founded: February 1972
- Founder: Dick and Irene Steffen
- Defunct: 1989
- Fate: Out of business
- Headquarters: Pointe Claire, Quebec and later Vaudreuil, Quebec, Canada
- Products: Sailboats
- Number of employees: 15 (circa 1975)

Mirage Yachts Limited was a Canadian boat builder initially based in Pointe Claire, Quebec, a suburb of Montreal and founded by Dick and Irene Steffen. The company specialized in the manufacture of sailboats.

The company was founded in February 1972 and went out of business in 1989.

== History ==
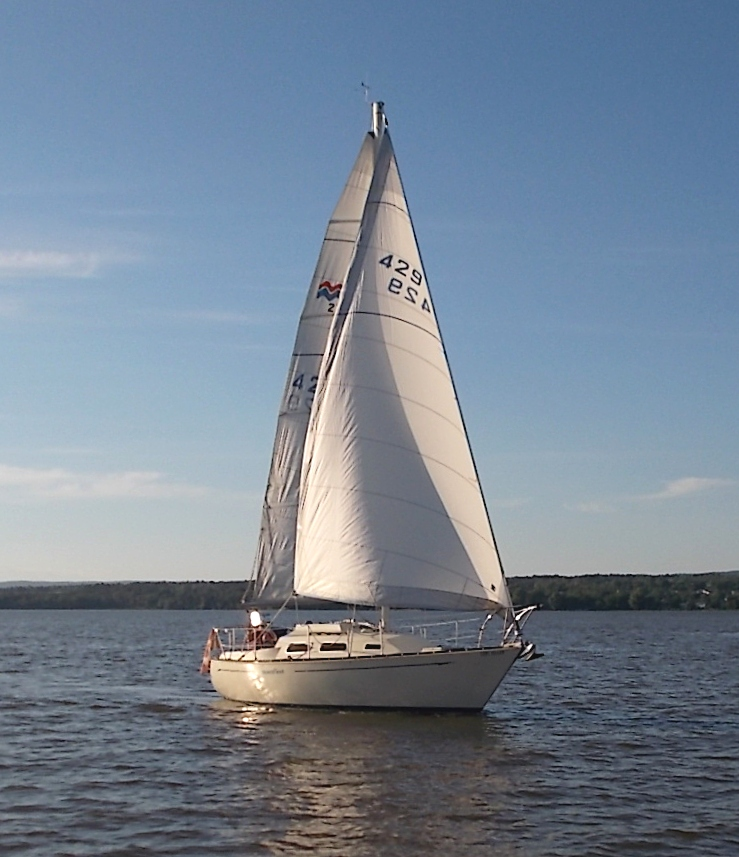
Mirage 27 (Perry)

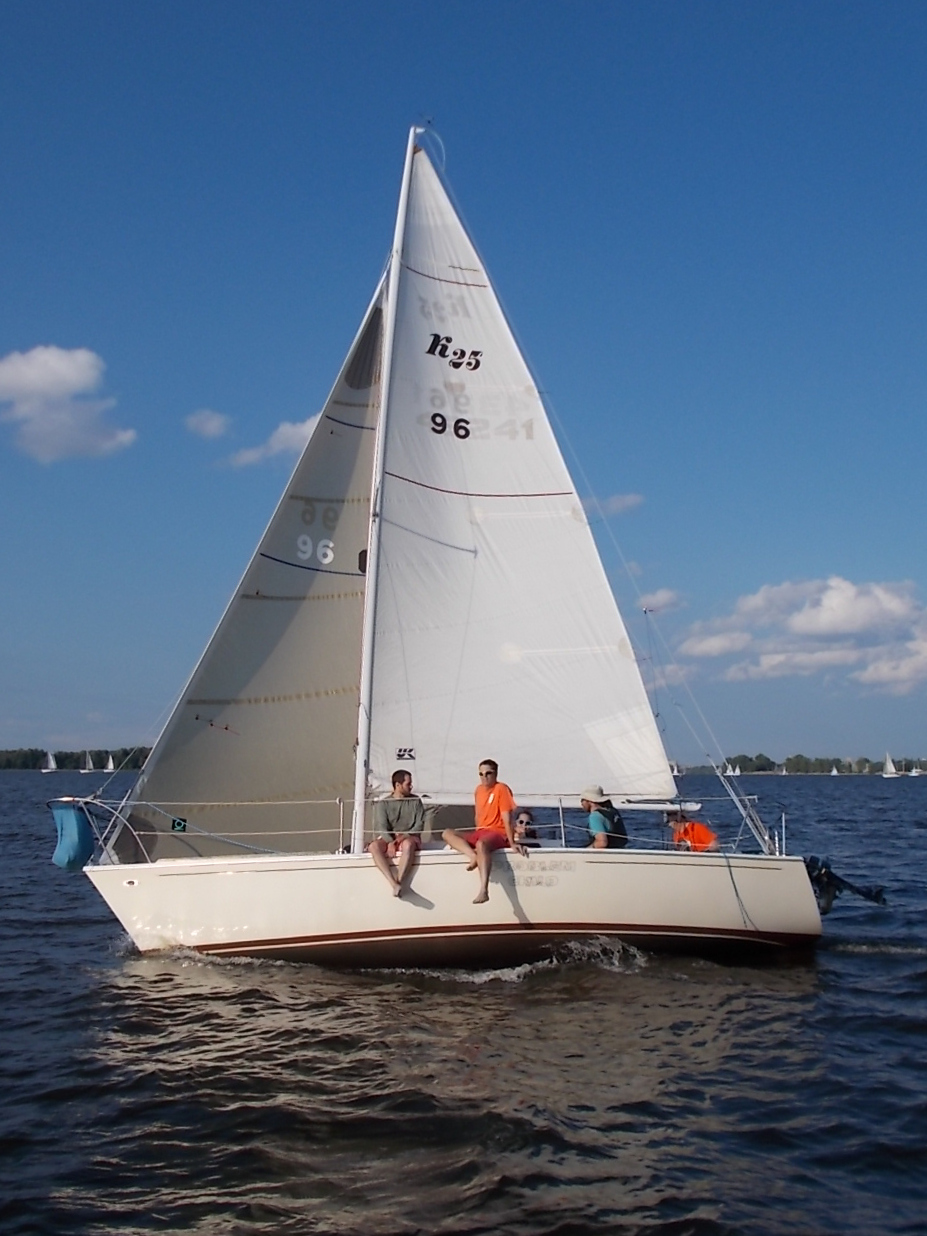
Kirby 25

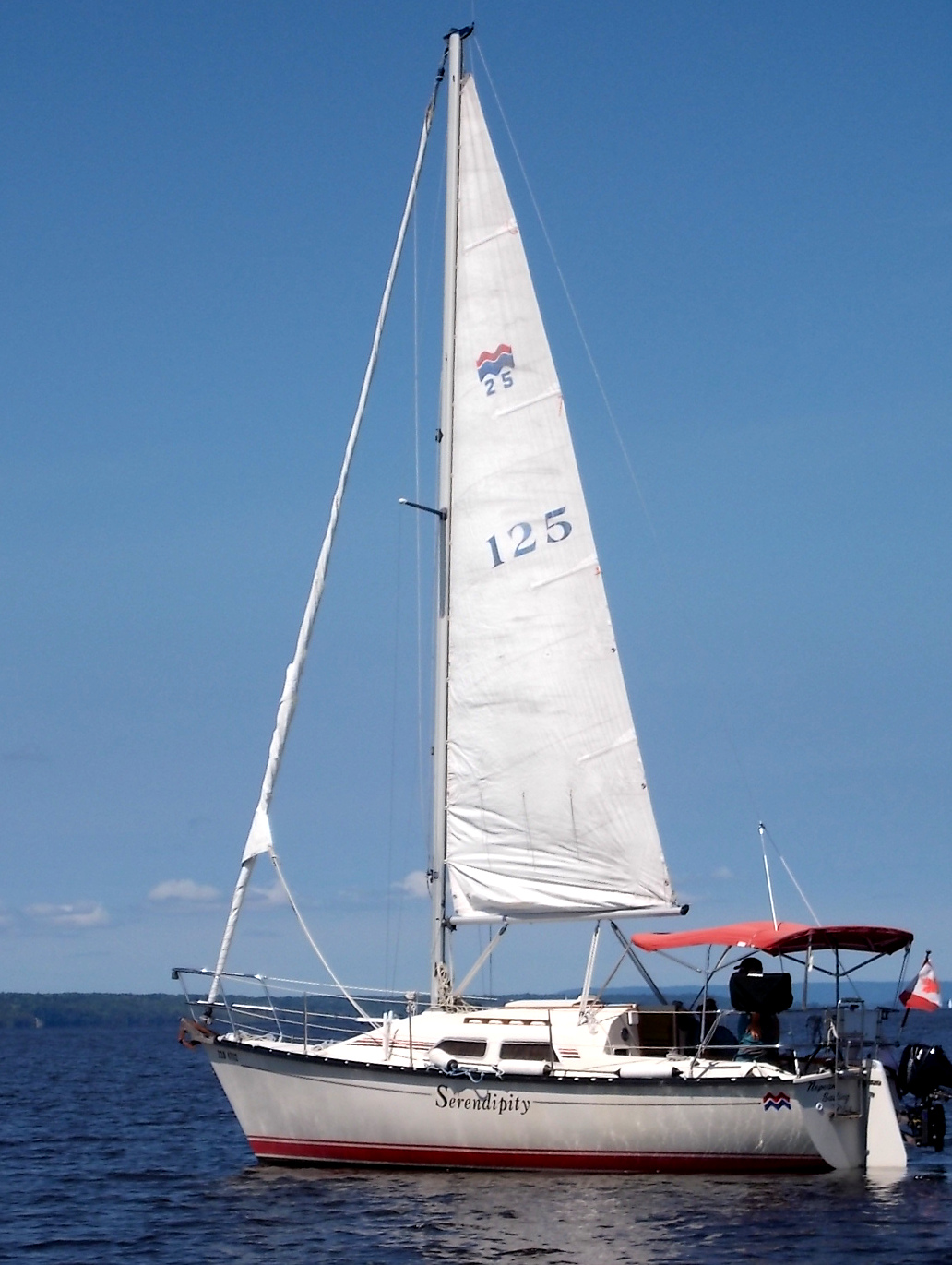
Mirage 25

The Steffens had owned a yacht dealership for C&C Yachts, that was located in Pointe Claire. The company had done good business selling C&C boats, but the C&C line did not offer a boat smaller than the C&C 27. Dick Steffen was a competitive sailing racer and thought that there would be a good market for a C&C 24 foot keelboat. At his request C&C designed the boat, but decided not to proceed with production. Steffen bought the design from C&C, founding Mirage Yachts in February 1972 to build the design.

Initially the new company was located on the second floor of a rented building in Pointe Claire, a major Canadian sailing centre that included the Laser factory Performance Sailcraft at that time and home of Laser builder Ian Bruce and the Pointe-Claire Yacht Club.

The Mirage 24 sold well and the company soon had 15 employees constructing the model. One factor in its brisk sales was its racing record in Midget Ocean Racing Club (MORC) class events. Even 15 years after its introduction a Mirage 24 won the production boat division in the MORC national championships.

Caught off guard, C&C decided to produce a competitor, the C&C 25, which was very similar to the Mirage 24's design. The Mirage 24 continued to sell well and usually beat the C&C 25 in competition.

Steffen approached C&C to design an enlarged version of the Mirage 24, but C&C turned down the effort, calculating that it could hurt sales of their models in that size range. As a result, Steffen asked Peter Schmidt to design the Mirage 27 (Schmidt) in 1975 and American Robert Perry to design the Mirage 26 the following year.

Needing larger facilities the company was moved to a location in Vaudreuil, Quebec that offered 12,000 sq ft (1,100 m^{2}) of floor space. This was expanded to 30,000 sq ft (2,800 m^{2}) and in 1983 to 35,000 sq ft (3,300 m^{2}), with the spars being built in a 5,000 sq ft (460 m^{2}) facility in Dorion, Quebec.

The Perry-designed boats, such as the Mirage 33 and the Mirage 30, sold very well and established the company as a builder of winning racing boats as well as family cruisers.

In the late 1970s the J/24 was the dominant racing keelboat and Steffen asked Bruce Kirby, famed for his Laser dinghy, to design a competitor, the Kirby 25, which proved more than a competitive match for the J/24. The later J/30 was opposed by the Kirby 30 and its developed version, the Mirage 30 SX.

As a result of a favourable exchange rate and European design, French sailboats took a large portion of the North American market in the mid-1980s and sales of the Perry-designed Mirage 30 did not meet expectations.

In seeking a newer design to replace the Mirage 27 in the product line in 1985 Steffen asked a number of designers to provide preliminary designs for a boat in this class. The winner was Phillippe Harlé, who completed his design for the Mirage 29, which was introduced into the market in the spring of 1986, becoming a quick success. Fifty boats were sold before the first had been delivered and just under 300 were built in total. Harlé went onto design the Mirage 275.

The Mirage 39, designed by H. Morton, was the final boat introduced by Mirage in 1989.

With sales doing well the Steffens saw a good opportunity to sell the company in 1989 and it was acquired by a local Montreal investor. The investor quickly went out of business and the company closed that same year.

== Sailboats ==
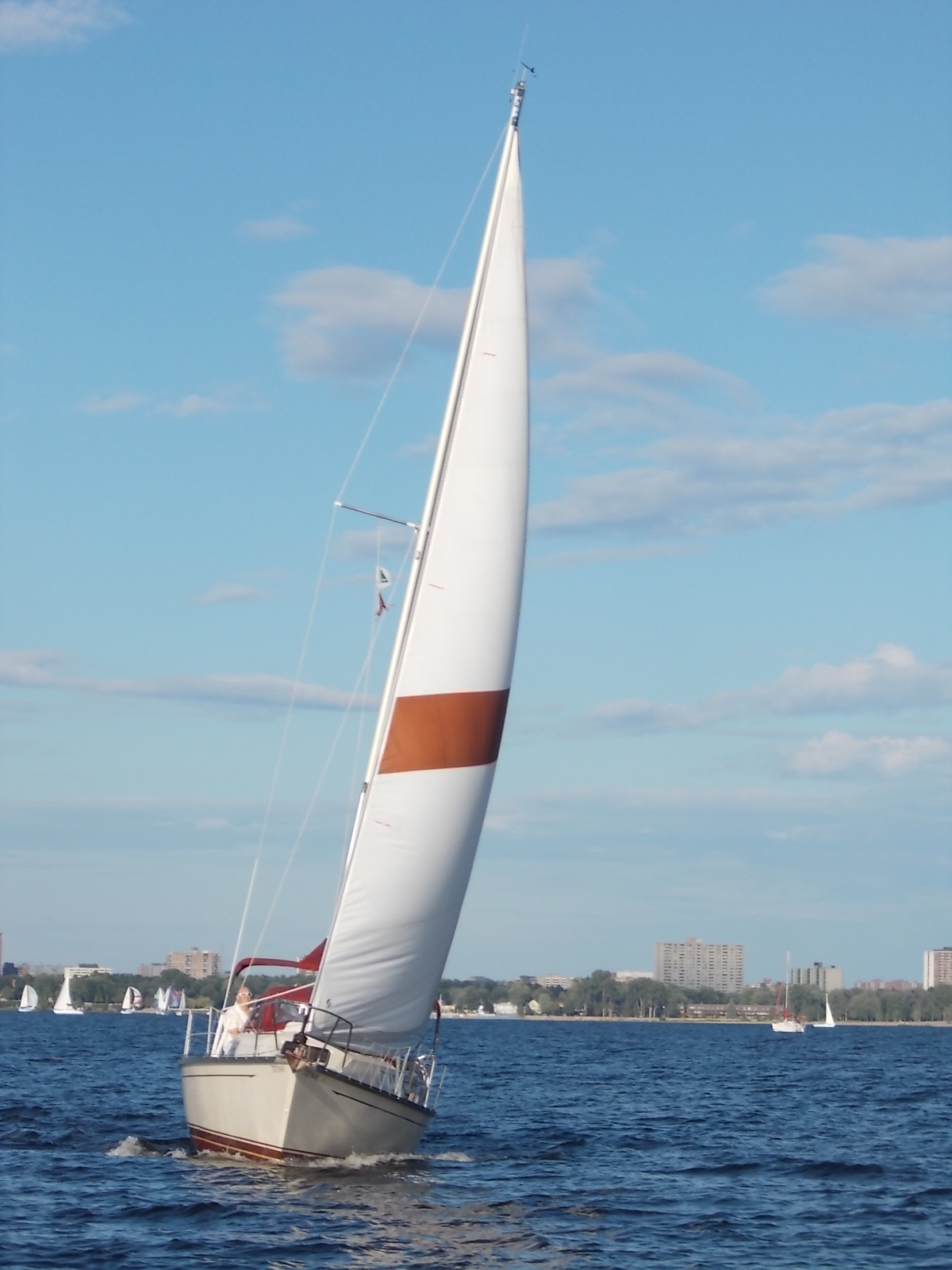
Mirage 30

Summary of boats built by Mirage, by date:

- Mirage 24 1972
- Mirage 27 (Schmidt) 1975
- Mirage 26 1976
- Kirby 25 1978
- Mirage 25 1979
- Kirby 30 1981
- Mirage 27 (Perry) 1982
- Mirage 33 1982
- Mirage 25 1982
- Mirage 35 1983
- Mirage 30 1983
- Mirage 30 SX 1985
- Mirage 29 1986
- Mirage 275 1986
- Mirage 32 1987
- Mirage 39 1989

== See also ==
- List of sailboat designers and manufacturers
