= Santana 39 =

Sailboat class

Development
- Designer: Gary Mull and W. Shad Turner
- Location: United States
- Year: 1972
- No. built: 20
- Builder: W. D. Schock Corp
- Name: Santana 39

Boat
- Displacement: 18,000 lb (8,165 kg)
- Draft: 5.58 ft (1.70 m)

Hull
- Type: Monohull
- Construction: Fiberglass
- LOA: 39.00 ft (11.89 m)
- LWL: 32.00 ft (9.75 m)
- Beam: 11.67 ft (3.56 m)
- Engine: Perkins Engines diesel engine 50 hp (37 kW)

Hull appendages
- Keel: fin keel
- Ballast: 6,600 lb (2,994 kg)
- Rudder: Skeg-mounted rudder

Rig
- General: Masthead sloop
- I foretriangle height: 50.00 ft (15.24 m)
- J foretriangle base: 16.00 ft (4.88 m)
- P mainsail luff: 44.00 ft (13.41 m)
- E mainsail foot: 13.00 ft (3.96 m)

Sails
- Mainsail area: 286.00 sq ft (26.570 m^{2})
- Jib/genoa area: 400.00 sq ft (37.161 m^{2})
- Total sail area: 686.00 sq ft (63.731 m^{2})

The Santana 39 is an American sailboat, that was designed by Gary Mull and W. Shad Turner and first built in 1972.

== Production ==
The boat was built by W. D. Schock Corp in the United States between 1972 and 1979, with 20 examples completed. The design is out of production.

== Design ==
The Santana 39 is a small recreational keelboat, built predominantly of fiberglass. It has a masthead sloop rig, a skeg-mounted rudder and a fixed fin keel. It displaces 18,000 lb (8,165 kg) and carries 6,600 lb (2,994 kg) of lead ballast. The boat has a draft of 5.58 ft (1.70 m) with the standard keel.

The boat is fitted with a British Perkins diesel engine of 50 hp (37 kW).

The boat has a hull speed of 7.46 kn (13.82 km/h).

== See also ==
- List of sailing boat types

Similar sailboats

- C&C 39
- C&C 40
- CS 40
- Mirage 39
