= C&C 39 =

Canadian sailboat class

Development
- Designer: Cuthbertson & Cassian
- Location: Canada
- Year: 1971
- No. built: 48
- Builder: C&C Yachts
- Name: C&C 39

Boat
- Displacement: 16,750 lb (7,598 kg)
- Draft: 6.25 ft (1.91 m)

Hull
- Type: Monohull
- Construction: Fiberglass
- LOA: 39.25 ft (11.96 m)
- LWL: 30.50 ft (9.30 m)
- Beam: 11.50 ft (3.51 m)
- Engine: Universal Atomic 4 gasoline engine

Hull appendages
- Keel: swept fin keel
- Rudder: internally-mounted spade-type rudder

Rig
- Rig type: Bermuda rig
- I foretriangle height: 51.00 ft (15.54 m)
- J foretriangle base: 17.00 ft (5.18 m)
- P mainsail luff: 45.00 ft (13.72 m)
- E mainsail foot: 13.00 ft (3.96 m)

Sails
- Sailplan: Masthead sloop
- Mainsail area: 292.50 sq ft (27.174 m^{2})
- Jib/genoa area: 433.50 sq ft (40.273 m^{2})
- Total sail area: 726.00 sq ft (67.448 m^{2})

The C&C 39 is a Canadian sailboat, that was designed by Cuthbertson & Cassian and first built in 1971.

== Production ==
The boat was built by C&C Yachts in Canada, between 1971 and 1974. During its three-year production run, a total of 48 examples were completed.

== Design ==
The C&C 39 is a small recreational keelboat, built predominantly of fiberglass, with wood trim. It has a masthead sloop rig, an internally-mounted spade-type rudder and a swept fixed fin keel. It displaces 16,750 lb (7,598 kg) and has a draft of 6.25 ft (1.91 m) with the standard keel fitted.

The boat is fitted with a Universal Atomic 4 gasoline engine. The fuel tank holds 28 U.S. gallons (110 L; 23 imp gal) and the fresh water tank has a capacity of 70 U.S. gallons (260 L; 58 imp gal).

A taller mast version was also produced that had a mast about 1 ft (0.3 m) higher than the standard mast.

The tall mast version has a PHRF racing average handicap of 105 with a high of 115 and low of 99. Both models have hull speeds of 7.54 kn (13.96 km/h).

== See also ==
- List of sailing boat types

Similar sailboats

- CS 40
- Mirage 39
- Santana 39
