= Mirage 275 =

Sailboat class

Development
- Designer: Philippe Harlé
- Location: Canada
- Year: 1986
- Builder: Mirage Yachts
- Name: Mirage 275

Boat
- Displacement: 6,800 lb (3,084 kg)
- Draft: 4.33 ft (1.32 m)

Hull
- Type: Monohull
- Construction: Fiberglass
- LOA: 27.50 ft (8.38 m)
- LWL: 22.50 ft (6.86 m)
- Beam: 9.83 ft (3.00 m)
- Engine: Universal diesel engine

Hull appendages
- Keel: fin keel
- Ballast: 2,400 lb (1,089 kg)
- Rudder: internally-mounted spade-type rudder

Rig
- General: Masthead sloop
- I foretriangle height: 35.50 ft (10.82 m)
- J foretriangle base: 10.50 ft (3.20 m)
- P mainsail luff: 30.00 ft (9.14 m)
- E mainsail foot: 9.83 ft (3.00 m)

Sails
- Mainsail area: 147.45 sq ft (13.699 m^{2})
- Jib/genoa area: 186.38 sq ft (17.315 m^{2})
- Total sail area: 333.83 sq ft (31.014 m^{2})

Racing
- PHRF: 192 (average, wing keel version)

The Mirage 275 is a Canadian sailboat, that was designed by Philippe Harlé and first built in 1986.

== Production ==
The boat was built by Mirage Yachts in Canada, starting in 1986, but the company went out of business in 1989 and it is now out of production.

== Design ==
The Mirage 275 is a small recreational keelboat, built predominantly of fiberglass. It has a masthead sloop rig, an internally-mounted spade-type rudder and a fixed fin keel. It displaces 6,800 lb (3,084 kg) and carries 2,400 lb (1,089 kg) of ballast.

The boat has a draft of 4.33 ft (1.32 m) with the standard keel. An optional shoal draft wing keel version was also available.

The boat is fitted with a Universal diesel engine. The fuel tank holds 10 U.S. gallons (38 L; 8.3 imp gal) and the fresh water tank has a capacity of 10 U.S. gallons (38 L; 8.3 imp gal).

The wing keel version of the boat has a PHRF racing average handicap of 192 with a high of 186 and low of 201. It has a hull speed of 6.36 kn (11.78 km/h).

== See also ==
- List of sailing boat types

Similar sailboats

- Cal 27
- Cal 2-27
- Cal 3-27
- C&C 27
- Catalina 270
- Crown 28
- CS 27
- Hotfoot 27
- Hullmaster 27
- Hunter 27
- Hunter 27-2
- Hunter 27-3
- Mirage 27 (Perry)
- Mirage 27 (Schmidt)
- Orion 27-2
