= Kirby 30 =

Sailboat class

Development
- Designer: Bruce Kirby
- Location: Canada
- Year: 1981
- No. built: 195
- Builder: Mirage Yachts
- Name: Kirby 30

Boat
- Displacement: 5,350 lb (2,427 kg)
- Draft: 5.50 ft (1.68 m)

Hull
- Type: Monohull
- Construction: Fibreglass
- LOA: 29.67 ft (9.04 m)
- LWL: 23.50 ft (7.16 m)
- Beam: 10.25 ft (3.12 m)
- Engine: BMW or Yanmar diesel engine

Hull appendages
- Keel: fin keel
- Ballast: 2,300 lb (1,043 kg)
- Rudder: internally-mounted spade-type rudder

Rig
- General: Fractional rigged sloop
- I foretriangle height: 34.50 ft (10.52 m)
- J foretriangle base: 10.60 ft (3.23 m)
- P mainsail luff: 37.25 ft (11.35 m)
- E mainsail foot: 13.50 ft (4.11 m)

Sails
- Mainsail area: 251.44 sq ft (23.360 m^{2})
- Jib/genoa area: 182.85 sq ft (16.987 m^{2})
- Total sail area: 434.29 sq ft (40.347 m^{2})

Racing
- PHRF: 135 (average)

The Kirby 30 is a Canadian racing sailboat, that was designed by Bruce Kirby and first built in 1981.

The Kirby 30 design was a follow-on to the Kirby 25 and it was later developed into the Mirage 30 SX in 1985.

== Production ==
The boat was built by Mirage Yachts in Canada, starting in 1981. The company completed 195 examples, but it is now out of production.

== Design ==
The Kirby 30 is a small recreational racing keelboat, built predominantly of fibreglass. It has a fractional sloop rig, an internally-mounted spade-type rudder and a fixed fin keel. It displaces 5,350 lb (2,427 kg) and carries 2,300 lb (1,043 kg) of ballast.

The boat has a draft of 5.50 ft (1.68 m) with the standard keel and is fitted with a BMW or Yanmar diesel engine.

The boat has a PHRF racing average handicap of 135 with a high of 142 and low of 132. It has a hull speed of 6.5 kn (12.04 km/h).

== Operational history ==
In a 1980 review in Canadian Yachting, John Turnbull described the design as, "Not your average thirty. If you need standing headroom. forget it. But if you love to sail, and sail fast".

== See also ==
- List of sailing boat types
