= Mirage 25 =

1980s Canadian recreational keelboat

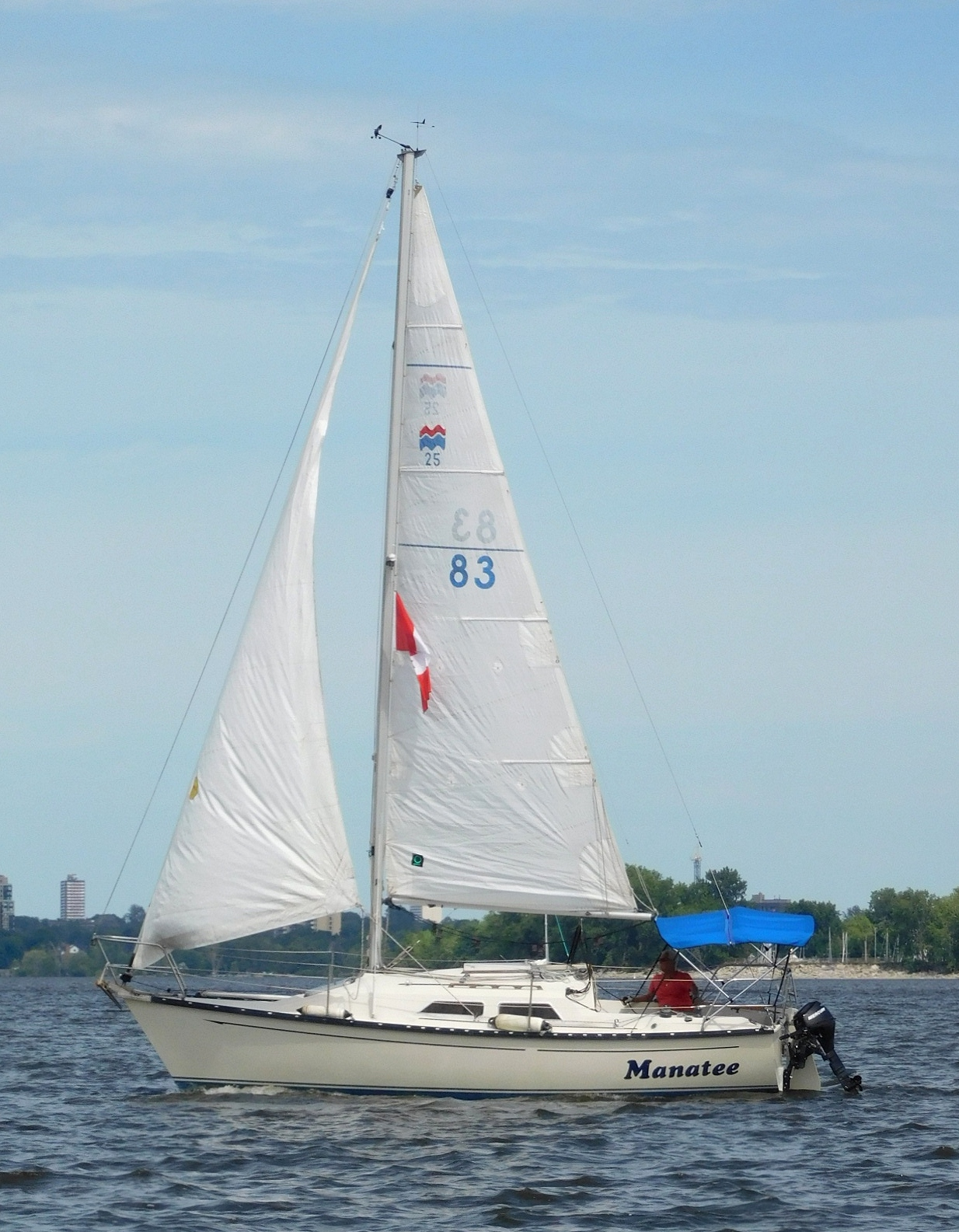

Development
- Designer: Robert Perry
- Location: Canada
- Year: 1982
- Builder: Mirage Yachts
- Name: Mirage 25

Boat
- Displacement: 4,400 lb (1,996 kg)
- Draft: 4.33 ft (1.32 m)

Hull
- Type: Monohull
- Construction: Fiberglass
- LOA: 25.17 ft (7.67 m)
- LWL: 21.00 ft (6.40 m)
- Beam: 9.50 ft (2.90 m)
- Engine: outboard motor

Hull appendages
- Keel: fixed fin keel
- Ballast: 1,600 lb (726 kg)
- Rudder: transom-mounted rudder

Rig
- General: Masthead sloop

The Mirage 25 is a recreational keelboat designed by Robert Perry. From 1982 to 1984 130 were built by Mirage Yachts in Pointe Claire, Quebec.

The fiberglass hull has a transom-hung rudder. It has a theoretical hull speed of 6.14 kn (11.37 km/h). It has a deck-stepped masthead rig.

A high cabin top and wide beam allow for a roomy cabin with headroom of five feet 11 inches.. It has a fully enclosed head and four berths.

== Gallery ==
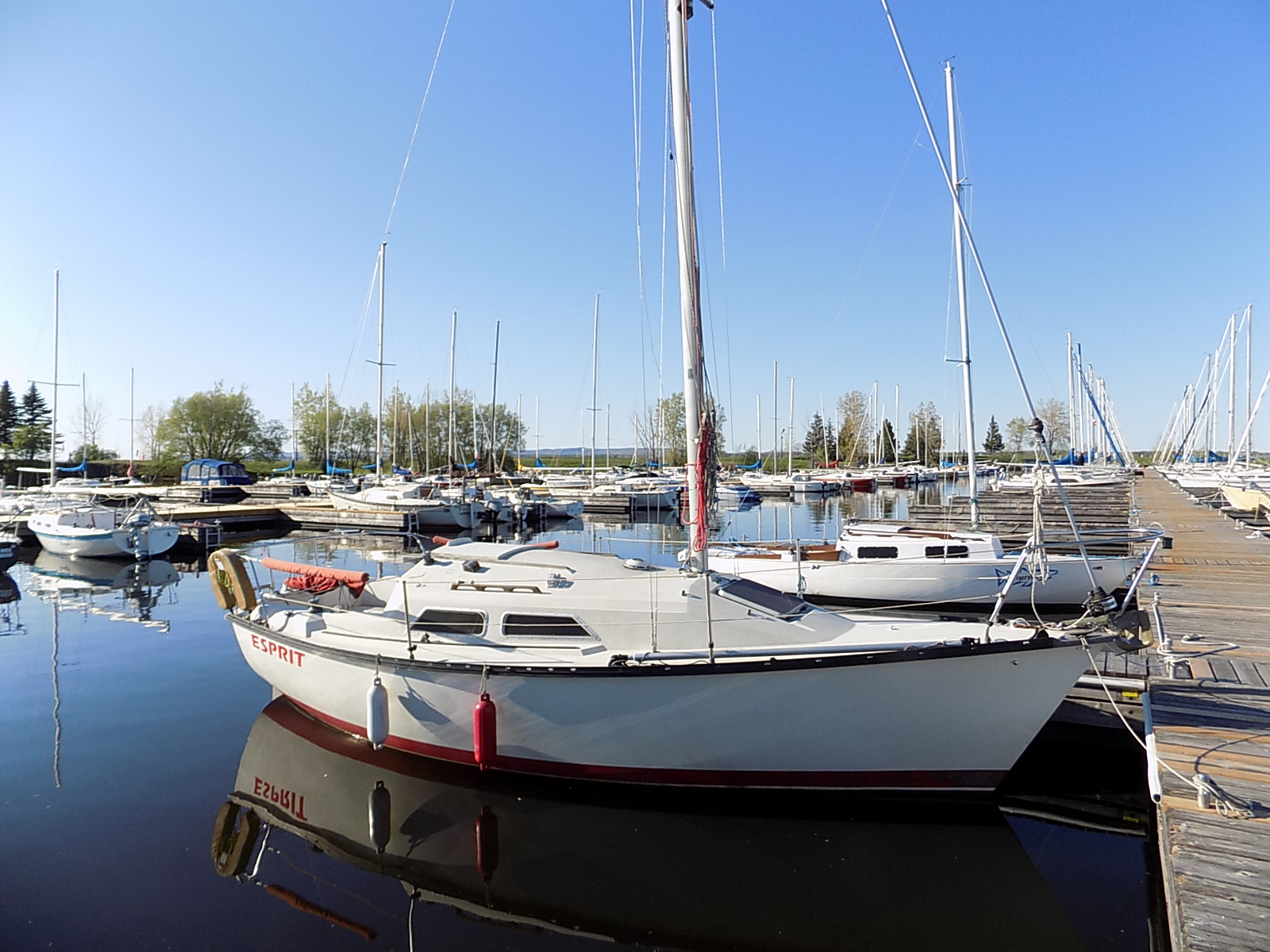
Mirage 25

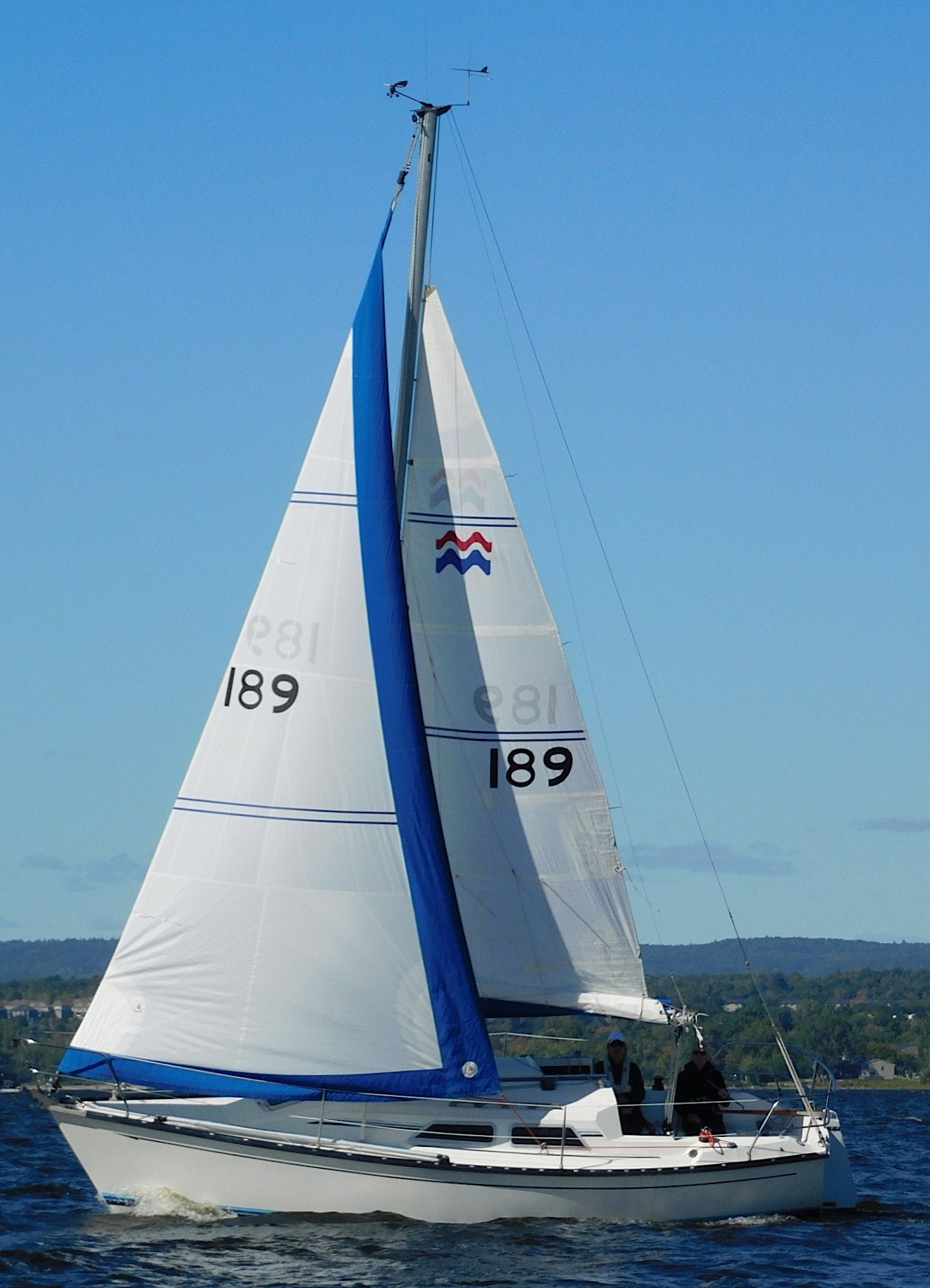
Mirage 25 with reefed mainsail
