= Mirage 30 SX =

Sailboat class

Development
- Designer: Bruce Kirby
- Location: Canada
- Year: 1985
- Builder: Mirage Yachts
- Name: Mirage 30 SX

Boat
- Displacement: 5,900 lb (2,676 kg)
- Draft: 5.89 ft (1.80 m)

Hull
- Type: Monohull
- Construction: Fiberglass
- LOA: 30.00 ft (9.14 m)
- LWL: 24.12 ft (7.35 m)
- Beam: 10.50 ft (3.20 m)
- Engine: Bukh DB 8 diesel engine

Hull appendages
- Keel: fin keel
- Rudder: internally-mounted spade-type rudder

Rig
- General: Fractional rigged sloop
- I foretriangle height: 38.27 ft (11.66 m)
- J foretriangle base: 11.72 ft (3.57 m)
- P mainsail luff: 38.72 ft (11.80 m)
- E mainsail foot: 12.88 ft (3.93 m)

Sails
- Mainsail area: 249.36 sq ft (23.166 m^{2})
- Jib/genoa area: 224.26 sq ft (20.834 m^{2})
- Total sail area: 473.6 sq ft (44.00 m^{2})

Racing
- PHRF: 114 (average)

The Mirage 30 SX is a Canadian sailboat, that was designed by Bruce Kirby as a racer and first built in 1985.

The Mirage 30 SX design is not related to the Mirage 30, but is instead a lightweight development of the Kirby 30, with a deeper elliptical shaped keel, a new rudder and a racing interior.

== Production ==
The boat was built by Mirage Yachts in Canada, but it is now out of production. Only a small number were built.

== Design ==
The Mirage 30 SX is a small racing keelboat, built predominantly of fiberglass. It has a fractional sloop rig, an internally-mounted spade-type rudder and a fixed fin keel. It displaces 5,900 lb (2,676 kg).

The boat has a draft of 5.89 ft (1.80 m) with the standard keel. It is fitted with a Bukh DB 8 diesel engine.

The boat has a PHRF racing average handicap of 114 with a high of 108 and low of 120. It has a hull speed of 6.58 kn (12.19 km/h).

== See also ==
- List of sailing boat types
