= Mirage 26 =

1970s Canadian recreational keelboat

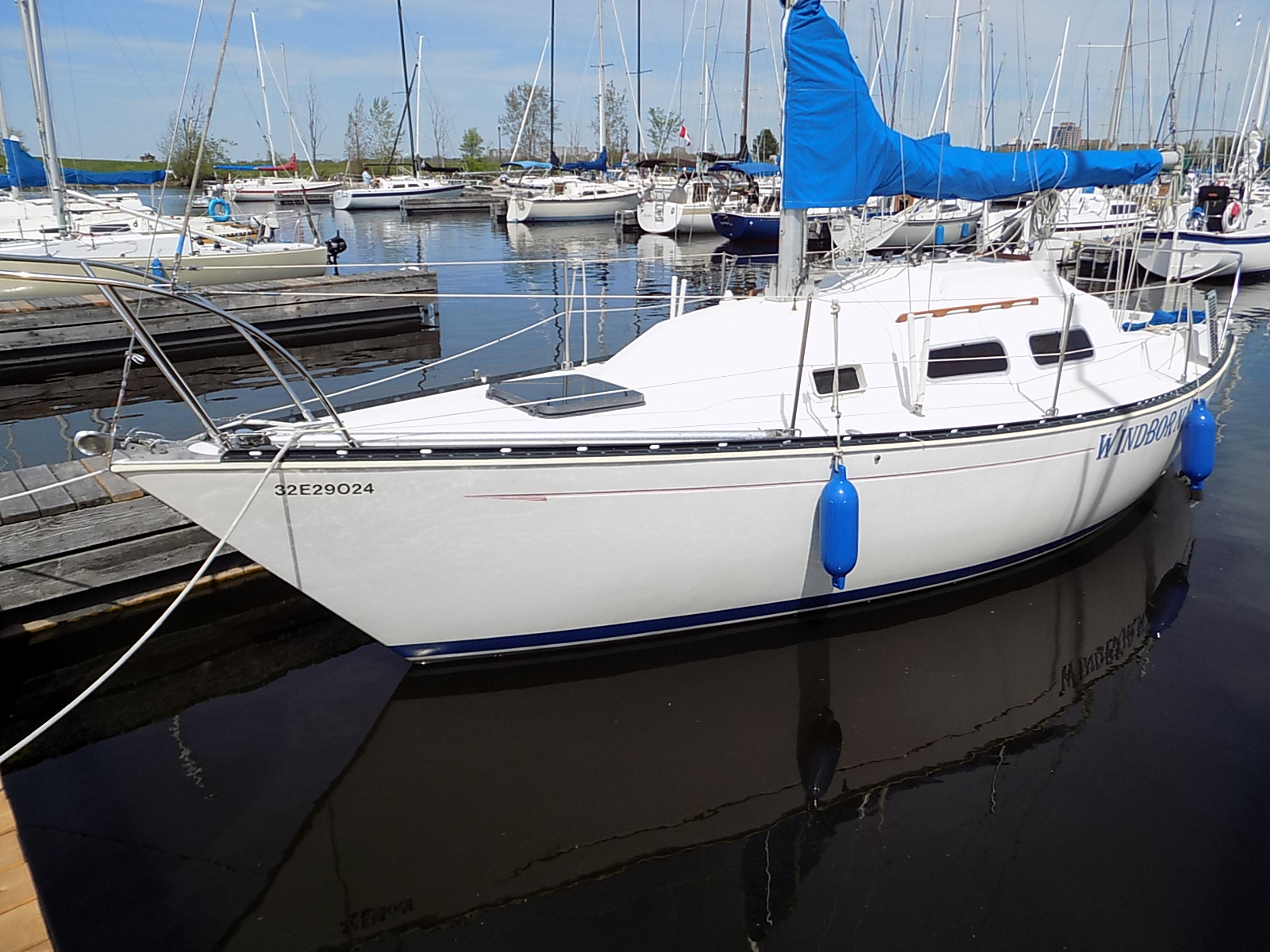

Development
- Designer: Robert Perry
- Location: Canada
- Year: 1976
- Builder: Mirage Yachts
- Name: Mirage 26

Boat
- Displacement: 4,770 lb (2,164 kg)
- Draft: 4.50 ft (1.37 m)

Hull
- Type: Monohull
- Construction: Fiberglass
- LOA: 26.17 ft (7.98 m)
- LWL: 21.67 ft (6.61 m)
- Beam: 9.25 ft (2.82 m)
- Engine: Outboard motor

Hull appendages
- Keel: fin keel
- Ballast: 2,050 lb (930 kg)
- Rudder: Transom-mounted rudder

Rig
- General: Masthead sloop
- I foretriangle height: 33.60 ft (10.24 m)
- J foretriangle base: 11.00 ft (3.35 m)
- P mainsail luff: 28.50 ft (8.69 m)
- E mainsail foot: 9.00 ft (2.74 m)

Sails
- Mainsail area: 128.25 sq ft (11.915 m^{2})
- Jib/genoa area: 184.80 sq ft (17.168 m^{2})
- Total sail area: 313.05 sq ft (29.083 m^{2})

Racing
- PHRF: 210 (average)

The Mirage 26 is a recreational keelboat built by Mirage Yachts in Canada from 1976 to 1981. It has a masthead sloop rig. Most were powered by a two-stroke gasoline OMC saildrive.
