= Kirby 25 =

1978 Canadian racing keelboat design

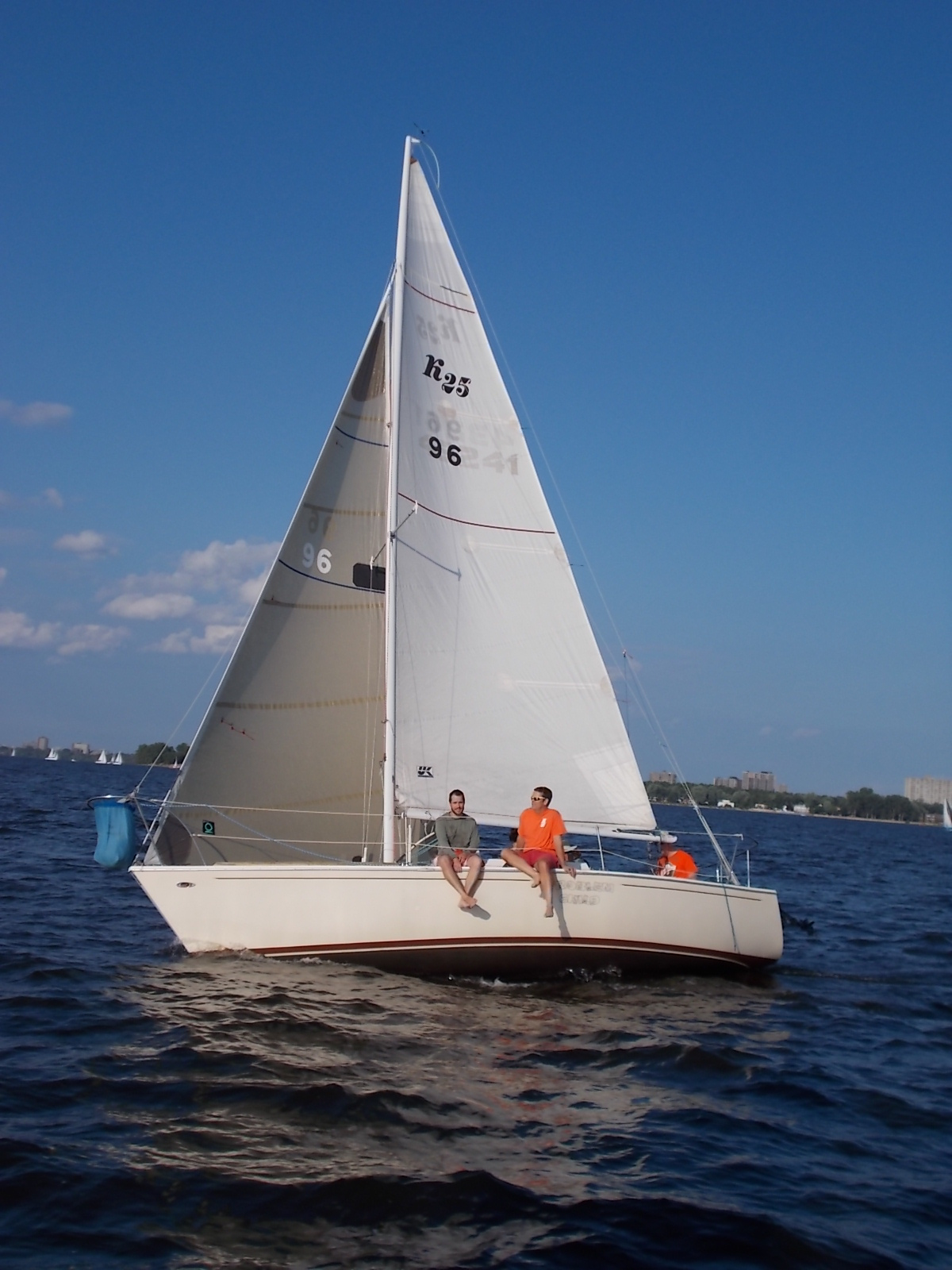

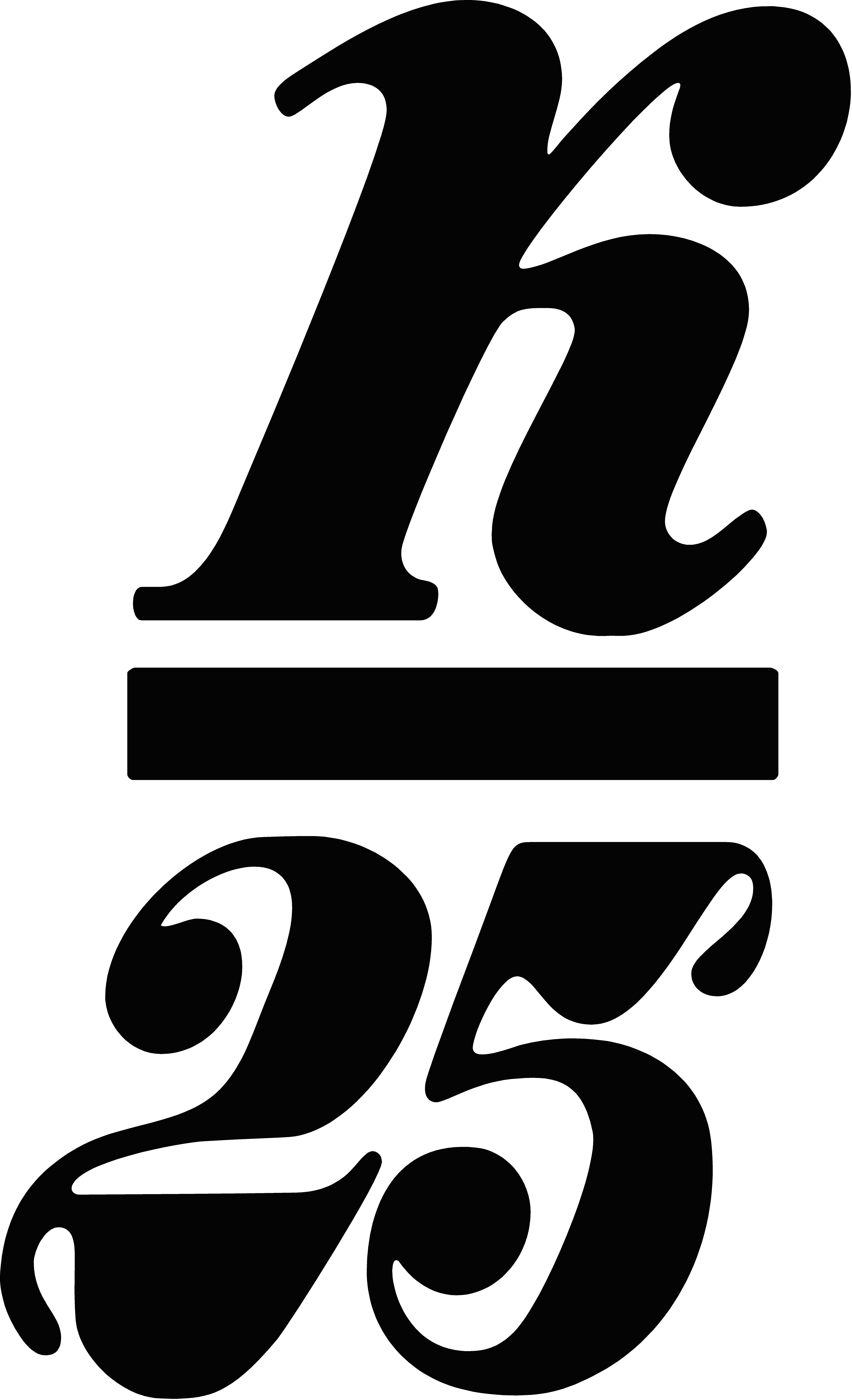

Development
- Designer: Bruce Kirby
- Location: Canada
- Year: 1978
- No. built: 223
- Builder: Mirage Yachts
- Role: racer
- Name: Kirby 25

Boat
- Displacement: 3,150 lb (1,429 kg)
- Draft: 4.17 ft (1.27 m)

Hull
- Type: Monohull
- Construction: Fibreglass
- LOA: 25.17 ft (7.67 m)
- LWL: 20.75 ft (6.32 m)
- Beam: 8.75 ft (2.67 m)
- Engine: outboard motor

Hull appendages
- Keel: fin keel
- Ballast: 1,150 lb (522 kg)
- Rudder: internally-mounted spade-type rudder

Rig
- General: Fractional rigged sloop
- I foretriangle height: 26.50 ft (8.08 m)
- J foretriangle base: 9.00 ft (2.74 m)
- P mainsail luff: 30.25 ft (9.22 m)
- E mainsail foot: 11.25 ft (3.43 m)

Sails
- Mainsail area: 170.16 sq ft (15.808 m^{2})
- Jib/genoa area: 119.25 sq ft (11.079 m^{2})
- Total sail area: 289.41 sq ft (26.887 m^{2})

Racing
- Class association: MORC
- PHRF: 174 (average)

The Kirby 25 is a racing keelboat. Mirage Yachts in Canada built 223 from 1978 to 1983.

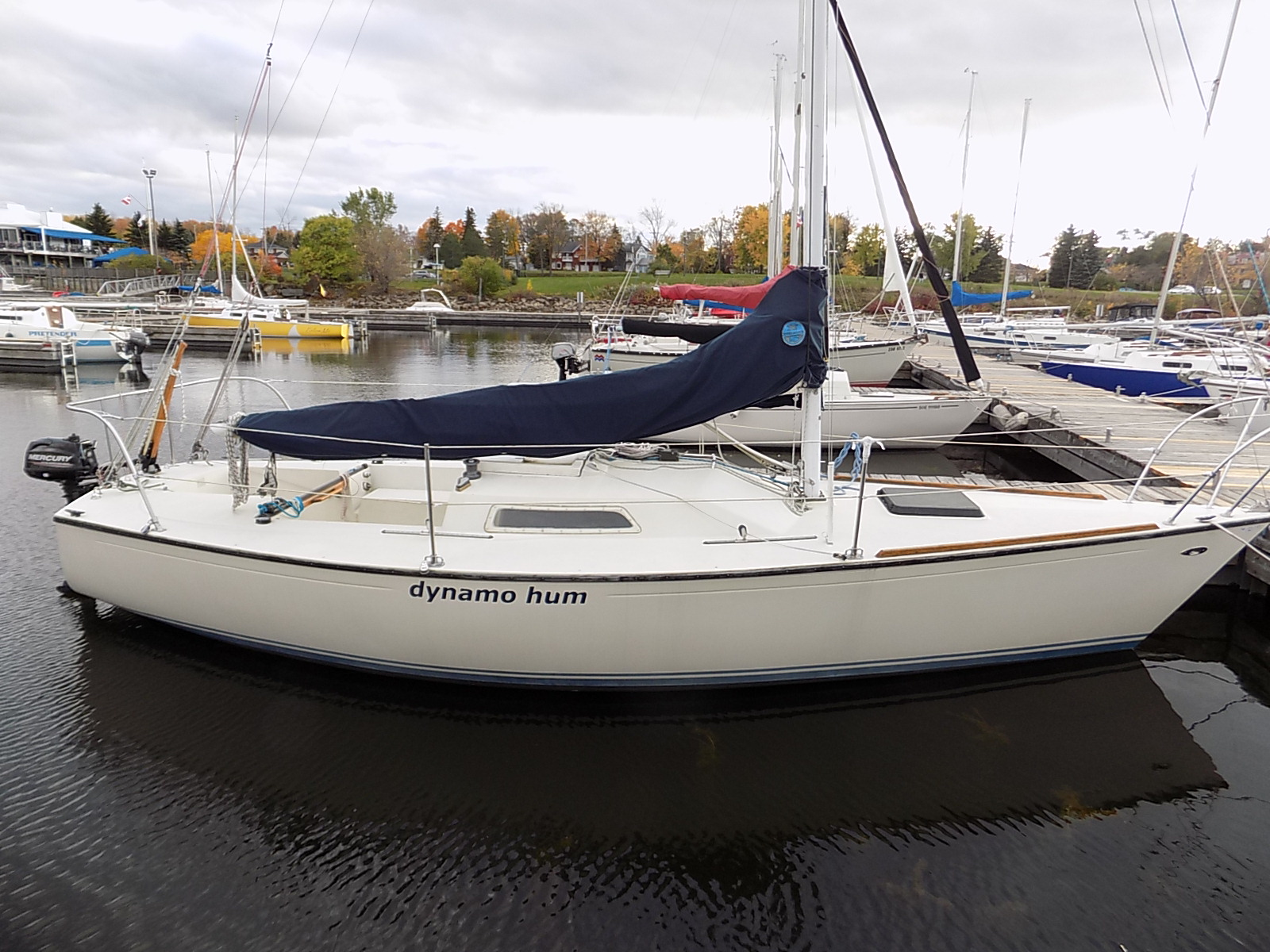
Kirby 25

Designed by Bruce Kirby as a J/24 competitor, the fibreglass hull has an internally-mounted spade-type rudder.

It has sleeping accommodation for four people, with a double "V"-berth in the bow cabin and two straight settee berths in the main cabin. The interior is minimalist for racing and there are no provisions for a galley or head. Cabin headroom is 54 in (137 cm). It has a hull speed of 6.1 kn (11.30 km/h).

It has a fractional sloop rig.
