= Mirage 39 =

Sailboat class

Development
- Designer: H. Morton
- Location: Canada
- Year: 1989
- Builder: Mirage Yachts

Boat
- Displacement: 16,000 lb (7,257 kg)
- Draft: 6.17 ft (1.88 m)

Hull
- Type: Monohull
- Construction: Fiberglass
- LOA: 39.18 ft (11.94 m)
- LWL: 32.83 ft (10.01 m)
- Beam: 12.50 ft (3.81 m)
- Engine: Volvo Marine 27 hp (20 kW) diesel engine

Hull appendages
- Keel: fin keel
- Ballast: 6,000 lb (2,722 kg)

Rig
- General: Masthead sloop

Racing
- PHRF: 111 (average)

The Mirage 39 is a Canadian sailboat, that was designed by H. Morton and first built in 1989.

== Production ==
The boat was the final design built by Mirage Yachts in Canada, with only a few completed before the company was sold and all production ended later in 1989.

== Design ==
The Mirage 39 is a small recreational keelboat, built predominantly of fiberglass. It has a masthead sloop rig and a fixed fin keel. It displaces 16,000 lb (7,257 kg) and carries 6,000 lb (2,722 kg) of ballast.

The boat has a draft of 6.17 ft (1.88 m) with the standard keel.

The boat is fitted with a Swedish Volvo Penta diesel engine of 27 hp (20 kW). The fuel tank holds 40 U.S. gallons (150 L; 33 imp gal) and the fresh water tank has a capacity of 75 U.S. gallons (280 L; 62 imp gal).

The boat has a PHRF racing average handicap of 111. It has a hull speed of 7.68 kn (14.22 km/h).

== See also ==
- List of sailing boat types

Similar sailboats

- C&C 39
- C&C 40
- CS 40
- Santana 39
