= Mirage 27 (Perry) =

Sailboat class

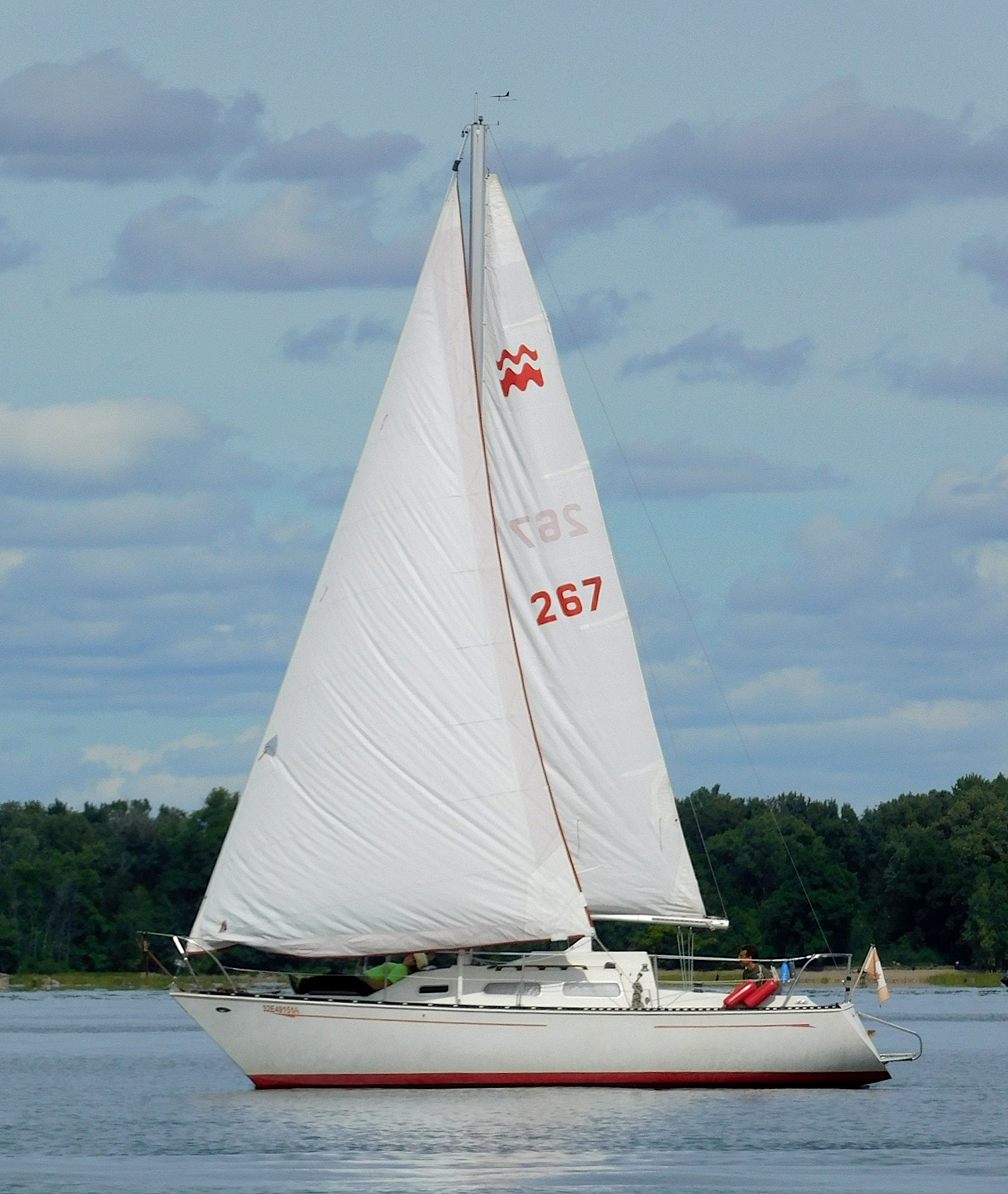
- Robert Perry designed Mirage 27

Development
- Designer: Robert Perry
- Location: Canada
- Year: 1980
- Builder: Mirage Yachts
- Name: Mirage 27

Boat
- Displacement: 5,200 lb (2,359 kg)
- Draft: 4.33 ft (1.32 m)

Hull
- Type: Monohull
- Construction: Fibreglass
- LOA: 27.92 ft (8.51 m)
- LWL: 21.67 ft (6.61 m)
- Beam: 9.25 ft (2.82 m)
- Engine: inboard engine

Hull appendages
- Keel: fin keel
- Ballast: 2,200 lb (998 kg)
- Rudder: internally-mounted spade-type rudder

Rig
- General: Masthead sloop
- I foretriangle height: 33.60 ft (10.24 m)
- J foretriangle base: 11.00 ft (3.35 m)
- P mainsail luff: 28.50 ft (8.69 m)
- E mainsail foot: 9.00 ft (2.74 m)

Sails
- Mainsail area: 128.25 sq ft (11.915 m^{2})
- Jib/genoa area: 184.80 sq ft (17.168 m^{2})
- Total sail area: 313.05 sq ft (29.083 m^{2})

The Mirage 27 (Perry) is a recreational keelboat built by Mirage Yachts in Canada.

Designed by Robert Perry, it is a derivative of the Perry-designed Mirage 26, modified with a reverse transom and a transom-mounted rudder. It replaced the Mirage 26 in the company line. The fibreglass hull has an internally-mounted spade-type rudder and a fixed fin keel. It has a hull speed of 6.24 kn (11.56 km/h).

It has a masthead sloop rig.

It is not related to the Mirage 27 designed by Peter Schmidt.

== Gallery ==
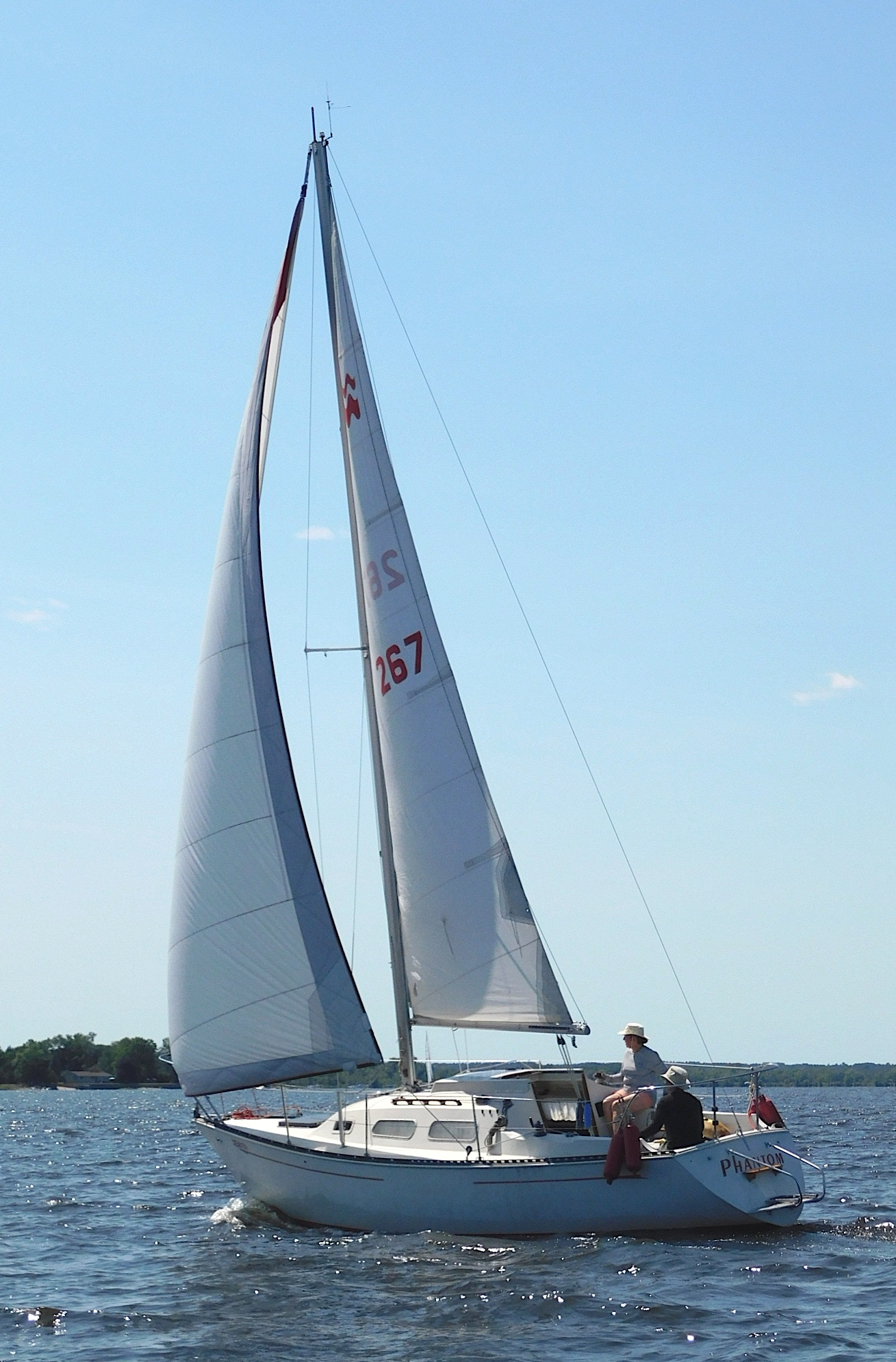
Mirage 27 (Perry) showing transom configuration

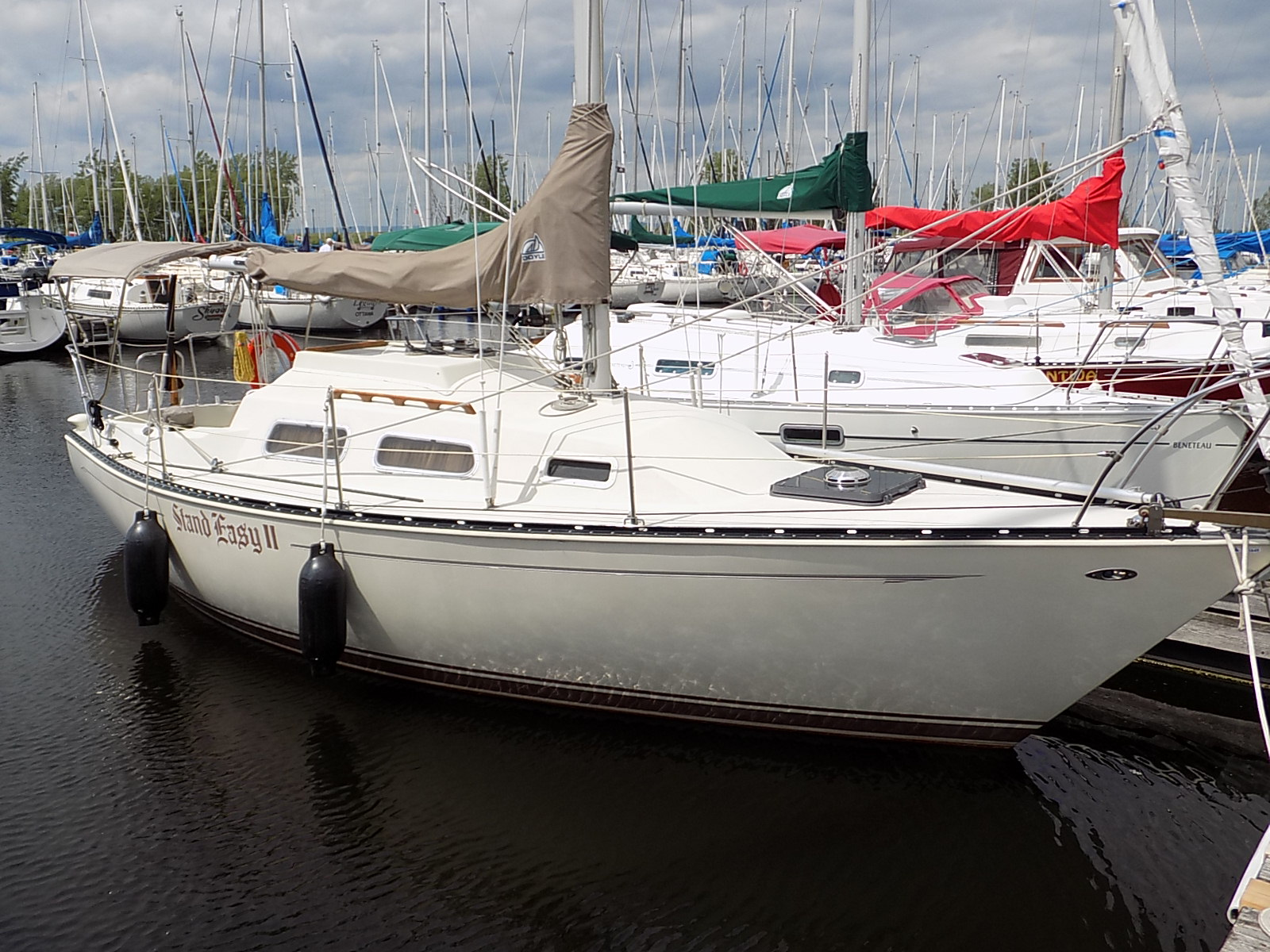
Mirage 27 (Perry)
