= C&C 27 =

Canadian keelboat built 1970–1982

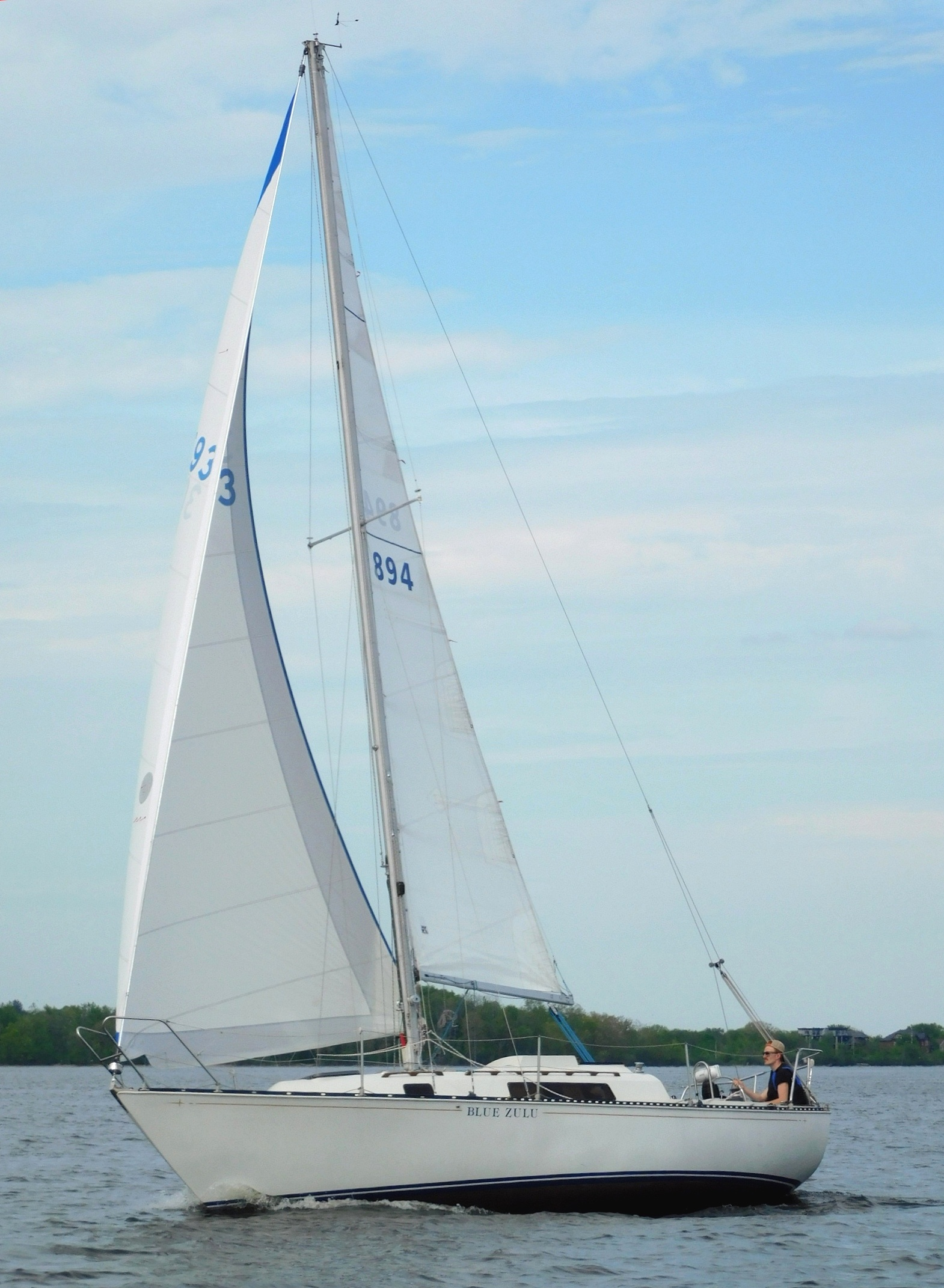
- C&C 27 Mark III

Development
- Designer: Robert W. Ball
- Location: Canada
- Year: 1970
- No. built: 975
- Builder: C&C Yachts
- Name: C&C 27

Boat
- Displacement: 5,500 lb (2,495 kg)
- Draft: 4.25 ft (1.30 m)

Hull
- Type: Monohull
- Construction: Fibreglass
- LOA: 27.86 ft (8.49 m)
- LWL: 22.86 ft (6.97 m)
- Beam: 9.16 ft (2.79 m)
- Engine: Yanmar 2GM Diesel motor

Hull appendages
- Keel: fin keel
- Ballast: 2,116 lb (960 kg)
- Rudder: internally-mounted spade-type rudder

Rig
- General: Masthead sloop
- I foretriangle height: 37.00 ft (11.28 m)
- J foretriangle base: 11.17 ft (3.40 m)
- P mainsail luff: 31.00 ft (9.45 m)
- E mainsail foot: 10.00 ft (3.05 m)

Sails
- Mainsail area: 155.00 sq ft (14.400 m^{2})
- Jib/genoa area: 206.65 sq ft (19.198 m^{2})
- Total sail area: 361.65 sq ft (33.598 m^{2})

The C&C 27 is a series of recreational keelboats. It was one of C&C Yachts' most successful models, with 975 built from 1970 to 1982.

Most were built in Ontario, Canada, with smaller numbers built south of the border and in Germany.

The design evolved during 12 years of production, and today they are referred to as Mark I to Mark IV, although this designation was not used by C&C. The Mark V was a new design, unrelated to earlier versions.

All had a fibreglass hull with a balsa core deck. It has a fixed fin keel and an internally mounted spade-type rudder. It has a masthead sloop rig. Theoretical hull speed is around 6.3 knots.

What are now known as Marks I and II were built from 1970 to 1974. They both had tillers, travellers aft of the cockpit, and Atomic inboard engines. The Mark II had the same sail area as the Mark I, though the mast was two feet taller. Lower shrouds were doubled.

From 1974 a new mould was used for the hull, and this is now known as the Mark III. It has a longer cockpit, with the traveller mounted on the coach roof. Optional wheel steering, and diesel power were available from 1978. LOA was increased but ballast decreased, keeping displacement the same. Sail area was increased, with a mast two feet higher than the Mark II. A bow anchor locker was added.

Mark IV, built in 1981 and 1982, had the forestay moved aft to make space for a bow roller.

== Gallery ==
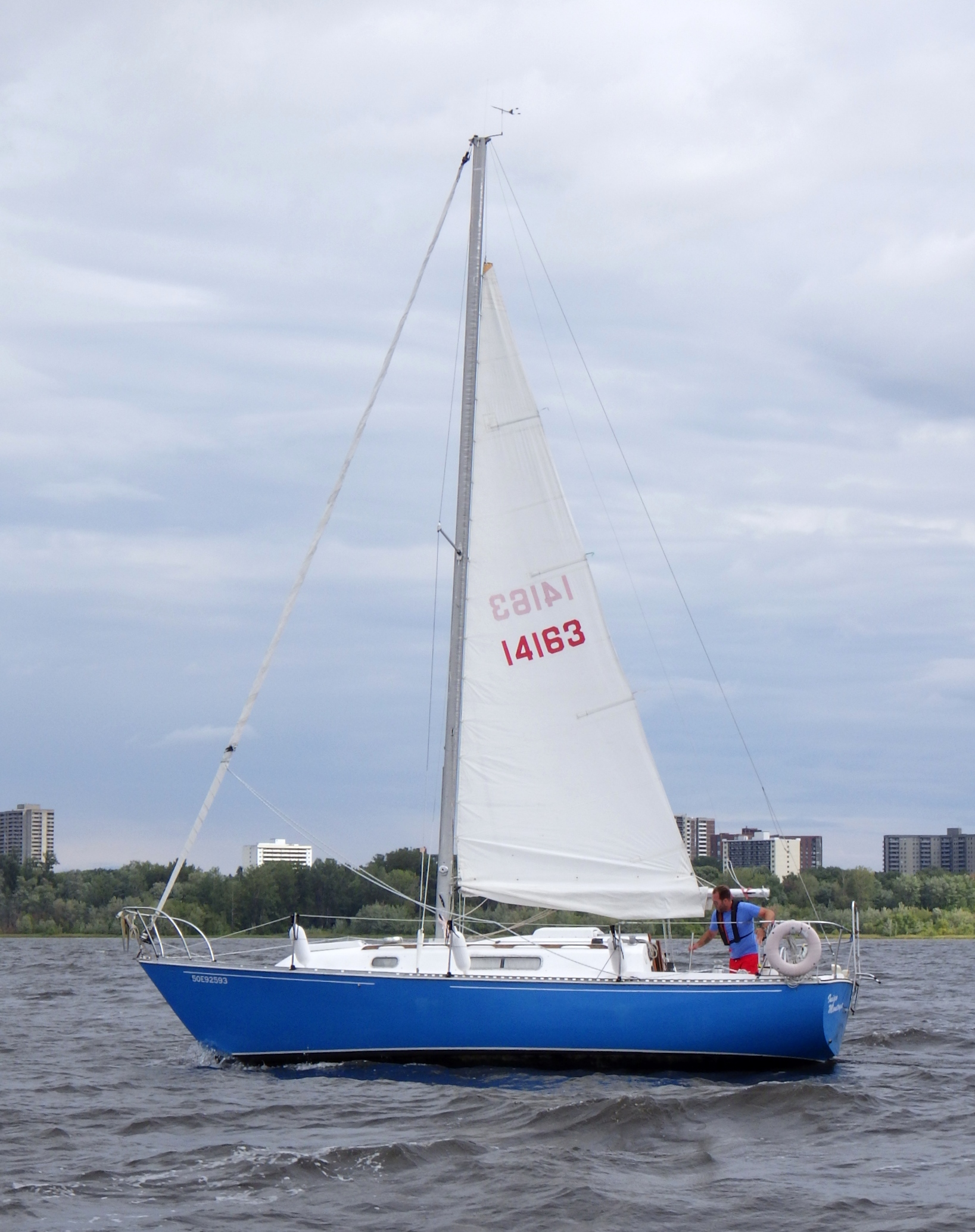
C&C 27 Mark I

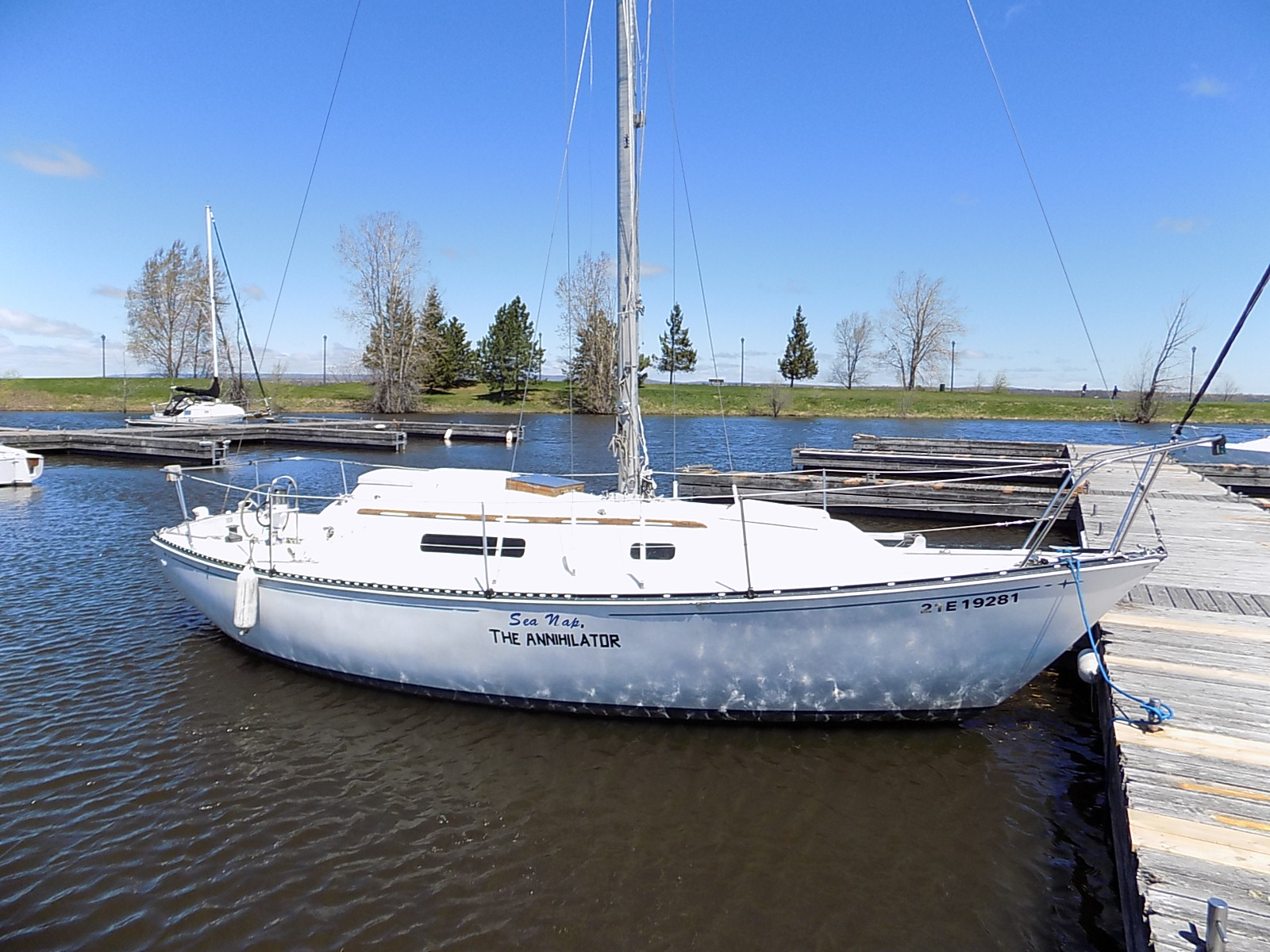
C&C 27 Mark II

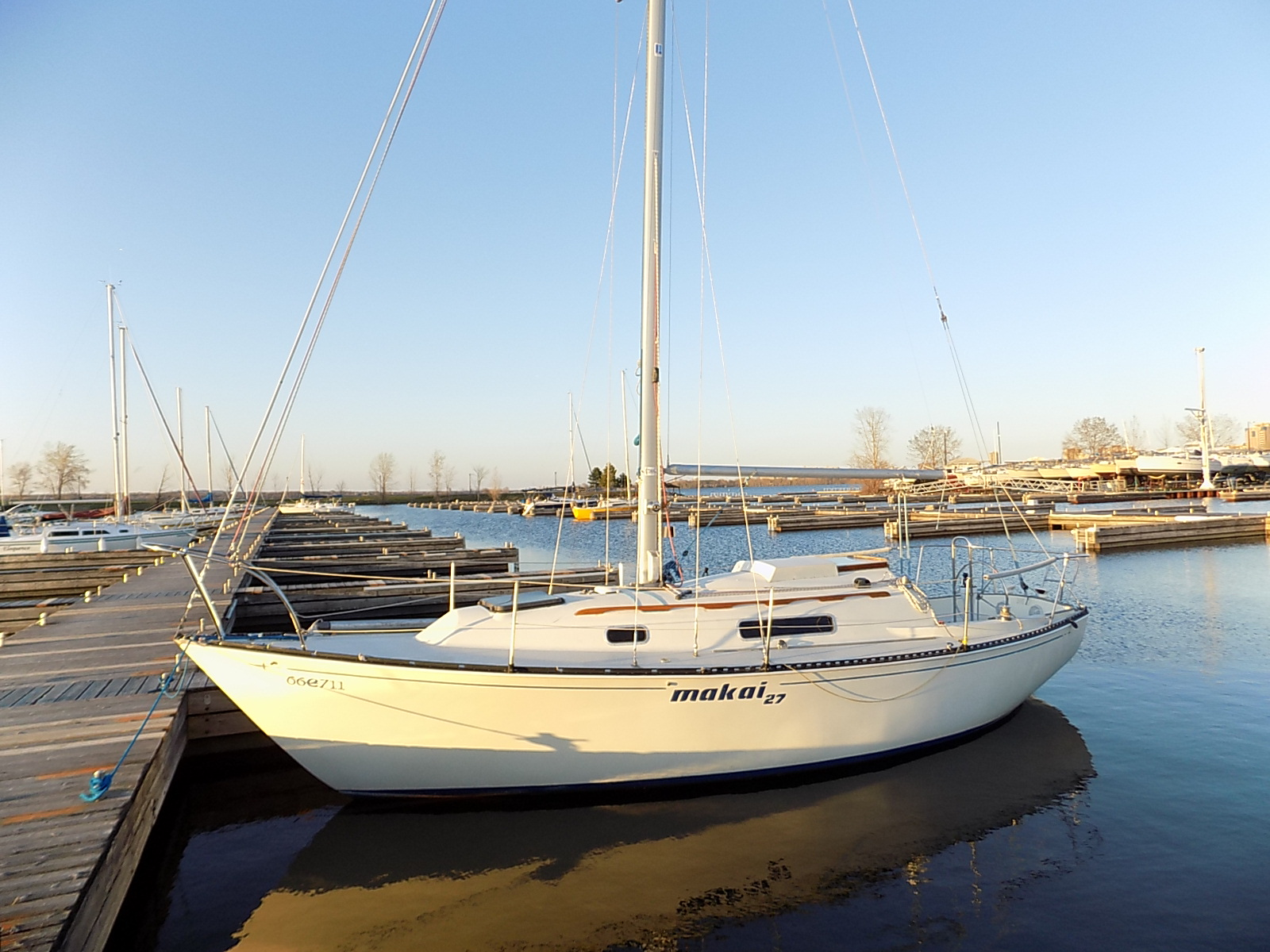
C&C 27 Mk III

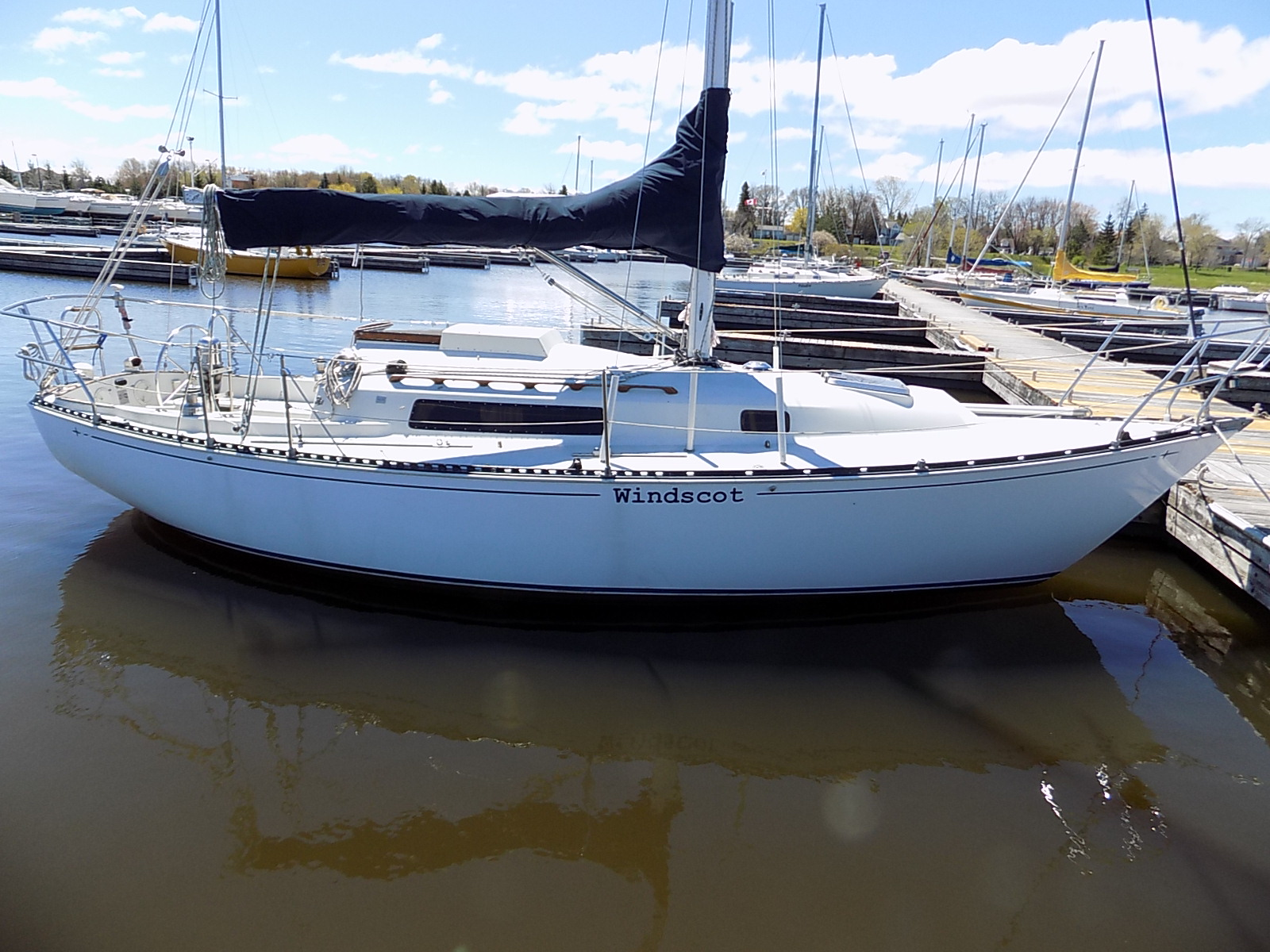
C&C 27 Mark IV
