= Sun Way 27 =

Recreational keelboat

Development
- Designer: Philippe Harlé
- Location: France
- Year: 1987
- Builder: Jeanneau
- Role: Cruiser

Boat
- Displacement: 5,027 lb (2,280 kg)
- Draft: 5.00 ft (1.52 m)

Hull
- Type: monohull
- Construction: fiberglass
- LOA: 27.23 ft (8.30 m)
- LWL: 21.50 ft (6.55 m)
- Beam: 9.45 ft (2.88 m)
- Engine: Yanmar diesel engine

Hull appendages
- Keel: fin keel
- Ballast: 1,936 lb (878 kg)
- Rudder: transom-mounted rudder

Rig
- Rig type: Bermuda rig
- I foretriangle height: 31.80 ft (9.69 m)
- J foretriangle base: 9.70 ft (2.96 m)
- P mainsail luff: 26.60 ft (8.11 m)
- E mainsail foot: 9.20 ft (2.80 m)

Sails
- Sailplan: masthead sloop
- Mainsail area: 122.36 sq ft (11.368 m^{2})
- Jib/genoa area: 154.23 sq ft (14.328 m^{2})
- Total sail area: 276.59 sq ft (25.696 m^{2})

The Sun Way 27 is a French sailboat that was designed by Philippe Harlé as a cruiser and first built in 1987.

== Production ==
The design was built by Jeanneau in France, starting in 1987, but it is now out of production.

== Design ==
The Sun Way 27 is a recreational keelboat, built predominantly of fiberglass, with wood trim. It has a masthead sloop rig. The hull has a raked stem, a plumb transom, a transom-hung rudder controlled by a tiller and a fixed fin keel. It displaces 5,027 lb (2,280 kg) and carries 1,936 lb (878 kg) of ballast.

The boat has a draft of 5.00 ft (1.52 m) with the standard keel and is fitted with a Japanese Yanmar diesel engine for docking and maneuvering.

The design has a hull speed of 6.21 kn (11.50 km/h).

== See also ==
- List of sailing boat types

Similar sailboats

- Aloha 27
- C&C 27
- Cal 27
- Cal 2-27
- Cal 3-27
- Catalina 27
- Catalina 270
- Catalina 275 Sport
- Crown 28
- CS 27
- Edel 820
- Express 27
- Halman Horizon
- Hotfoot 27
- Hullmaster 27
- Hunter 27
- Hunter 27-2
- Hunter 27-3
- Irwin 27
- Island Packet 27
- Mirage 27 (Perry)
- Mirage 27 (Schmidt)
- O'Day 272
- Orion 27-2
- Tanzer 27
- Watkins 27
- Watkins 27P
