= Halman Horizon =

Sailboat class

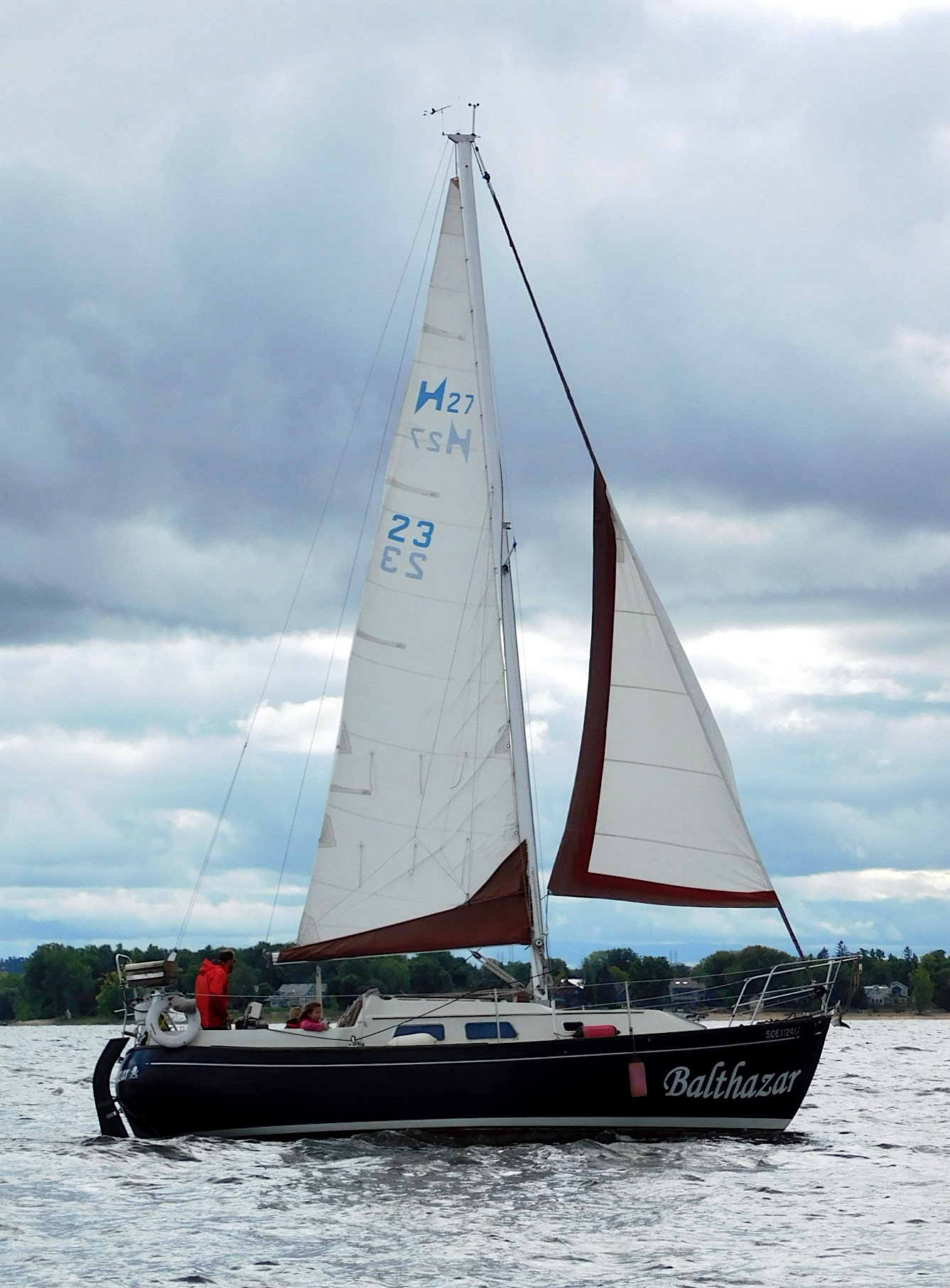

Development
- Designer: Michael Volmer
- Location: Canada
- Year: 1982
- No. built: 42
- Builder: Halman Manufacturing
- Name: Halman Horizon

Boat
- Displacement: 7,000 lb (3,175 kg)
- Draft: 4.00 ft (1.22 m)

Hull
- Type: Monohull
- Construction: Fibreglass
- LOA: 27.00 ft (8.23 m)
- LWL: 23.00 ft (7.01 m)
- Beam: 9.67 ft (2.95 m)
- Engine: Volvo 15 hp (11 kW) diesel engine

Hull appendages
- Keel: fin keel
- Ballast: 2,250 lb (1,021 kg)
- Rudder: skeg-mounted rudder

Rig
- Rig type: Bermuda rig

Sails
- Sailplan: Masthead sloop

The Halman Horizon, also referred to as the Halman 27, is a Canadian sailboat that was designed by Michael Volmer as a cruiser and first built in 1982.

== Production ==
The design was built by Halman Manufacturing in Beamsville, Ontario, Canada, but it is now out of production. A total of 42 examples were completed, with production commencing in 1982.

The designer, Michael Volmer, was also CEO of the company.

== Design ==
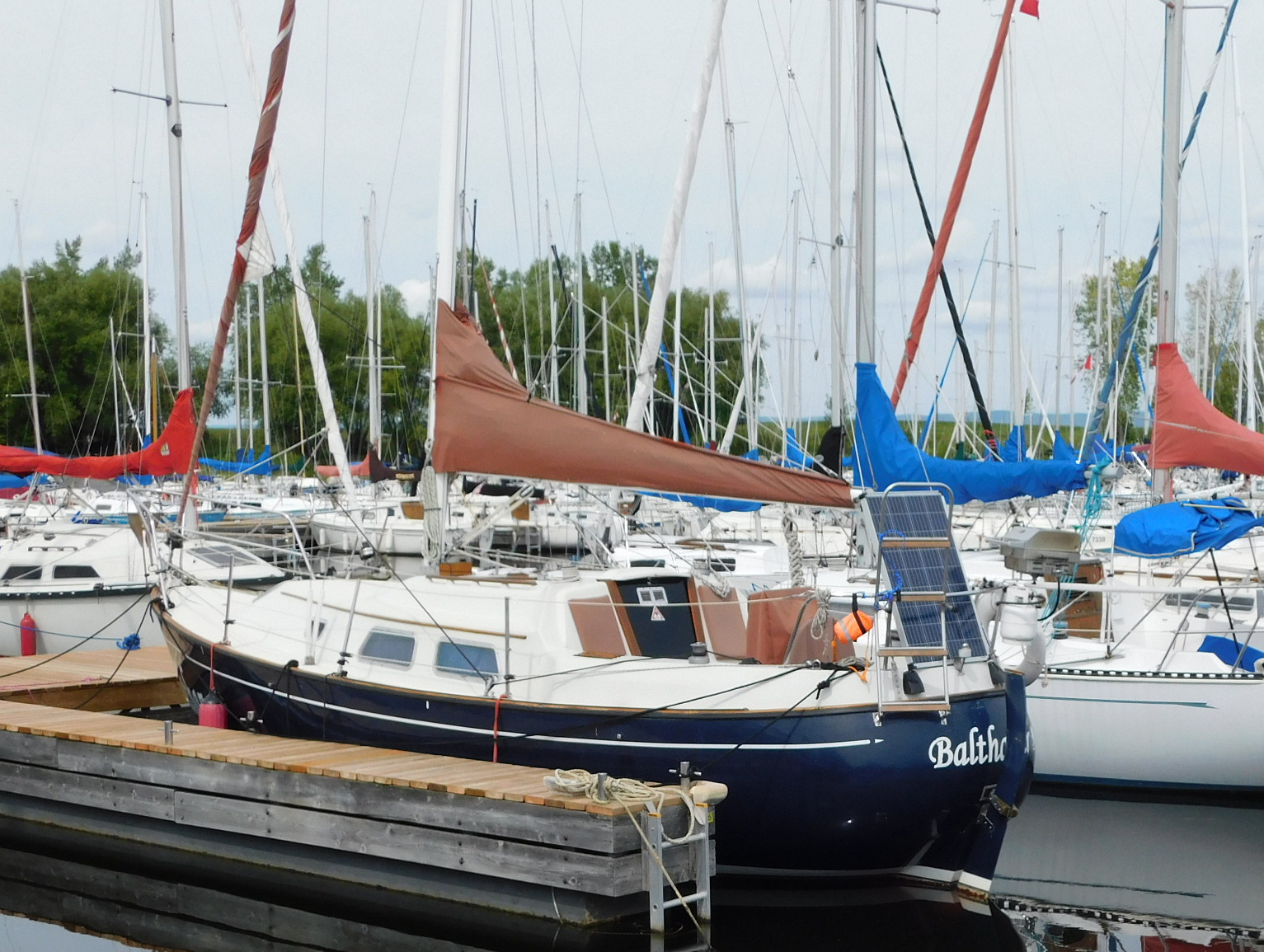
Halman Horizon showing the rounded transom and rudder arrangement

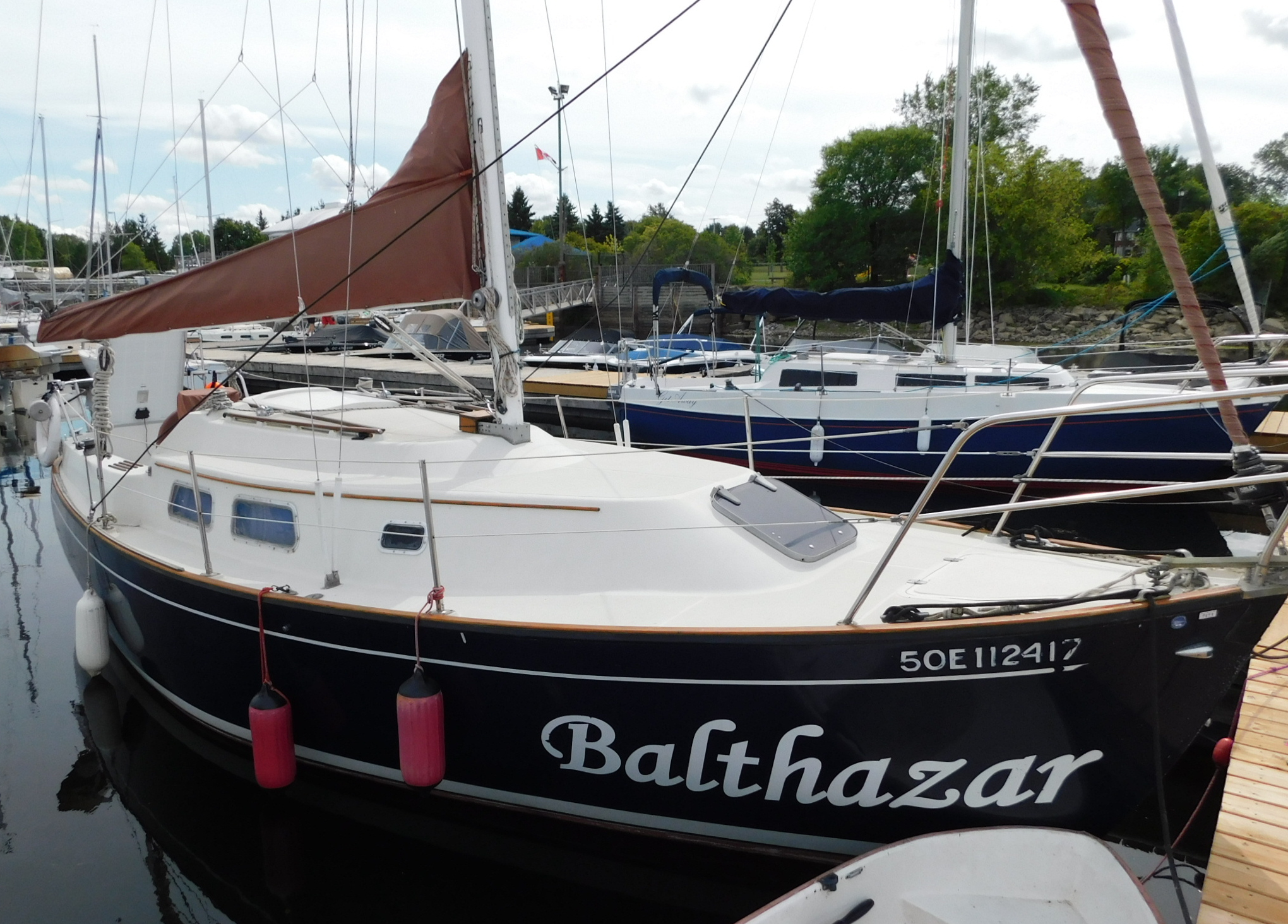
Halman Horizon

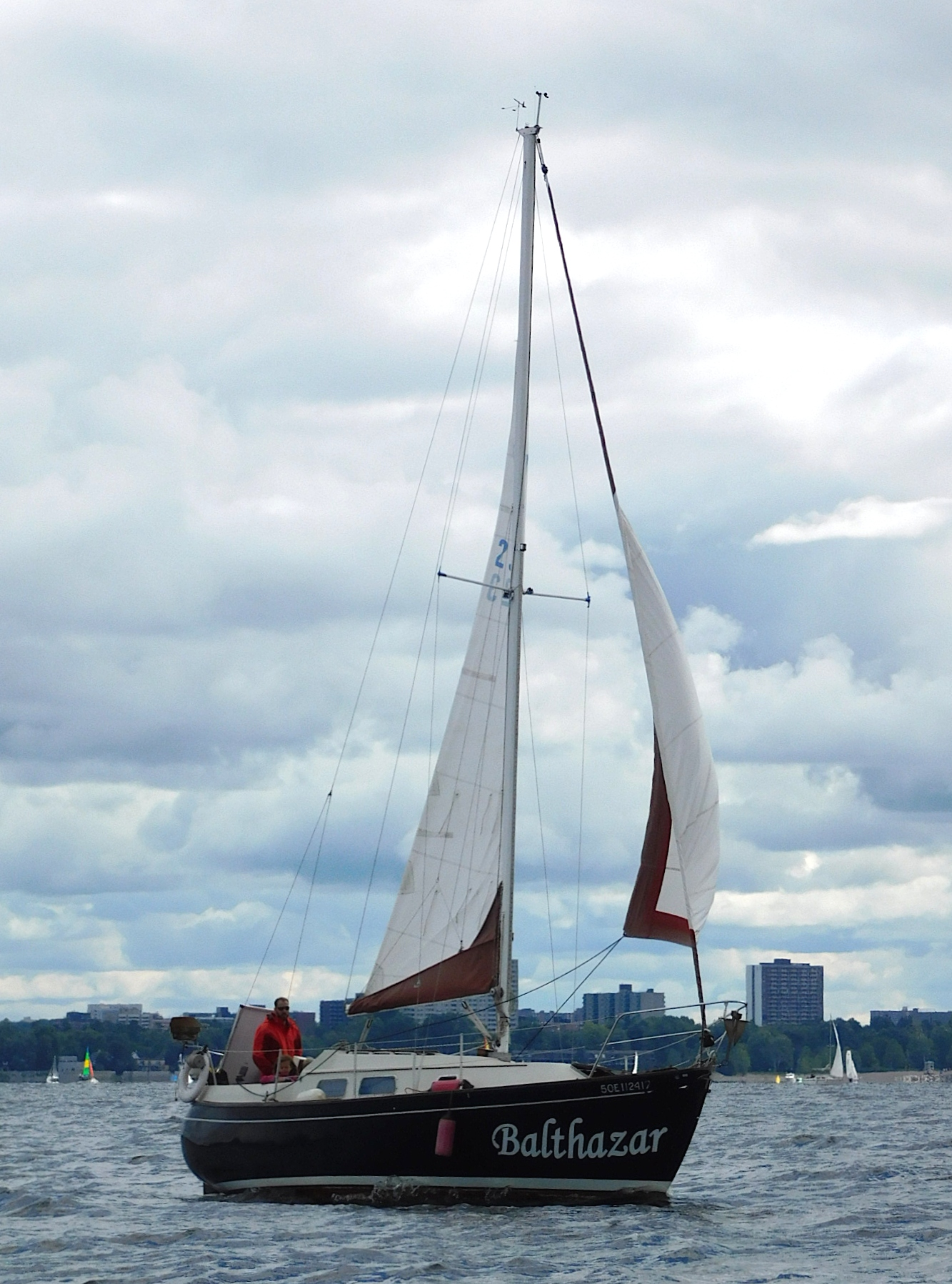
Halman Horizon

The Horizon is a recreational keelboat, built predominantly of fibreglass, with wood trim. The majority were built with a masthead sloop rig, although some were built with a cutter rig. It features a spooned raked stem, a very rounded and bulbous transom, a skeg-mounted rudder, with a portion protruding around the transom, controlled by a wheel and a fixed fin keel. It displaces 7,000 lb (3,175 kg) and carries 2,250 lb (1,021 kg) of ballast.

The boat has a draft of 4.00 ft (1.22 m) with the standard fin keel. It was factory-fitted with a Swedish Volvo diesel engine of 9 hp (7 kW). The fuel tank holds 10 U.S. gallons (38 L; 8.3 imp gal), while the fresh water tank has a capacity of 30 U.S. gallons (110 L; 25 imp gal).

The design has a hull speed of 6.43 kn (11.91 km/h).

== See also ==
- List of sailing boat types

Related development

- Halman 20

Similar sailboats

- Aloha 27
- C&C 27
- Cal 27
- Cal 2-27
- Cal 3-27
- Catalina 27
- Catalina 270
- Catalina 275 Sport
- Crown 28
- CS 27
- Edel 820
- Express 27
- Fantasia 27
- Hotfoot 27
- Hullmaster 27
- Hunter 27
- Hunter 27-2
- Hunter 27-3
- Irwin 27
- Island Packet 27
- Mirage 27 (Perry)
- Mirage 27 (Schmidt)
- O'Day 272
- Orion 27-2
- Tanzer 27
- Watkins 27
- Watkins 27P
