= Edel 820 =

Sailboat class

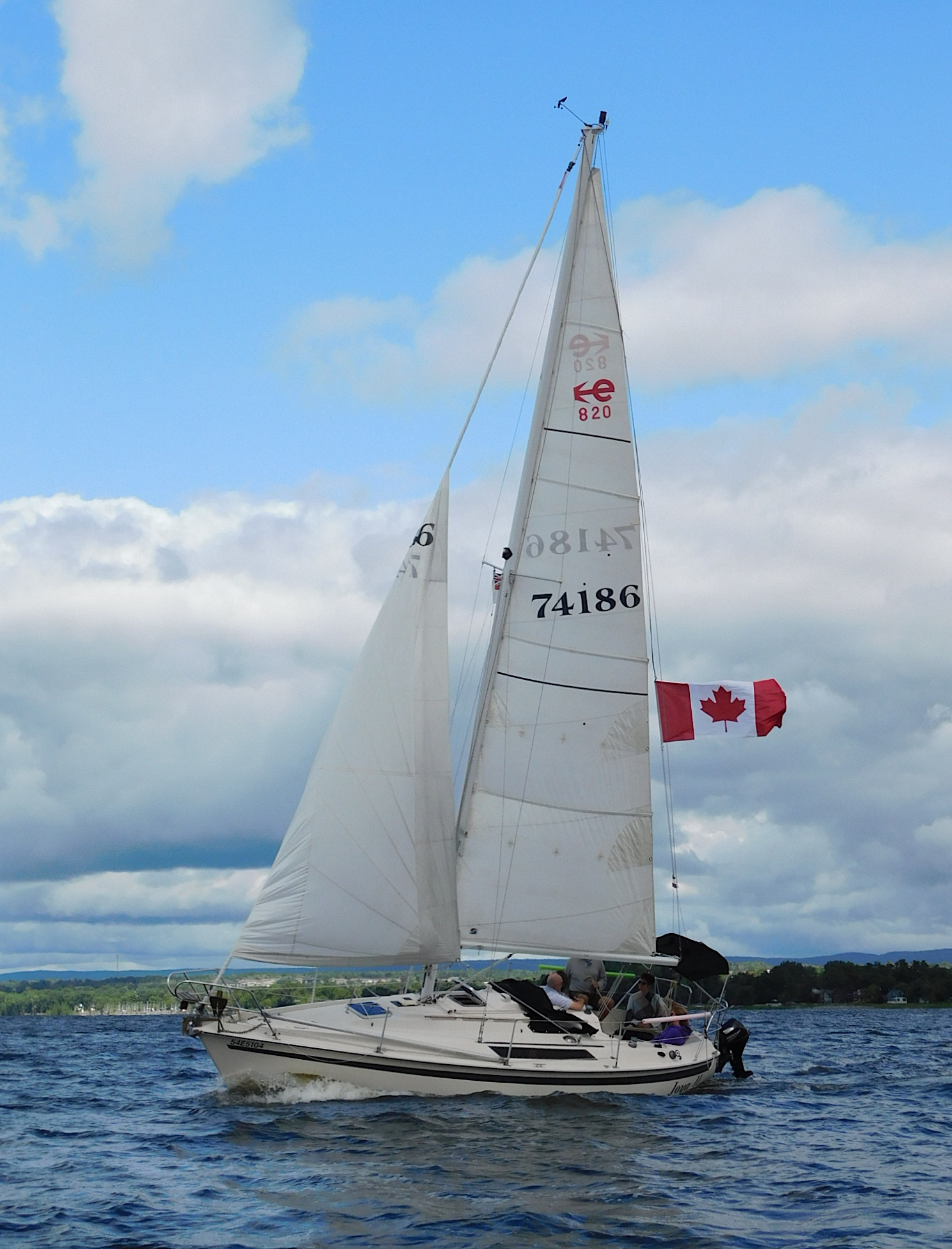

Development
- Designer: Maurice Edel
- Location: France
- Year: 1980
- No. built: 60
- Builders: Construction Nautic Edel, Edel Canada
- Name: Edel 820

Boat
- Displacement: 7,050 lb (3,198 kg)
- Draft: 4.33 ft (1.32 m)

Hull
- Type: Monohull
- Construction: Fiberglass
- LOA: 26.92 ft (8.21 m)
- LWL: 22.50 ft (6.86 m)
- Beam: 9.67 ft (2.95 m)
- Engine: Volvo Penta MD7A 13 hp (10 kW) diesel engine with saildrive

Hull appendages
- Keel: fin keel
- Ballast: 2,646 lb (1,200 kg)
- Rudder: internally-mounted spade-type rudder

Rig
- Rig type: Bermuda rig
- I foretriangle height: 39.00 ft (11.89 m)
- J foretriangle base: 10.80 ft (3.29 m)
- P mainsail luff: 34.00 ft (10.36 m)
- E mainsail foot: 10.30 ft (3.14 m)

Sails
- Sailplan: Masthead sloop
- Mainsail area: 175.10 sq ft (16.267 m^{2})
- Jib/genoa area: 210.60 sq ft (19.565 m^{2})
- Total sail area: 385.70 sq ft (35.833 m^{2})

The Edel 820 is a French sailboat that was designed by Maurice Edel and first built in 1980.

== Production ==
The design was built by Construction Nautic Edel in France and also at its Canadian subsidiary, Edel Canada. Between 1980 and 1982 a total of 60 examples were completed. The boat is now out of production.

== Design ==
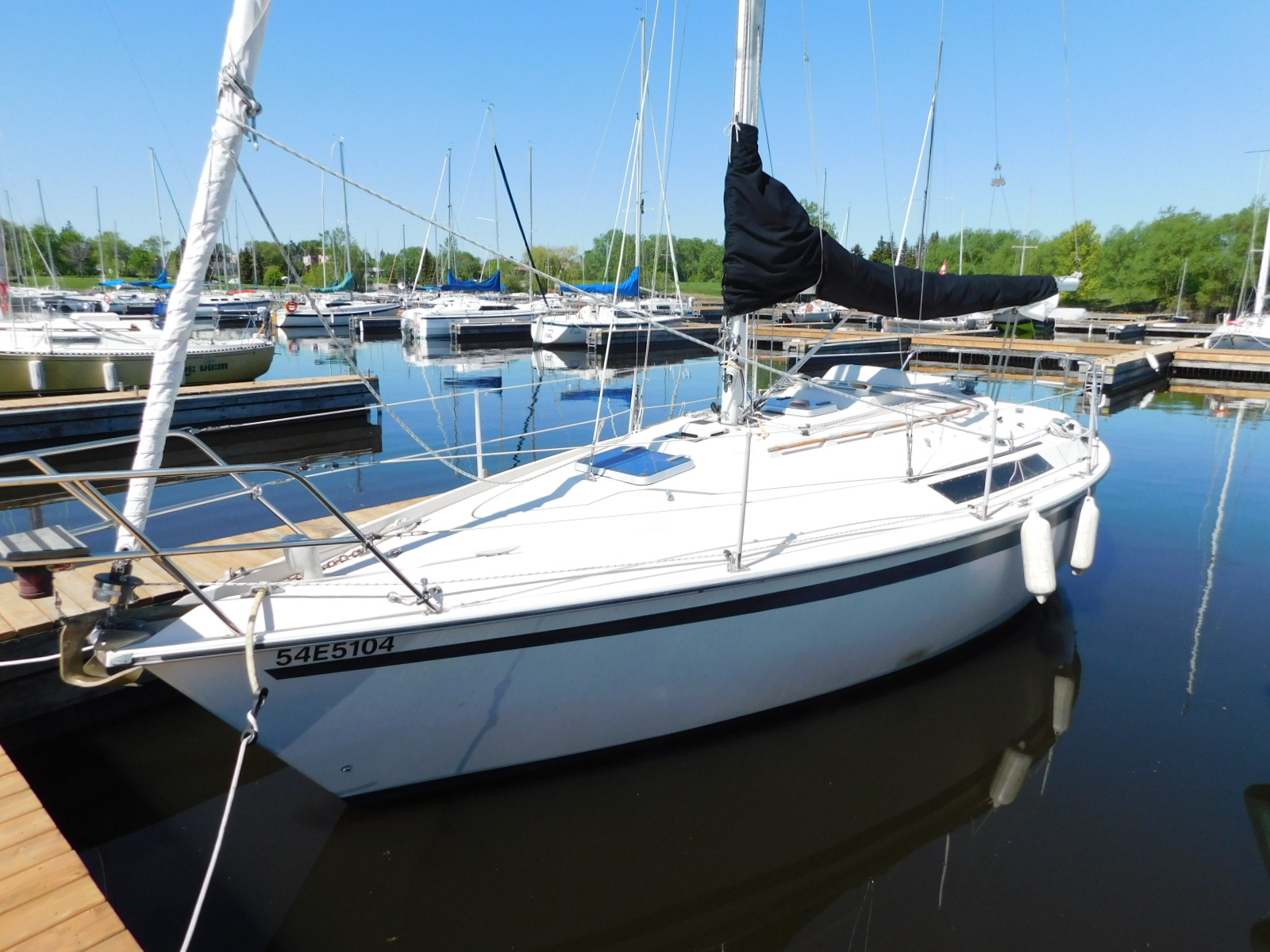
Edel 820

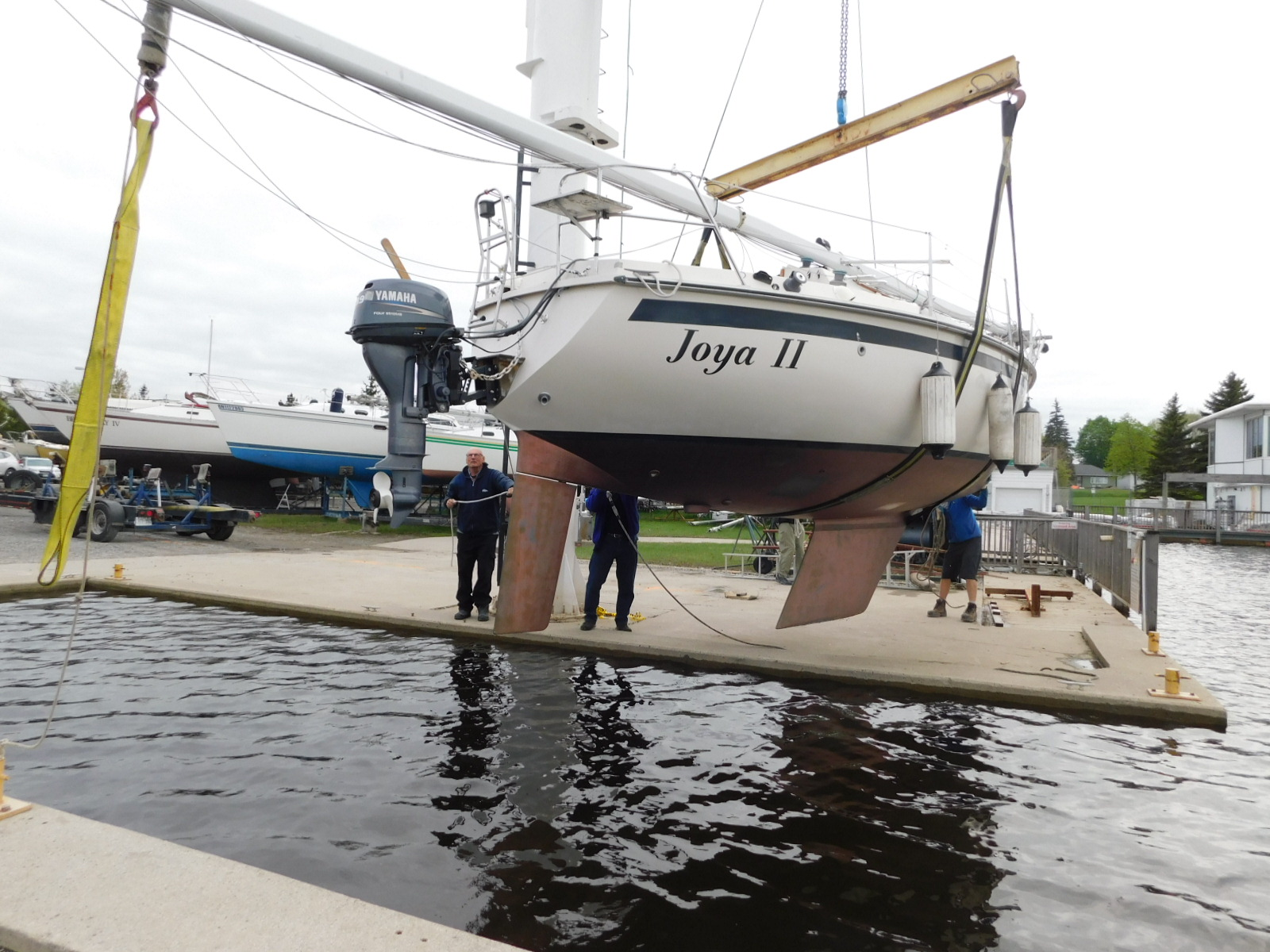
Edel 820 being launched, showing fin keel and rudder configuration

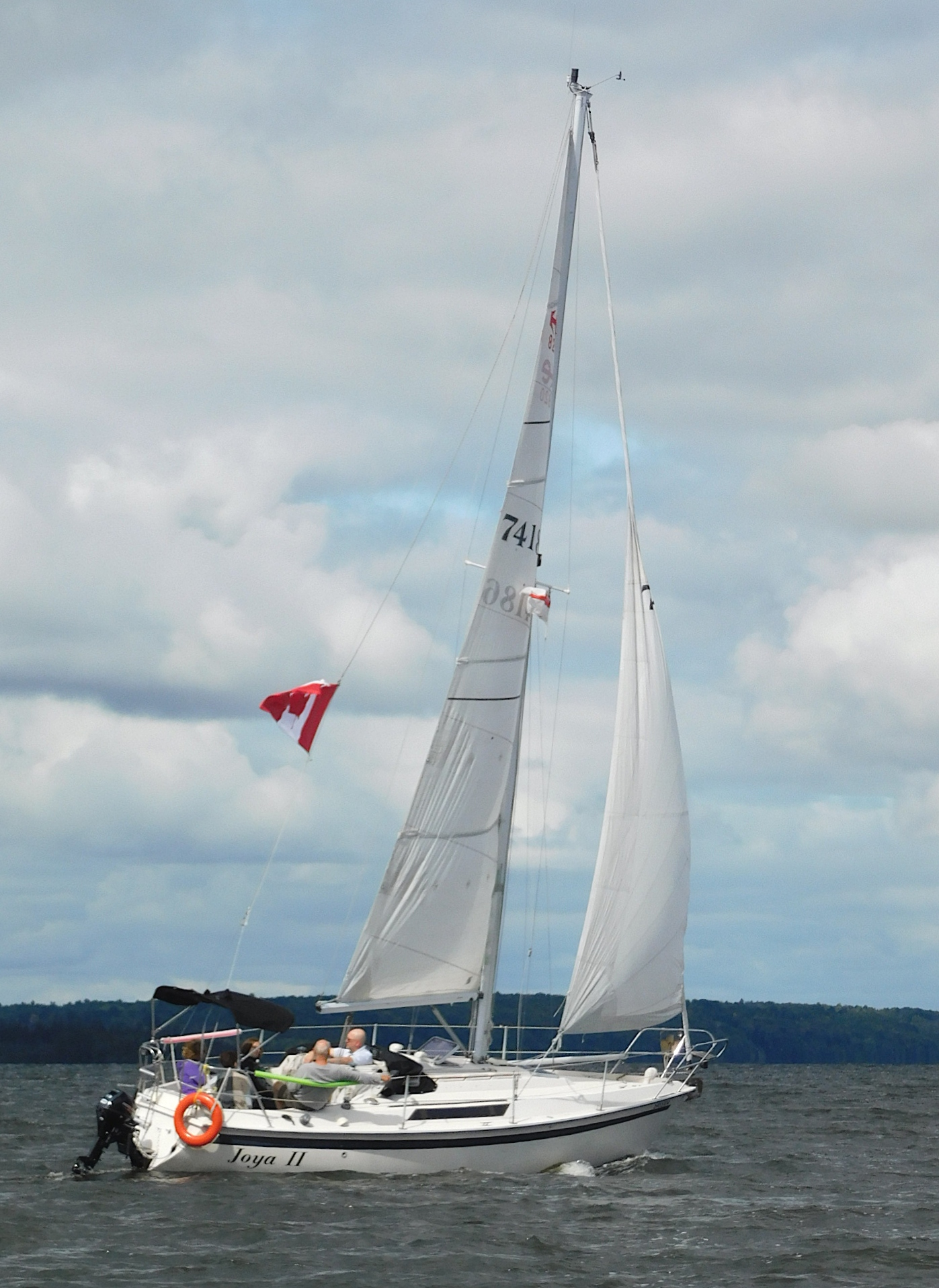
Edel 820

The Edel 820 is a recreational keelboat, built predominantly of fiberglass, with teak wood trim. It has a masthead sloop rig, a raked stem, a reverse transom, an internally mounted spade-type rudder controlled by a wheel or tiller and a fixed fin keel or stub keel and centreboard. It displaces 7,050 lb (3,198 kg) and carries 2,646 lb (1,200 kg) of ballast.

The keel-equipped version of the boat has a draft of 4.33 ft (1.32 m), while the centreboard-equipped version has a draft of 5.92 ft (1.80 m) with the centreboard extended and 3.28 ft (1.00 m) with it retracted.

The boat is fitted with a Swedish Volvo Penta MD7A diesel engine of 13 hp (10 kW) connected to a Volvo Penta 110S saildrive. Some boats have been retrofitted with a small outboard motor in place of the inboard diesel, for docking and maneuvering.

Below decks the design has 6 ft (183 cm) headroom. Sleeping accommodation is provided for six adults, with a "V"-berth forward, two berths in the main cabin and two aft berths. The design employs teak brightwork. The galley has a two-burner gimbaled propane-powered stove an ice box and a manually-pumped water system. There is also a navigation chart table and a head with an 18 U.S. gallons (68 L; 15 imp gal) tank.

The design has a hull speed of 6.36 kn (11.78 km/h).

== See also ==
- List of sailing boat types

Similar sailboats

- Aloha 27
- C&C 27
- C&C SR 27
- Cal 27
- Cal 2-27
- Cal 3-27
- Catalina 27
- Catalina 270
- Crown 28
- CS 27
- Express 27
- Fantasia 27
- Halman Horizon
- Hotfoot 27
- Hullmaster 27
- Hunter 27
- Hunter 27-2
- Hunter 27-3
- Island Packet 27
- Mirage 27 (Perry)
- Mirage 27 (Schmidt)
- O'Day 272
- Orion 27-2
- Tanzer 27
- Watkins 27
- Watkins 27P
