= Cal 2-27 =

Sailboat class

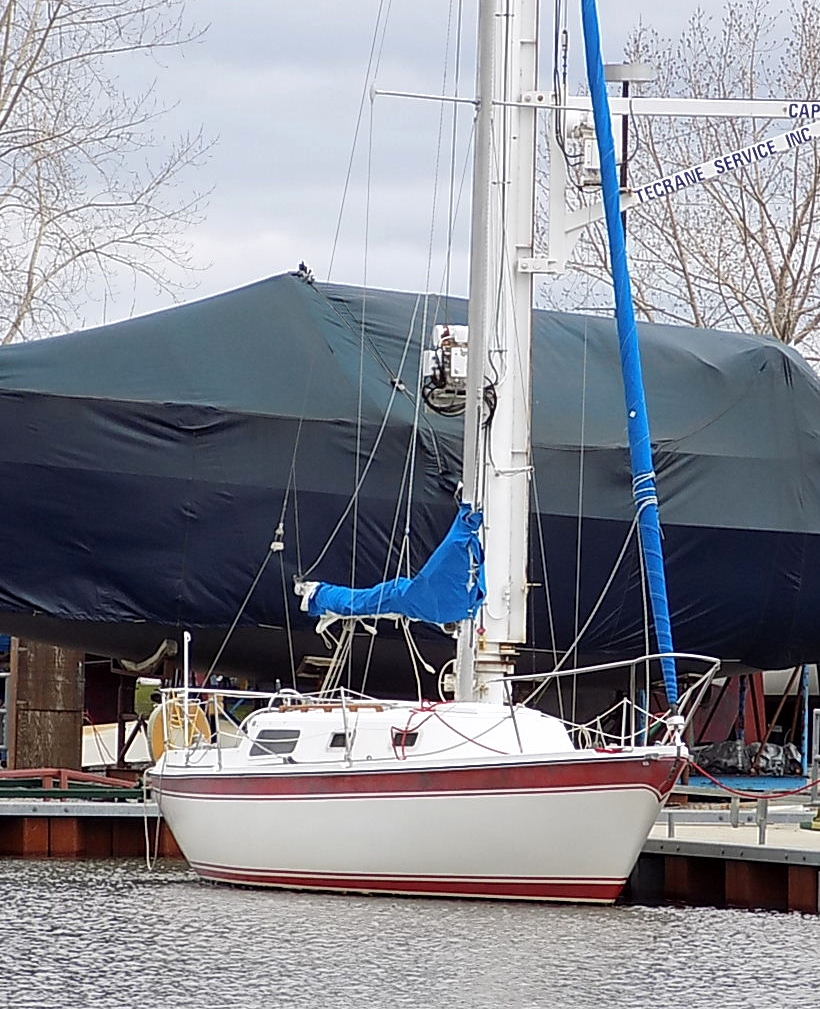

Development
- Designer: William Lapworth
- Location: United States
- Year: 1974
- No. built: 656
- Builder: Cal Yachts
- Name: Cal 2-27

Boat
- Displacement: 6,700 lb (3,039 kg)
- Draft: 4.25 ft (1.30 m)

Hull
- Type: Monohull
- Construction: Fiberglass
- LOA: 26.58 ft (8.10 m)
- LWL: 22.08 ft (6.73 m)
- Beam: 9.25 ft (2.82 m)
- Engine: Universal Atomic 4 gasoline engine

Hull appendages
- Keel: fin keel
- Ballast: 3,100 lb (1,406 kg)
- Rudder: internally-mounted spade-type rudder

Rig
- General: Masthead sloop
- I foretriangle height: 36.00 ft (10.97 m)
- J foretriangle base: 12.00 ft (3.66 m)
- P mainsail luff: 30.80 ft (9.39 m)
- E mainsail foot: 10.30 ft (3.14 m)

Sails
- Mainsail area: 158.62 sq ft (14.736 m^{2})
- Jib/genoa area: 216.00 sq ft (20.067 m^{2})
- Total sail area: 374.62 sq ft (34.803 m^{2})

The Cal 2-27 is an American sailboat, that was designed by William Lapworth and first built in 1974.

The Cal 2-27 design replaced the earlier Cal 27 and was replaced in turn in the Cal Yachts line, by the Cal 3-27 in 1983.

== Production ==
The Cal 2-27 was built by Cal Yachts (Jensen Marine) in the United States between 1974 and 1980, but it is now out of production. During its six-year production run 656 examples were built.

The boat was also developed into the Crown 28 in Canada by Calgan Marine.

== Design ==
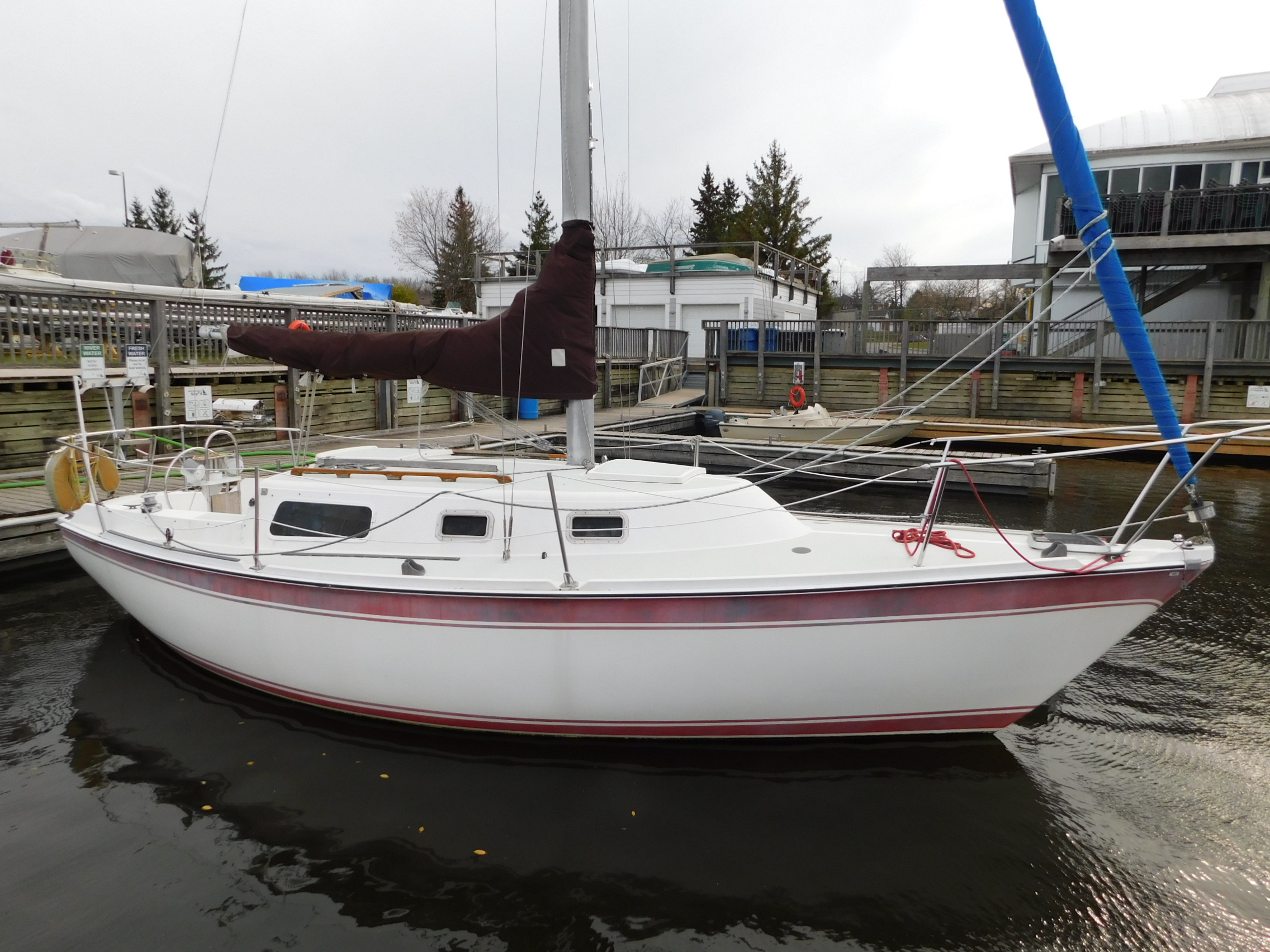
Cal 2-27

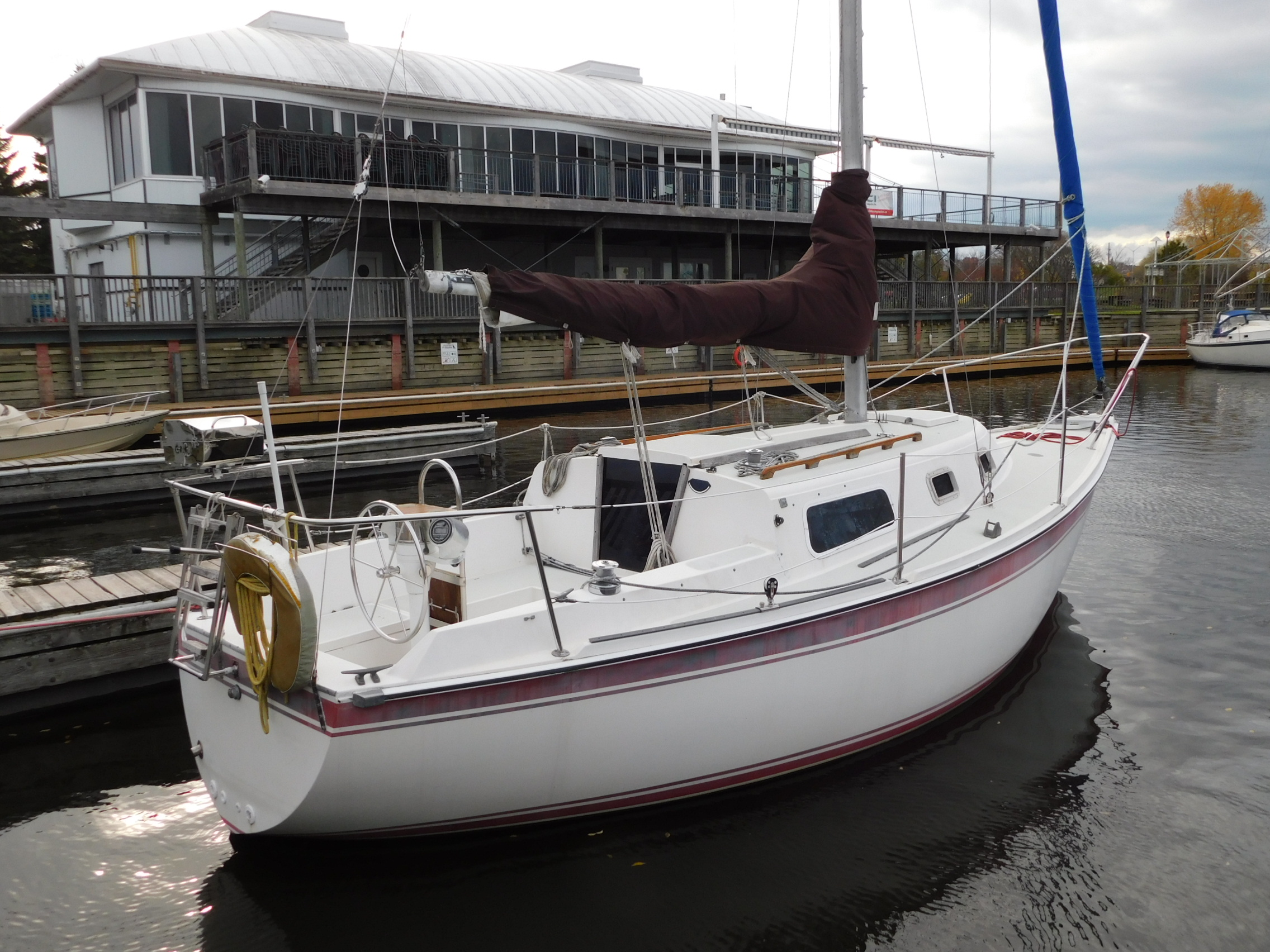
Cal 2-27

The Cal 2-27 is a small recreational keelboat, built predominantly of fiberglass, with wood trim. It has a masthead sloop rig, an internally-mounted spade-type rudder and a fixed fin keel. It displaces 6,700 lb (3,039 kg) and carries 3,100 lb (1,406 kg) of ballast. The boat has a draft of 4.25 ft (1.30 m) with the standard keel fitted.

The boat was initially factory-fitted with a Universal Atomic 4 gasoline engine, although later in the production run a Farymann diesel engine became an option. The fuel tank holds 25 U.S. gallons (95 L; 21 imp gal) and the fresh water tank has a capacity of 20 U.S. gallons (76 L; 17 imp gal).

The boat has a hull speed of 6.3 kn (11.67 km/h).

== See also ==
- List of sailing boat types

Related development

- Cal 27
- Cal 3-27
- Crown 28

Similar sailboats

- Aloha 27
- C&C 27
- Catalina 27
- Catalina 270
- Catalina 275 Sport
- CS 27
- Edel 820
- Express 27
- Fantasia 27
- Halman Horizon
- Hotfoot 27
- Hullmaster 27
- Hunter 27
- Hunter 27-2
- Hunter 27-3
- Island Packet 27
- Mirage 27 (Perry)
- Mirage 27 (Schmidt)
- O'Day 272
- Orion 27-2
- Tanzer 27
- Watkins 27
- Watkins 27P
