= Cal 3-27 =

Sailboat class

Development
- Designer: William Lapworth
- Location: United States
- Year: 1983
- Builder: Cal Yachts/Jensen Marine
- Name: Cal 3-27

Boat
- Displacement: 5,200 lb (2,359 kg)
- Draft: 5.00 ft (1.52 m)

Hull
- Type: Monohull
- Construction: Fiberglass
- LOA: 26.67 ft (8.13 m)
- LWL: 23.25 ft (7.09 m)
- Beam: 9.00 ft (2.74 m)
- Engine: Inboard motor

Hull appendages
- Keel: fin keel
- Ballast: 2,000 lb (907 kg)
- Rudder: internally-mounted spade-type rudder

Rig
- General: Masthead sloop
- I foretriangle height: 33.00 ft (10.06 m)
- J foretriangle base: 11.00 ft (3.35 m)
- P mainsail luff: 28.00 ft (8.53 m)
- E mainsail foot: 11.00 ft (3.35 m)

Sails
- Mainsail area: 154.00 sq ft (14.307 m^{2})
- Jib/genoa area: 181.50 sq ft (16.862 m^{2})
- Total sail area: 335.50 sq ft (31.169 m^{2})

The Cal 3-27 is an American sailboat, that was designed by William Lapworth and first built in 1983.

The Cal 3-27 is a development of the Cal 2-27, which was in turn a development of the Cal 27.

The Cal 3-27 was also marketed as the Cal 27 Mk III and then later just as the Cal 27.

== Production ==
The boat was built by Cal Yachts/Jensen Marine in the United States between 1983 and 1985, but it is now out of production.

== Design ==
The Cal 3-27 is a small recreational keelboat, built predominantly of fiberglass, with wood trim. It has a masthead sloop rig, an inboard motor, an internally-mounted spade-type rudder and a fixed fin keel. It displaces 5,200 lb (2,359 kg) and carries 2,000 lb (907 kg) of ballast.

The boat has a draft of 5.00 ft (1.52 m) with the standard keel and 4.00 ft (1.22 m) with the optional shoal draft keel. A tall mast was also an option with a main sail luff ("P" parameter) 1.5 ft (0.46 m) higher.

The boat has a hull speed of 6.46 kn (11.96 km/h).

== See also ==
- List of sailing boat types

Related development

- Cal 27
- Cal 2-27

Similar sailboats

- Aloha 27
- C&C 27
- Catalina 27
- Catalina 270
- Catalina 275 Sport
- CS 27
- Edel 820
- Express 27
- Fantasia 27
- Halman Horizon
- Hotfoot 27
- Hullmaster 27
- Hunter 27
- Hunter 27-2
- Hunter 27-3
- Island Packet 27
- Mirage 27 (Perry)
- Mirage 27 (Schmidt)
- Mirage 275
- O'Day 272
- Orion 27-2
- Tanzer 27
- Watkins 27
- Watkins 27P
