= O'Day 272 =

Sailboat class

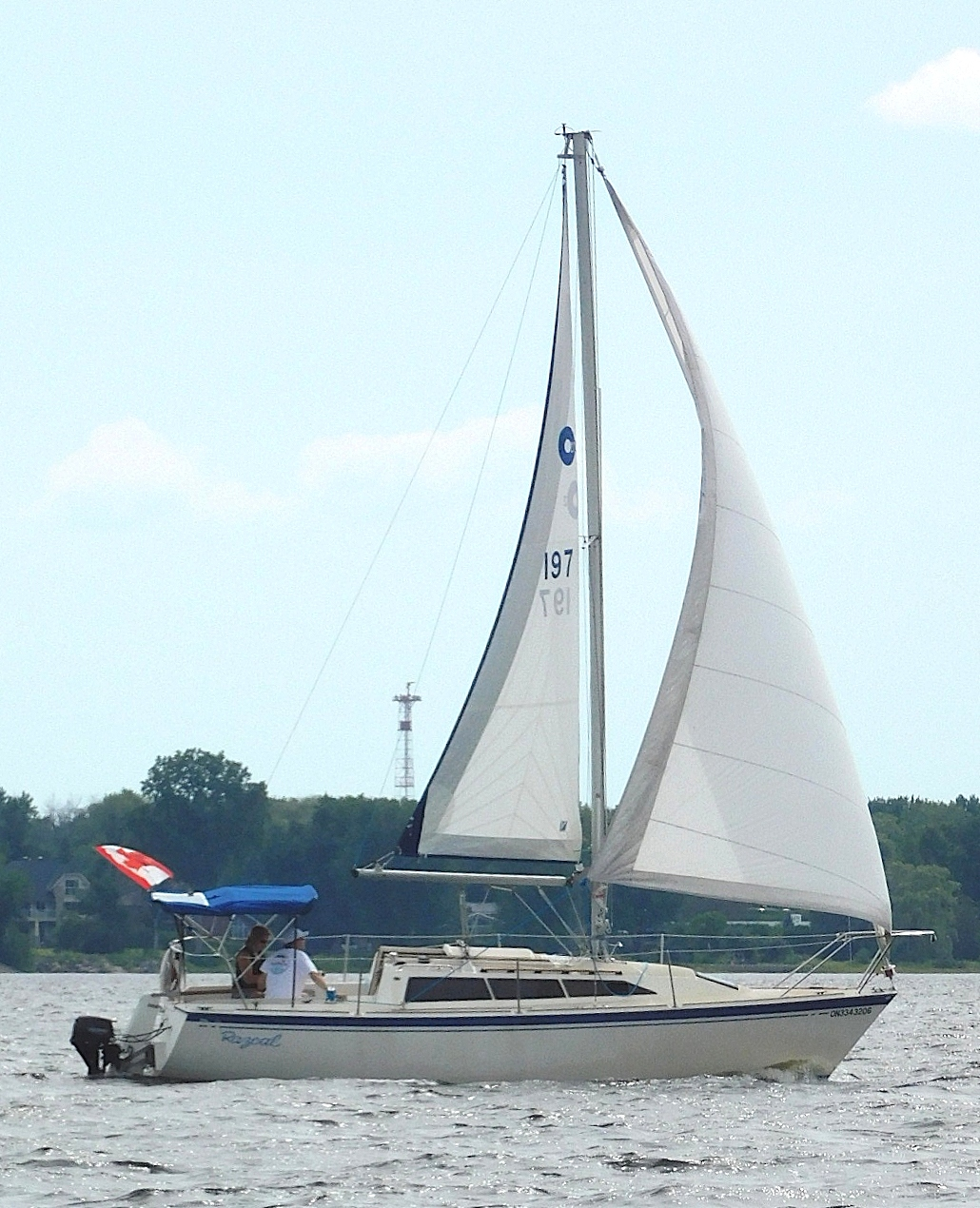

Development
- Designer: C. Raymond Hunt (C.R. Hunt & Associates)
- Location: United States
- Year: 1985
- Builder: O'Day Corp.
- Name: O'Day 272

Boat
- Displacement: 5,375 lb (2,438 kg)
- Draft: 2.92 ft (0.89 m)

Hull
- Type: Monohull
- Construction: Fiberglass
- LOA: 26.92 ft (8.21 m)
- LWL: 22.92 ft (6.99 m)
- Beam: 9.00 ft (2.74 m)
- Engine: Outboard motor

Hull appendages
- Keel: wing keel
- Ballast: 1,930 lb (875 kg)
- Rudder: transom-mounted rudder

Rig
- Rig type: Bermuda rig
- I foretriangle height: 30.83 ft (9.40 m)
- J foretriangle base: 10.50 ft (3.20 m)
- P mainsail luff: 26.08 ft (7.95 m)
- E mainsail foot: 10.50 ft (3.20 m)

Sails
- Sailplan: Masthead sloop
- Mainsail area: 136.92 sq ft (12.720 m^{2})
- Jib/genoa area: 161.86 sq ft (15.037 m^{2})
- Total sail area: 298.78 sq ft (27.758 m^{2})

The O'Day 272 is an American sailboat that was designed by C. Raymond Hunt of C.R. Hunt & Associates and first built in 1985.

== Production ==
The design was built by O'Day Corp., a division of Lear Siegler, in the United States from 1985 until 1989, but it is now out of production.

== Design ==
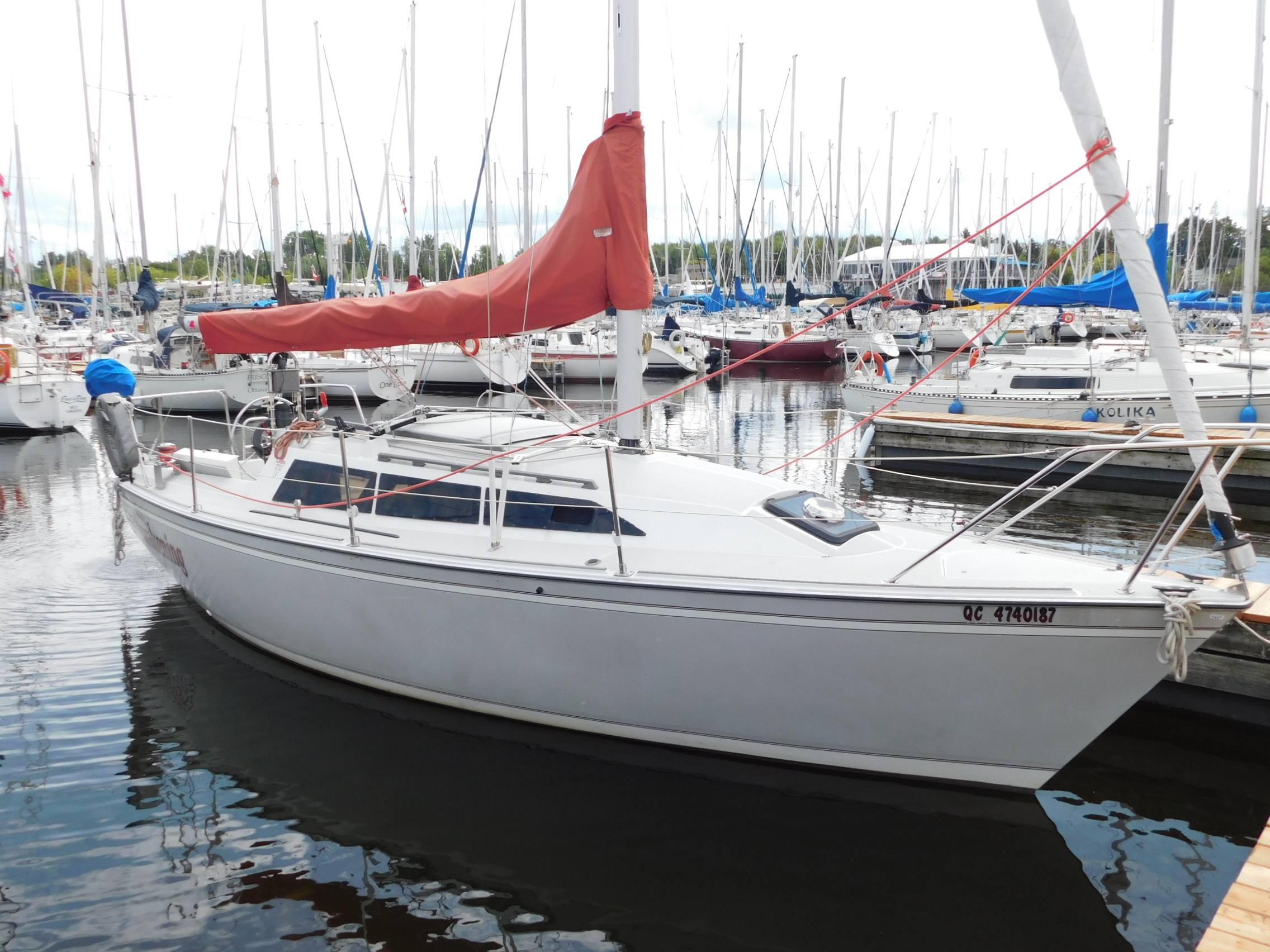
O'Day 272

The O'Day 272 is a recreational keelboat, built predominantly of fiberglass, with wood trim. It has a masthead sloop rig, a raked stem, a reverse transom, a transom-hung rudder controlled by a wheel or a tiller and an externally fastened fixed wing keel. It displaces 5,375 lb (2,438 kg) and carries 1,930 lb (875 kg) of ballast.

The boat has a draft of 2.92 ft (0.89 m) with the standard wing keel fitted. The boat is normally fitted with a small outboard motor for docking and maneuvering, although a gasoline or diesel inboard engine was a factory option. The fresh water tank has a capacity of 25 U.S. gallons (95 L; 21 imp gal).

The design has a hull speed of 6.42 kn (11.89 km/h).

== See also ==
- List of sailing boat types

Similar sailboats

- Aloha 27
- C&C 27
- Cal 27
- Cal 2-27
- Cal 3-27
- Catalina 27
- Catalina 270
- Catalina 275 Sport
- Crown 28
- CS 27
- Edel 820
- Express 27
- Fantasia 27
- Halman Horizon
- Hotfoot 27
- Hullmaster 27
- Hunter 27
- Hunter 27-2
- Hunter 27-3
- Irwin 27
- Island Packet 27
- Mirage 27 (Perry)
- Mirage 27 (Schmidt)
- Orion 27-2
- Tanzer 27
- Watkins 27
- Watkins 27P
