= Hunter 27-3 =

Sailboat class

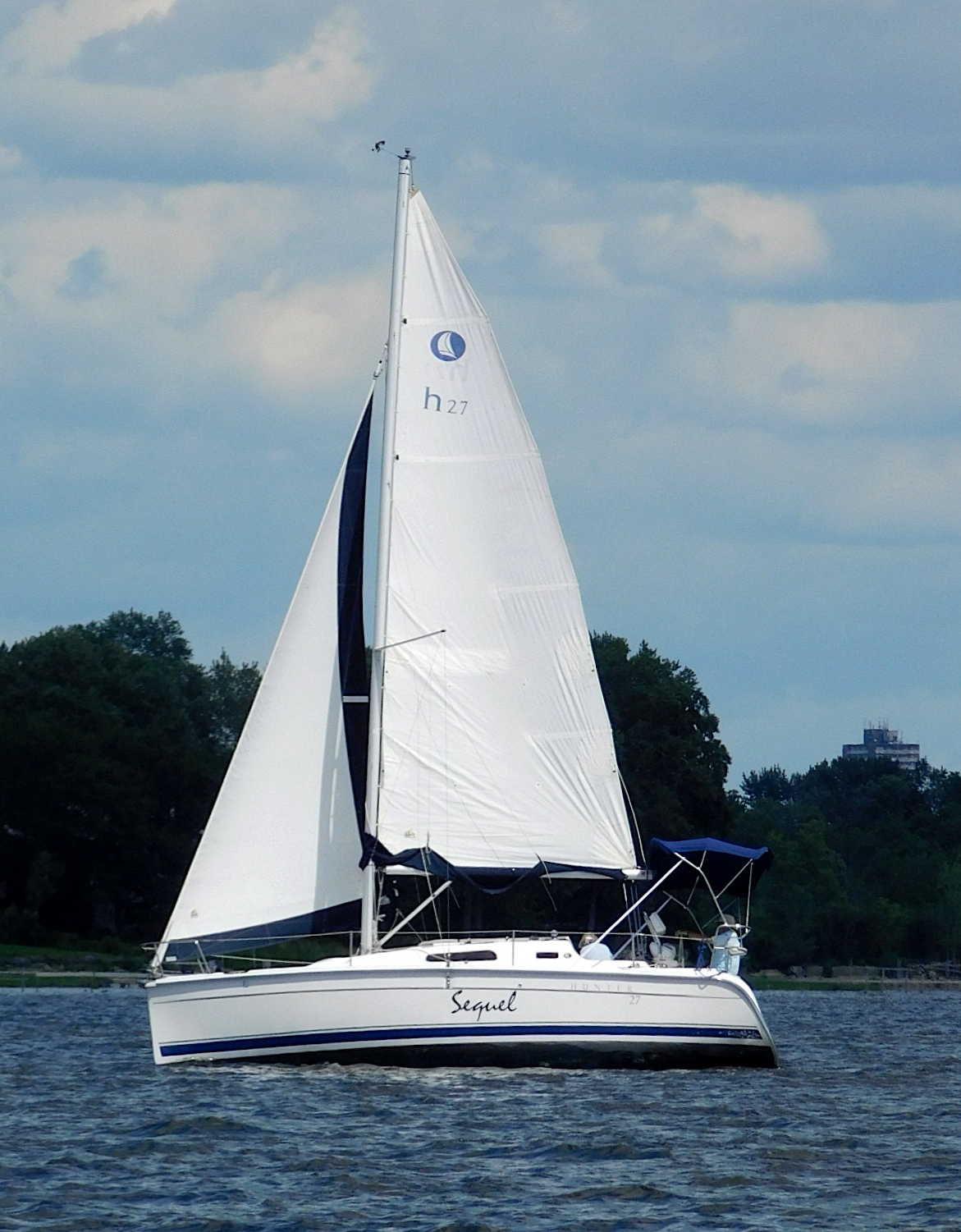

Development
- Designer: Glenn Henderson
- Location: United States
- Year: 2006
- Builder: Hunter Marine
- Name: Hunter 27-3

Boat
- Displacement: 7,663 lb (3,476 kg)
- Draft: 3.44 ft (1.05 m)

Hull
- Type: Monohull
- Construction: Fiberglass
- LOA: 27.33 ft (8.33 m)
- LWL: 23.56 ft (7.18 m)
- Beam: 9.91 ft (3.02 m)
- Engine: Yanmar 10 hp (7 kW) diesel engine

Hull appendages
- Keel: fin keel with bulb
- Ballast: 3,400 lb (1,542 kg)
- Rudder: internally-mounted spade-type rudder

Rig
- Rig type: B&R rig
- I foretriangle height: 27.00 ft (8.23 m)
- J foretriangle base: 8.92 ft (2.72 m)
- P mainsail luff: 30.33 ft (9.24 m)
- E mainsail foot: 11.67 ft (3.56 m)

Sails
- Sailplan: Fractional rigged sloop
- Mainsail area: 176.98 sq ft (16.442 m^{2})
- Jib/genoa area: 120.42 sq ft (11.187 m^{2})
- Total sail area: 297.40 sq ft (27.629 m^{2})

The Hunter 27-3 and Hunter 27X are a family of American sailboats that were both designed by Glenn Henderson and both first built in 2006.

The Hunter 27-3 was originally marketed by the manufacturer as the Hunter 27, but is now usually referred to as the 27-3 to differentiate it from the unrelated 1974 Hunter 27, 1989 Hunter 27-2 and later designs bearing the same name.

== Production ==
The designs were built by Hunter Marine in the United States, but are now out of production.

== Design ==
The Hunter 27-3 series are both small recreational keelboats, built predominantly of fiberglass. They have fractional sloop B&R rigs, plumb stems, reverse transoms, internally-mounted spade-type rudders controlled by wheels and fixed fin keels.

== Variants ==
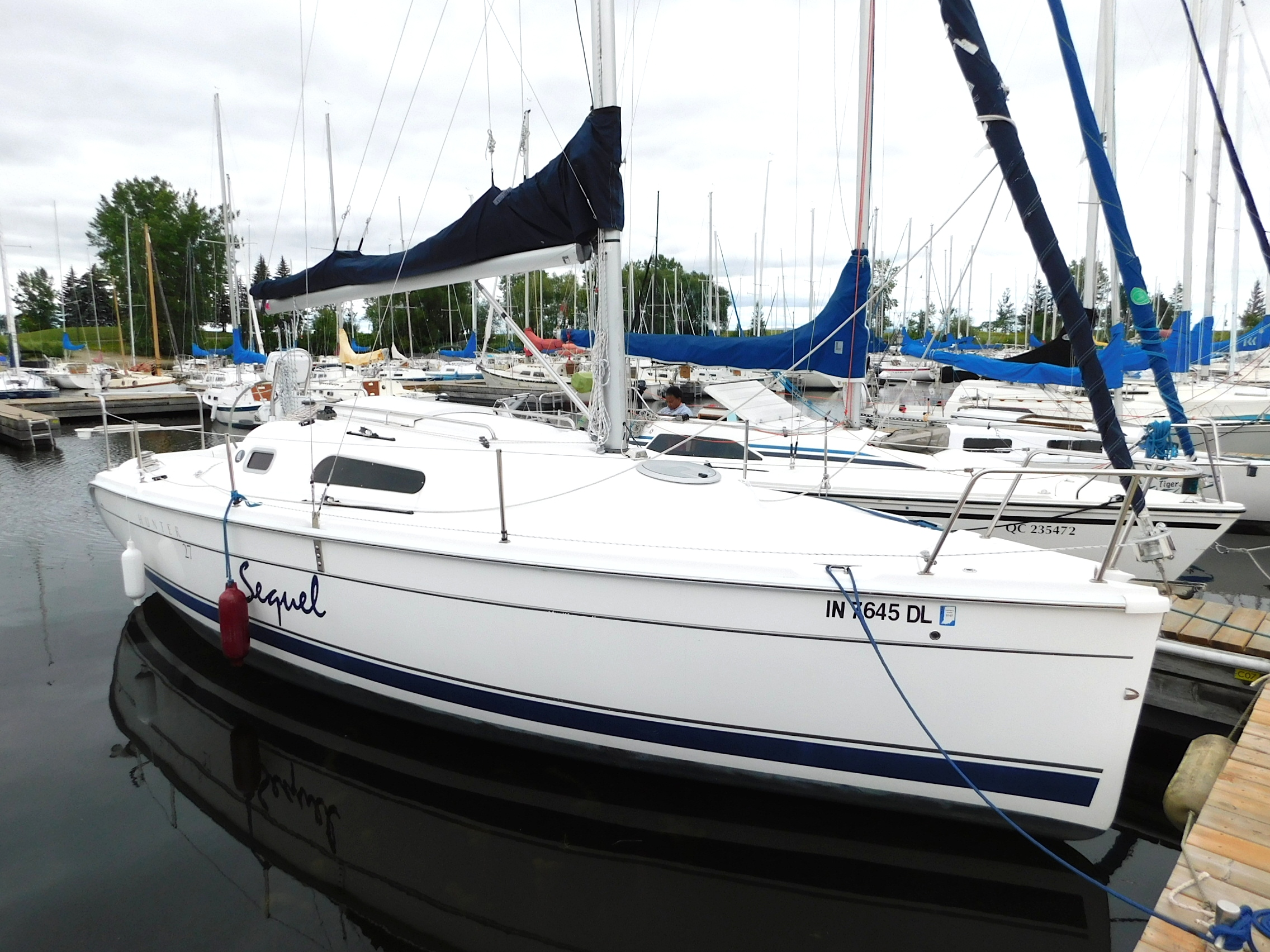
Hunter 27-3

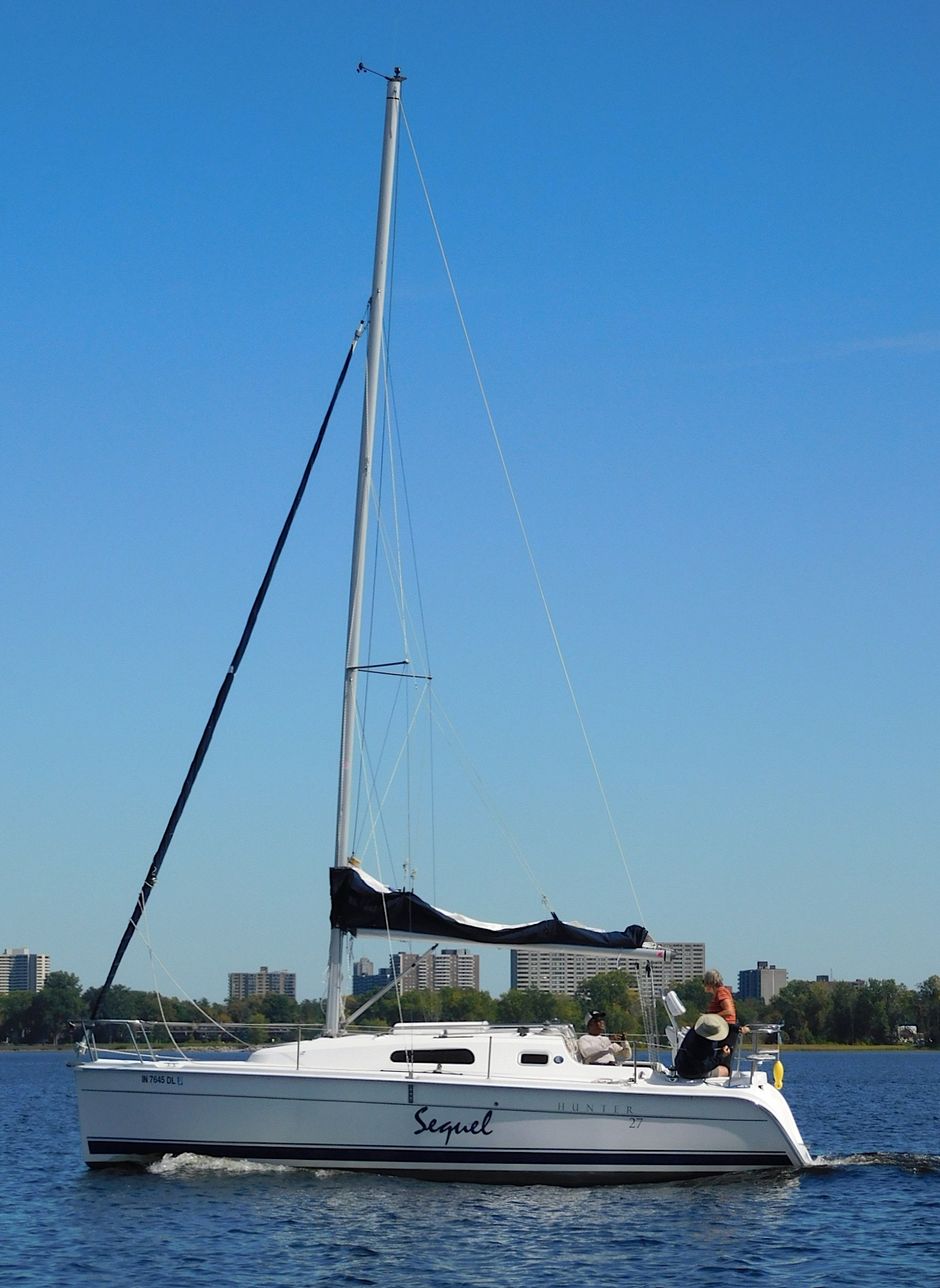
Hunter 27-3 motoring

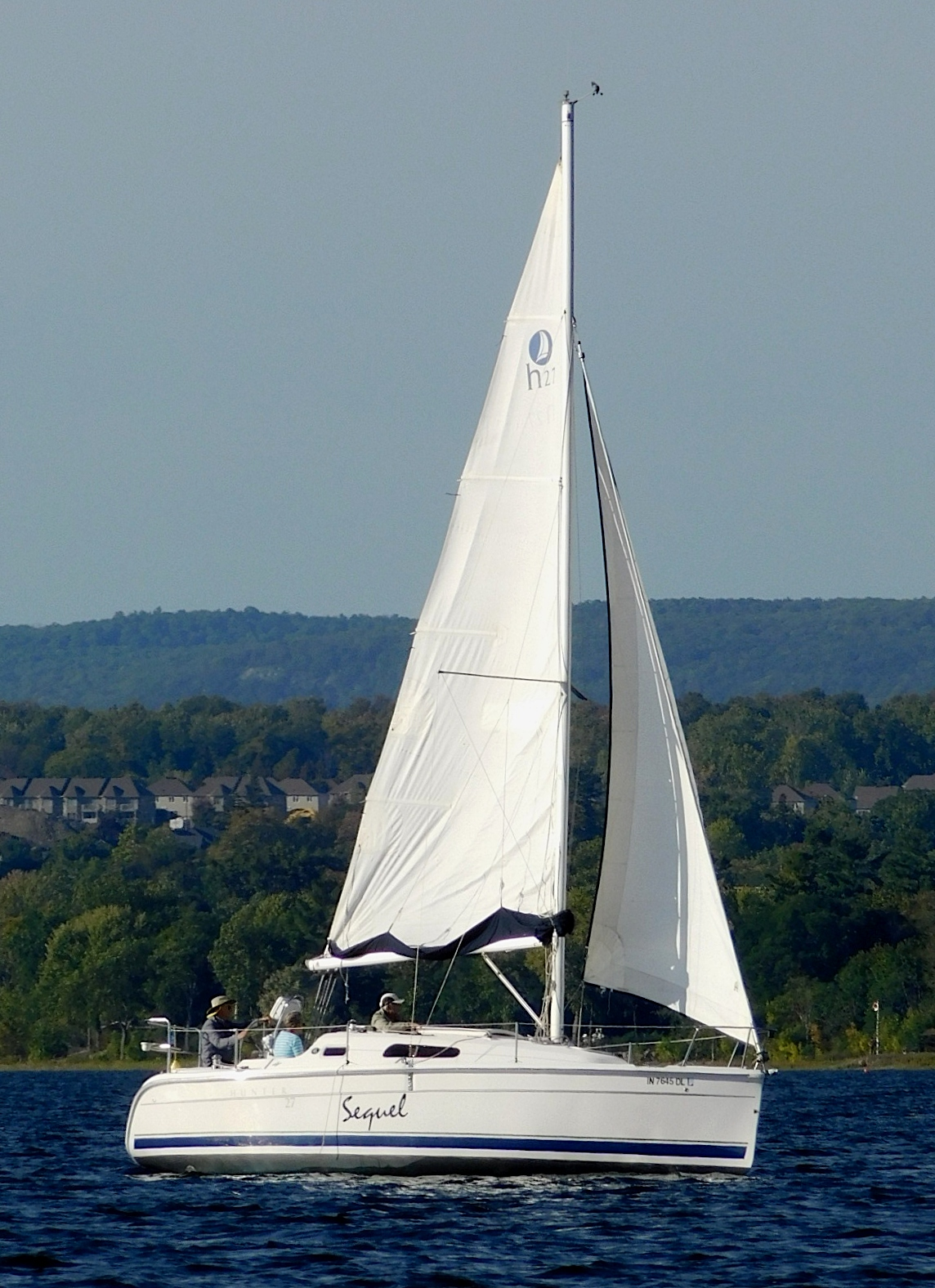
Hunter 27-3

Hunter 27-3
This model has a length overall of 27.33 ft (8.3 m), a waterline length of 23.56 ft (7.2 m), displaces 7,663 lb (3,476 kg) and carries 3,400 lb (1,542 kg) of ballast. The boat has a draft of 3.44 ft (1.05 m) with the standard fin and weight bulb keel and 5.00 ft (1.52 m) with the optional deep draft keel. The deep draft keel model displaces 7,505 lb (3,404 kg). A twin bilge keel model was also available for sale in the United Kingdom. The boat is fitted with a Japanese Yanmar diesel engine of 10 hp (7 kW). The fuel tank holds 15 U.S. gallons (57 L; 12 imp gal) and the fresh water tank has a capacity of 20 U.S. gallons (76 L; 17 imp gal). The design has a hull speed of 6.5 kn (12.04 km/h).
Hunter 27X
This model was designed as a racing version of the 27-3 using the same hull molds. It has a length overall of 27.33 ft (8.3 m), a waterline length of 23.56 ft (7.2 m), displaces 8,000 lb (3,629 kg) and carries 2,500 lb (1,134 kg) of ballast. The boat has a draft of 5.52 ft (1.68 m) with the standard long fin keel. The boat is fitted with a Japanese Yanmar 1gm10 diesel engine of 9 hp (7 kW) (14hp Yanmar 2ym15 optional) . The fuel tank holds 15 U.S. gallons (57 L; 12 imp gal) and the fresh water tank has a capacity of 20 U.S. gallons (76 L; 17 imp gal). The boat has a hull speed of 6.5 kn (12.04 km/h).

== See also ==
- List of sailing boat types

Related development

- Hunter 27
- Hunter 27-2
- Hunter 27 Edge

Similar sailboats

- Aloha 27
- C&C 27
- Cal 27
- Cal 2-27
- Cal 3-27
- Catalina 27
- Catalina 270
- Catalina 275 Sport
- Crown 28
- CS 27
- Edel 820
- Express 27
- Fantasia 27
- Halman Horizon
- Hotfoot 27
- Hullmaster 27
- Island Packet 27
- Mirage 27 (Perry)
- Mirage 27 (Schmidt)
- Mirage 275
- O'Day 272
- Orion 27-2
- Tanzer 27
- Watkins 27
