= Catalina 270 =

Sailboat class

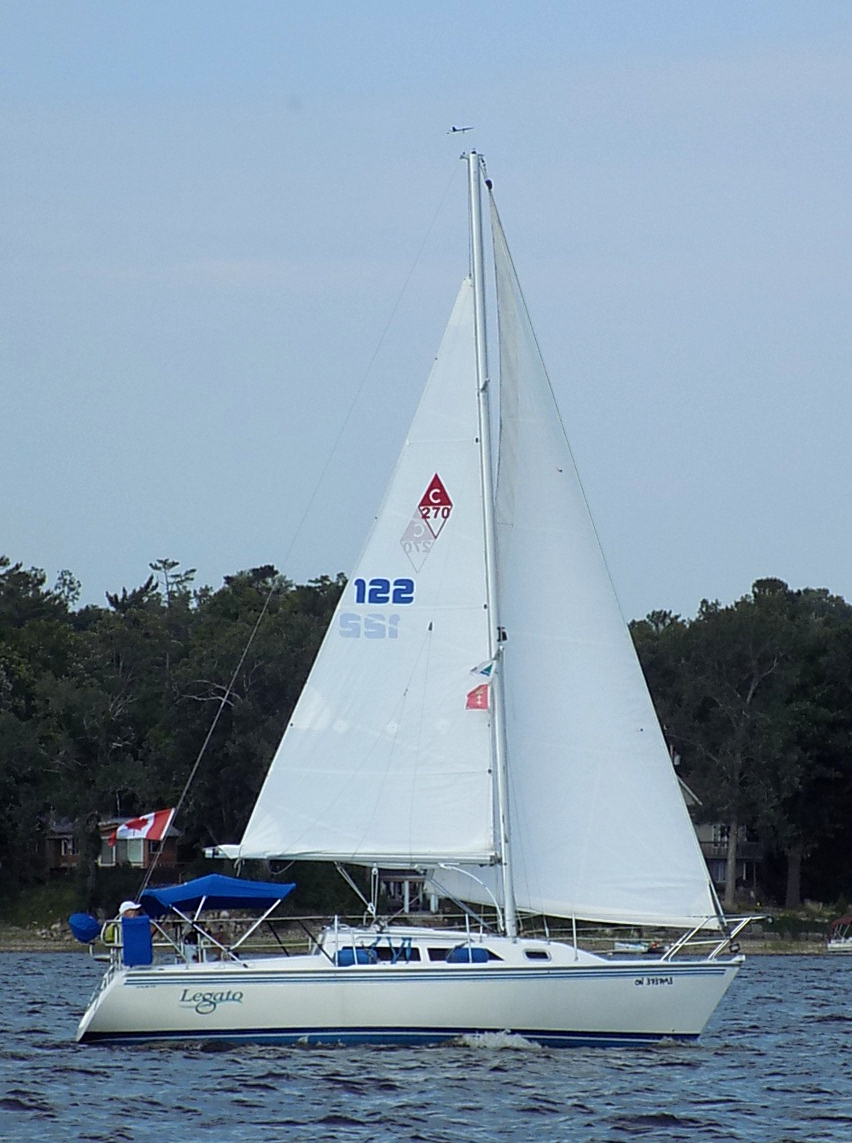

Development
- Designer: Gerry Douglas
- Location: United States
- Year: 1992
- Builder: Catalina Yachts
- Name: Catalina 270

Boat
- Displacement: 6,400 lb (2,903 kg)
- Draft: 5.00 ft (1.52 m)

Hull
- Type: Monohull
- Construction: Fiberglass
- LOA: 27.00 ft (8.23 m)
- LWL: 23.00 ft (7.01 m)
- Beam: 9.83 ft (3.00 m)
- Engine: Perkins Engines Model 20 diesel engine 18 hp (13 kW)

Hull appendages
- Keel: fin keel
- Ballast: 2,000 lb (907 kg)
- Rudder: internally-mounted spade-type rudder

Rig
- General: Masthead sloop
- I foretriangle height: 33.58 ft (10.24 m)
- J foretriangle base: 9.25 ft (2.82 m)
- P mainsail luff: 28.42 ft (8.66 m)
- E mainsail foot: 11.50 ft (3.51 m)

Sails
- Mainsail area: 163.42 sq ft (15.182 m^{2})
- Jib/genoa area: 155.31 sq ft (14.429 m^{2})
- Total sail area: 318.72 sq ft (29.610 m^{2})

Racing
- PHRF: 198 (average, SD model)

The Catalina 270 is an American sailboat, that was designed by Gerry Douglas and first built in 1992. The design is out of production.

== Production ==
The boat was built by Catalina Yachts in the United States and replaced the Catalina 27 in the company line.

== Design ==
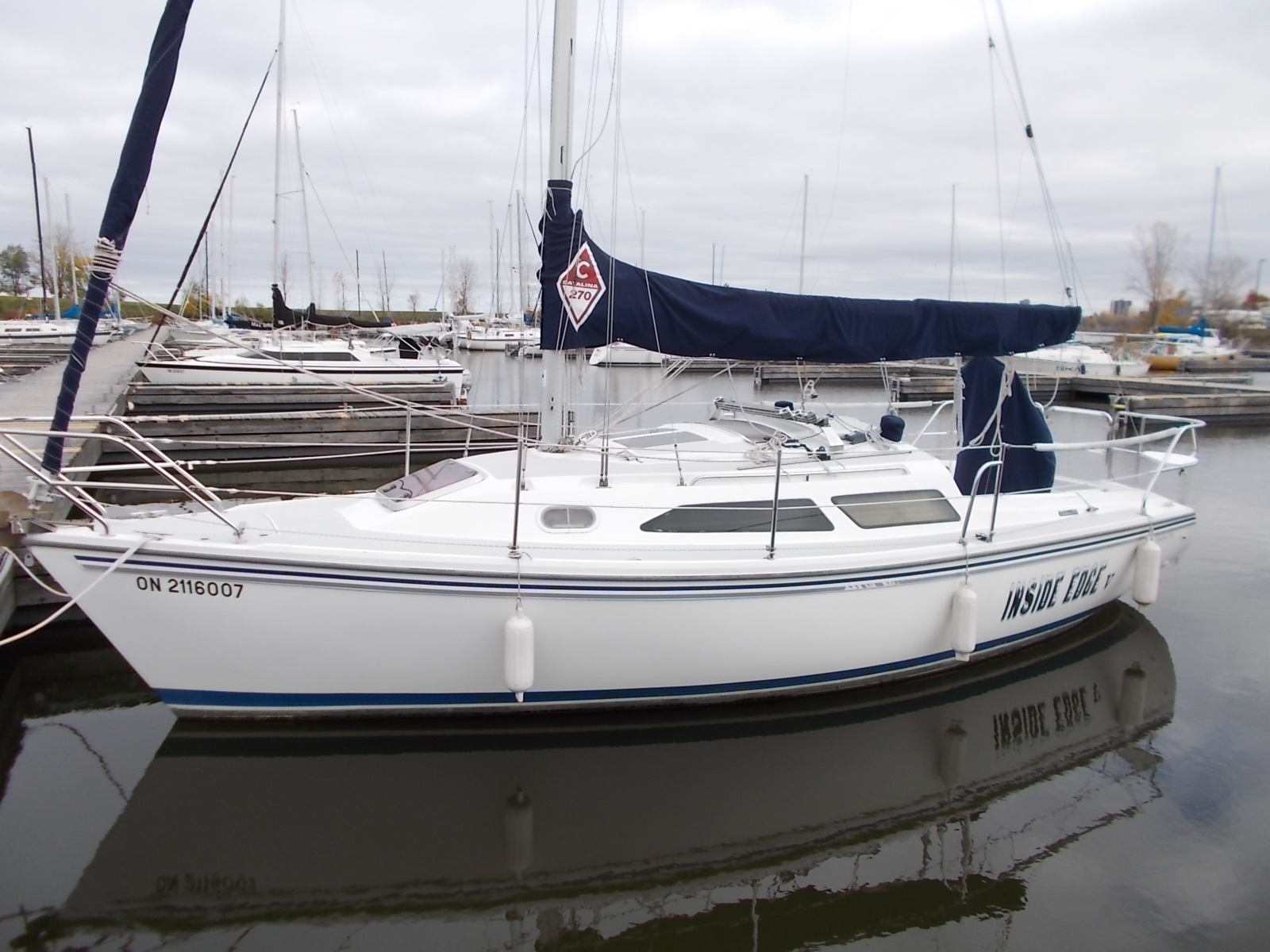
Catalina 270

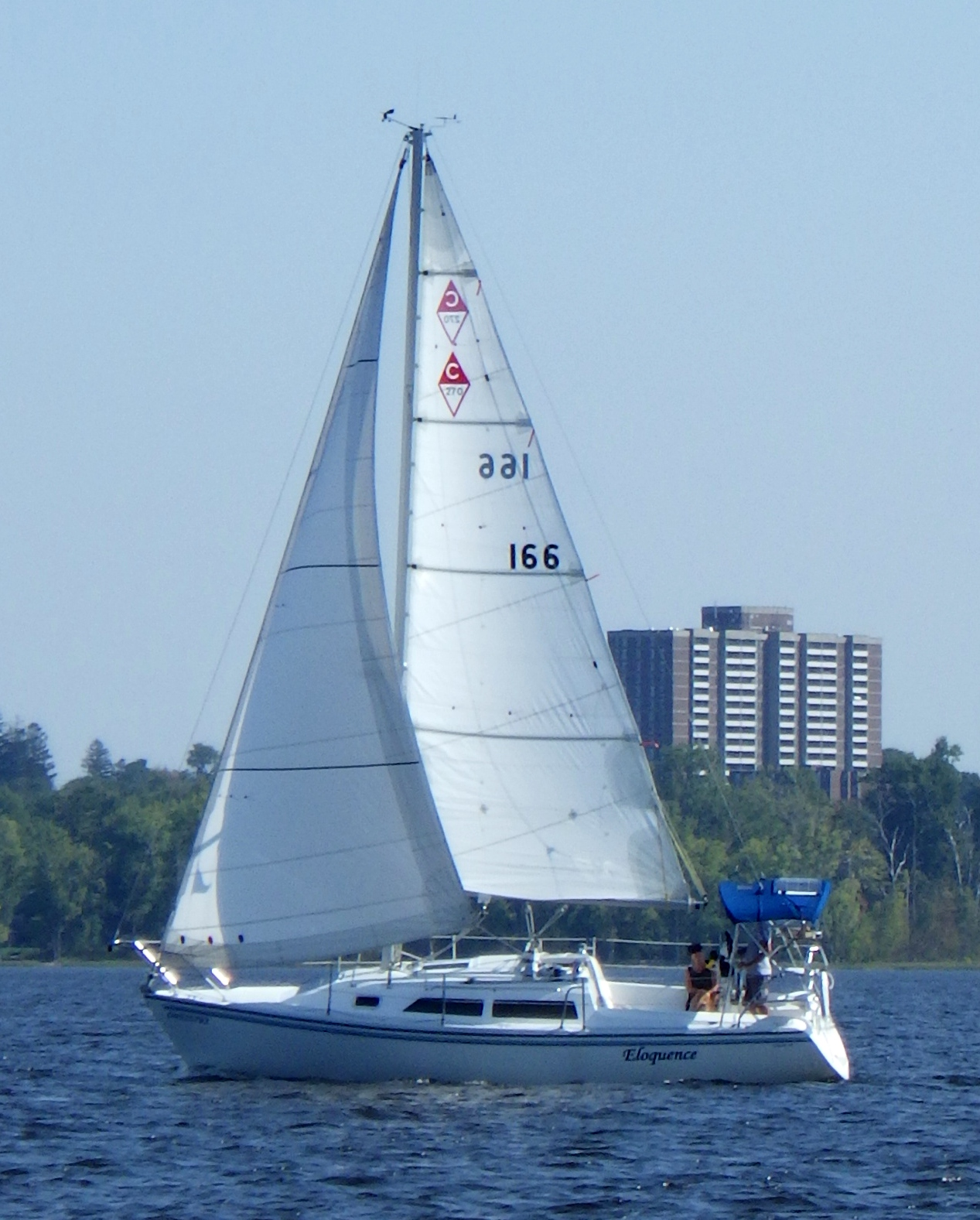
Catalina 270

The Catalina 270 is a small recreational keelboat, built predominantly of fiberglass. It has a masthead sloop rig, an internally-mounted spade-type rudder and a fixed fin keel. It displaces 6,400 lb (2,903 kg) and carries 2,000 lb (907 kg) of ballast.

The boat has a draft of 5.00 ft (1.52 m) with the standard keel and 3.5 ft (1.1 m) with the optional shoal draft wing keel.

The boat is fitted with a Perkins Engines Model 20 diesel engine of 18 hp (13 kW).

The boat has a hull speed of 6.43 kn (11.91 km/h).

== Variants ==
Catalina 270
Model with fin keel, giving draft of 5.00 ft (1.52 m).
Catalina 270 LE
Luxury Edition model.
Catalina 270 SD
Model with a shoal draft wing keel, giving a draft of 3.5 ft (1.1 m). The SD model has a PHRF racing average handicap of 198 with a high of 192 and low of 204. It has a hull speed of 6.43 kn (11.91 km/h).

== Operational history ==
The boat is supported by an active class club, the Catalina 27-270 Association.

== See also ==
- List of sailing boat types

Similar sailboats

- Aloha 27
- Cal 27
- Cal 2-27
- Cal 3-27
- C&C 27
- Catalina 275 Sport
- Crown 28
- CS 27
- Edel 820
- Express 27
- Fantasia 27
- Halman Horizon
- Hotfoot 27
- Hullmaster 27
- Hunter 27
- Hunter 27-2
- Hunter 27-3
- Mirage 27 (Perry)
- Mirage 27 (Schmidt)
- Mirage 275
- O'Day 272
- Orion 27-2
