= Island Packet 27 =

Sailboat class

Development
- Designer: Robert K. Johnson
- Location: United States
- Year: 1984
- No. built: 243
- Brand: Island Packet
- Builder: Island Packet Yachts
- Role: Cruiser
- Name: Island Packet 27

Boat
- Displacement: 8,000 lb (3,629 kg)
- Draft: 3.70 ft (1.13 m)
- Air draft: 38.5 m (126 ft)

Hull
- Type: Monohull
- Construction: Fiberglass
- Hull weight: 8,000 kg (18,000 lb)
- LOA: 30.0 ft (9.1 m)
- LOH: 26.5 ft (8.1 m)
- LWL: 24.25 ft (7.39 m)
- Beam: 10.50 ft (3.20 m)
- Engine: Yanmar 18 hp (13 kW) diesel engine

Hull appendages
- Keel: long keel
- Ballast: 3,000 lb (1,361 kg)
- Rudder: spade rudder

Rig
- Rig type: Cutter rig
- I foretriangle height: 35.00 ft (10.67 m)
- J foretriangle base: 12.00 ft (3.66 m)
- P mainsail luff: 30.00 ft (9.14 m)
- E mainsail foot: 13.00 ft (3.96 m)

Sails
- Sailplan: Cutter-rigged sloop
- Mainsail area: 195.00 sq ft (18.116 m^{2})
- Jib/genoa area: 210.00 sq ft (19.510 m^{2})
- Total sail area: 405.00 sq ft (37.626 m^{2})

The Island Packet 27 is an American sailboat that was designed by Robert K. Johnson as a cruiser and first built in 1984.

== Production ==
The design was built by Island Packet Yachts in the United States between 1984 and 1992. A total of 243 examples were completed, but it is now out of production.

== Design ==
The Island Packet 27 is a recreational keelboat, built predominantly of fiberglass, with teak wood trim and a teak and holly cabin sole. It is a Cutter-rigged sloop; with a spooned raked stem; a vertical transom; a spade rudder with wheel steering and a fixed long keel or optional long keel and centerboard. It displaces 8,000 lb (3,629 kg) and carries 3,000 lb (1,361 kg) of ballast.

The keel-equipped version of the boat has a draft of 3.70 ft (1.13 m), while the centerboard-equipped version has a draft of 6.0 ft (1.8 m) with the centerboard extended and 2.67 ft (0.81 m) with it retracted.

The boat is fitted with a Japanese Yanmar diesel engine of 18 hp (13 kW). The fuel tank holds 19 U.S. gallons (72 L; 16 imp gal) and the fresh water tank has a capacity of 31 U.S. gallons (120 L; 26 imp gal).

The mainsheet traveler is a curved track over the companionway, rigged for mid-boom sheeting. The cockpit features two jib sheet winches and one main sheet winch. The cockpit has room for six adults. There is a bowsprit with an anchor roller.

The galley is located on the port side of the boat and includes a two-burner alcohol-fired stove, an icebox and a sink with optional pressure water supply. The head is located just aft of the "V"-berth, on the starboard side. Sleeping accommodations consist of the "V"-berth forward, a cabin settee which converts to a double berth and a single pilot berth to starboard. The cabin table folds up against the bulkhead.

Cabin ventilation consists of nine opening ports and 2 hatches.

== Operational history ==
In a review, Richard Sherwood wrote of the design, "The keel model is standard, the centerboard version available at additional cost. The Packet is a cruiser, not intended for racing. The broad beam gives an unusually spacious interior."

== See also ==
- List of sailing boat types

Similar sailboats

- Aloha 27
- C&C 27
- Cal 27
- Cal 2-27
- Cal 3-27
- Catalina 27
- Crown 28
- CS 27
- Express 27
- Fantasia 27
- Halman Horizon
- Hotfoot 27
- Hullmaster 27
- Hunter 27
- Hunter 27-2
- Hunter 27-3
- Irwin 27
- Mirage 27 (Perry)
- Mirage 27 (Schmidt)
- O'Day 272
- Orion 27-2
- Tanzer 27
- Watkins 27
- Watkins 27P
