= Cal 27 =

Sailboat class

Development
- Designer: William Lapworth
- Location: United States
- Year: 1971
- No. built: 306
- Builder: Jensen Marine
- Name: Cal 27

Boat
- Displacement: 5,400 lb (2,449 kg)
- Draft: 4.50 ft (1.37 m)

Hull
- Type: Monohull
- Construction: Fiberglass
- LOA: 27.34 ft (8.33 m)
- LWL: 22.33 ft (6.81 m)
- Beam: 9.00 ft (2.74 m)

Hull appendages
- Keel: fin keel
- Ballast: 2,725 lb (1,236 kg)
- Rudder: internally-mounted spade-type rudder

Rig
- General: Masthead sloop
- I foretriangle height: 34.50 ft (10.52 m)
- J foretriangle base: 12.00 ft (3.66 m)
- P mainsail luff: 27.75 ft (8.46 m)
- E mainsail foot: 10.25 ft (3.12 m)

Sails
- Mainsail area: 142.22 sq ft (13.213 m^{2})
- Jib/genoa area: 207.00 sq ft (19.231 m^{2})
- Total sail area: 349.22 sq ft (32.444 m^{2})

Racing
- PHRF: 210 (average)

The Cal 27 is an American sailboat, that was designed by William Lapworth and first built in 1971.

== Production ==
The boat was built by Jensen Marine in the United States, who completed 306 examples between 1971 and 1974. It is now out of production.

The Cal 27 design was replaced in the company line by the Cal 2-27 in 1974.

== Design ==
The Cal 27 is a small recreational keelboat, built predominantly of fiberglass, with wood trim. It has a masthead sloop rig, an internally-mounted spade-type rudder and a fixed fin keel. It displaces 5,400 lb (2,449 kg) and carries 2,725 lb (1,236 kg) of ballast.

The boat has a draft of 4.50 ft (1.37 m) with the standard keel.

The boat has a PHRF racing average handicap of 210 with a high of 210 and low of 210. It has a hull speed of 6.33 kn (11.72 km/h).

A version was also built with a 3 ft (0.91 m) taller mast.

== See also ==
- List of sailing boat types

Related development

- Cal 2-27
- Cal 3-27

Similar sailboats

- Aloha 27
- C&C 27
- Catalina 27
- Catalina 270
- Catalina 275 Sport
- CS 27
- Edel 820
- Express 27
- Fantasia 27
- Halman Horizon
- Hotfoot 27
- Hullmaster 27
- Hunter 27
- Hunter 27-2
- Hunter 27-3
- Island Packet 27
- Mirage 27 (Perry)
- Mirage 27 (Schmidt)
- Mirage 275
- O'Day 272
- Orion 27-2
- Watkins 27
- Watkins 27P
