= Mirage 27 (Schmidt) =

Sailboat class

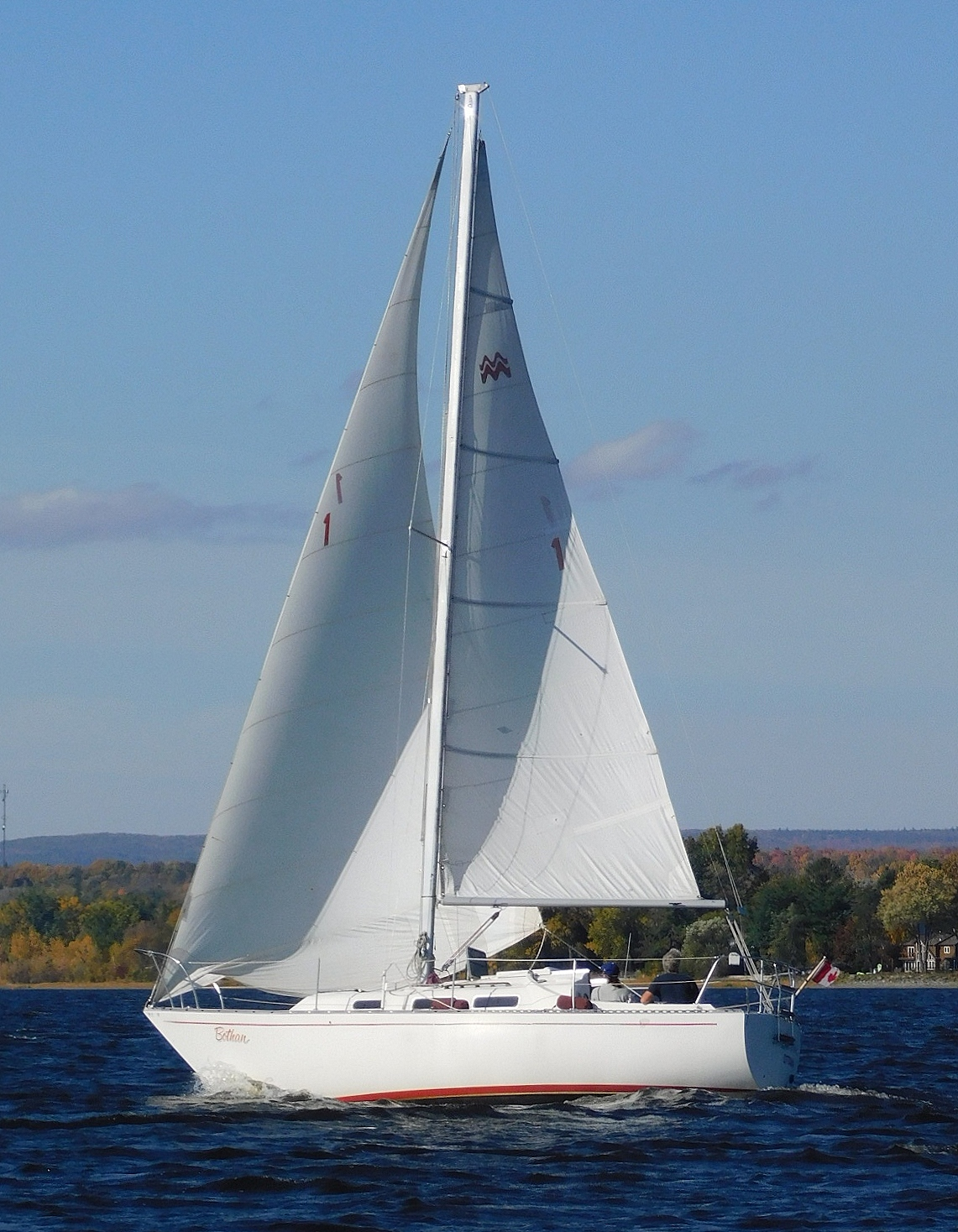

Development
- Designer: Peter Schmitt
- Location: Canada
- Year: 1975
- Builder: Mirage Yachts
- Name: Mirage 27

Boat
- Displacement: 5,500 lb (2,495 kg)
- Draft: 4.17 ft (1.27 m)

Hull
- Type: Monohull
- Construction: Fibreglass
- LOA: 27.17 ft (8.28 m)
- LWL: 21.50 ft (6.55 m)
- Beam: 9.25 ft (2.82 m)
- Engine: Yanmar 1GM diesel engine, 9 hp (7 kW)

Hull appendages
- Keel: fin keel
- Ballast: 2,200 lb (998 kg)
- Rudder: internally-mounted spade-type rudder

Rig
- General: Masthead sloop
- I foretriangle height: 35.80 ft (10.91 m)
- J foretriangle base: 11.80 ft (3.60 m)
- P mainsail luff: 29.90 ft (9.11 m)
- E mainsail foot: 10.60 ft (3.23 m)

Sails
- Mainsail area: 158.47 sq ft (14.722 m^{2})
- Jib/genoa area: 211.22 sq ft (19.623 m^{2})
- Total sail area: 369.69 sq ft (34.345 m^{2})

The Mirage 27 (Schmidt) is a Canadian sailboat, that was designed by Peter Schmitt and first built in 1975. The design is out of production.

== Production ==
The boat was built by Mirage Yachts in Canada starting in 1975. It is not related to the later Mirage 27 designed by Robert Perry, another design built by Mirage under the same name.

== Design ==
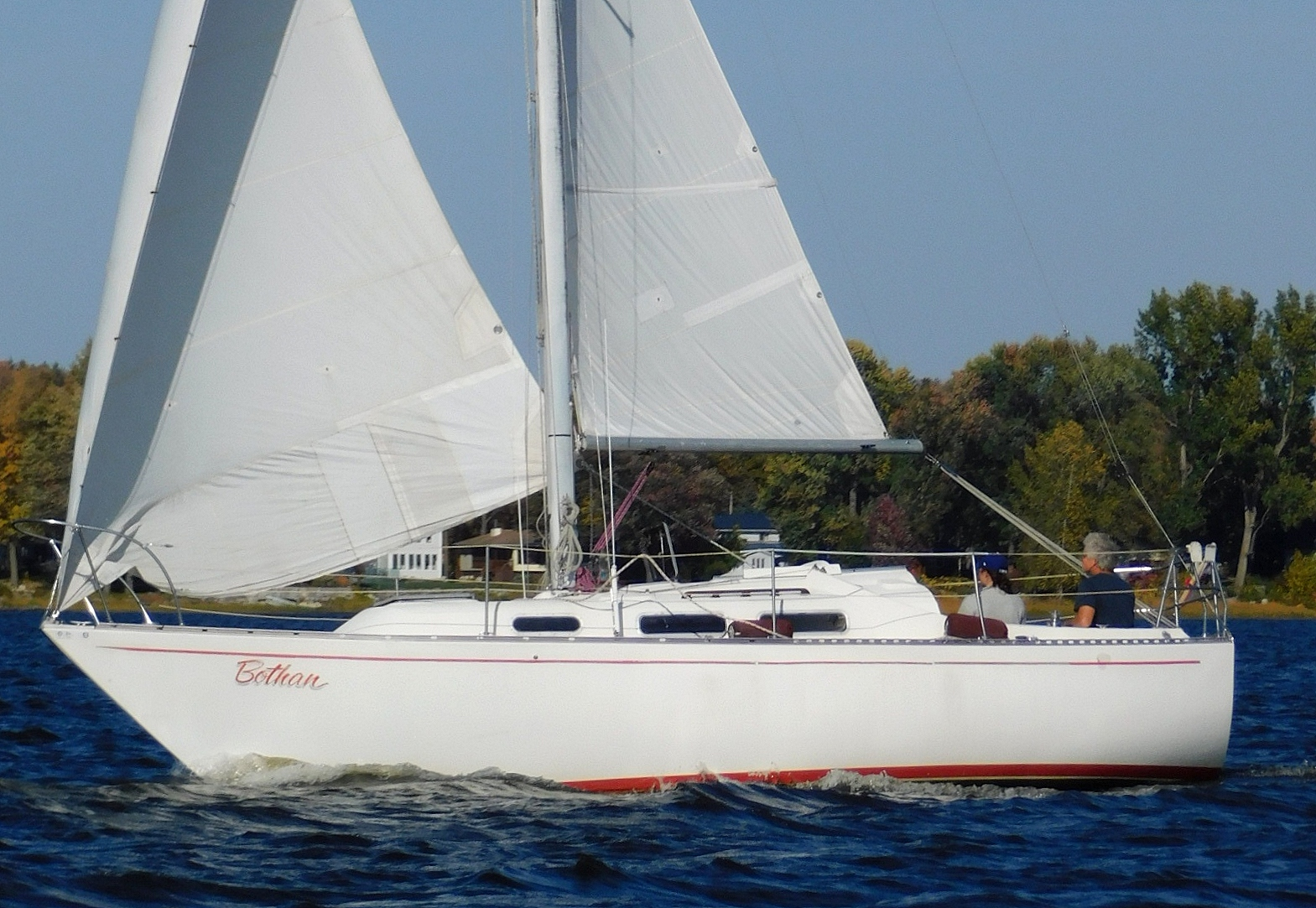
Mirage 27 (Schmidt)

The Mirage 27 is a small recreational keelboat, built predominantly of fibreglass. It has a masthead sloop rig, an internally-mounted, spade-type rudder and a fixed fin keel.

It has a length overall of 27.17 ft (8.3 m), a waterline length of 21.50 ft (6.6 m), displaces 5,500 lb (2,495 kg) and carries 2,200 lb (998 kg) of ballast. The boat has a draft of 4.17 ft (1.27 m) with the standard keel. The boat is fitted with a Japanese Yanmar 1GM diesel engine of 9 hp (7 kW). The fuel tank holds 12 U.S. gallons (45 L; 10.0 imp gal) and the fresh water tank has a capacity of 10 U.S. gallons (38 L; 8.3 imp gal). The boat has a hull speed of 6.21 kn (11.50 km/h).

== See also ==
- List of sailing boat types

Similar sailboats

- Aloha 27
- Cal 27
- Cal 2-27
- Cal 3-27
- Catalina 27
- Catalina 270
- Catalina 275 Sport
- C&C 27
- Crown 28
- CS 27
- Edel 820
- Express 27
- Fantasia 27
- Halman Horizon
- Hotfoot 27
- Hullmaster 27
- Hunter 27
- Hunter 27-2
- Hunter 27-3
- Irwin 27
- Island Packet 27
- Mirage 27 (Perry)
- Mirage 275
- O'Day 272
- Orion 27-2
- Watkins 27
- Watkins 27P
