= Watkins 27P =

Sailboat class

Development
- Designer: Walter Scott
- Location: United States
- Year: 1981
- No. built: 7
- Builder: Watkins Yachts
- Name: Watkins 27P

Boat
- Displacement: 7,500 lb (3,402 kg)
- Draft: 3.67 ft (1.12 m)

Hull
- Type: Monohull
- Construction: Fiberglass
- LOA: 27.00 ft (8.23 m)
- LWL: 23.25 ft (7.09 m)
- Beam: 10.00 ft (3.05 m)
- Engine: Yanmar 15 hp (11 kW) diesel engine

Hull appendages
- Keel: shoal-draft fin keel
- Ballast: 3,500 lb (1,588 kg)
- Rudder: skeg-mounted rudder

Rig
- Rig type: Bermuda rig

Sails
- Sailplan: Masthead sloop
- Total sail area: 292 sq ft (27.1 m^{2})

The Watkins 27P, also known as the W27P, is an American sailboat that was designed by naval architect Walter Scott and first built in 1981.

The Watkins 27P design was developed from the commercially successful Watkins 27, by adding a pilothouse and making changes to the mast height and sail area.

== Production ==
The design was built by Watkins Yachts in Clearwater, Florida, United States. A total of seven examples were completed, with all constructed in 1981.

== Development ==
The boat was initiated as "one-off" custom design for a customer, using the Watkins 27 hull and deck as a basis. Once completed, the company decided to put the design into production to compete with Morgan Yachts and Pearson Yachts, which were also producing pilothouse yachts at that time.

The prototype was used to create a mould for the pilothouse, the mast was then shortened, the boom raised to clear the pilothouse and the sailplan was adjusted accordingly.

== Design ==
The Watkins 27P is a recreational keelboat, built predominantly of polyester resin-based fiberglass, with teak wood trim. Plywood coring is used in the structures of the cabin roof, the deck, seats and cockpit sole for additional stiffness. It has a masthead sloop rig with 6061-T6 aluminum spars, a raked stem, a vertical transom, a skeg-mounted rudder controlled by a wheel and a shoal-draft keel. It displaces 7,500 lb (3,402 kg) and carries 3,500 lb (1,588 kg) of ballast.

The boat has a draft of 3.67 ft (1.12 m) with the standard shoal-draft keel fitted.

The boat is fitted with a Japanese Yanmar 15 hp (11 kW) diesel engine. The fuel tank holds 20 U.S. gallons (76 L; 17 imp gal) and the fresh water tank has a capacity of 40 U.S. gallons (150 L; 33 imp gal).

Sleeping accommodation is provided for five people and consists of a bow "V" berth, a main cabin settee berth and a double-sized quarter berth. The head is fully enclosed and located to port aft of the forward cabin. The galley is aft, on the starboard side and includes an icebox and a two-burner alcohol or gas-fired stove mounted on gimbals. Ventilation is provided by six opening ports. The main cabin has 74 in (188 cm) of standing headroom. All woodwork is teak, including the cabin accents, bulkheads and the cabinets, which are teak veneer over plywood. The cabin sole is a teak parquet design.

The design has a hull speed of 6.46 kn (11.96 km/h).

== Operational history ==
The boat is supported by an active class club, the Watkins Owners.

By 2008 it was reported that four 27Ps were still in existence.

== See also ==
- List of sailing boat types

Related development

- Watkins 27

Similar sailboats

- Aloha 27
- Cal 27
- Cal 2-27
- Cal 3-27
- Catalina 27
- C&C 27
- Crown 28
- CS 27
- Edel 820
- Express 27
- Fantasia 27
- Halman Horizon
- Hotfoot 27
- Hullmaster 27
- Hunter 27
- Hunter 27-2
- Irwin 27
- Island Packet 27
- Mirage 27 (Perry)
- Mirage 27 (Schmidt)
- Mirage 275
- O'Day 272
- Orion 27-2
