= Catalina 275 Sport =

Sailboat class

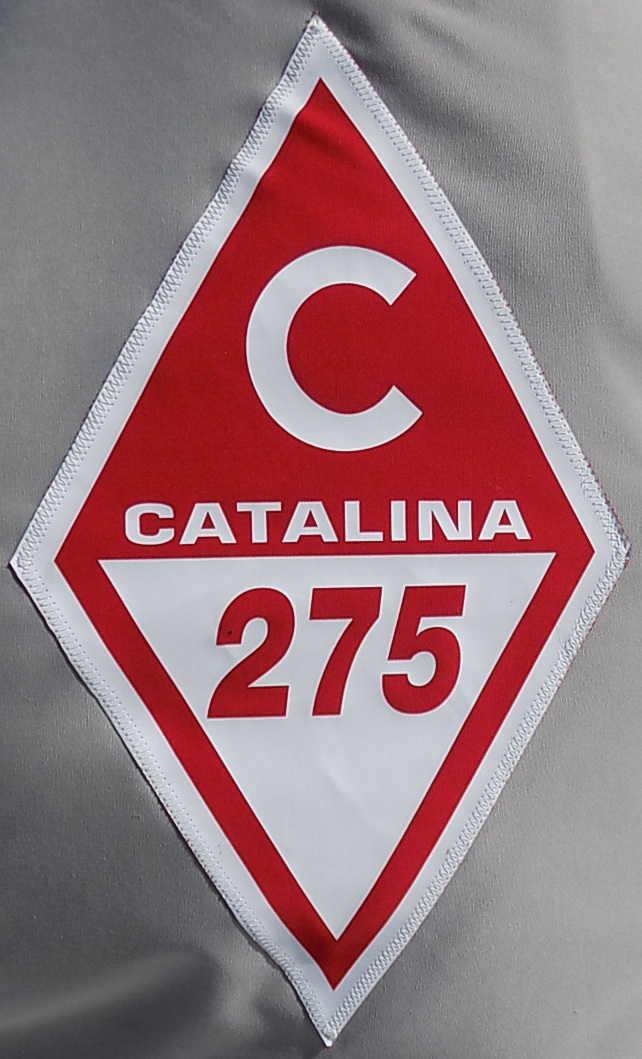
- Class symbol

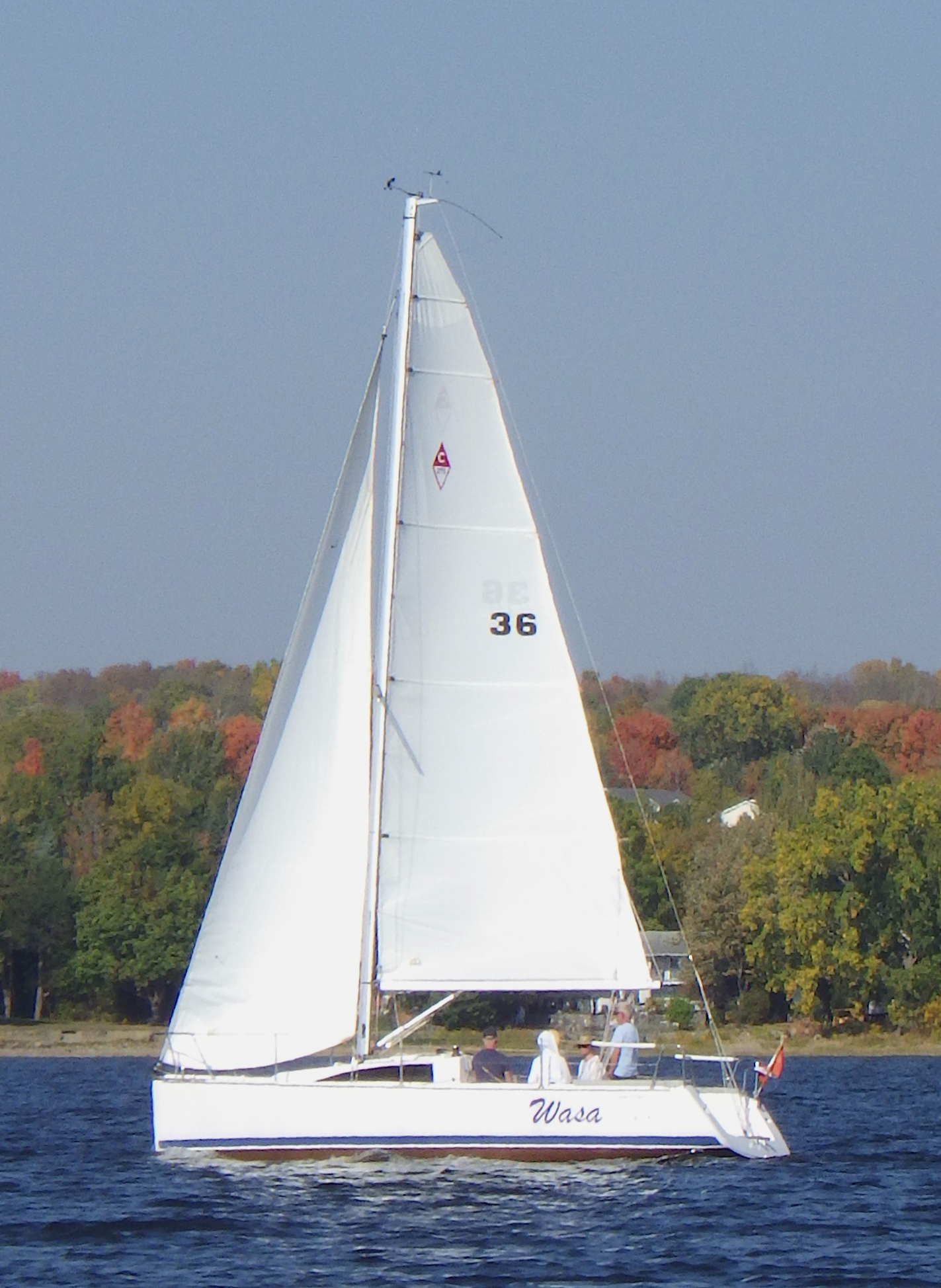

Development
- Designer: Gerry Douglas
- Location: United States
- Year: 2013
- Builder: Catalina Yachts
- Name: Catalina 275 Sport

Boat
- Displacement: 5,000 lb (2,268 kg)
- Draft: 5.22 ft (1.59 m)

Hull
- Type: Monohull
- Construction: Fiberglass
- LOA: 27.49 ft (8.38 m)
- LWL: 26.57 ft (8.10 m)
- Beam: 8.50 ft (2.59 m)
- Engine: Yanmar 2Y1M5 of 14.6 hp (11 kW) diesel engine

Hull appendages
- Keel: fin keel
- Ballast: 2,040 lb (925 kg)
- Rudder: internally-mounted spade-type rudder

Rig
- Rig type: Bermuda rig
- I foretriangle height: 34.42 ft (10.49 m)
- J foretriangle base: 8.99 ft (2.74 m)
- P mainsail luff: 31.50 ft (9.60 m)
- E mainsail foot: 11.48 ft (3.50 m)

Sails
- Sailplan: Fractional rigged sloop
- Mainsail area: 180.81 sq ft (16.798 m^{2})
- Jib/genoa area: 154.72 sq ft (14.374 m^{2})
- Total sail area: 335.53 sq ft (31.172 m^{2})

The Catalina 275 Sport is an American sailboat, that was designed by Gerry Douglas primarily for racing and day sailing.

== Production ==
The boat is built by Catalina Yachts in the United States, with production starting in 2013. It remained in production in 2018.

== Design ==
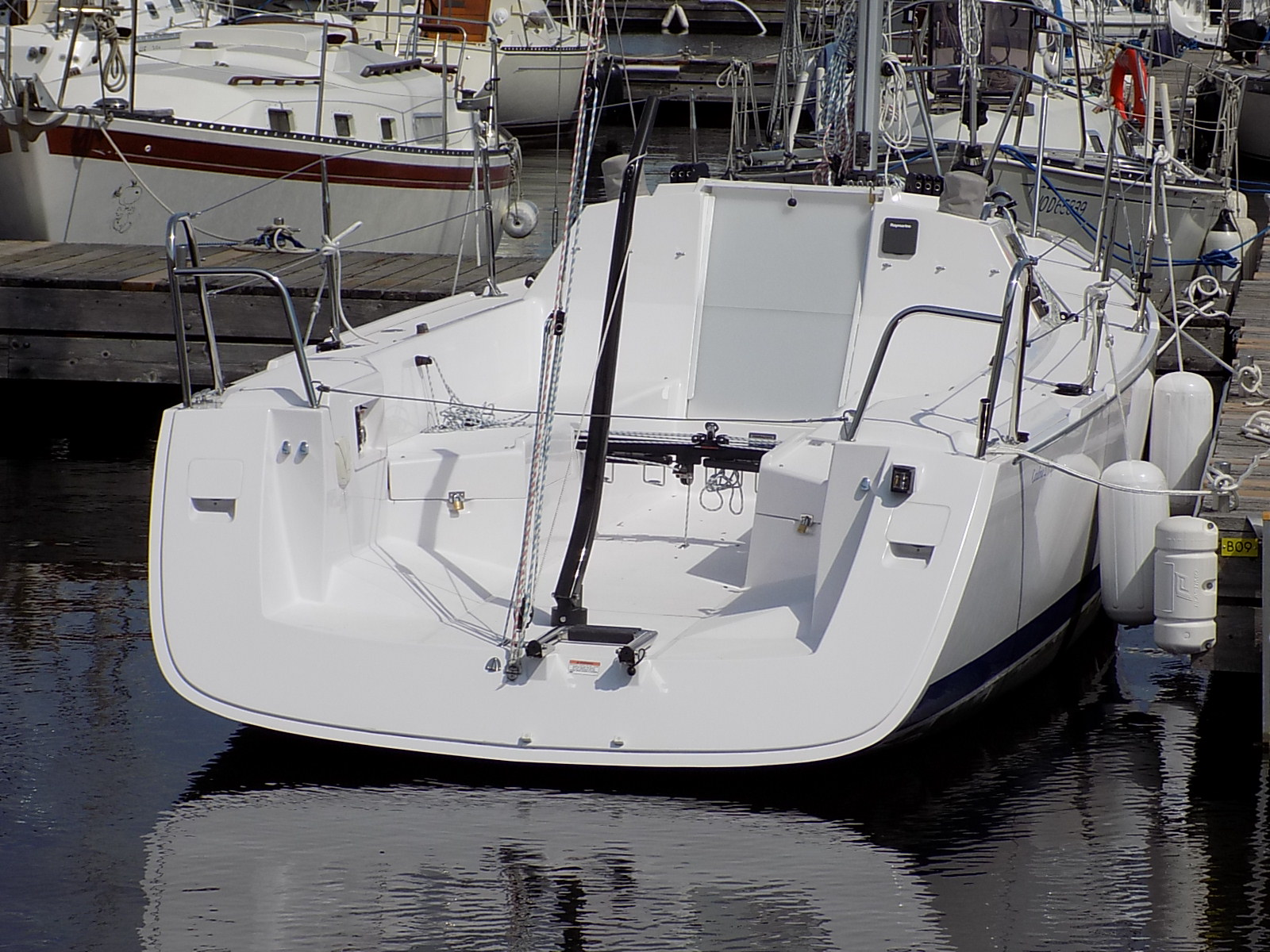
Catalina 275 Sport showing its open transom

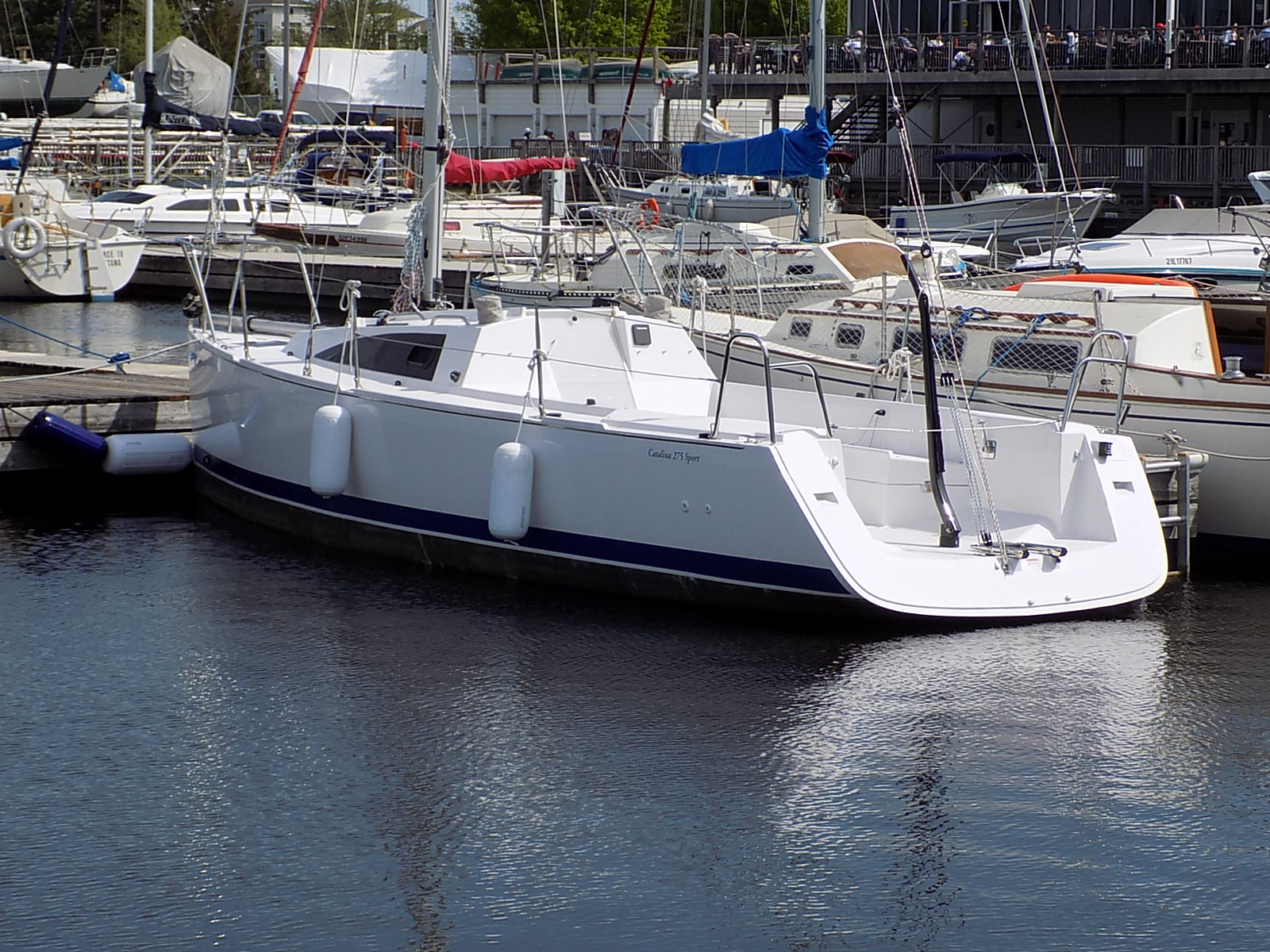
Catalina 275 Sport

The Catalina 275 Sport is a small recreational keelboat, built predominantly of fiberglass. It has a fractional sloop rig, a plumb stem, an open reverse transom, an internally-mounted spade-type rudder and a fixed fin keel or optional wing keel. It is equipped with a carbon fiber reinforced polymer tiller and basic accommodations for sleeping, including a galley and an enclosed head. A retractable bowsprit is optional.

The boat displaces 5,000 lb (2,268 kg) and carries 2,040 lb (925 kg) of lead ballast with the standard keel and 2,200 lb (998 kg) with the wing keel.

The boat has a draft of 5.22 ft (1.59 m) with the standard keel fitted and 3.66 ft (1.12 m) with the optional shoal draft wing keel.

The boat is fitted with a Yanmar 2Y1M5 14.6 hp (11 kW) diesel inboard engine, powering a saildrive two-bladed propeller.

The design has a hull speed of 6.91 kn (12.80 km/h).

== See also ==
- List of sailing boat types

Similar sailboats

- Aloha 27
- Archambault A27
- C&C 27
- C&C SR 27
- Cal 27
- Cal 2-27
- Cal 3-27
- Catalina 27
- Catalina 270
- Crown 28
- CS 27
- Express 27
- Fantasia 27
- Hotfoot 27
- Hullmaster 27
- Hunter 27
- Hunter 27-2
- Hunter 27-3
- Mirage 27 (Perry)
- Mirage 27 (Schmidt)
- O'Day 272
- Orion 27-2
- Tanzer 27
