= Tanzer 27 =

1980s Canadian recreational keelboat

Development
- Designer: C. Raymond Hunt
- Location: Canada
- Year: 1982
- Builder: Tanzer Industries
- Name: Tanzer 27

Boat
- Crew: Two
- Draft: 4.50 ft (1.37 m) with standard keel, 3.25 ft (0.99 m) with shoal-draft keel

Hull
- Type: Masthead sloop
- Construction: Fibreglass
- LOA: 26.58 ft (8.10 m)
- LWL: 22.50 ft (6.86 m)
- Beam: 9.50 ft (2.90 m)

Hull appendages
- Keel: fixed fin keel or shoal-draft keel

Sails
- Mainsail area: 125.38 sq ft (11.648 m^{2})
- Jib/genoa area: 201.45 sq ft (18.715 m^{2})
- Total sail area: 336.83 sq ft (31.293 m^{2})

Racing
- PHRF: 204 (average)

The Tanzer 27 is a recreational keelboat built by Tanzer Industries of Dorion, Quebec from 1982 to 1986. It was a continuation in production of the Paceship PY 26. That boat had been first built in 1972 by Paceship Yachts in Mahone Bay, Nova Scotia. Tanzer acquired the molds in the early 1980s and developed the design into the Tanzer 27. Compared to the Paceship, the Tanzer has deck-stepped mast in place of the keel-stepped mast, has a different interior, and is slightler longer.

It has a masthead sloop rig.

The fibreglass hull has a transom-hung rudder and displaces 6,200 lb (2,812 kg) and carries 2,250 lb (1,021 kg) of ballast. It has a hull speed of 6.36 kn (11.78 km/h).

The boat was built with a standard keel that gives a draft of 4.50 ft (1.37 m) and a PHRF racing average handicap of 204, with a high of 198 and a low of 210. A shoal-draft keel with a draft of 3.25 ft (0.99 m), was a factory option and had a PHRF racing average handicap of 231.
