= Fantasia 27 =

Sailboat class

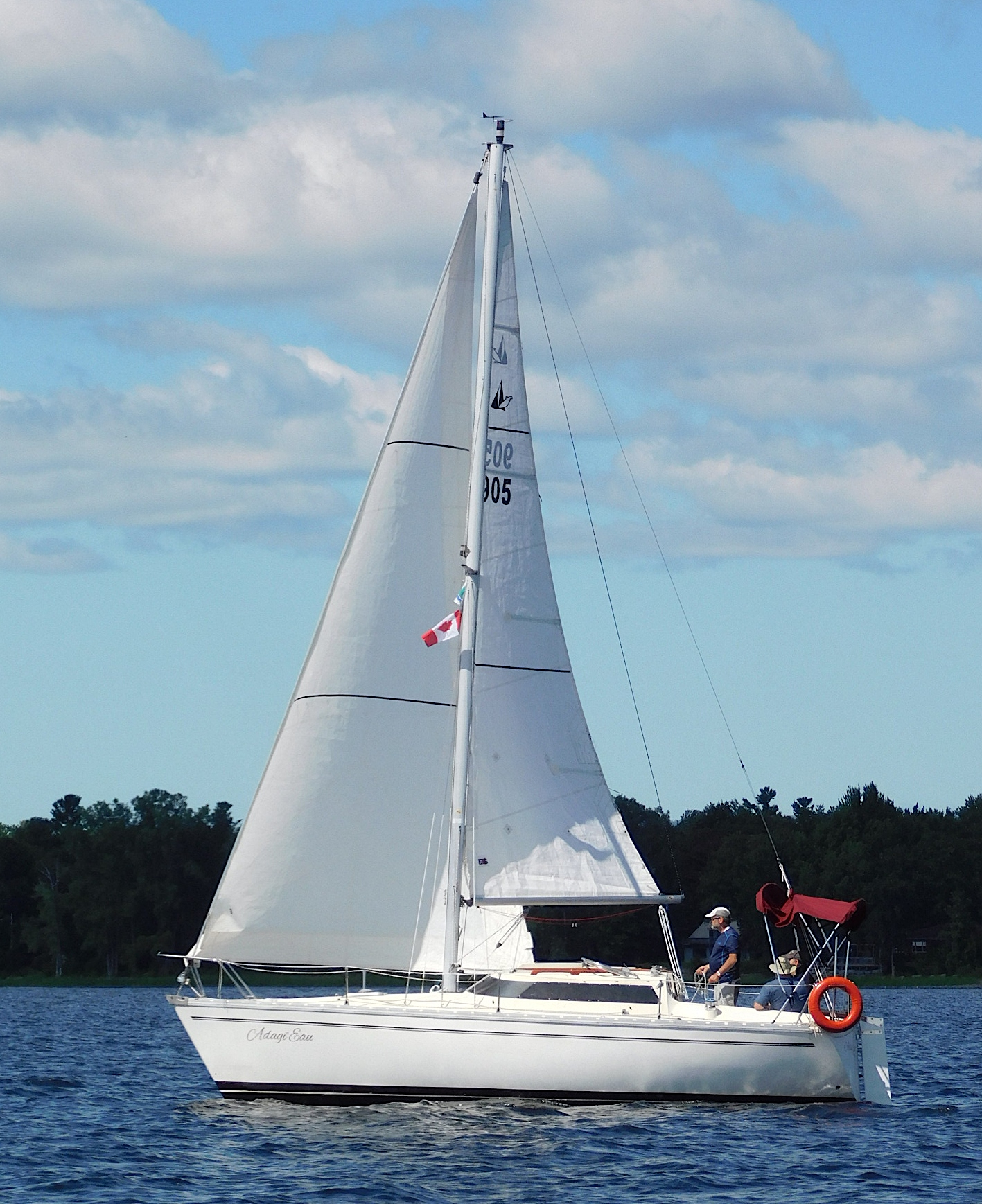

Development
- Designer: Philippe Harlé
- Location: France
- Year: 1981
- No. built: 1800
- Builder: Jeanneau
- Name: Fantasia 27

Boat
- Displacement: 5,027 lb (2,280 kg)
- Draft: 5.00 ft (1.52 m)

Hull
- Type: Monohull
- Construction: Fiberglass
- LOA: 27.23 ft (8.30 m)
- LWL: 21.52 ft (6.56 m)
- Beam: 9.45 ft (2.88 m)
- Engine: Yanmar 1GM10 9 hp (7 kW) diesel engine

Hull appendages
- Keel: fin keel, twin keels or centreboard
- Ballast: 1,653 lb (750 kg)
- Rudder: transom-mounted rudder

Rig
- General: Masthead sloop
- I foretriangle height: 31.82 ft (9.70 m)
- J foretriangle base: 10.08 ft (3.07 m)
- P mainsail luff: 26.58 ft (8.10 m)
- E mainsail foot: 9.17 ft (2.80 m)

Sails
- Mainsail area: 121.87 sq ft (11.322 m^{2})
- Jib/genoa area: 160.37 sq ft (14.899 m^{2})
- Total sail area: 282.24 sq ft (26.221 m^{2})

Racing
- PHRF: 195-222

The Fantasia 27 is a masthead sloop rigged recreational keelboat. 1800 were built in France from 1981 to 1996.

== Design ==
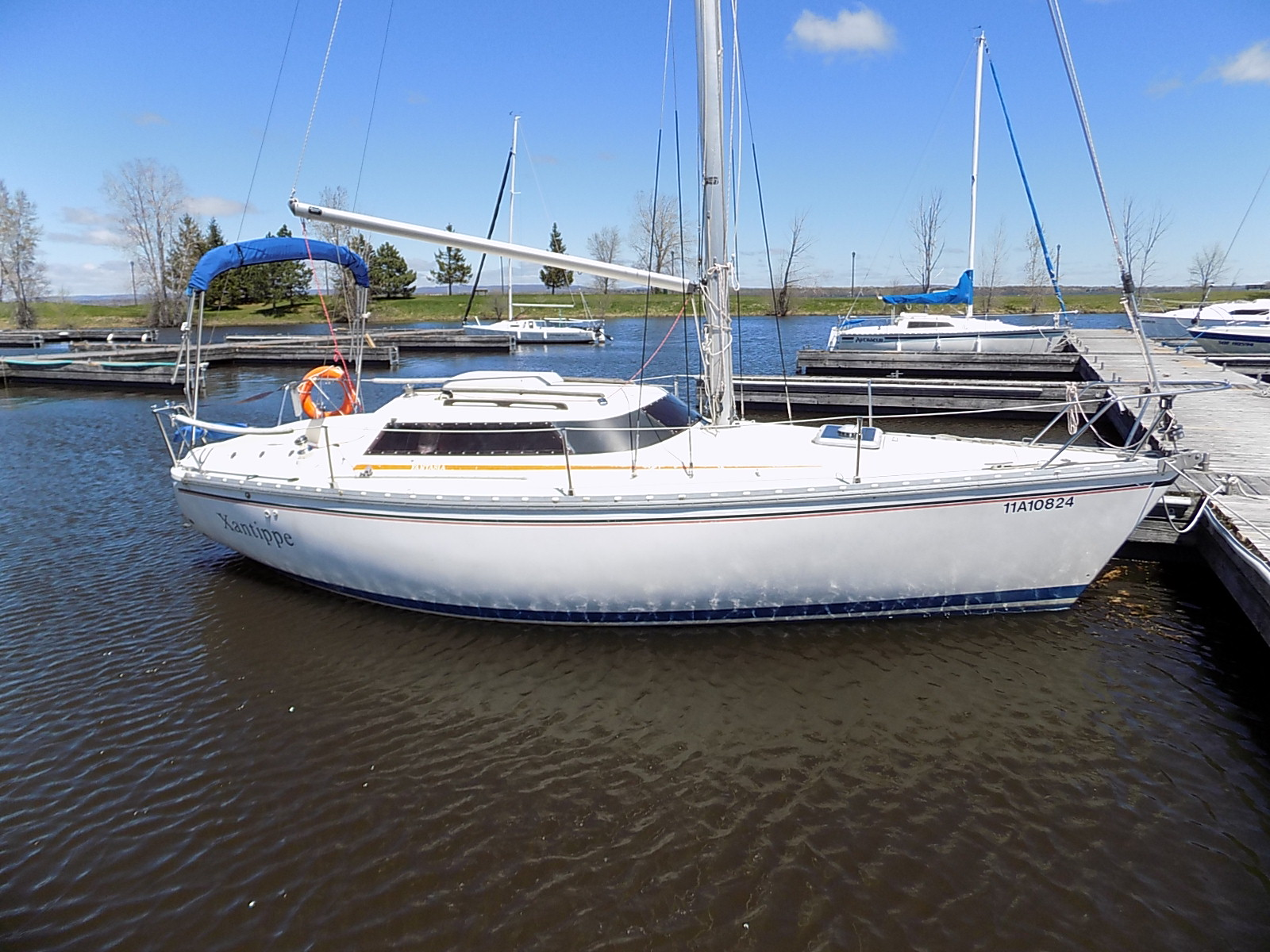
Fantasia 27

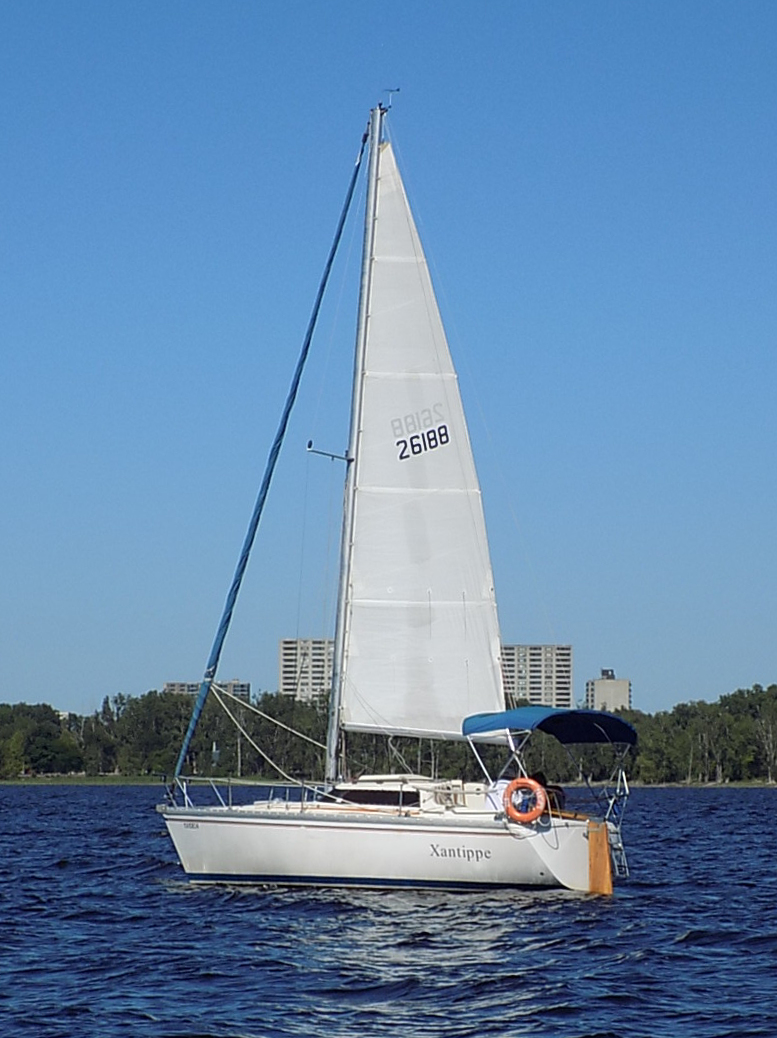
Fantasia 27

Designed by Philippe Harlé, the fiberglass hull has a transom-hung rudder.

The fin keel version displaces 5,291 lb (2,400 kg) with 1,653 lb (750 kg) of ballast. Draft is 5.00 ft (1.52 m)

The centreboard version displaces 5,578 lb (2,530 kg) with 1,940 lb (880 kg) of ballast. Draft is 5.58 ft (1.70 m) with the centreboard extended and 2.60 ft (0.79 m) with it retracted.

The twin keel version carries 1,918 lb (870 kg) of ballast. It has a draft of 3.44 ft (1.05 m)

The Fantasia 27 is fitted with a Yanmar 1GM10 diesel engine of 9 hp (7 kW). The fuel tank holds 6 U.S. gallons (23 L; 5.0 imp gal) and the fresh water tank has a capacity of 12 U.S. gallons (45 L; 10.0 imp gal).

The design has sleeping accommodation for four people, with a double "V"-berth in the bow and an aft cabin with a double berth on the port side. The galley is located on the port side just forward of the companionway ladder. The galley is L-shaped and is equipped with a two-burner stove, an ice box and a sink. A navigation station is opposite the galley, on the starboard side. The head is located aft on the starboard side.

The boat has a hull speed of 6.21 kn (11.50 km/h).

The design has a PHRF handicap of 195-222 for the fin keel model, 116-225 for the centerboard model and 204-222 for the twin keel model.
