= Hullmaster 27 =

1970s Canadian recreational keelboat

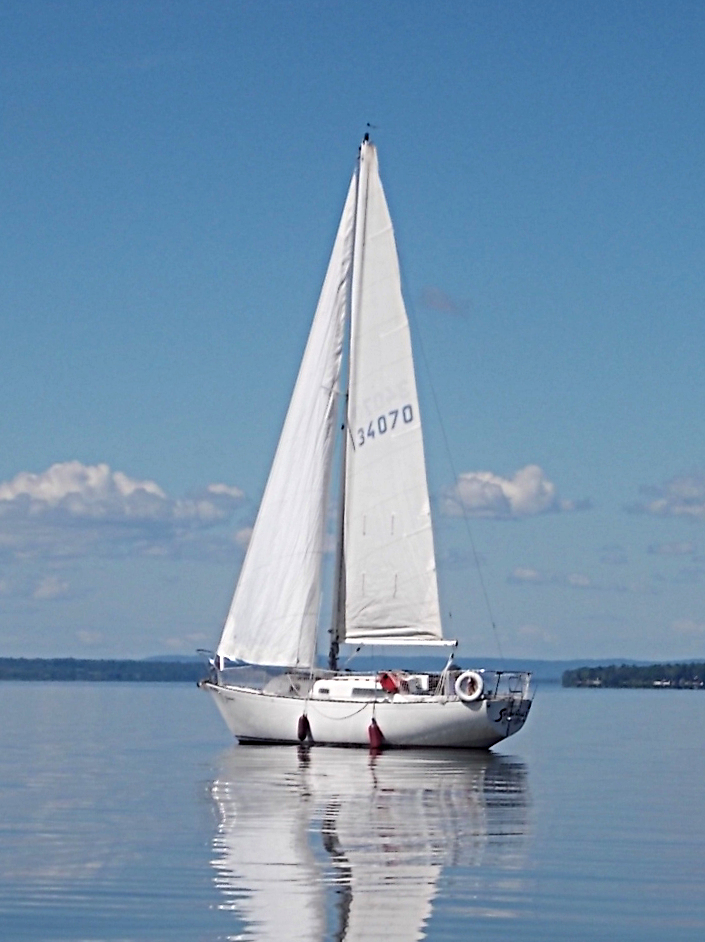

Development
- Designer: Edward S. Brewer and Robert Walstrom
- Location: Canada
- Year: 1974
- No. built: 40
- Builder: Hullmaster Boats/DS Yachts
- Name: Hullmaster 27

Boat
- Displacement: 7,400 lb (3,357 kg)
- Draft: 4.25 ft (1.30 m)

Hull
- Type: Monohull
- Construction: Fiberglass
- LOA: 27.25 ft (8.31 m)
- LWL: 21.50 ft (6.55 m)
- Beam: 9.25 ft (2.82 m)

Hull appendages
- Keel: fin keel
- Ballast: 3,000 lb (1,361 kg)
- Rudder: skeg-mounted rudder

Rig
- General: Masthead sloop
- I foretriangle height: 37.50 ft (11.43 m)
- J foretriangle base: 11.25 ft (3.43 m)
- P mainsail luff: 32.50 ft (9.91 m)
- E mainsail foot: 11.50 ft (3.51 m)

Sails
- Mainsail area: 186.88 sq ft (17.362 m^{2})
- Jib/genoa area: 210.94 sq ft (19.597 m^{2})
- Total sail area: 397.81 sq ft (36.958 m^{2})

Racing
- PHRF: 225 (average)

The Hullmaster 27, is a recreational keelboatbuilt in Canada by Hullmaster Boats as the Hullmaster 27 and DS Yachts as the HM-27, with 40 examples completed.

The Hullmaster 27 is built predominantly of fiberglass, with wood trim. It has a masthead sloop rig, a skeg-mounted rudder and a fixed fin keel. It displaces 7,400 lb (3,357 kg) and carries 3,000 lb (1,361 kg) of ballast.

The boat has a draft of 4.25 ft (1.30 m) with the standard keel.

The boat has a PHRF racing average handicap of 225 with a high of 222 and low of 231. It has a hull speed of 6.21 kn (11.50 km/h).
