= Capri 25 =

Sailboat class

Development
- Designer: Frank Butler
- Location: United States
- Year: 1980
- Builder: Catalina Yachts
- Name: Capri 25

Boat
- Displacement: 2,950 lb (1,338 kg)
- Draft: 4.20 ft (1.28 m)

Hull
- Type: Monohull
- Construction: Fiberglass
- LOA: 24.58 ft (7.49 m)
- LWL: 19.16 ft (5.84 m)
- Beam: 9.16 ft (2.79 m)
- Engine: Outboard motor

Hull appendages
- Keel: fin keel
- Ballast: 900 lb (408 kg)
- Rudder: internally-mounted spade-type rudder

Rig
- Rig type: Bermuda rig
- I foretriangle height: 30.75 ft (9.37 m)
- J foretriangle base: 9.83 ft (3.00 m)
- P mainsail luff: 26.50 ft (8.08 m)
- E mainsail foot: 9.50 ft (2.90 m)

Sails
- Sailplan: Masthead sloop
- Mainsail area: 125.88 sq ft (11.695 m^{2})
- Jib/genoa area: 151.14 sq ft (14.041 m^{2})
- Total sail area: 277.01 sq ft (25.735 m^{2})

Racing
- PHRF: 171

The Capri 25 is an American trailerable sailboat that was designed by Frank Butler as a one design racer and first built in 1980.

The design is sometimes confused with the Catalina 25, an unrelated 1978 design from the same manufacturer.

== Production ==
The design was built by Catalina Yachts in the United States between 1980 and 1986, but it is now out of production.

== Design ==
The Capri 25 is a recreational keelboat, built predominantly of fiberglass. It has a masthead sloop rig, a spooned raked stem, a vertical transom, an internally mounted spade-type rudder controlled by a tiller and a fixed fin keel. It displaces 2,950 lb (1,338 kg) and carries 900 lb (408 kg) of lead ballast.

The boat has a draft of 4.20 ft (1.28 m) with the standard keel fitted. The boat is normally fitted with a small 4 to 6 hp (3 to 4 kW) outboard motor for docking and maneuvering.

Accommodations consist of a bow "V"-berth, with two more settee berths in the main cabin. The galley consists of a sink and an ice box located under the companionway ladder. The head is a chemical type and located under the "V"-berth in the bow.

The cockpit is split, with the mainsheet traveler just ahead of the tiller. There are two jib winches mounted on the cockpit sides and two further winches on the cabin top for the halyards. A spinnaker is used for racing.

The design has a PHRF racing average handicap of 171 and a hull speed of 5.87 kn (10.87 km/h).

== Operational history ==
In a 2010 review Steve Henkel wrote, "The Capri 25 (by Catalina) is nothing like a Catalina 25 ... The Capri is five inches shorter on deck, three feet shorter on the waterline, and weighs almost 1,400 pounds less than the Catalina, so we suppose you could call her a Catalina "Lite," especially since her towing weight is over a ton less, so you can use a smaller, lighter towing vehicle on the highway. Besides her lower weight, she has slightly more sail area and a sleeker fin keel, so she is also faster—way faster. In fact, her average PHRF rating is 171, which is, amazingly, 3 seconds per mile less than the legendary J/24, and a whopping 54 seconds less than the Catalina 25. Needless to say, part of her weight loss is accomplished by the omission of cabin furniture and other niceties like the Catalina's on-deck anchor locker. Other weight saving is achieved by eliminating 600 pounds of ballast, and by using a then-new material, Coremat, to replace some of the hull and deck laminate. Best features: If you like round-the-buoys racing and/or socializing in a one-design fleet, this may be the boat for you. She has a bit more space below than a J/24, and six inches more headroom, but otherwise her character is in the same range. Worst features: Nothing significant noticed."

Ben Towery, described buying and racing a Capri 25 in Utah for Sailing World in 2019, calling it "a sleek 1980s design, a decent interior and a wide deck".

== See also ==
- List of sailing boat types
