= Catalina 18 =

Sailboat class

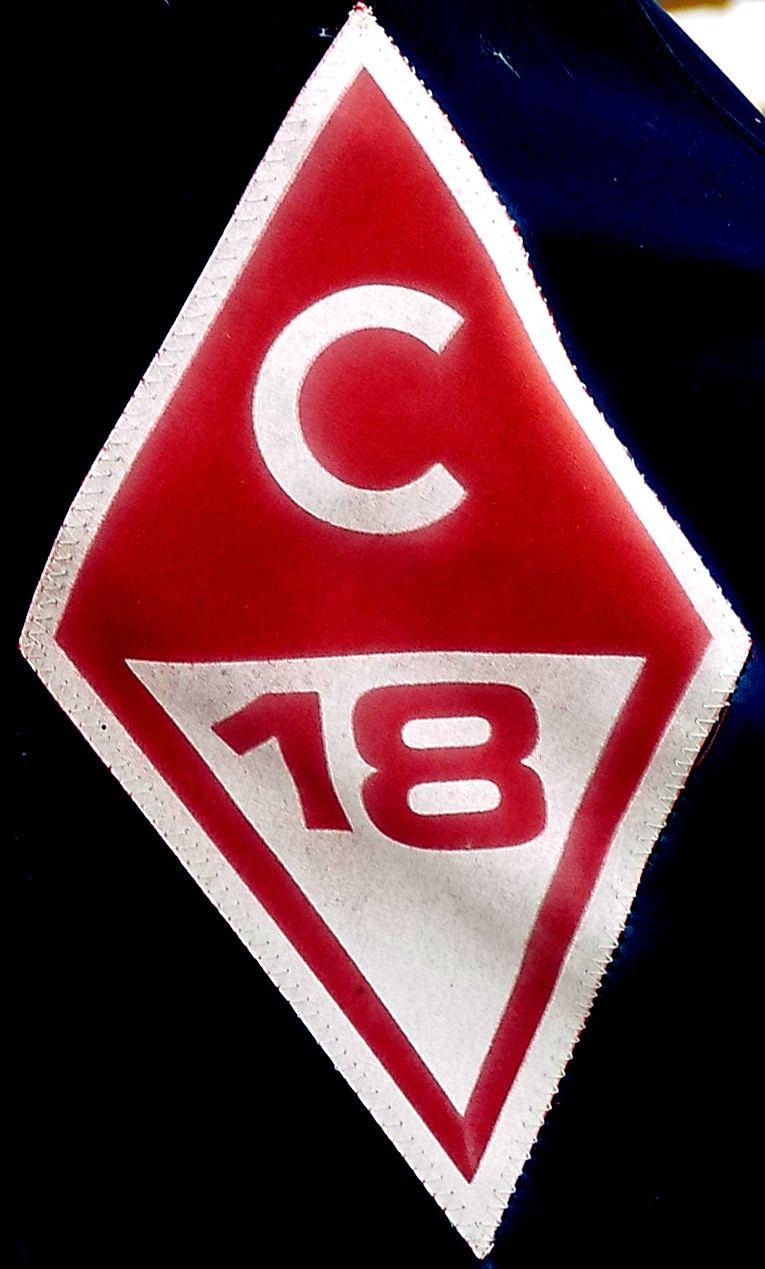
- Class symbol

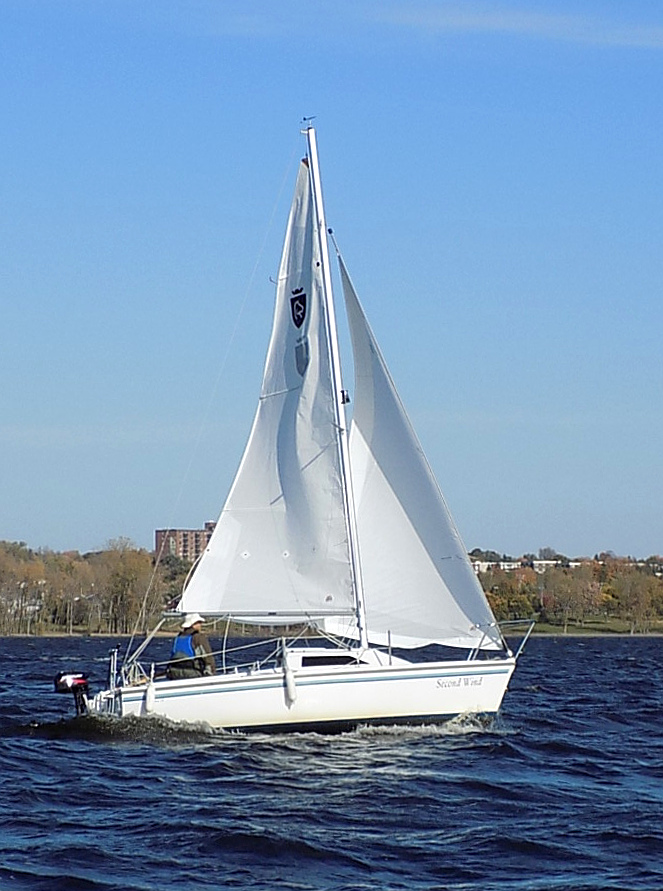

Development
- Designer: Frank Butler and Gerry Douglas
- Location: United States
- Year: 1985
- Builder: Catalina Yachts
- Name: Catalina 18

Boat
- Displacement: 1,500 lb (680 kg)
- Draft: 2.33 ft (0.71 m)

Hull
- Type: Monohull
- Construction: Fiberglass
- LOA: 18.00 ft (5.49 m)
- LWL: 16.33 ft (4.98 m)
- Beam: 7.58 ft (2.31 m)
- Engine: Outboard motor

Hull appendages
- Keel: wing keel
- Ballast: 425 lb (193 kg)
- Rudder: transom-mounted rudder

Rig
- Rig type: Bermuda rig
- I foretriangle height: 20.00 ft (6.10 m)
- J foretriangle base: 6.50 ft (1.98 m)
- P mainsail luff: 20.25 ft (6.17 m)
- E mainsail foot: 8.50 ft (2.59 m)

Sails
- Sailplan: Fractional rigged sloop
- Mainsail area: 86.06 sq ft (7.995 m^{2})
- Jib/genoa area: 65.00 sq ft (6.039 m^{2})
- Total sail area: 151.06 sq ft (14.034 m^{2})

The Catalina 18, formerly known as the Capri 18, is a trailerable American sailboat that was designed by Frank Butler and Gerry Douglas and first built in 1985.

The design was originally marketed as the Capri 18, but the name was changed by the manufacturer to Catalina 18 in 2000.

== Production ==
The design was built by Catalina Yachts in the United States, but it is now out of production.

== Design ==
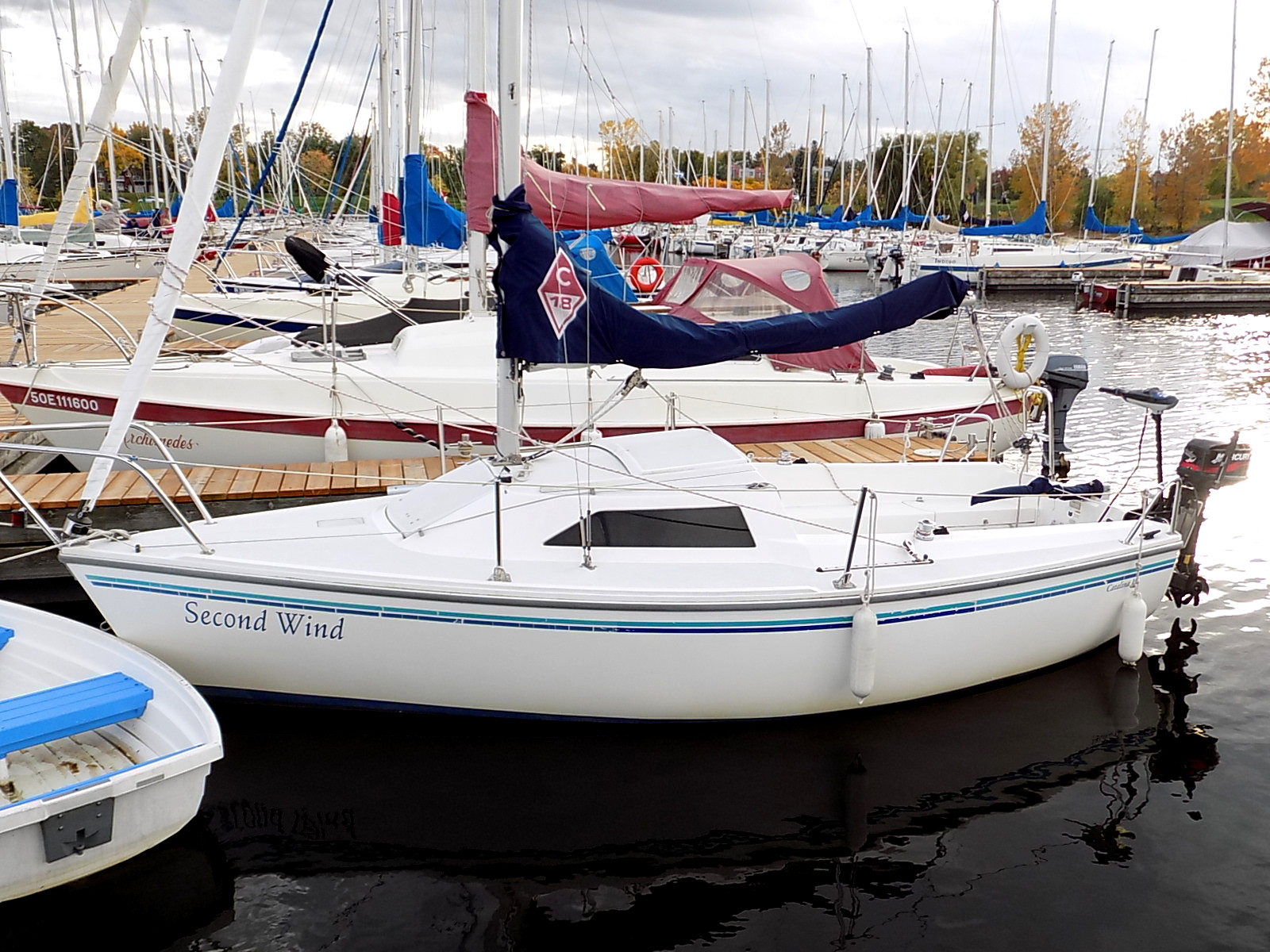
Catalina 18

The Catalina 18 is a small recreational keelboat, built predominantly of fiberglass. It has a fractional sloop rig, a raked stem, a vertical transom, a transom-hung rudder controlled by a tiller and a fixed wing keel or fin keel. It displaces 1,500 lb (680 kg) and carries 425 lb (193 kg) of ballast.

The boat has a draft of 2.33 ft (0.71 m) with the standard wing keel fitted or 2.00 ft (0.61 m) with fin keel. The wing keel was originally an option, but became standard equipment during the production run and the fin keel removed as an option.

The boat is normally fitted with a small 3 to 6 hp (2 to 4 kW) outboard motor for docking and maneuvering.

The design has sleeping accommodation for two adults and two children with two straight settees in the main cabin that can be joined with filler cushions and a "children's berth" in the forepeak. There is no galley. Instead, there is a cooler stowed just aft of the companionway ladder. The head is a portable type, located just aft of the bow cabin. Cabin headroom is 42 in (110 cm).

The design has a hull speed of 5.41 kn (10.02 km/h).

== Operational history ==
In a 2010 review Steve Henkel wrote, "The Capri 18 is one step up from her little sister, the Capri 16. Whether it is worth spending roughly 40% more (new) to gain two feet of length and 150 more pounds of displacement is up to the customer. Best features: She sleeps only two—perhaps a plus on a boat this small—and on a very big double berth, when the two filler cushions are in place. Foam flotation is standard, Worst features: Low headroom, and the fact that she sleeps only two adults (plus two children forward), may deter some potential buyers (but the "children’s berth" is an ideal place to store personal gear when two are cruising). The lead ballast wing keel with a 2' 3" draft, which was an option early in the boat's production history but later was made standard, will make retrieving at a ramp more difficult than with the wingless 2' 0" fin keel, but won't much improve her so-so performance to weather. The mainsheet lead is poor, and there is no provision for a boom vang."

== See also ==
- List of sailing boat types

Similar sailboats

- Drascombe Lugger
- Hunter 18.5
- Hunter 19-1
- Hunter 19 (Europa)
- Mercury 18
- Naiad 18
- Sanibel 18
- Sandpiper 565
