= Coronado 15 =

Sailboat class

Development
- Designer: Frank V. Butler
- Location: United States
- Year: 1968
- No. built: 3800
- Builder: Catalina Yachts
- Role: Sailing dinghy
- Name: Coronado 15

Boat
- Crew: two
- Displacement: 385 lb (175 kg)
- Draft: 3.67 ft (1.12 m) with centerboard down

Hull
- Type: Monohull
- Construction: Fiberglass
- LOA: 15.33 ft (4.67 m)
- Beam: 5.67 ft (1.73 m)

Hull appendages
- Keel: centerboard
- Rudder: transom-mounted rudder

Rig
- Rig type: Bermuda rig

Sails
- Sailplan: Fractional rigged sloop
- Total sail area: 139 sq ft (12.9 m^{2})

Racing
- D-PN: 91.7

The Coronado 15 is an American sailing dinghy that was designed by Frank V. Butler as a one-design racer and first built in 1968.

== Production ==
The design was built by Catalina Yachts in the United States starting in 1968. The company built 3,800 examples of the design, but it is now out of production.

== Design ==
The Coronado 15 is a recreational planing sailboat, built predominantly of fiberglass. It has a fractional sloop rig with black anodized aluminum spars. The mast is flexible and supported by stainless steel standing rigging. The hull has a spooned plumb stem, a vertical transom, a transom-hung rudder controlled by a tiller and a retractable centerboard. It displaces 385 lb (175 kg). The boat is self-draining and has flotation added, making it unsinkable.

The boat has a draft of 3.67 ft (1.12 m) with the centerboard extended and 4 in (10 cm) with it retracted, allowing beaching or ground transportation on a trailer.

For sailing the design is equipped with hiking straps, a trapeze, an outhaul, boom vang, a high-mounted boom and a mainsheet traveler. It has a storage compartment under the foredeck, equipped with a hatch for access. A binnacle with a compass was a factory option, as was a "kick-up" rudder design and sail windows in the mainsail and jib.

The design has a Portsmouth Yardstick racing average handicap of 91.7 and is normally raced by a crew of two sailors.

== See also ==
- List of sailing boat types
