= Capri Cyclone =

Sailboat class

- Class symbol

Development
- Designer: Frank V. Butler
- Location: United States
- Year: 1970
- No. built: 2400
- Builder: Capri Yachts division of Catalina Yachts
- Role: Sailing dinghy
- Name: Capri Cyclone

Boat
- Crew: one or two
- Displacement: 145 lb (66 kg)
- Draft: 2.83 ft (0.86 m) with the daggerboard down

Hull
- Type: Monohull
- Construction: Fiberglass
- LOA: 13.00 ft (3.96 m)
- Beam: 4.92 ft (1.50 m)

Hull appendages
- Keel: daggerboard
- Rudder: transom-mounted rudder

Rig
- Rig type: stayed catboat rig

Sails
- Sailplan: catboat
- Mainsail area: 74.00 sq ft (6.875 m^{2})
- Total sail area: 74.00 sq ft (6.875 m^{2})

Racing
- D-PN: 96.3

The Capri Cyclone, also referred to as the Cyclone 13 or just the Cyclone, is an American sailing dinghy that was designed by Frank V. Butler as a one-design racer and first built in 1970.

== Production ==
The design was built by the Capri Yachts division of Catalina Yachts in the United States. A total of 2,400 boats were completed, but it is now out of production.

== Design ==
The Capri Cyclone is a recreational sailboat, built predominantly of fiberglass with foam flotation. It has a stayed catboat rig with a short forestay, aluminum spars, a flexible mast and a loose-footed mainsail with mid-boom sheeting and a full cockpit width mainsheet traveler. The hull design features a spooned raked stem, a vertical transom, a transom-hung fiberglass rudder controlled by a tiller and a retractable fiberglass daggerboard. There is a forward compartment for stowage, closed by a hatch. The boat displaces 145 lb (66 kg) and is capable of planing.

The design has a draft of 2.83 ft (0.86 m) with the daggerboard extended and 0.42 ft (13 cm) with it retracted, allowing beaching or ground transportation on a trailer or car roof rack.

The design was initially equipped with a sail of 78.00 sq ft (7.246 m^{2}), but the class association approved a modification to shorten the mast and reduce the sail area by re-cutting it to 74.00 sq ft (6.875 m^{2}) to improve both the performance of the boat and the handling. The manufacturer not only approved of the modification, but offered it free of charge.

For sailing the design is equipped with a self-bailing cockpit, hiking straps, an outhaul, Cunningham and a boom vang. Factory options included a sail window, a kick-up rudder and a two-piece mast to ease ground transport.

The design has a Portsmouth Yardstick racing average handicap of 96.3 and is normally raced by a crew of one or two sailors.

== Operational history ==
In a 1994 review Richard Sherwood wrote that the Cyclone is "a planing dinghy with a bendy mast. There is an unusually short forestay. For ease of cartopping, the mast may be ordered in two pieces. Both the centerboard and the rudder are fiberglass. A beaching rudder is available as an option."

== See also ==
- List of sailing boat types
