= Coronado Yachts =

American sailboat manufacturer

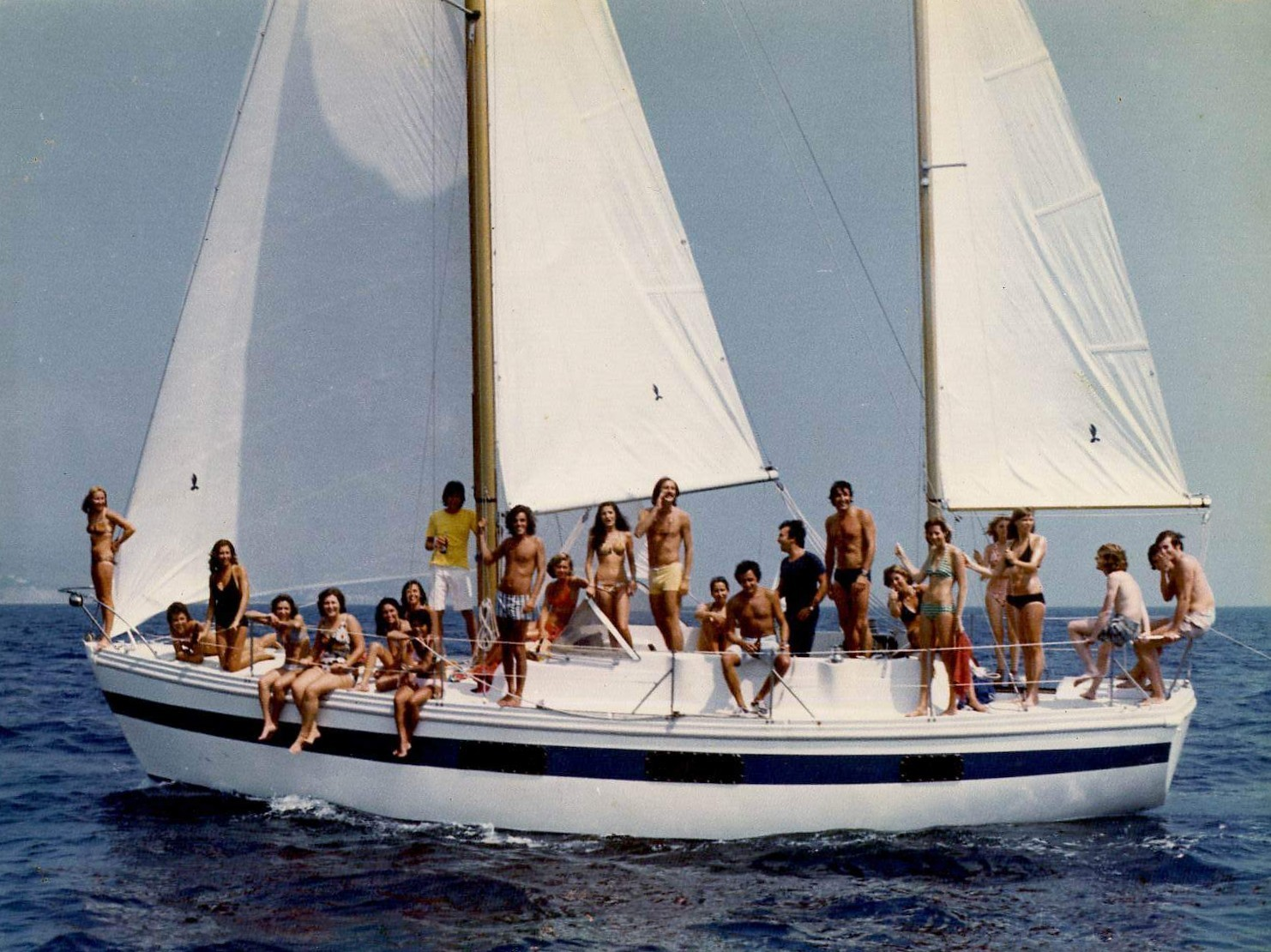
- An overloaded Coronado 35 sailing by the coast of Arenys de Mar (Spain)
- Industry: Sailboat manufacturing
- Founded: 1961
- Founder: Frank W. Butler

Coronado Yachts was an American sailboat manufacturer located in Southern California, which produced several popular lines in the 1960s and early 1970s. The company was founded by Frank W. Butler in 1961 and was sold to Whittaker in 1968.

== History ==
Frank W. Butler's initial intent was not to produce and sell boats, but rather to have one built. Prior to venturing into the boat business Frank was a business man running a machine shop.

In 1961, Butler took over the building of his own boat when boat builder ran out of funds and borrowed money from Butler; the builder was not able to repay the debt. Instead he gave Butler the tooling to continue building the boat. Butler later gained full control of the company, renaming it Wesco Marine and later Coronado Yachts. Many Early Coronado twenty fives have the Wesco Marine nameplate on their transom.

Among the first models built by Coronado were the Victory '21 and the Super Satellite. Production for the Coronado '25 began in 1964. It was the first boat with a one piece interior, making the boat stronger, lighter, and less expensive than previous models.

In 1968, Butler sold Coronado to Whittaker which already owned Columbia Yachts which was purchased from Dick Valdes in 1967. They also had acquired several power boat manufacturers. In 1969, the nameplates showed Coronado Yachts as a division of the Whittaker Corp. Whittaker also produced some other interesting marine related products such a life pods used for emergency evac. on offshore oil rigs. The Coronado's were originally produced only in the plant in Costa Mesa, CA, but eventually larger boats were built in Virginia.

By 1969, the Coronado 27 and 30 foot models were being produced. Butler remained with Whitaker for only one year then left due to disagreements with management at Whitaker over the production of a trailerable 22 foot boat with a movable keel. Butler went on to found Catalina Yachts, currently the largest sailboat manufacturer in the world, with his first product being the trailerable 22 foot boat with a movable keel.

Dick Valdes left Whittaker in 1972. Eventually many of the Coronado boats became cross branding of the Columbia models. Whitaker continued the Coronado line until 1974 producing the Coronado 34 and center cockpit Coronado 35. By 1979 Whittaker sold Columbia and the brand was defunct by the mid-1980s.

Wesco Marine still exists, owned by Frank Butler, and is a supplier for Catalina Yachts.

The Coronado 25 has a generous fixed keel, broad beam to length ratio, and shipped with spinnaker rigging. The outboard motor mount is enclosed on 4 sides, shielding the engine from fast back swells during rough weather. The tiller is long enough to allow a seated skipper to adjust the jib sheets while controlling the tiller.

== Coronado models ==
- Coronado Super Satellite 1964
- Aurora 21 1964
- Victory 21 1964
- Avalon 25 1965
- Coronado 22 1967
- Coronado 23 1970
- Coronado 23-2 1974 (same as Columbia T-23)
- Coronado 25 1966
- Coronado 27 1970
- Coronado 28 1974
- Coronado 30 1969
- Coronado 32 1973
- Coronado 34 1966
- Coronado 35 1971
- Coronado 41 1972
- Coronado 45 1974

== See also ==
- List of sailboat designers and manufacturers
