= Catalina 27 =

Sailboat class

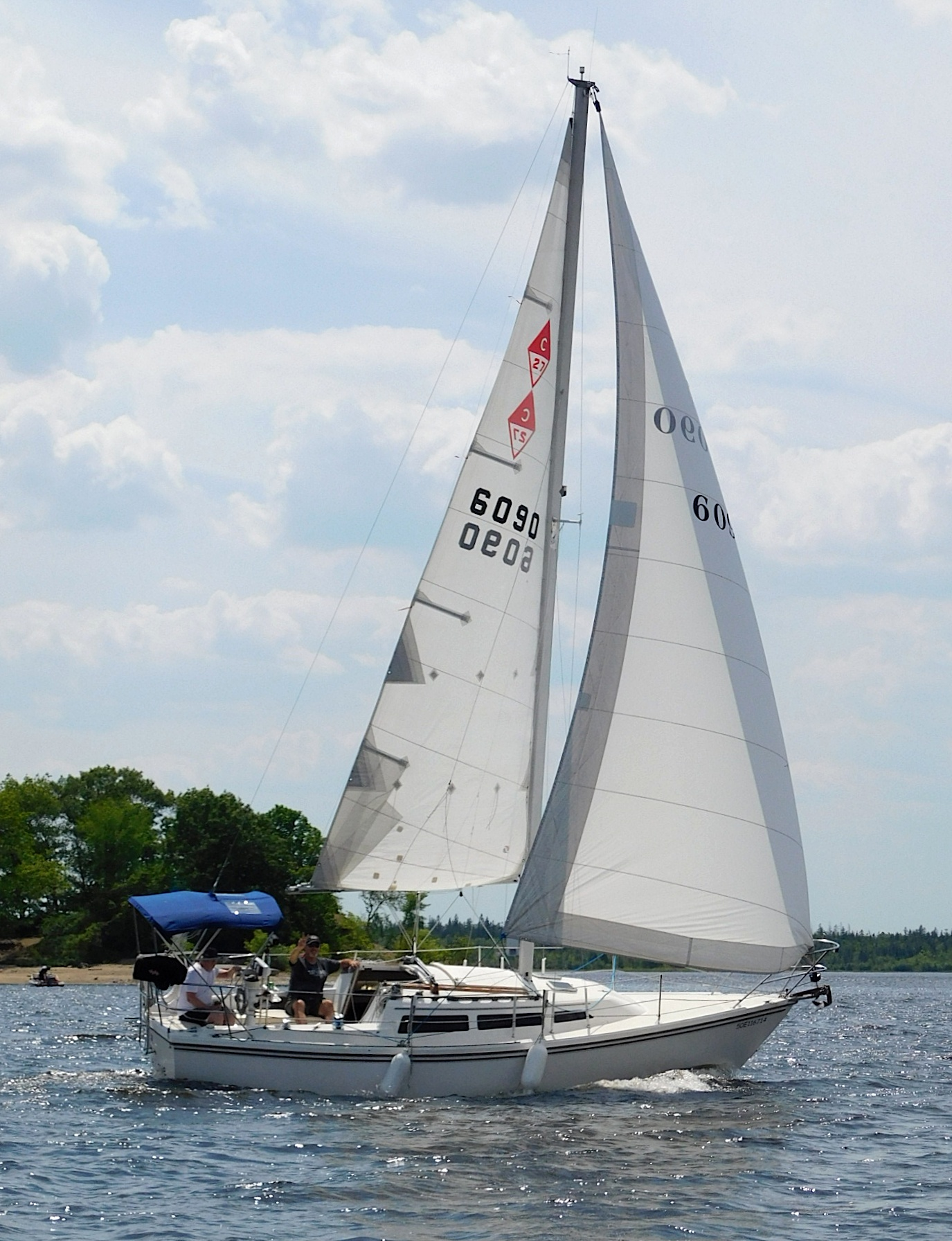

Development
- Designer: Frank V. Butler and Robert Finch
- Location: United States
- Year: 1971
- No. built: 6,662
- Builder: Catalina Yachts
- Name: Catalina 27

Boat
- Displacement: 6,850 lb (3,107 kg)
- Draft: 4.00 ft (1.22 m)

Hull
- Type: Monohull
- Construction: Fiberglass
- LOA: 26.83 ft (8.18 m)
- LWL: 21.75 ft (6.63 m)
- Beam: 8.83 ft (2.69 m)

Hull appendages
- Keel: fin keel
- Ballast: 2,700 lb (1,225 kg)
- Rudder: internally-mounted spade-type rudder

Rig
- General: Masthead sloop
- I foretriangle height: 34.00 ft (10.36 m)
- J foretriangle base: 11.25 ft (3.43 m)
- P mainsail luff: 28.67 ft (8.74 m)
- E mainsail foot: 10.50 ft (3.20 m)

Sails
- Mainsail area: 150.52 sq ft (13.984 m^{2})
- Jib/genoa area: 191.25 sq ft (17.768 m^{2})
- Total sail area: 341.77 sq ft (31.751 m^{2})

Racing
- PHRF: 204 (average)

The Catalina 27 is an American sailboat designed by Frank V. Butler and Robert Finch. The design became one of the most popular sailing keelboats of all time and was built from 1971 to 1991.

== Production ==
The boat was built by Catalina Yachts in the United States starting in 1971 and was also built under license in Canada by Cooper Enterprises. In the first three years of production, 1,500 boats were completed and sold. A total of 6,662 examples were completed.

The design was replaced in production by the Catalina 270 in 1991.

== Design ==
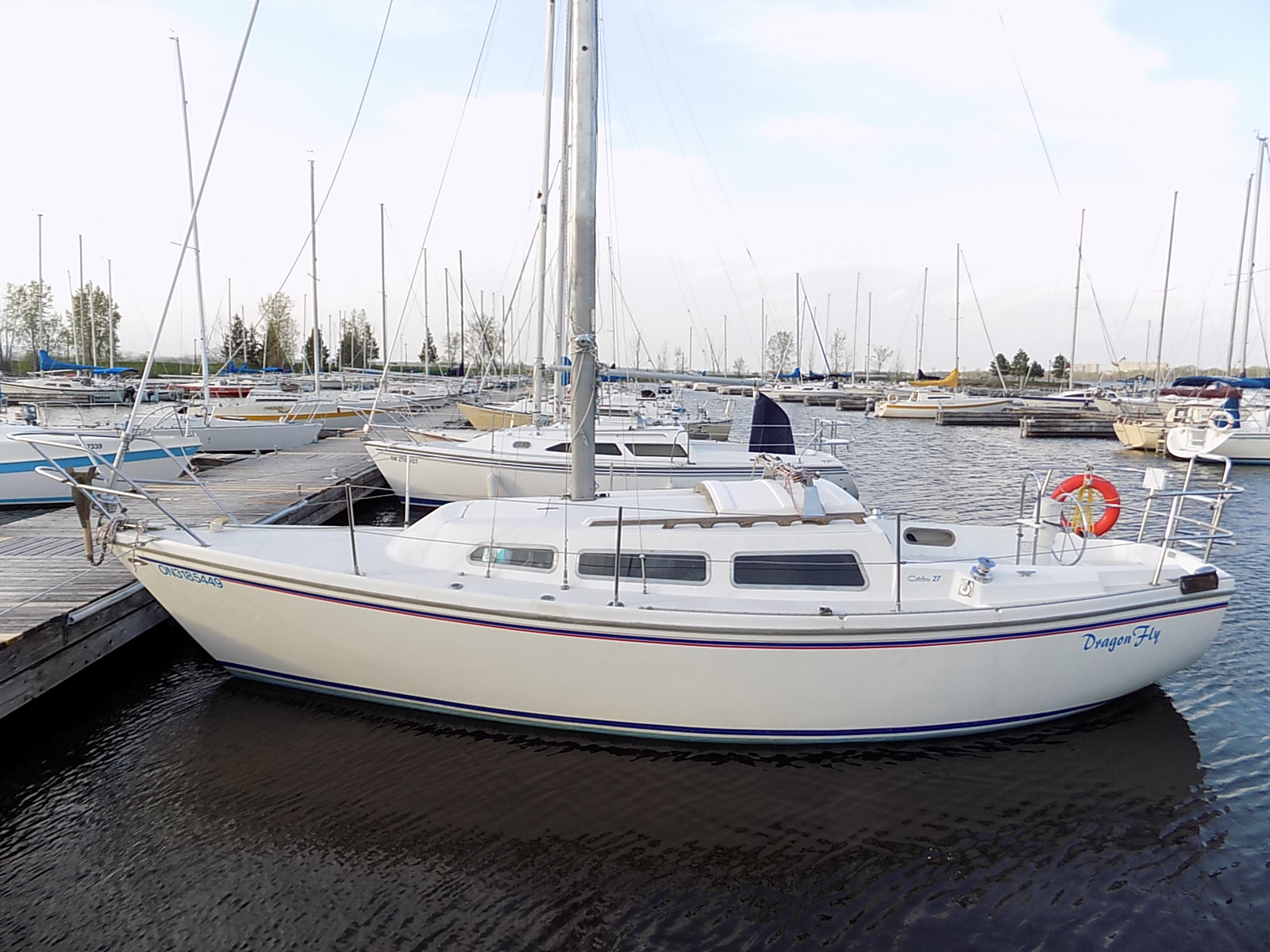
Catalina 27

The Catalina 27 is a small recreational keelboat, built predominantly of fiberglass. It has a masthead sloop rig, an internally-mounted spade-type rudder and a fixed fin keel. It displaces 6,850 lb (3,107 kg) and carries 2,700 lb (1,225 kg) of lead ballast.

Designed for inland sailing and not ocean passages, the boat's hull is made from solid fiberglass, while the deck has a plywood core. The hull and other parts were built with molded headliners to streamline production. Early boats were all fitted with a tiller, but later ones had a wheel steering as optional.

The boat has a draft of 4.00 ft (1.22 m) with the standard keel and 3.00 ft (0.91 m) with the optional shoal draft wing keel.

The boat was originally fitted with an outboard motor well, but some later ones were equipped with inboard Universal Atomic 4 gasoline or Universal diesel engines.

The boat has a PHRF racing average handicap of 204 with a high of 207 and low of 204. It has a hull speed of 6.25 kn (11.58 km/h).

== Operational history ==
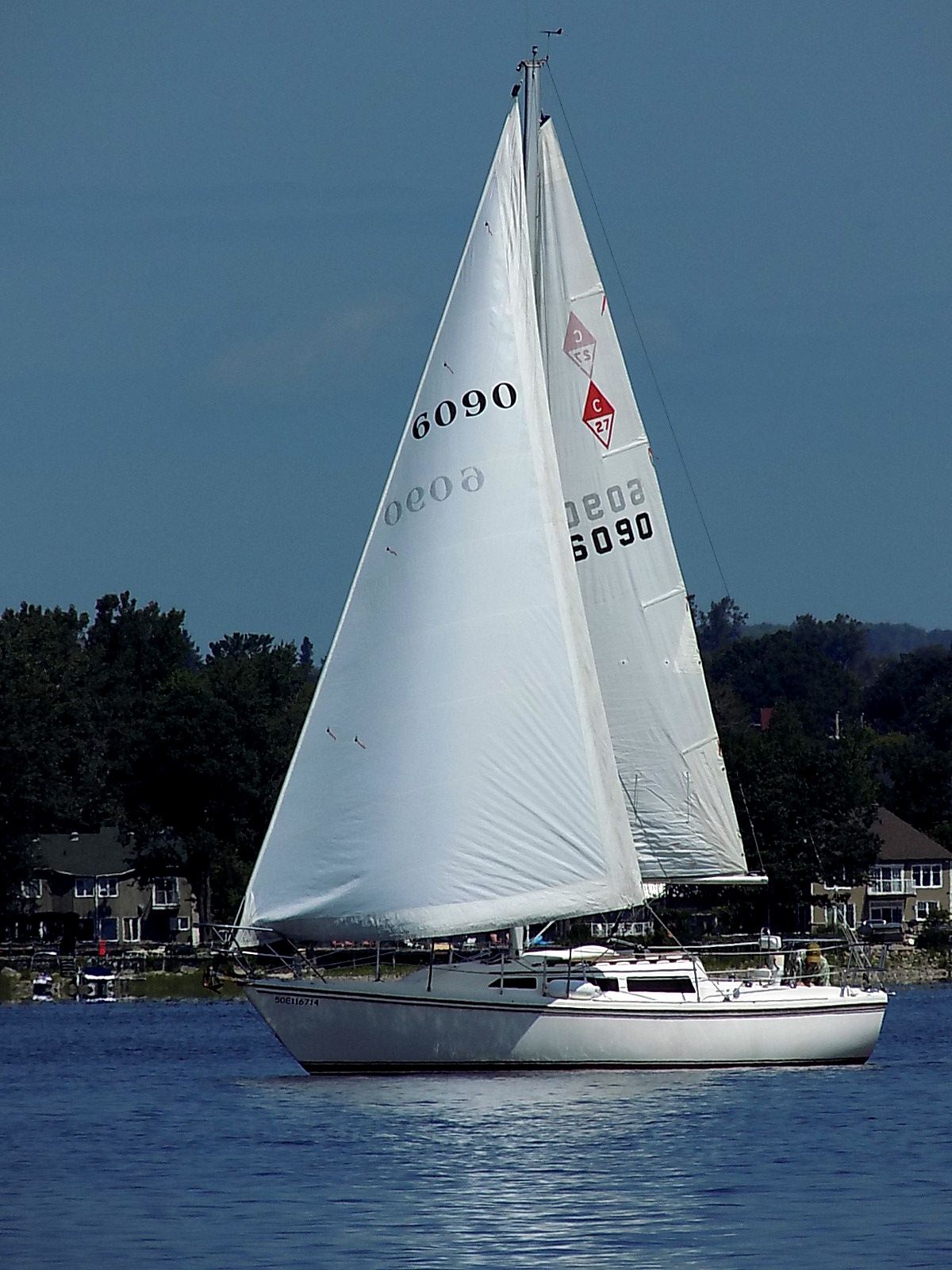
Catalina 27

The boat is supported by an active class club, the Catalina 27-270 Association.

Catalina 27s have been sailed from the mainland US to Bermuda and the Caribbean, and have also carried out globe circumnavigations.

In a 2002 review of the design as a used boat, Sail magazine writer John Kretschmer noted: "you don't buy a Catalina 27 for the craftsmanship, you buy it to have fun on the water ... One of the most surprising features of the 27 is how nicely it sails. The boat is fairly well balanced, and according to several owner reports, thrives upwind in moderate conditions. In heavy air the 27 is a bit tender and one owner suggests putting the first reef in the main at 12 knots." He concluded, "The Catalina 27 didn't become one of the most popular boats ever built without good reason. It offers good sailing, comfortable accommodations, one-design fleets and active owners groups."

== Variants ==
Catalina 27
Standard model with a draft of 4.00 ft (1.22 m).
Catalina 27 TM
Tall mast model with a mast about 2.00 ft (0.61 m) higher and the mast moved aft, for use in locations that have lighter winds on average.
Catalina 27 SD
Shallow draft model with a draft of 3.00 ft (0.91 m).
Catalina 27 SD TM
Tall mast model with a mast about 2.00 ft (0.61 m) higher and the mast moved aft, plus shallow draft keel, with a draft of 3.00 ft (0.91 m).

== See also ==
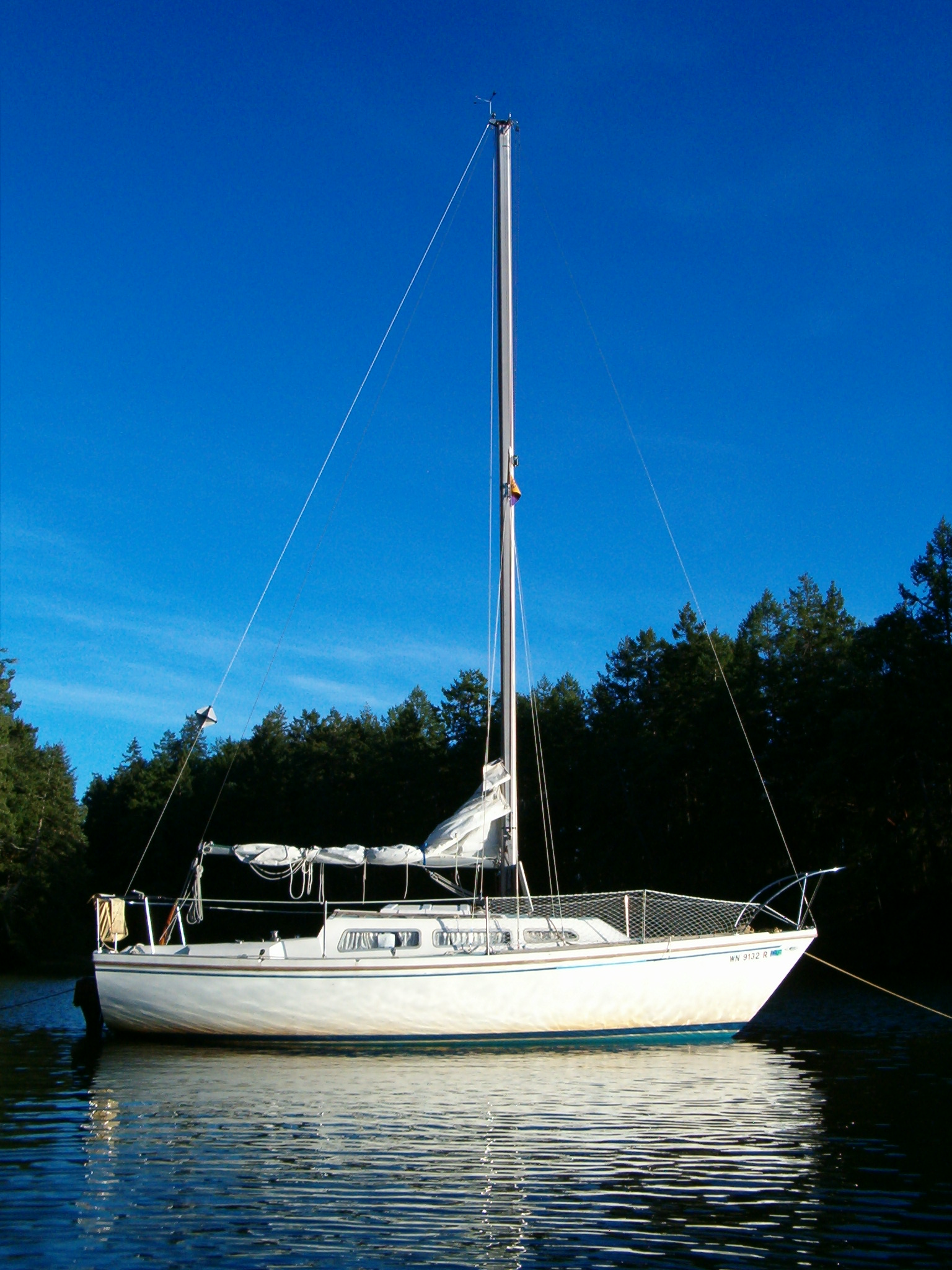
Catalina 27

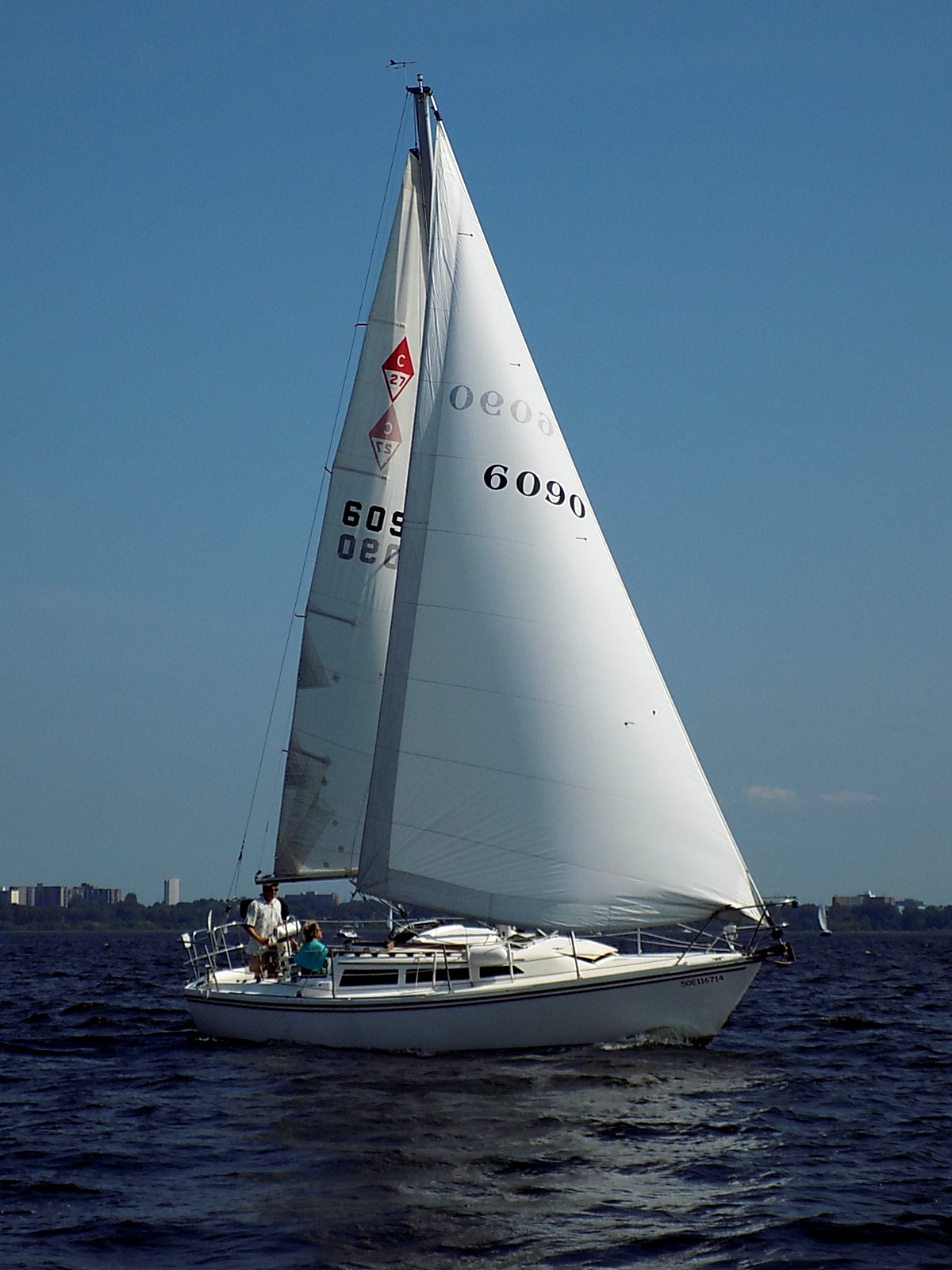
Catalina 27

- List of sailing boat types

Similar sailboats

- Aloha 27
- Cal 27
- Cal 2-27
- Cal 3-27
- C&C 27
- Catalina 275 Sport
- Crown 28
- CS 27
- Edel 820
- Express 27
- Fantasia 27
- Halman Horizon
- Hotfoot 27
- Hullmaster 27
- Hunter 27
- Hunter 27-2
- Hunter 27-3
- Irwin 27
- Island Packet 27
- Mirage 27 (Perry)
- Mirage 27 (Schmidt)
- O'Day 272
- Orion 27-2
- Watkins 27
- Watkins 27P
