= Coronado 25 =

Recreational keelboat built 1966–1975

Development
- Designer: Ed Edgar and Frank W. Butler
- Location: United States
- Year: 1966
- Builders: Coronado Yachts; Russell Marine
- Role: Cruiser

Boat
- Displacement: 4,500 lb (2,041 kg)
- Draft: 3.67 ft (1.12 m)

Hull
- Type: monohull
- Construction: fiberglass
- LOA: 25.00 ft (7.62 m)
- LWL: 20.05 ft (6.11 m)
- Beam: 8.00 ft (2.44 m)
- Engine: outboard motor

Hull appendages
- Keel: fin keel
- Ballast: 2,150 lb (975 kg)
- Rudder: internally-mounted spade-type rudder

Rig
- Rig type: Bermuda rig
- I foretriangle height: 31.50 ft (9.60 m)
- J foretriangle base: 9.00 ft (2.74 m)
- P mainsail luff: 27.75 ft (8.46 m)
- E mainsail foot: 11.90 ft (3.63 m)

Sails
- Sailplan: masthead sloop
- Mainsail area: 165.11 sq ft (15.339 m^{2})
- Jib/genoa area: 141.75 sq ft (13.169 m^{2})
- Total sail area: 306.86 sq ft (28.508 m^{2})

Racing
- PHRF: 231

The Coronado 25 is a recreational keelboat built by Coronado Yachts in the United States from 1966 to 1975. It was also built by Russell Marine in the United Kingdom.

Designed by Ed Edgar and Frank W. Butler the fiberglass hull has a spooned, raked stem; a raised counter, angled transom; an internally mounted spade-type rudder controlled by a tiller. It has a hull speed of 6.0 kn (11.1 km/h). It was available with a centerboard or fixed keel.

It has sleeping accommodation for five people, with a double "V"-berth, a dinette table that lowers into a double berth in the main cabin and an aft quarter berth on the port side. The galley is located on the port side just forward of the companionway ladder. The galley is equipped with a two-burner stove, an icebox and a sink. The head is located just aft of the bow cabin on the starboard side. Cabin headroom is 66 in (170 cm).

It has a masthead sloop rig.
