= Catalina 309 =

Sailboat class

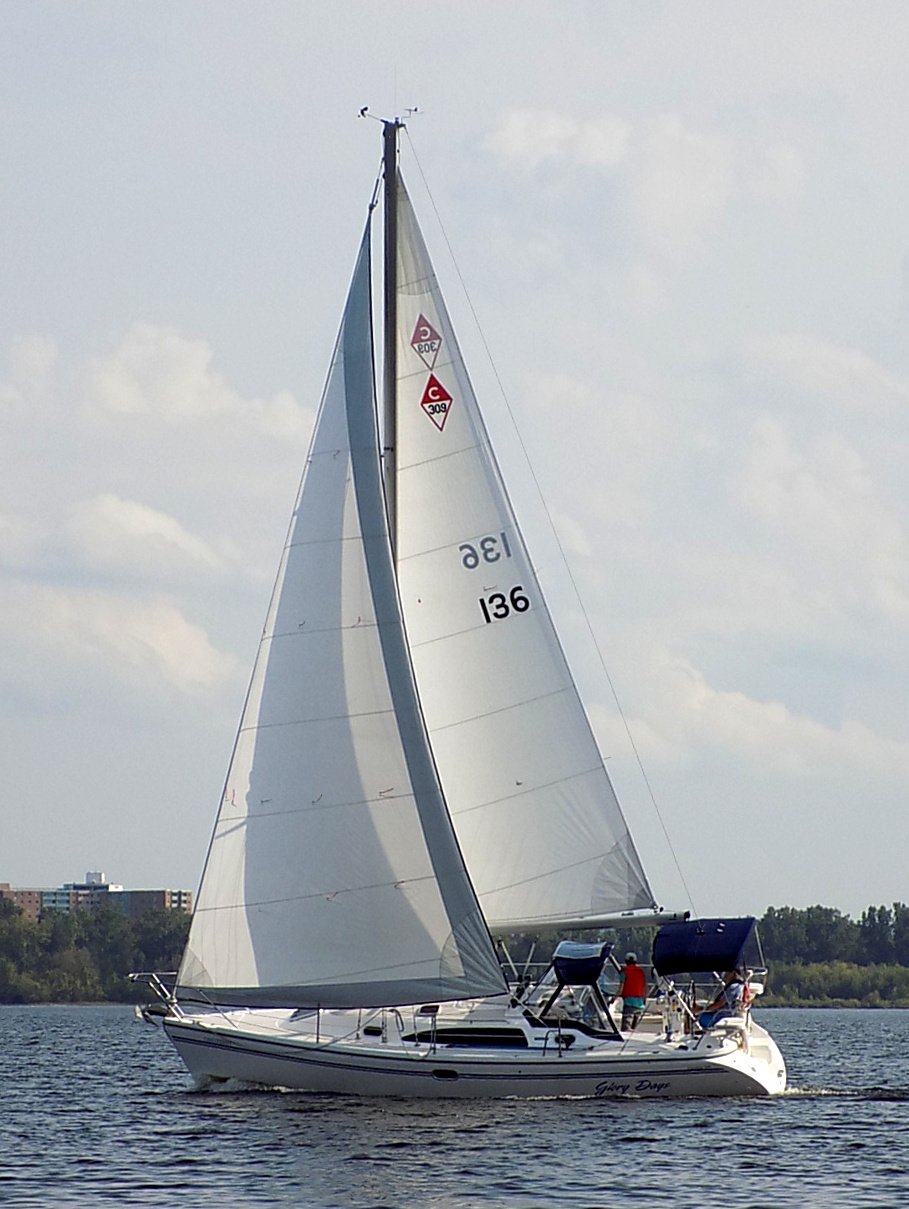

Development
- Designer: Gerry Douglas
- Location: United States
- Year: 2005
- Builder: Catalina Yachts
- Name: Catalina 309

Boat
- Displacement: 9,800 lb (4,445 kg)
- Draft: 6.25 ft (1.91 m)

Hull
- Type: Monohull
- Construction: Fiberglass
- LOA: 32.75 ft (9.98 m)
- LWL: 26.50 ft (8.08 m)
- Beam: 11.50 ft (3.51 m)
- Engine: Yanmar 3YM20 diesel engine 21 hp (16 kW)

Hull appendages
- Keel: fin keel
- Ballast: 4,000 lb (1,814 kg)
- Rudder: internally-mounted spade-type rudder

Rig
- General: Fractional rigged sloop
- I foretriangle height: 42.75 ft (13.03 m)
- J foretriangle base: 12.00 ft (3.66 m)
- P mainsail luff: 38.75 ft (11.81 m)
- E mainsail foot: 13.75 ft (4.19 m)

Sails
- Mainsail area: 266.41 sq ft (24.750 m^{2})
- Jib/genoa area: 256.50 sq ft (23.830 m^{2})
- Total sail area: 522.91 sq ft (48.580 m^{2})

The Catalina 309 is an American sailboat, that was designed by Gerry Douglas and first built in 2005.

== Production ==
The boat was built by Catalina Yachts in the United States starting in 2005, but is now out of production.

== Design ==
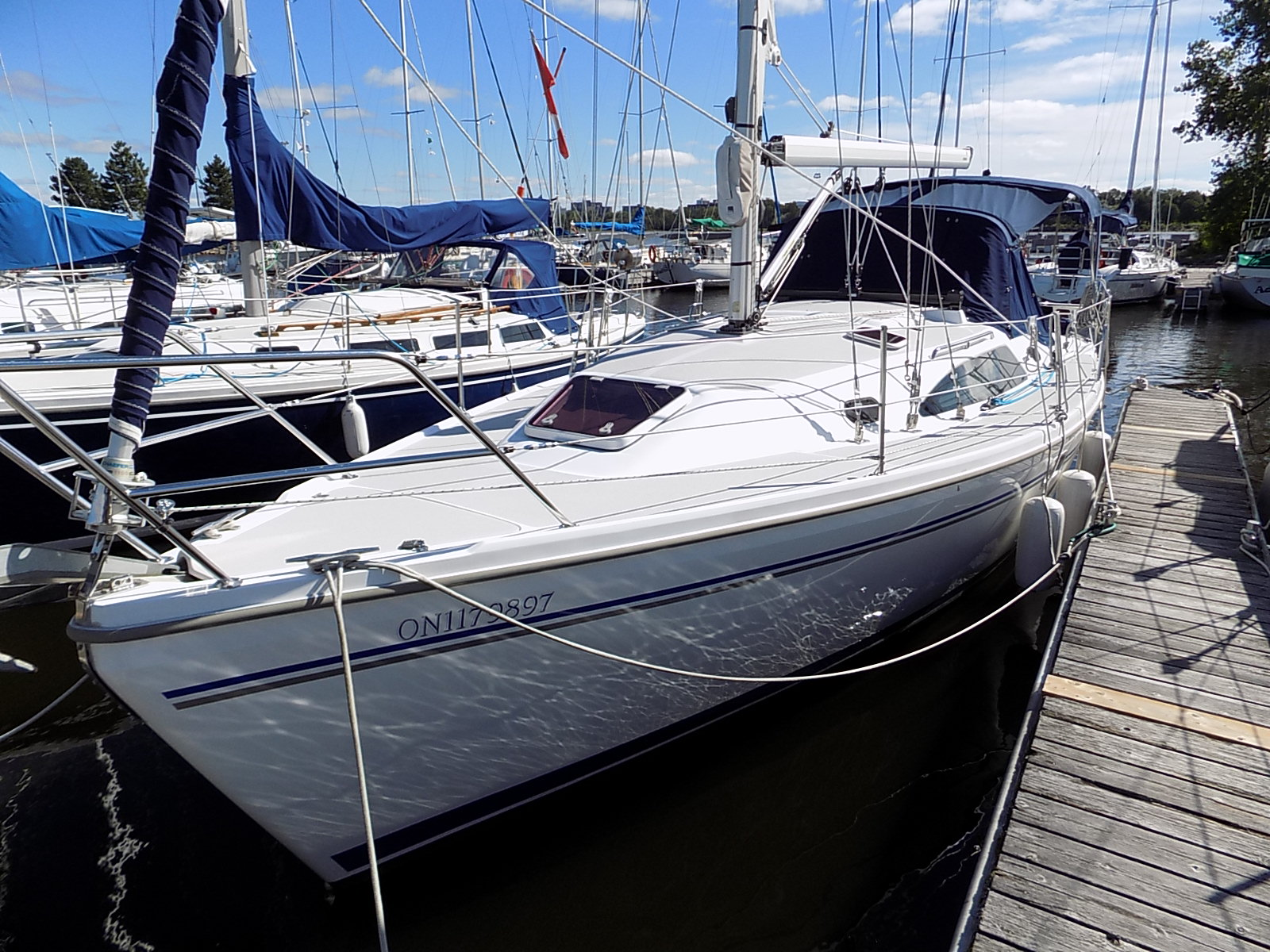
Catalina 309

The Catalina 309 is a small recreational keelboat, built predominantly of fiberglass. It has a fractional sloop rig, an internally-mounted spade-type rudder and a fixed fin keel. It displaces 9,800 lb (4,445 kg) and carries 4,000 lb (1,814 kg) of ballast.

The boat has a draft of 6.25 ft (1.91 m) with the standard keel and 4.4 ft (1.3 m) with the optional shoal draft wing keel.

The boat is fitted with a Japanese Yanmar 3YM20 diesel engine of 21 hp (16 kW). The fuel tank holds 27 U.S. gallons (100 L; 22 imp gal) and the fresh water tank has a capacity of 46 U.S. gallons (170 L; 38 imp gal).

The design has a hull speed of 6.9 kn (12.8 km/h).

== Operational history ==
The design was named a Boat of the Year winner by Cruising World magazine for 2007, including "top overall Domestic Boat of the Year award".

== See also ==
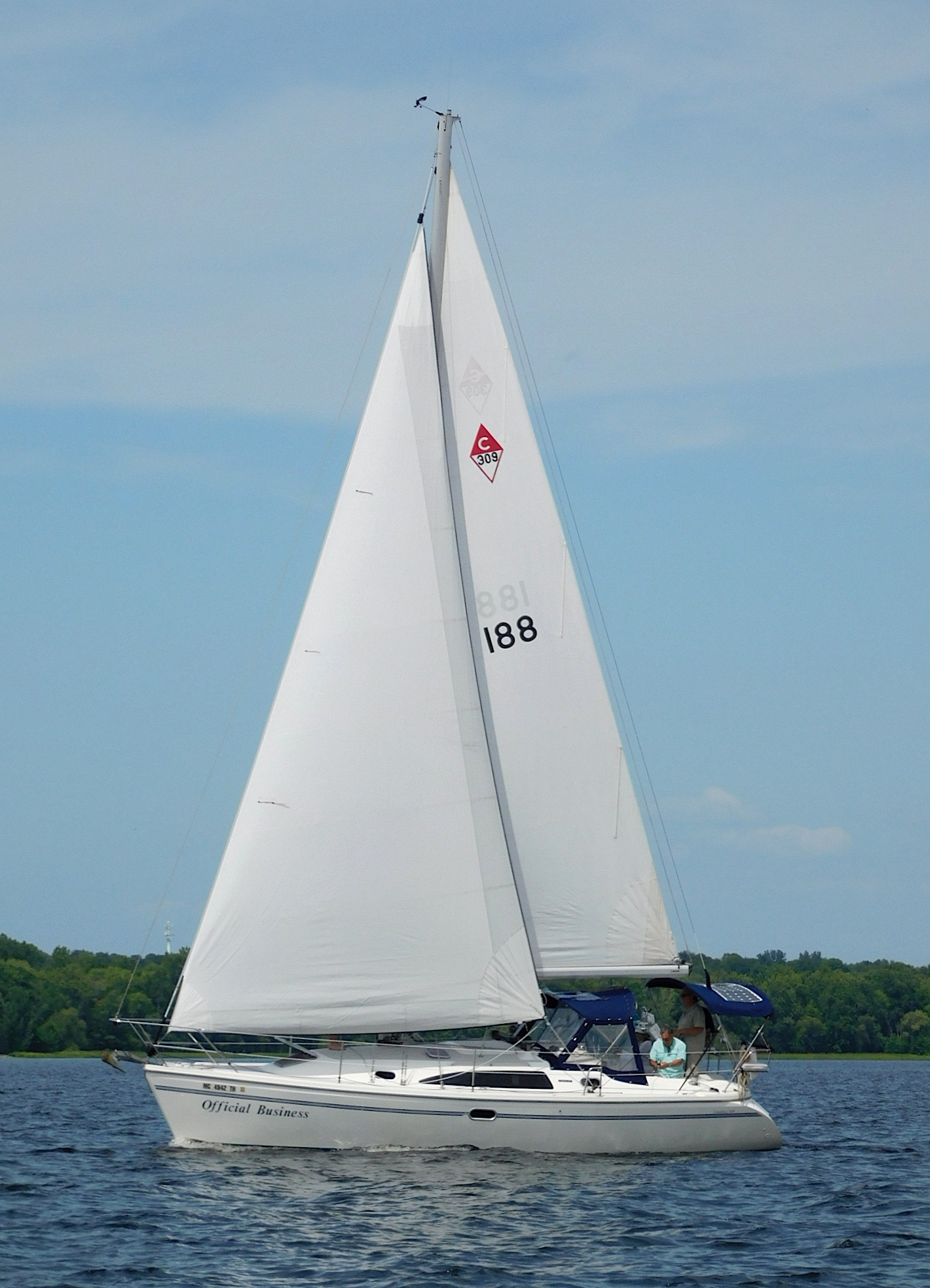
Catalina 309

- List of sailing boat types
