= Coronado 23 =

Sailboat class

Development
- Designer: William Crealock
- Location: United States
- Year: 1969
- Builder: Coronado Yachts
- Role: Cruiser-Racer

Boat
- Displacement: 2,300 lb (1,043 kg)
- Draft: 3.17 ft (0.97 m)

Hull
- Type: monohull
- Construction: fiberglass
- LOA: 22.58 ft (6.88 m)
- LWL: 20.08 ft (6.12 m)
- Beam: 7.75 ft (2.36 m)
- Engine: outboard motor

Hull appendages
- Keel: fin keel
- Ballast: 1,100 lb (499 kg)
- Rudder: internally-mounted spade-type rudder

Rig
- Rig type: Bermuda rig
- I foretriangle height: 26.58 ft (8.10 m)
- J foretriangle base: 9.00 ft (2.74 m)
- P mainsail luff: 23.50 ft (7.16 m)
- E mainsail foot: 10.25 ft (3.12 m)

Sails
- Sailplan: masthead sloop
- Mainsail area: 120.44 sq ft (11.189 m^{2})
- Jib/genoa area: 119.61 sq ft (11.112 m^{2})
- Total sail area: 240.05 sq ft (22.301 m^{2})

Racing
- PHRF: 270

The Coronado 23, also called the Sailcrafter 23, is an American trailerable sailboat that was designed by William Crealock as cruiser-racer and first built in 1969.

The design was originally marketed by the manufacturer as the Coronado 23, but a new and unrelated design was also introduced as the Coronado 23 in 1974 and replaced the original in production. The 1974 design is now usually referred to as the Coronado 23-2 to differentiate it from the earlier boat.

The Coronado 23 is a development of the Crealock-designed Columbia 22, but with a different deck and coach house roof.

== Production ==
The design was built by Coronado Yachts in the United States between 1969 and 1973, but it is now out of production.

A number of boats were sold as kits for amateur construction, under the name of Sailcrafter Custom Yachts.

== Design ==
The Coronado 23 is a recreational keelboat, built predominantly of fiberglass, with wood trim. It has a masthead sloop rig, a raked stem, a plumb transom, an internally mounted spade-type rudder controlled by a tiller and a fixed fin keel or a stub keel and centerboard.

The boat is normally fitted with a small 3 to 6 hp (2 to 4 kW) outboard motor for docking and maneuvering, located in a centered aft well.

The design has sleeping accommodation for four people, with a double "V"-berth in the bow cabin, a straight settee quarter berth on the starboard side of the main cabin and a drop-down dinette table berth on the port side. The galley is located on the starboard side amidships. The galley is equipped with a recessed stove, an ice box and a double sink. The head is located in the bow cabin, under the "V"-berth. Cabin headroom is 57 in (140 cm).

The design has a PHRF racing average handicap of 270 and a hull speed of 6.0 kn (11.1 km/h).

== Variants ==
Coronado 23
This fin keel model was introduced in 1969 and built until 1973. It displaces 2,300 lb (1,043 kg) and carries 1,100 lb (499 kg) of cast iron ballast. The boat has a draft of 3.17 ft (0.97 m) with the standard fin keel.
Coronado 23 CB
This stub keel and centerboard model was introduced in 1969 and built until 1972. It displaces 2,485 lb (1,127 kg) and carries 810 lb (367 kg) of ballast. The boat has a draft of 5.00 ft (1.52 m) with the centerboard down and 2.56 ft (0.78 m) with it retracted.

== Operational history ==
In a 2010 review Steve Henkel wrote, "Here is a boat that packs a lot of stuff into a limited space: four berths, a dinette, head, stove, icebox, and sink. There's also space in the cockpit for an outboard in a well, right at the feet of the helmsman ... For someone on a limited budget, this boat might be on their short list—or they might choose the almost identical Columbia 22 (with a different deck mold and a less extended bow) ... Best features: The placement of the outboard engine well under the tiller gives the helmsman very good access to the engine controls (although it reduces cockpit space somewhat). Worst features: Her PHRF seems to indicate a performance deficiency versus her comp[etitor]s."

== See also ==
- List of sailing boat types
