= Catalina 30 =

U.S. built recreational keelboat

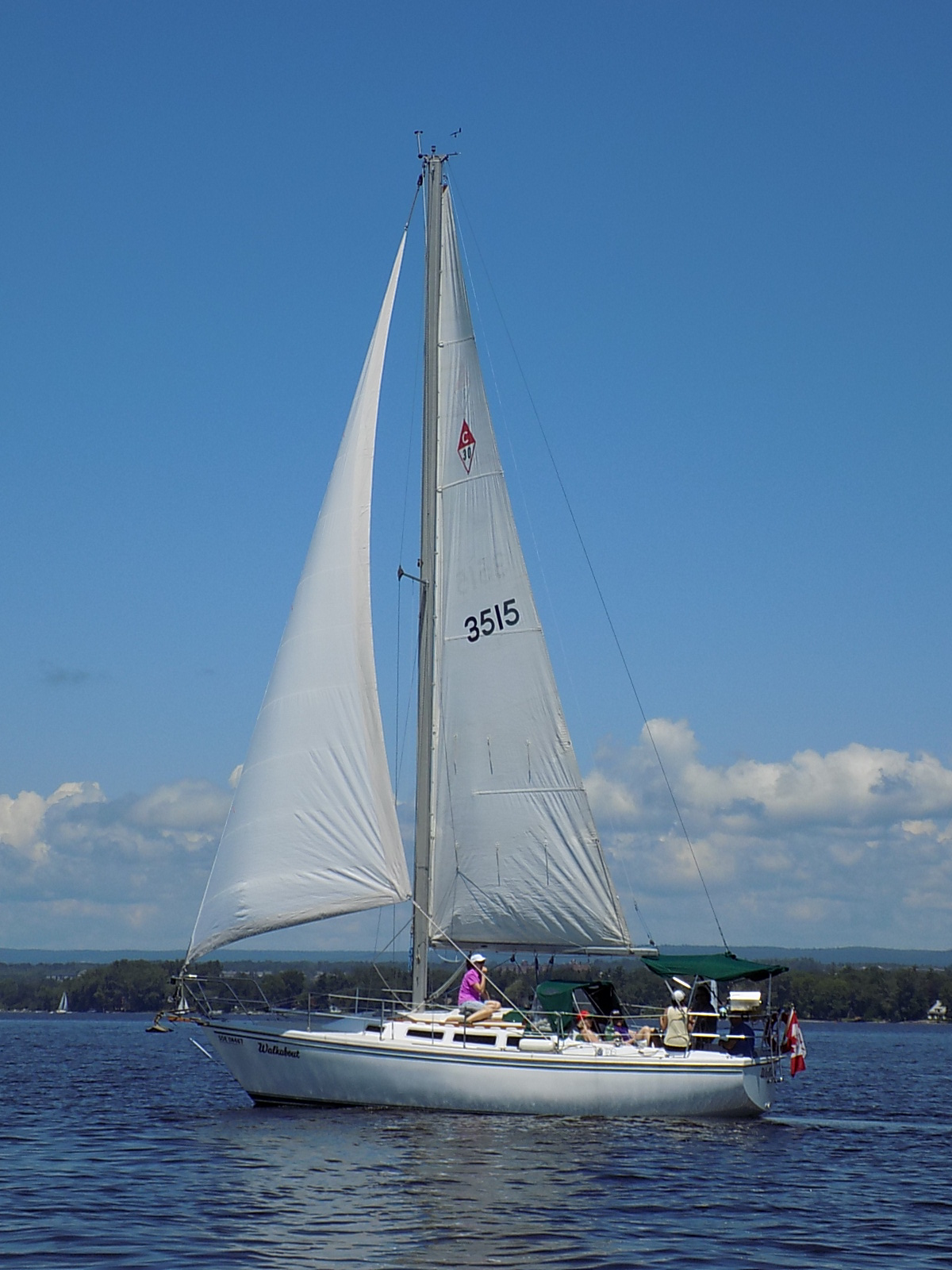
- A Catalina 30 with the optional bowsprit fitted

Development
- Designer: Frank Butler
- Location: United States
- Year: 1974
- No. built: 6430
- Builder: Catalina Yachts
- Name: Catalina 30

Boat
- Displacement: 10,200 lb (4,627 kg)
- Draft: 5.25 ft (1.60 m)

Hull
- Type: Monohull
- Construction: Fiberglass
- LOA: 29.92 ft (9.12 m)
- LWL: 25.00 ft (7.62 m)
- Beam: 10.83 ft (3.30 m)
- Engine: Yanmar or Universal

Hull appendages
- Keel: fin keel
- Ballast: 4,250 lb (1,928 kg)
- Rudder: internally-mounted spade-type rudder

Rig
- General: Masthead sloop
- I foretriangle height: 41.00 ft (12.50 m)
- J foretriangle base: 11.50 ft (3.51 m)
- P mainsail luff: 35.00 ft (10.67 m)
- E mainsail foot: 11.50 ft (3.51 m)

Sails
- Mainsail area: 201.25 sq ft (18.697 m^{2})
- Jib/genoa area: 235.75 sq ft (21.902 m^{2})
- Total sail area: 437.00 sq ft (40.599 m^{2})

The Catalina 30 is a series of recreational keelboats built by Catalina Yachts in the United States. From 1972 to 2008, 6,430 were built.

It has a hull speed of 6.7 kn (12.41 km/h). A tall rig and a bowsprit were optional. In 1990 an open transom was added.

== See also ==
- American Sailboat Hall of Fame

== Gallery ==
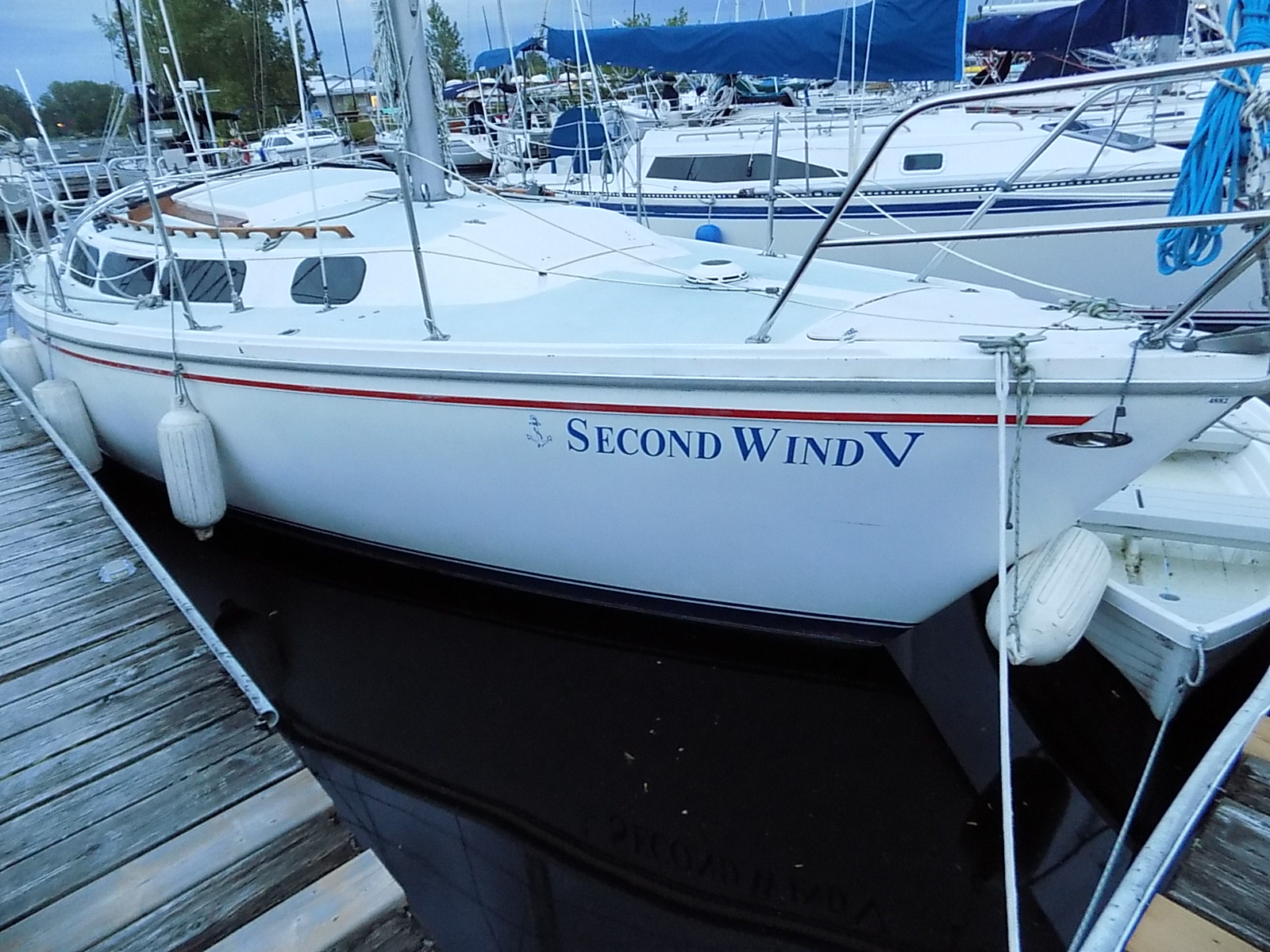

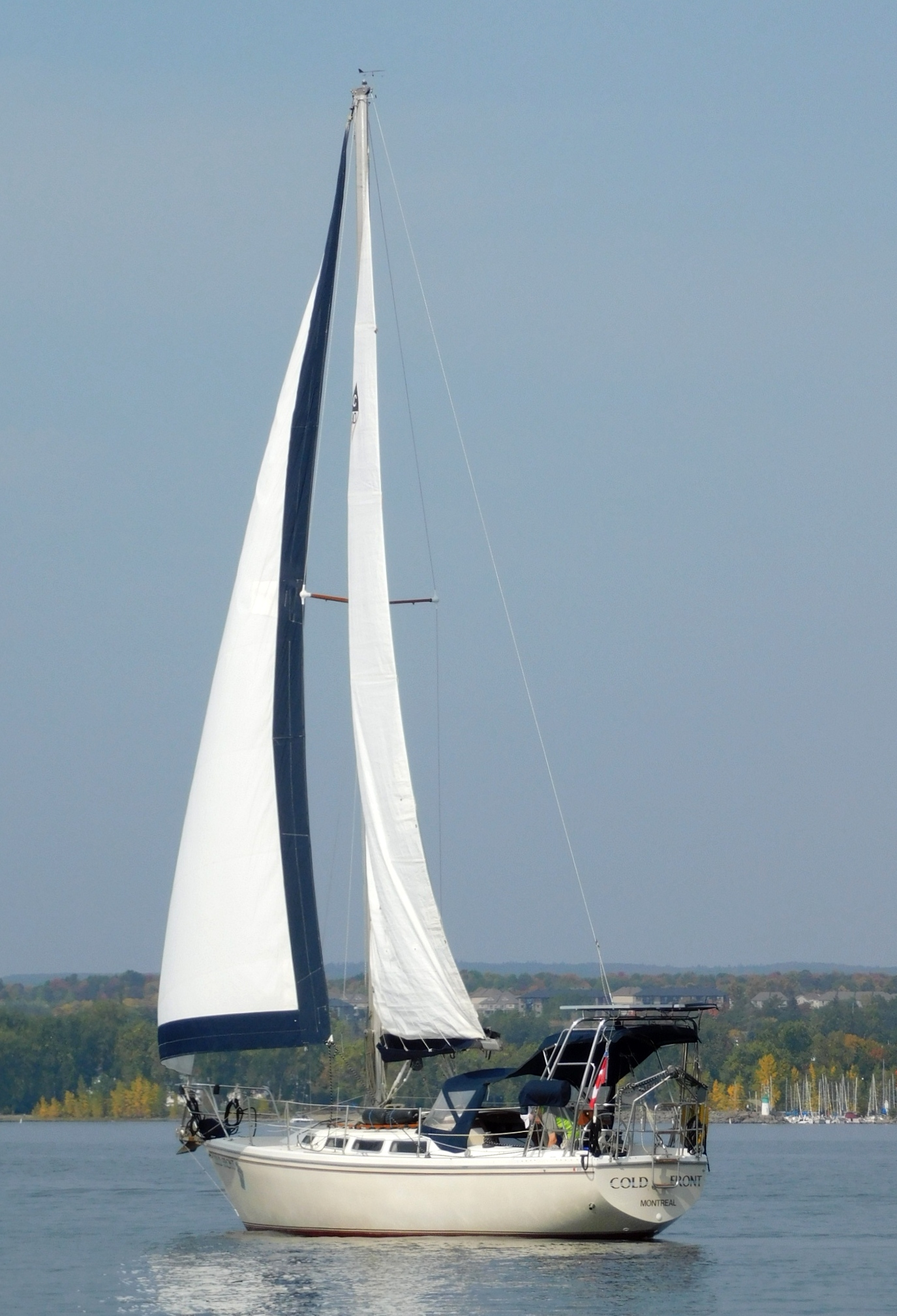
The transom shape

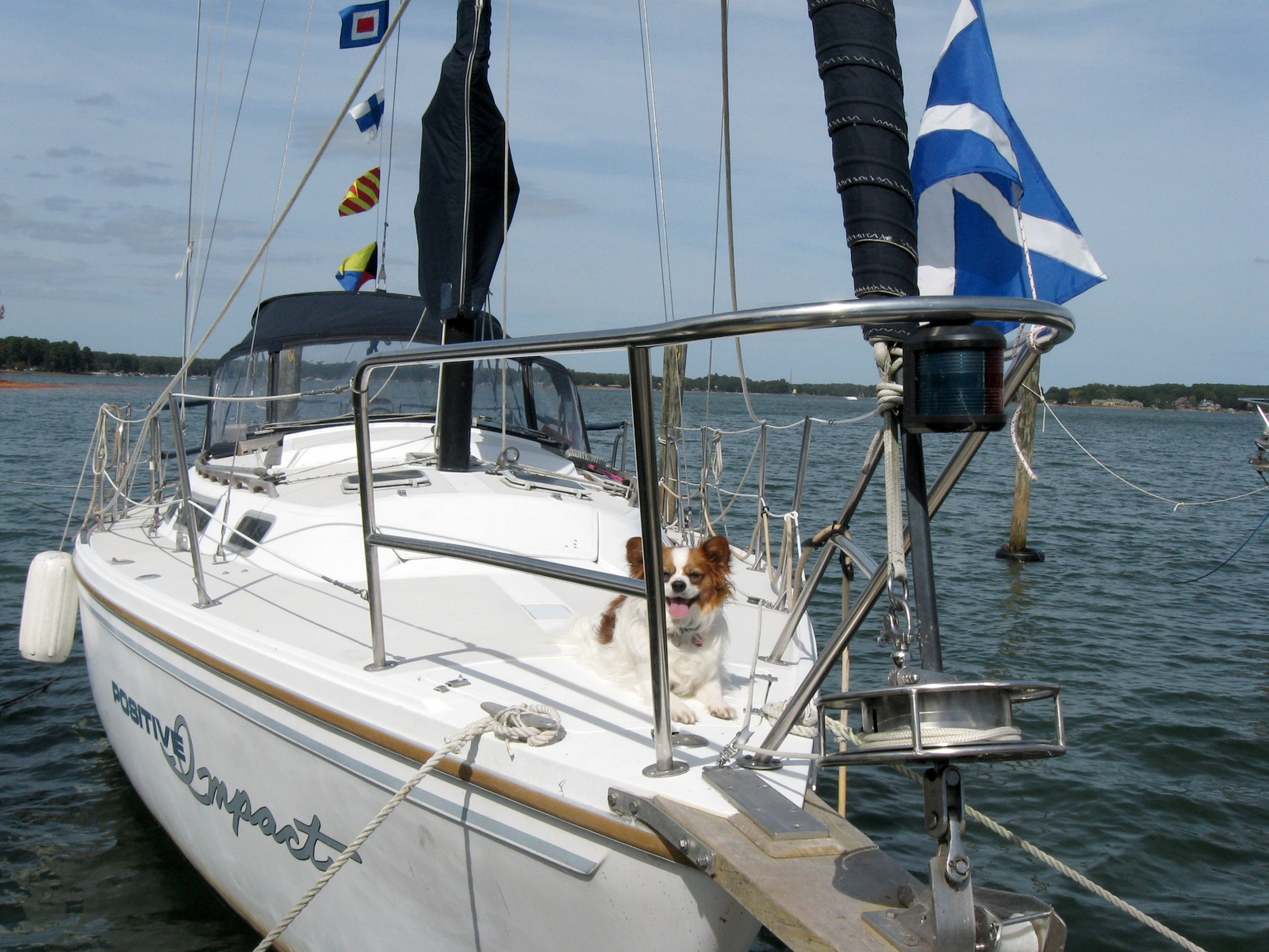
1984 Catalina 30 showing the optional tall rig with bowsprit.
