= Catalina 250 =

Sailboat class

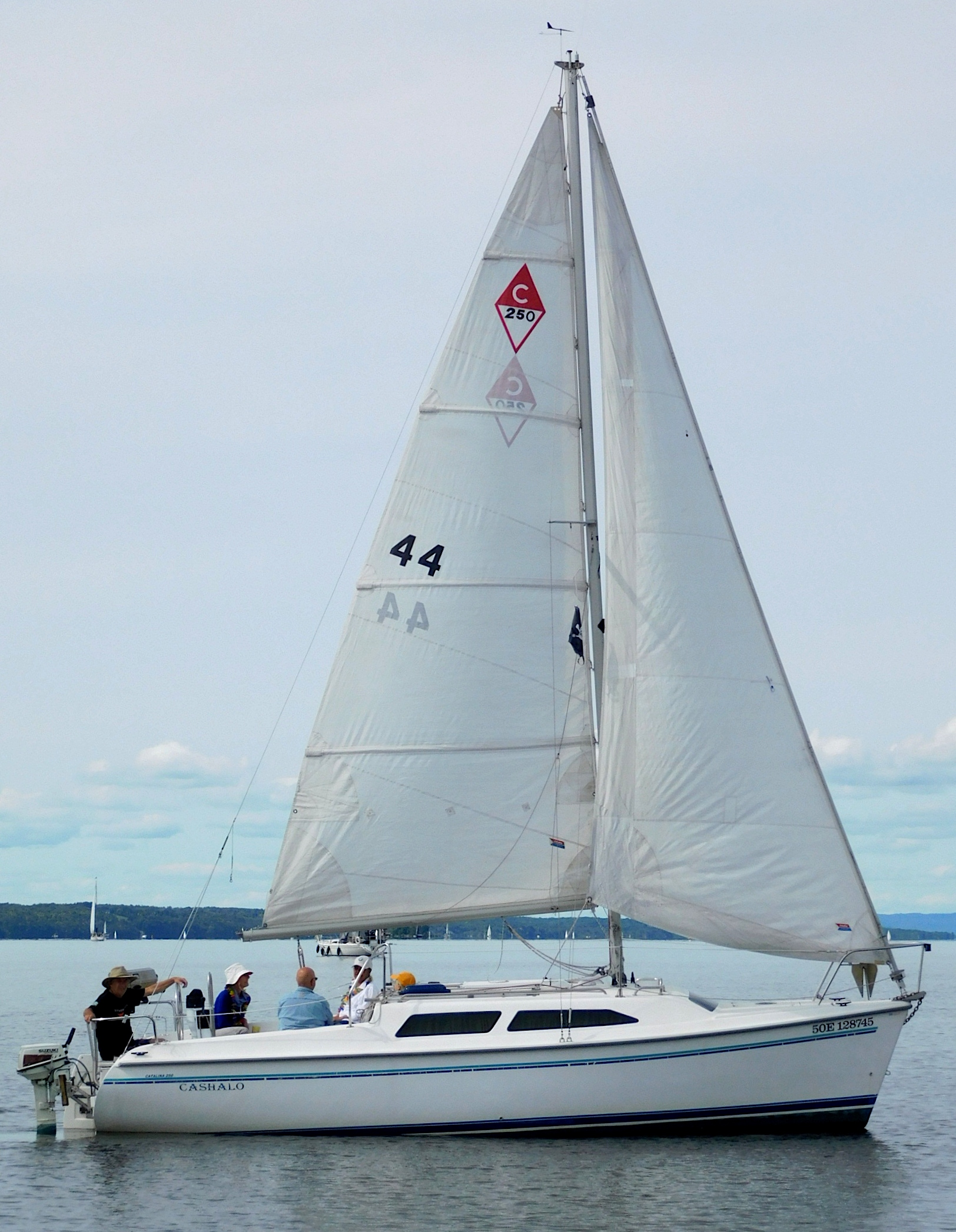

Development
- Designer: Catalina Design Team
- Location: United States
- Year: 1995
- Builder: Catalina Yachts
- Name: Catalina 250

Boat
- Displacement: 4,200 lb (1,905 kg)
- Draft: 5.00 ft (1.52 m)

Hull
- Type: Monohull
- Construction: Fiberglass
- LOA: 25.00 ft (7.62 m)
- LWL: 21.25 ft (6.48 m)
- Beam: 8.50 ft (2.59 m)
- Engine: Outboard motor

Hull appendages
- Keel: fin keel
- Ballast: 1,050 lb (476 kg)
- Rudder: Transom-mounted rudder

Rig
- General: Masthead sloop
- I foretriangle height: 29.00 ft (8.84 m)
- J foretriangle base: 9.00 ft (2.74 m)
- P mainsail luff: 24.50 ft (7.47 m)
- E mainsail foot: 11.00 ft (3.35 m)

Sails
- Mainsail area: 134.75 sq ft (12.519 m^{2})
- Jib/genoa area: 130.50 sq ft (12.124 m^{2})
- Total sail area: 265.25 sq ft (24.643 m^{2})

The Catalina 250 is an American trailerable sailboat, that was designed by the Catalina Design Team and first built in 1995.

== Production ==
The boat was built by Catalina Yachts in the United States starting in 1995, but it is now out of production.

== Design ==
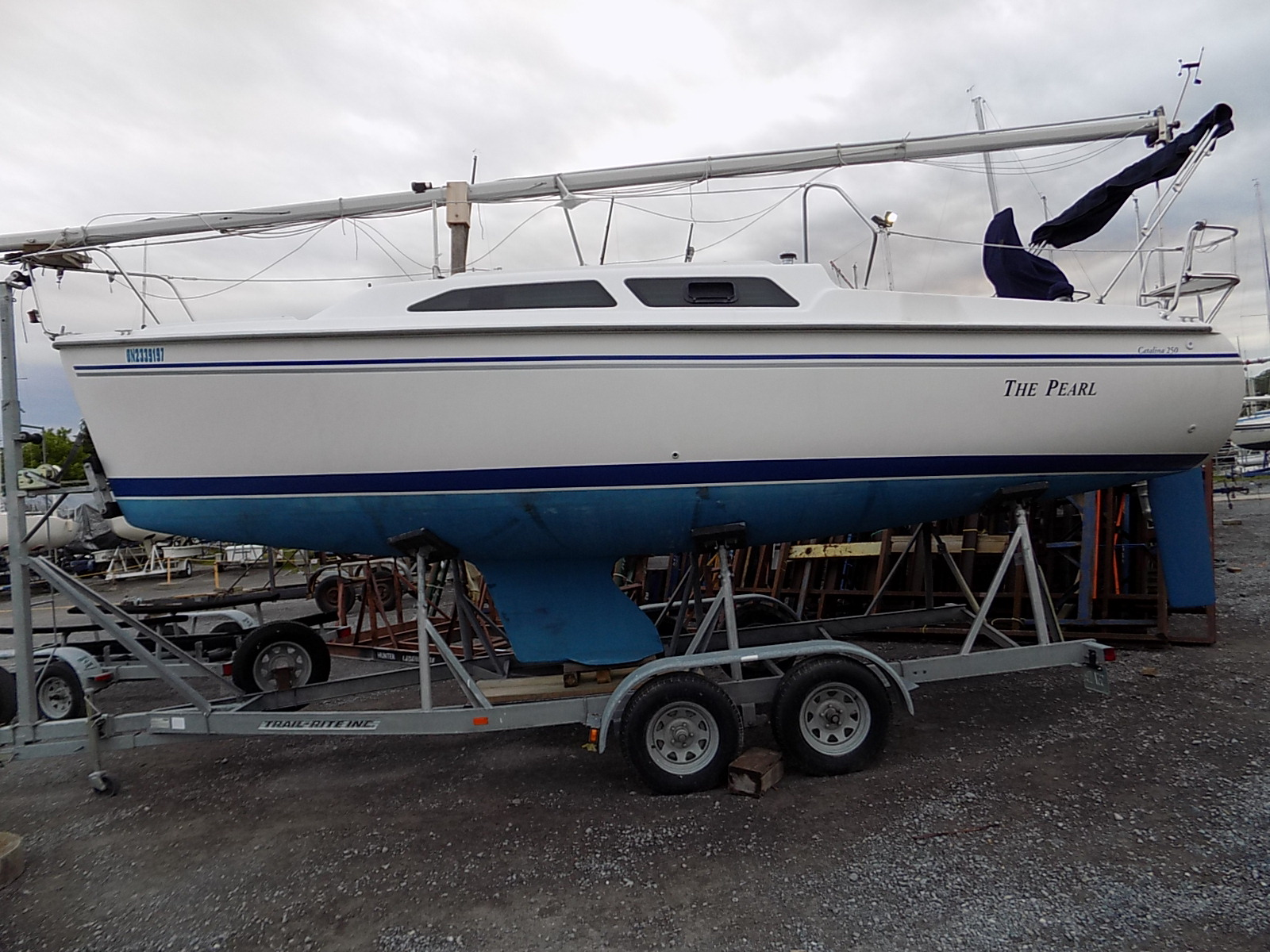
Catalina 250 with wing keel

The Catalina 250 is a small recreational keelboat, built predominantly of fiberglass. It has a masthead sloop rig, a transom-hung rudder and a fixed fin keel, wing keel or centerboard. The fin keel version displaces 4,200 lb (1,905 kg) and carries 1,050 lb (476 kg) of ballast. The centerboard version displaces 3,250 lb (1,474 kg) and also carries 1,200 lb (544 kg) of water ballast in a separate double bottom hull tank.

The boat has a draft of 5.00 ft (1.52 m) with the standard keel and 3.42 ft (1.04 m) with the optional shoal draft wing keel. The centreboard version has a draft of 5.75 ft (1.75 m) with the centreboard extended and 1.67 ft (0.51 m) with it retracted, allowing beaching or ground transportation on a trailer.

The boat is normally fitted with a small outboard motor for docking and maneuvering. The fuel tank holds 6 U.S. gallons (23 L; 5.0 imp gal) and the fresh water tank has a capacity of 5 U.S. gallons (19 L; 4.2 imp gal).

The design has sleeping accommodation for four people, with a double "V"-berth in the bow cabin and two straight settees in the main cabin with a lowering table. The galley is located on the starboard side at the companionway ladder. The galley is equipped with a stove, ice box and a sink. The head is located opposite the galley on the port side and includes a sink. Cabin headroom is 51 in (130 cm).

The wing keel version has a PHRF racing average handicap of 228 with a high of 237 and low of 213. The centerboard and water ballast version has a PHRF racing average handicap of 222 with a high of 228 and low of 216. All versions have a hull speed of 6.18 kn (11.45 km/h).

== Operational history ==
In a 2010 review Steve Henkel wrote, "best features: the wing keel model comes close to being an ideal combination of features and economy for new sailors just starting out and wanting to test the waters. Worst features: The water ballast version has some inherent weaknesses, for example, water is only one eleventh the density of lead, limiting its effectiveness as ballast; since shallow draft is paramount for easy ramp launching, the ballast cannot be as deep as with conventional lead ballast; and to attain enough total weight to be even partially effective, it must be spread out into the ends of the hull, which tends to slow the boat in waves. The bottom line is that water ballast makes for a slower, more tender boat compared to an identical design with a lead keel."

== See also ==
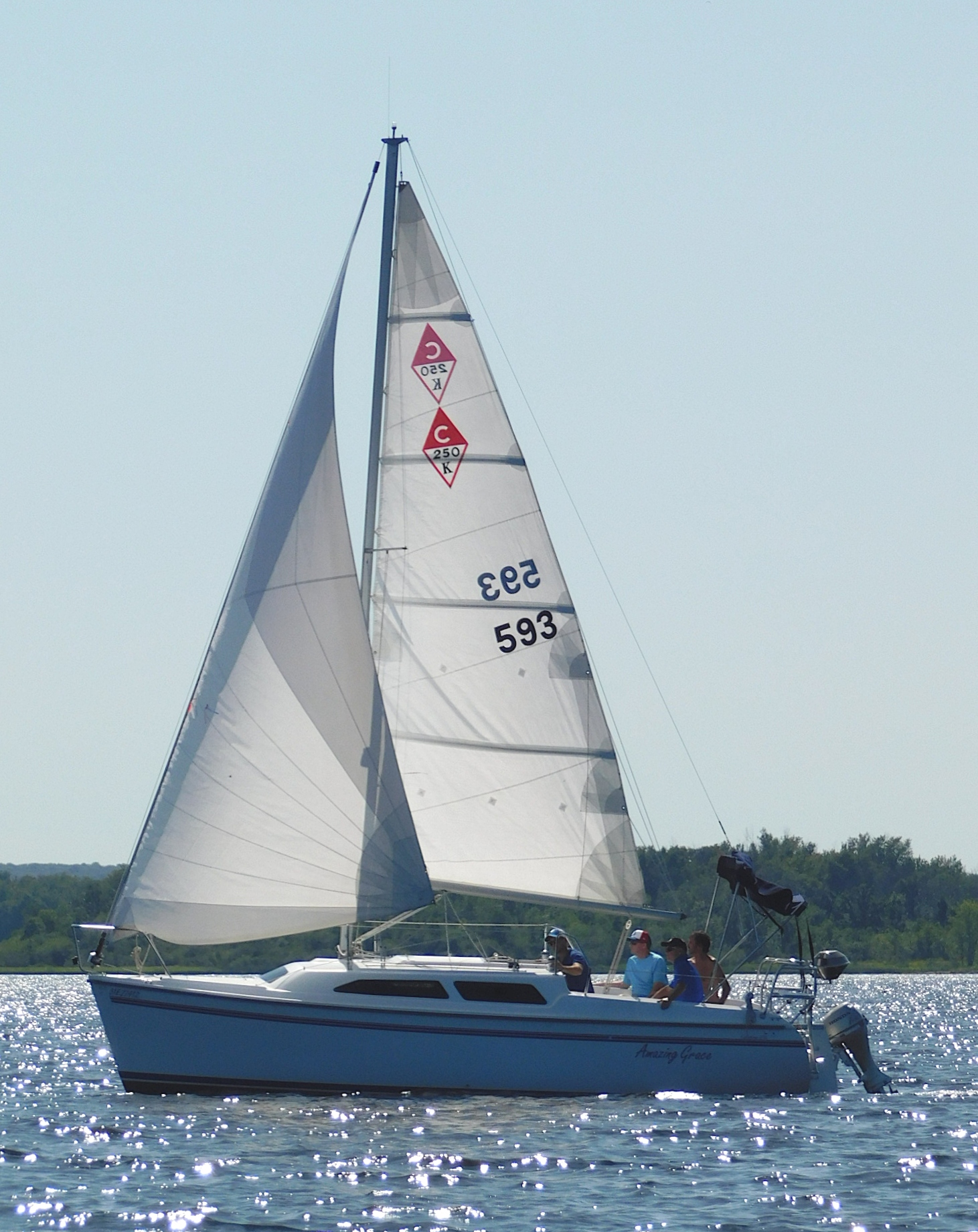
Catalina 250K keel version

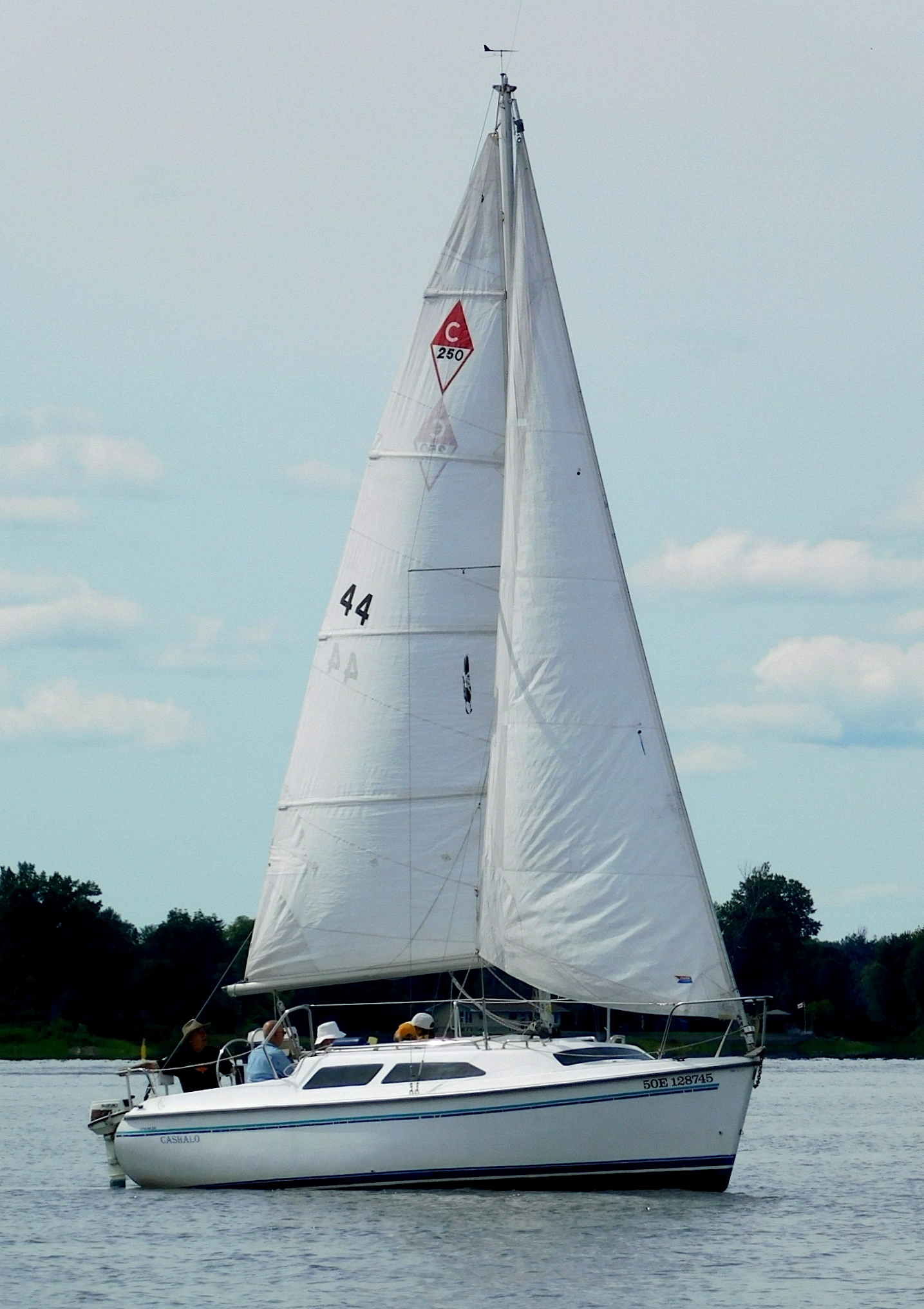
Catalina 250

- List of sailing boat types
