= Catalina 470 =

Sailboat class

Development
- Designer: Gerry Douglas
- Location: United States
- Year: 1998
- Builder: Catalina Yachts
- Name: Catalina 470

Boat
- Displacement: 27,000 lb (12,247 kg)
- Draft: 7.83 ft (2.39 m)

Hull
- Type: Monohull
- Construction: Fiberglass
- LOA: 47.67 ft (14.53 m)
- LWL: 42.00 ft (12.80 m)
- Beam: 14.00 ft (4.27 m)
- Engine: Yanmar 4JHTE diesel engine, 76 hp (57 kW)

Hull appendages
- Keel: fin keel
- Ballast: 8,800 lb (3,992 kg)
- Rudder: internally-mounted spade-type rudder

Rig
- General: Masthead sloop
- I foretriangle height: 58.25 ft (17.75 m)
- J foretriangle base: 17.00 ft (5.18 m)
- P mainsail luff: 51.50 ft (15.70 m)
- E mainsail foot: 20.00 ft (6.10 m)

Sails
- Mainsail area: 515.00 sq ft (47.845 m^{2})
- Jib/genoa area: 495.13 sq ft (45.999 m^{2})
- Total sail area: 1,010.13 sq ft (93.844 m^{2})

The Catalina 470 is an American sailboat, that was designed by Gerry Douglas and first built in 1998.

== Production ==
The boat was built by Catalina Yachts in the United States, starting in 1998. The design is out of production.

== Design ==
The Catalina 470 is a large recreational keelboat, built predominantly of fiberglass. It has a masthead sloop rig, an internally-mounted spade-type rudder and a fixed fin keel. It displaces 27,000 lb (12,247 kg) and carries 8,800 lb (3,992 kg) of ballast.

The boat is fitted with a Japanese Yanmar 4JHTE diesel engine of 76 hp (57 kW). The fuel tank holds 84 U.S. gallons (320 L; 70 imp gal) and the fresh water tank has a capacity of 214 U.S. gallons (810 L; 178 imp gal).

The boat has a hull speed of 8.68 kn (16.08 km/h).

== Variants ==
Catalina 470
Main model with a draft of 7.83 ft (2.39 m).
Catalina 470 SD
Model with a shoal draft wing keel of 5.5 ft (1.7 m).
Catalina 470 TR
Model with a tall rig about 4.42 ft (1.35 m) higher and the mast moved aft.

== See also ==
- List of sailing boat types

Similar sailboats

- Hunter 44
