= Columbia 22 =

Sailboat class

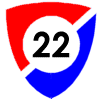

Development
- Designer: William Crealock
- Location: United States
- Year: 1966
- No. built: 1,541
- Builder: Columbia Yachts

Boat
- Displacement: 2,200 lb (998 kg)
- Draft: 3.17 ft (0.97 m)

Hull
- Type: monohull
- Construction: fiberglass
- LOA: 22.00 ft (6.71 m)
- LWL: 20.08 ft (6.12 m)
- Beam: 7.75 ft (2.36 m)
- Engine: outboard motor

Hull appendages
- Keel: fin keel
- Ballast: 1,100 lb (499 kg)
- Rudder: internally-mounted spade-type rudder

Rig
- Rig type: Bermuda rig
- I foretriangle height: 26.56 ft (8.10 m)
- J foretriangle base: 8.38 ft (2.55 m)
- P mainsail luff: 23.50 ft (7.16 m)
- E mainsail foot: 10.25 ft (3.12 m)

Sails
- Sailplan: masthead sloop
- Mainsail area: 120.44 sq ft (11.189 m^{2})
- Jib/genoa area: 111.29 sq ft (10.339 m^{2})
- Total sail area: 231.72 sq ft (21.527 m^{2})

Racing
- PHRF: 186

The Columbia 22 is an American trailerable sailboat that was designed by William Crealock and first built in 1966.

The Columbia 22 design was developed into the Coronado 23, with the addition of a new coach house roof design.

== Production ==
The design was built by Columbia Yachts in the United States from 1966 until 1972, with 1,541 boats completed, but it is now out of production.

A number of boats were sold as kits for amateur construction, under the name of Sailcrafter Custom Yachts.

== Design ==
The Columbia 22 is a recreational keelboat, built predominantly of fiberglass, with wood trim. It has a masthead sloop rig, a slightly raked stem, a nearly-plumb transom, an internally mounted spade-type rudder controlled by a tiller and a fixed fin keel or optional stub keel and centerboard. The stub keel/centerboard model was only produced in small numbers. It displaces 2,200 lb (998 kg) and carries 1,100 lb (499 kg) of cast iron ballast.

Boats built from 1970 and later have different hatch locations and an outboard motor well.

The keel-equipped version of the boat has a draft of 3.17 ft (0.97 m), while the centreboard-equipped version has a draft of 4.83 ft (1.47 m) with the centerboard extended and 2.5 ft (0.76 m) with it retracted, allowing ground transportation on a trailer.

The boat is normally fitted with a small 3 to 6 hp (2 to 4 kW) outboard motor for docking and maneuvering.

The design has sleeping accommodation for four people, with a double "V"-berth in the bow cabin, and two straight settees in the main cabin, one combined with the dinette table. The galley is located on the starboard side just forward of the companionway ladder. The galley is equipped with a stove, ice box and a sink. The optional head is located under the bow cabin "V"-berth. Cabin headroom is 55 in (140 cm).

The design has a PHRF racing average handicap of 186 and a hull speed of 6.0 kn (11.1 km/h).

== Operational history ==
In a 2010 review Steve Henkel wrote, "Over 1,500 of these boats were made over a seven-year period. They were available either in the 3' 2" fixed-keel version shown here, or as a keel/centerboarder (draft board up 2' 6", down 4' 10"). At some point during Columbia Yacht Corporation’s life (between 1961 and 1978), in addition to their regular finished boats, the company sold a line of kit boats under the name Sailcrafter Custom Yachts. As a result, some Columbia 22s on the used market may include such aberrations as no sliding main hatch or no outboard well, the result of a home builder deciding it was too much trouble to complete that part of the kit. Best features: The cast iron keel, if shaped as shown in the inboard profile and properly faired, will add measurably to performance on the race course. The boat's PHRF rating suggests that, with her long waterline and low wetted surface, she will be fast relative to her comp[etitor]s. Worst features: The dinette is less than 30 inches wide, good for seating two but impossible for four. The fin keel and draft of over three feet might give problems at the launch ramp."

== See also ==
- List of sailing boat types
