= Capri 26 =

Sailboat class

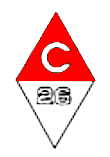

Development
- Designer: Frank W. Butler and Gerry Douglas
- Location: United States
- Year: 1990
- No. built: 320
- Builder: Catalina Yachts

Boat
- Displacement: 5,250 lb (2,381 kg)
- Draft: 4.83 ft (1.47 m)

Hull
- Type: monohull
- Construction: fiberglass
- LOA: 26.16 ft (7.97 m)
- LWL: 22.92 ft (6.99 m)
- Beam: 9.83 ft (3.00 m)
- Engine: inboard two-cylinder diesel engine

Hull appendages
- Keel: fin keel
- Ballast: 1,900 lb (862 kg)
- Rudder: internally-mounted spade-type rudder

Rig
- Rig type: Bermuda rig
- I foretriangle height: 32.90 ft (10.03 m)
- J foretriangle base: 8.70 ft (2.65 m)
- P mainsail luff: 27.80 ft (8.47 m)
- E mainsail foot: 11.00 ft (3.35 m)

Sails
- Sailplan: masthead sloop
- Mainsail area: 152.90 sq ft (14.205 m^{2})
- Jib/genoa area: 143.12 sq ft (13.296 m^{2})
- Total sail area: 296.02 sq ft (27.501 m^{2})

Racing
- PHRF: 210

The Capri 26 is an American trailerable sailboat that was designed by Frank W. Butler and Gerry Douglas as a cruiser-racer and first built in 1990.

== Production ==
The design was built by Catalina Yachts in the United States from 1990 to 1999, with 320 boats completed, but it is now out of production.

== Design ==
The Capri 26 was designed in response to customer feedback from owners of smaller Capri series sailboats. Prospective buyers were looking for a slightly bigger boat with more "large boat" comforts and enough space for a family, while retaining the capability to be road transported by boat trailer.

The Capri 26 is a recreational keelboat, built predominantly of fiberglass, with wooden trim. It has a masthead sloop rig, a raked stem, a walk-through reverse transom, an internally mounted spade-type rudder controlled by a tiller and a fixed fin keel or optional shoal draft, wing keel.

The boat is fitted with a inboard two-cylinder diesel engine for docking and maneuvering. The fuel tank holds 10 U.S. gallons (38 L; 8.3 imp gal) and the fresh water tank has a capacity of 25 U.S. gallons (95 L; 21 imp gal).

The design has sleeping accommodation for four people, with two straight settees which can be joined over the lower-able drop-leaf table in the main cabin and an aft cabin with a large double berth under the cockpit. The galley is located on the starboard side just forward of the companionway ladder. The galley is equipped with a two-burner recessed stove, an ice box and a sink with a pressurized water supply. The spacious head is located just aft of companionway on the port side. Cabin headroom is 73 in (190 cm).

Ventilation is provided by four opening main cabin ports, plus one in the cockpit that provides fresh air to the aft cabin beneath.

The design has a PHRF racing average handicap of 210 and a hull speed of 6.4 kn (11.9 km/h).

== Variants ==
Capri 26 fin keel
Model with a fin keel and a draft of 4.83 ft (1.47 m). It displaces 5,250 lb (2,381 kg) and carries 1,900 lb (862 kg) of ballast.
Capri 26 wing keel
Model with a shoal draft wing keel and a draft of 3.42 ft (1.04 m). It displaces 5,100 lb (2,313 kg) and carries 1,750 lb (794 kg) of ballast.

== Operational history ==
In a 2010 review Steve Henkel wrote, "the Capri 26 (actually 23' 8" on deck because of her sharply raked transom) is full of big-boat features, which might make her desirable to the big-and-tall crowd. Headroom is over six feet, and the beam of almost ten feet allows a humungus double berth in the main cabin—good for a couple sailing without kids or guests, but maybe not so good for overnight parties of four or more. Best features: Cockpit seats are deep and comfortable ... Worst features: The aft berth can feel somewhat constricted to those with claustrophobia. Racing the boat is a good possibility for those of competitive spirit, with her [PHRF] handicap of 210 and max speed of 6.4 [knots] due to her long waterline, but skippers should remember to stow all heavy gear ashore. Though the bow and stern areas might look tempting as stowage areas, for best boat speed they should be kept empty of any heavy gear—and there is no significant stowage area amidships, other than on the cabin sole under the table."

== See also ==
- List of sailing boat types
