= Frank Butler (founder) =

Business entrepreneur

- Frank Butler in 2001.
- Born: Frank Willis Butler; January 17, 1928; Los Angeles County, California, U.S.
- Died: November 15, 2020 (aged 92)
- Known for: Founding of Catalina Yachts, Coronado Yachts, Wesco Marine, and Wesco Tool

Frank Willis Butler (January 17, 1928 – November 15, 2020) was the founder of Catalina Yachts, one of the biggest boat designers and manufacturers in the world.

== The early Wesco years ==
Born in California in 1928, Butler started his career in the Navy, and went to college, but found college difficult and did not graduate. He opened his own machine shop called Wesco Tool, where he experienced great success making airplane parts. In the late 1950s Butler started sailing dinghies, and as his family grew he desired a bigger boat.

He set his sights on the 21' Victory Sloop, designed by naval architect Ted Carpenter and first launched in 1959. He contracted with the boat builder to make him one, but the builder ran out of funds. Butler gave the builder a loan. Unable to repay the debt, the builder gave Butler the tooling to continue building the boat himself. In 1962 after 126 Victory 21 boats were manufactured, Butler bought the rights for the Victory 21 and founded a second company he named Wesco Marine.

== The Coronado years ==
After producing boats under the name of Wesco Marine for a short time, Butler changed the name of the company to Coronado Yachts. Among the first boats built by Coronado were the Victory 21 and the 14' Super Satellite. The first notable boat design by Butler was the Coronado 25, which incorporated his knowledge from his work in the airplane industry.

In 1968 Butler sold Coronado to the Whittaker Corporation, which had divisions in aerospace, metal, chemical, and healthcare, and had already purchased Columbia Yachts from Dick Valdes in 1967. Whittaker had also acquired several power boat manufacturers. Butler worked for Whittaker for one year, and then left due to disagreements with management over the production of a trailerable 22-foot (6.7 m) boat with a movable keel.

Dick Valdes left Whittaker in 1972, and eventually many of the Columbia models became cross-branded with Coronados. In 1974 Whittaker discontinued the Coronado line.

== The Catalina years ==
Butler had a non-competition contract with Whittaker for two years, so his boat building was limited to the smaller ones for which Whittaker hadn't bought the rights. Butler built a marina in Oxnard, California, and founded Catalina Yachts. His first new product was the trailerable 22-foot (6.7 m) Catalina with a movable keel, and he continued to build the smaller boats, such as the Coronado 15, the Omega, the Super Satellite, and the Drifter. Butler's employee and right-hand man, Beattie says, "We wanted to change the name of the Coronado 15 to make it obvious the boat wasn't built by Coronado Yachts, but couldn't because the class association wouldn't let us". Shortly after its founding, Catalina Yachts acquired the manufacturing rights to the Victory 21, and later resumed its production selling the Victory as a Capri Victory 21.

By 1977 Butler had designed and produced three more models: the Catalina 25, Catalina 27, and the Catalina 30. In 1978 Catalina developed the Catalina 38 based on molds for a Sparkman & Stephens racing design purchased from the bankrupt Yankee Yacht Company. Butler redesigned the interior, moved the rudder, and gave it a "Catalina deck", a taller mast, and a shorter boom.

== The Capri, Morgan, Prindle, Islander, and Pearson years ==
The Capri line of sailboats, developed under the Capri Sailboat Division, are the performance-oriented daysailers of Catalina. The Capri models range from 8 to 30 feet (2.4 to 9.1 m).

In 1984 Catalina expanded their manufacturing capabilities by acquiring Morgan Yachts, of which Catalina continues to use the brand name for the Catalina Morgan 440 introduced in 2004.

The other lines produced by Catalina are the Nacra and Prindle catamarans, and the Islander 34 – a powerboat made from a mold purchased from Pearson when it went out of business. Most recently, Catalina acquired the tooling and rights to build the True North line of traditional, Downeast-style power boats. The redesigned True North 34 was introduced at the Miami International Boat Show in February 2020.

Wesco Marine is currently held as a separate entity which provides rigging hardware to Catalina Yachts.

== Catalina today ==
Catalina Yachts is one of the largest boat manufacturers in the world, with over 60,000 boats manufactured to date, more than 120 employees, and about 500,000 square feet (46,000 m^{2}) of manufacturing space. Catalina produces its boats in its Florida manufacturing facility.

=== Boats designed ===
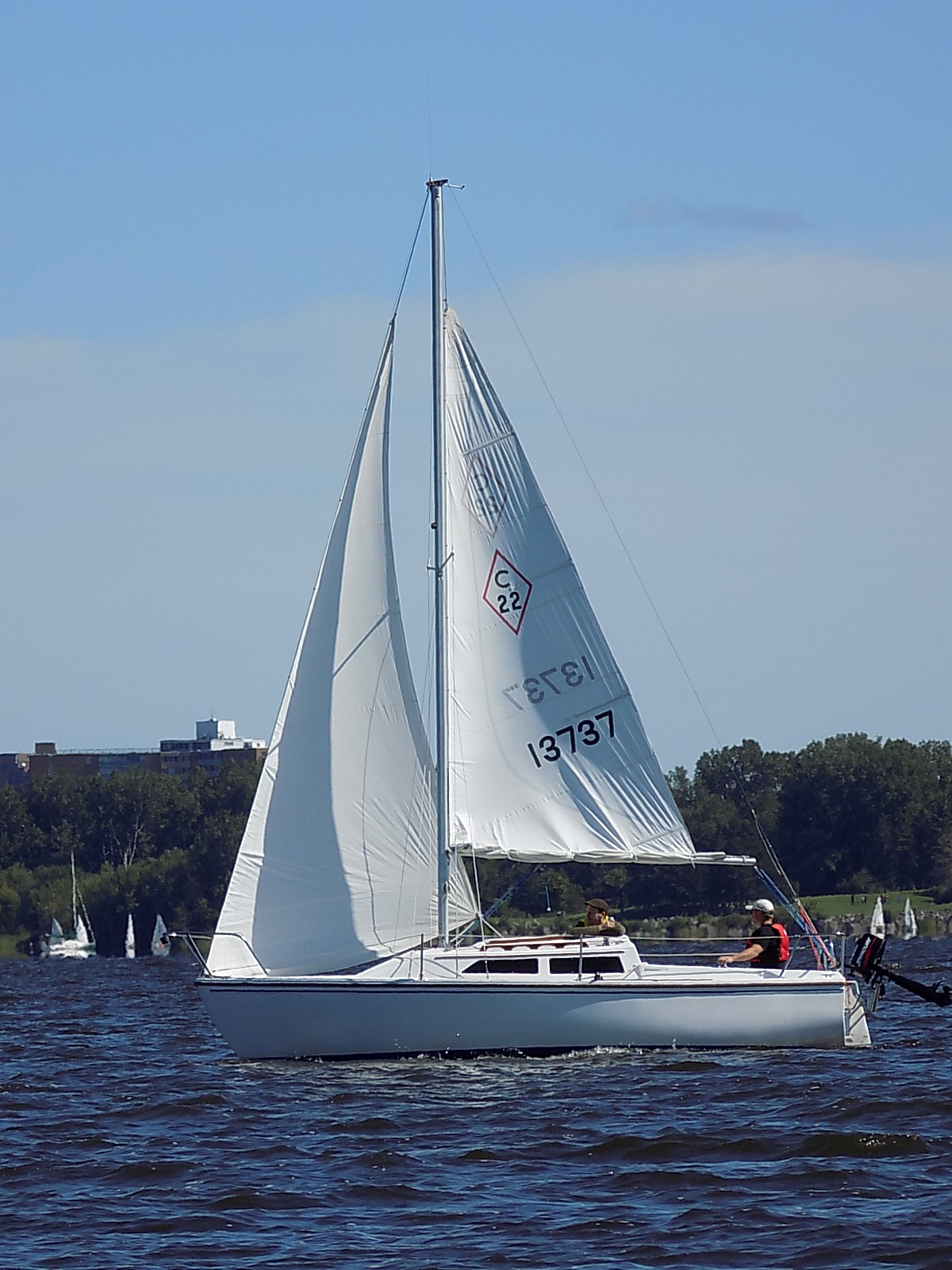
The Butler-designed Catalina 22

- Capri 16
- Capri 22
- Capri 25
- Capri 26
- Capri Cyclone
- Catalina 18
- Catalina 22
- Catalina 25
- Catalina 27
- Catalina 30
- Catalina 34
- Catalina 36
- Coronado 15
- Coronado 25

== Death ==
Butler died on November 15, 2020, in Westlake Village, California, following a brief illness.
