= Catalina 25 =

Sailboat class

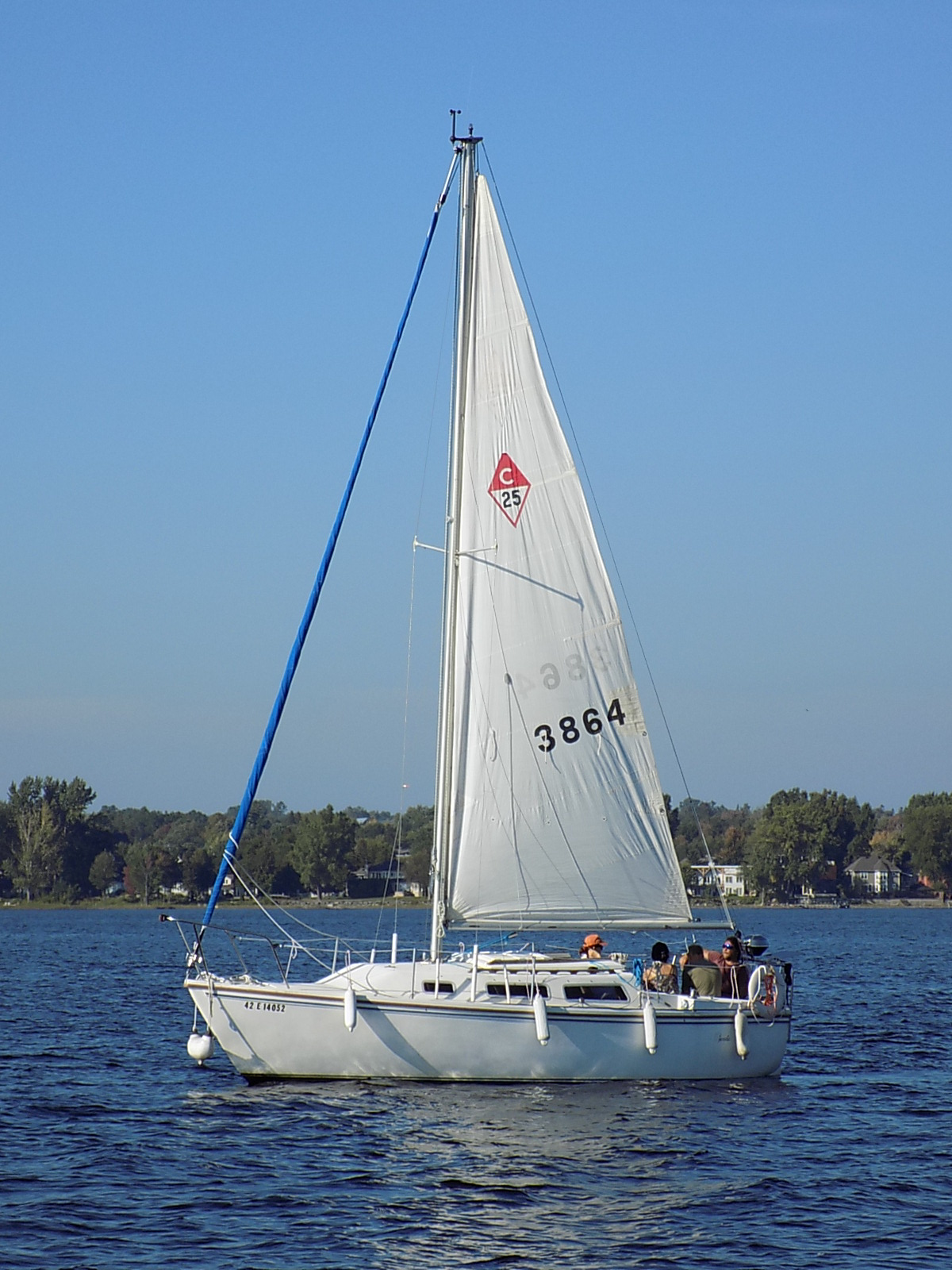

Development
- Designer: Frank Butler
- Location: United States
- Year: 1978
- No. built: 5866
- Builder: Catalina Yachts
- Name: Catalina 25

Boat
- Displacement: 4,550 lb (2,064 kg)
- Draft: 4.00 ft (1.22 m)

Hull
- Type: Monohull
- Construction: Fiberglass
- LOA: 25.00 ft (7.62 m)
- LWL: 22.17 ft (6.76 m)
- Beam: 8.00 ft (2.44 m)
- Engine: Outboard motor

Hull appendages
- Keel: fin, wing, or swing keel
- Ballast: 1,900 lb (862 kg)
- Rudder: transom-mounted rudder

Rig
- General: Masthead sloop
- I foretriangle height: 29.00 ft (8.84 m)
- J foretriangle base: 10.50 ft (3.20 m)
- P mainsail luff: 24.66 ft (7.52 m)
- E mainsail foot: 9.58 ft (2.92 m)

Sails
- Mainsail area: 118.12 sq ft (10.974 m^{2})
- Jib/genoa area: 152.25 sq ft (14.144 m^{2})
- Total sail area: 270.37 sq ft (25.118 m^{2})

Racing
- PHRF: 225

The Catalina 25 is an American trailerable sailboat, that was designed by Frank Butler and first built in 1978.

== Production ==
The boat was built by Catalina Yachts in the United States, between 1978 and 1994. It is the most popular sailboat in this size range ever built in the US with 5866 examples completed.

== Design ==
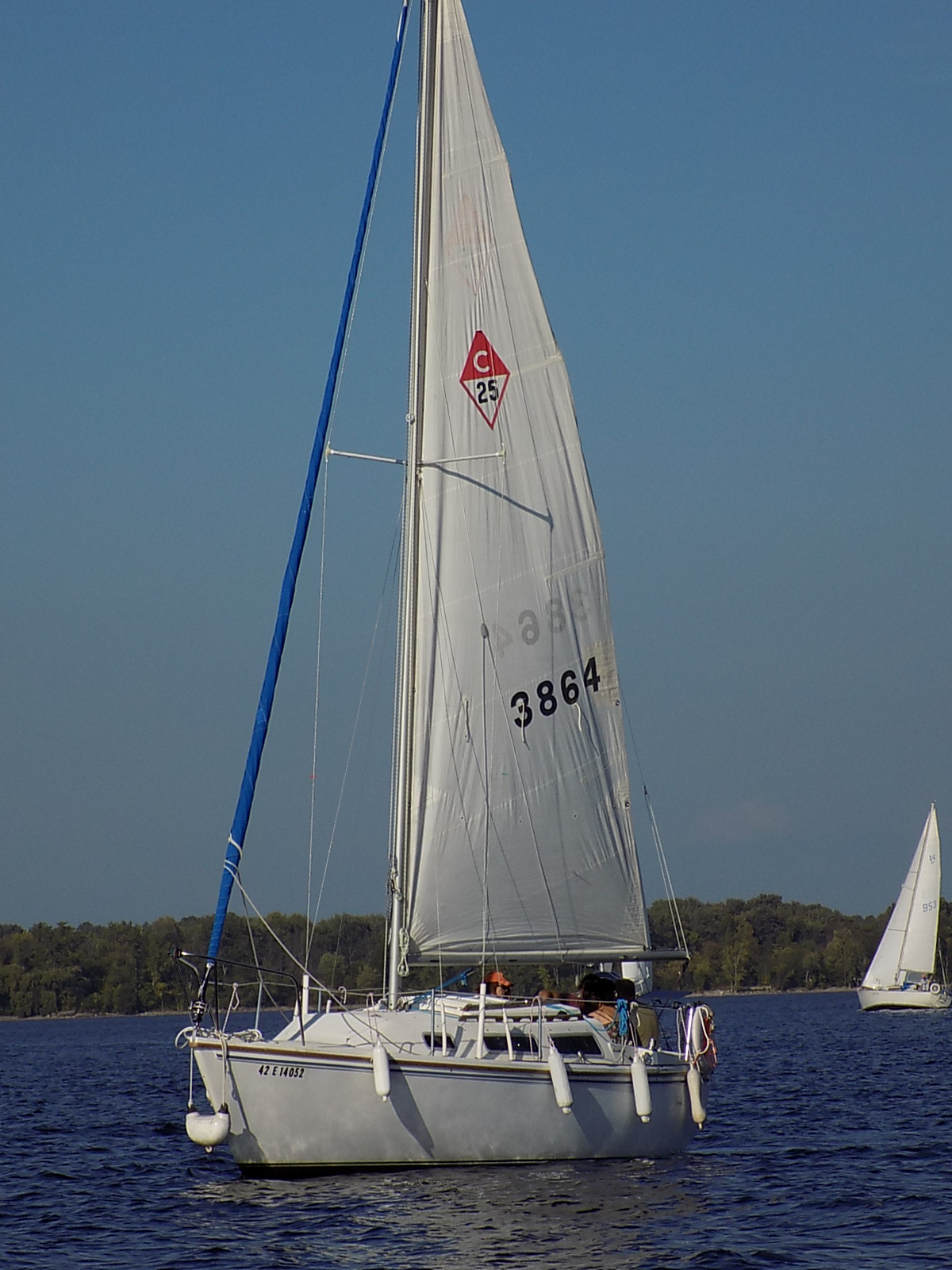
Catalina 25 with jib roller furled.

The Catalina 25 is a small recreational keelboat built predominantly of fiberglass with wood for structural support and trim. It has a masthead sloop rig, a transom-hung rudder, and a fixed fin keel, fixed winged keel, or swing keel.

The fin keel model has a displacement of 4,550 lb (2,064 kg) and carries 1,900 lb (862 kg) of ballast. The wing keel version has a displacement of 4,400 lb (1,996 kg) and carries 1,750 lb (794 kg) of ballast. The swing keel version has a displacement of 4,150 lb (1,882 kg) and carries 1,500 lb (680 kg) of ballast.

The boat has a draft of 4.00 ft (1.22 m) with the standard keel fitted and 2.83 ft (0.86 m) with the optional wing keel. The swing keel version has a draft of 5.00 ft (1.52 m) with the keel extended and 2.66 ft (0.81 m) with the keel retracted into the keel slot, which allows operation in shallow water and easier ground transportation on a trailer.

There is also a tall rig version with a mast about 2.00 ft (0.61 m) higher.

Internal accommodations have two layouts, one with a "traditional" double settee and fold-down table, and the other a "dinette" table arrangement. There is a forward "V" berth and a double berth under the cockpit. The galley is located on the port side just forward of the companionway ladder. The galley is equipped with a stove, ice box and a sink. The head is located just aft of the bow cabin and includes a sink. Cabin headroom is 66 in (170 cm).

The boat is normally fitted with an outboard motor of 4 to 9.9 hp (3 to 7 kW) for docking and maneuvering. The higher horsepower outboard is useful for motoring in a current or offshore. A few of the later models were offered with inboards.

The design has a PHRF racing average handicap of 225 and a hull speed of 6.3 kn (11.7 km/h).

== Operational history ==
In a 2010 review Steve Henkel wrote, "best features: One of the best things about owning a popular boat like the Catalina 25 is the automatic chance to make new friends among the thousands of existing C25 owners. Among the reasons for the boat's phenomenal popularity was her low first cost, whether new or used. Worst feature: Construction quality over the years varied from poor to very good. Among mechanical problems, boats with swing keels tended to require more than average maintenance."

A 2016 review by Darrell Nicholson of Practical Sailor, concluded, "new or unseasoned sailors making their first or second foray into the boat-buying game may find that the Catalina 25 is an attractive choice. The boat is relatively easy to handle, can be single-handed without too much trouble, and while not fast in the racing sense, is fast enough to satisfy many cruisers."

== See also ==
- List of sailing boat types
