= Capri 16 =

Sailboat class

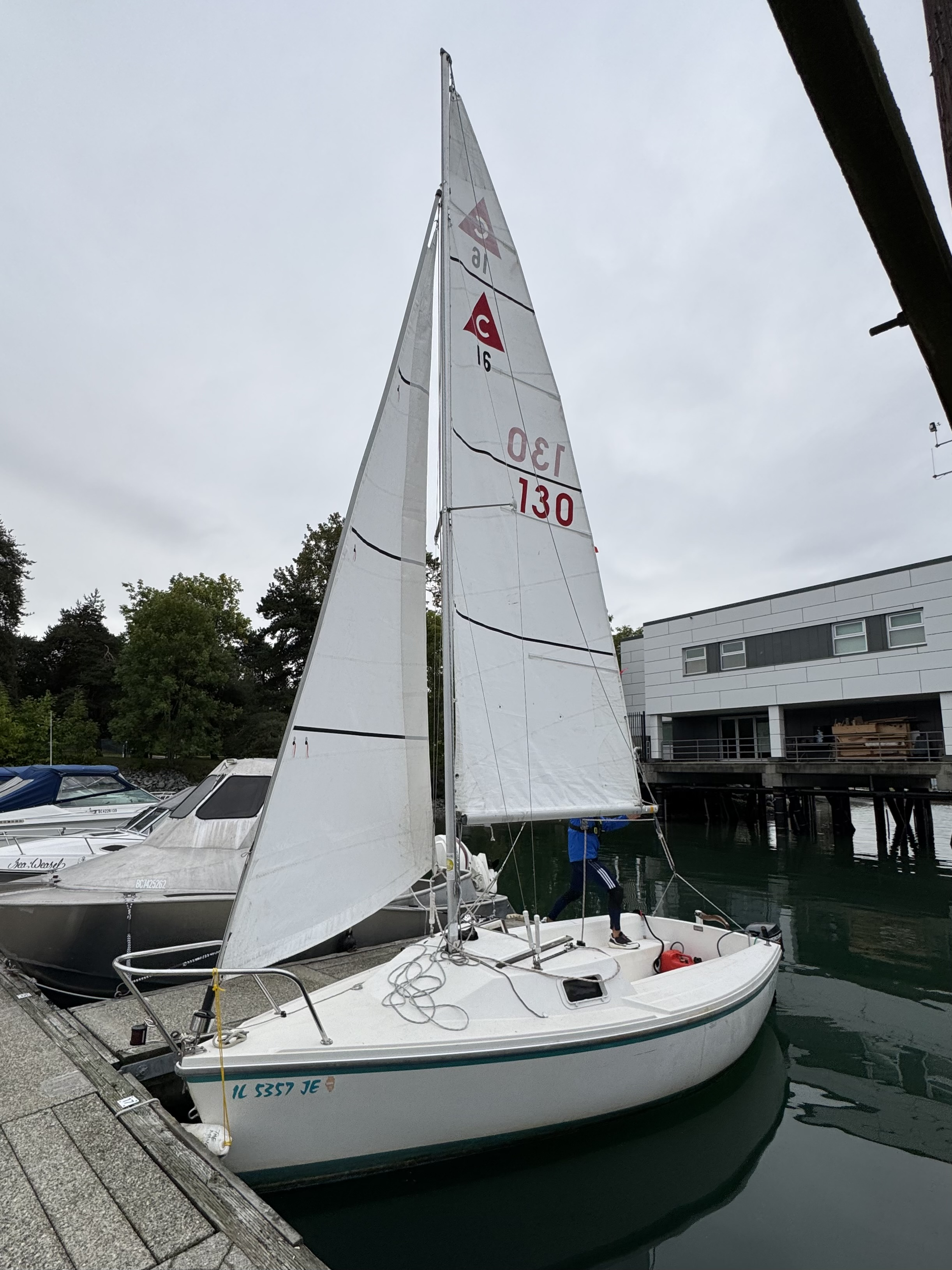
- 1995 Capri 16

Development
- Designer: Frank W. Butler
- Location: United States
- Year: 1987
- No. built: 500
- Builder: Catalina Yachts
- Role: Cruiser

Boat
- Displacement: 1,350 lb (612 kg)
- Draft: 2.42 ft (0.74 m)

Hull
- Type: monohull
- Construction: fiberglass
- LOA: 16.5 ft (5.0 m)
- LWL: 15.5 ft (4.7 m)
- Beam: 6.92 ft (2.11 m)
- Engine: outboard motor

Hull appendages
- Keel: wing keel
- Ballast: 425 lb (193 kg)
- Rudder: transom-mounted rudder

Rig
- Rig type: Bermuda rig
- I foretriangle height: 19.00 ft (5.79 m)
- J foretriangle base: 5.42 ft (1.65 m)
- P mainsail luff: 19.58 ft (5.97 m)
- E mainsail foot: 8.83 ft (2.69 m)

Sails
- Sailplan: fractional rigged sloop
- Mainsail area: 86.45 sq ft (8.031 m^{2})
- Jib/genoa area: 51.49 sq ft (4.784 m^{2})
- Total sail area: 138 sq ft (12.8 m^{2})

The Capri 16, also called the Catalina 16, is an American trailerable sailboat that was designed by Frank W. Butler as a pocket cruiser and first built in 1987.

== Production ==
The design was built by Catalina Yachts in the United States from 1987 to 2005 with 500 boats completed, but it is now out of production.

== Design ==
The Capri 16 is a recreational keelboat, built predominantly of fiberglass, with teak wood trim. It has a fractional sloop rig, a raked stem, a plumb transom, a transom-hung rudder controlled by a tiller and a fixed wing keel. It displaces 1,350 lb (612 kg) and carries 425 lb (193 kg) of ballast.

The boat has a draft of 2.42 ft (0.74 m) with the standard wing keel.

The boat is normally fitted with a small 3 to 6 hp (2 to 4 kW) outboard motor for docking and maneuvering.

The design has sleeping accommodation for two people, with two long, straight settees in the main cabin. There is a space for an ice box and stowage in the forepeak. The head is a portable type, located just aft of the companionway ladder. Cabin headroom is 42 in (110 cm).

The design has a hull speed of 5.3 kn (9.8 km/h).

== Operational history ==
In a 2010 review Steve Henkel wrote, "as sailboats of this size go, the cockpit is larger and the cabin is smaller than average. The 425-pound wing keel is intended to combine shallow (2' 5") draft for gunkholing with reasonable windward performance—although this puts draft near the upper limit for convenient trailering. This might make a good first boat for a young couple. Best features: ... Construction is simple but neat, and adequate for this size and type of craft. The boat seems well designed and the sailplan looks manageable and efficient, though perhaps on the small side for really spritely performance. Worst features: Compared with her competitors, the Capri 16 has less headroom (though her storage space below is about at the average of her competitors). On the other hand, after all, she’s only intended to be a weekender; and her two berths are long enough for the tallest sailors."

== See also ==
- List of sailing boat types
