= Catalina Yachts =

American sailboat builder

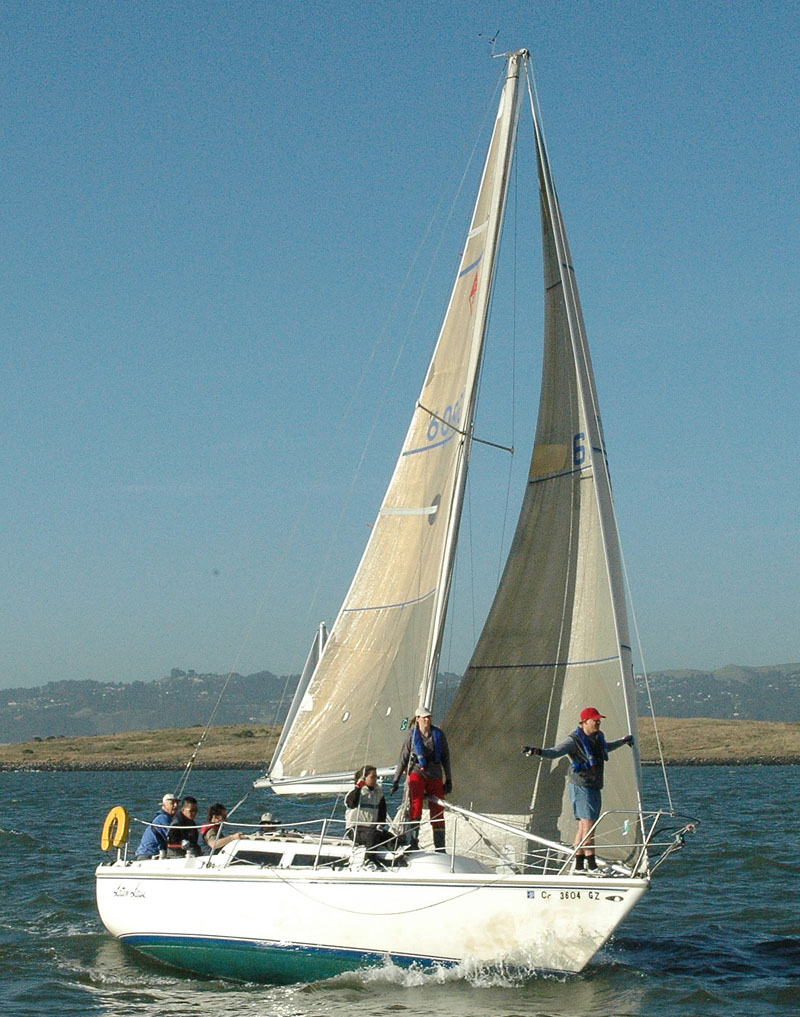
Catalina 27 racing on San Francisco Bay.

Catalina Yachts is a U.S.-based builder of fiberglass monohull sloop-rigged sailboats ranging in sizes from eight to 54 feet in length. It was founded in 1969 in Hollywood, California by Frank Butler . Catalina Yachts is one of the largest boat manufacturers in the world, with over 80,000 boats manufactured to date. Though Catalina produces boats from as small as eight feet under their Capri nameplate, the company is best known for its production of mid-sized cruisers.

== History ==
In 1961, Catalina Yachts founder Frank Butler (January 17, 1928 - November 15, 2020) took over the production of his own boat when his original boat builder ran out of funds and borrowed money from Frank; unable to repay the debt, the builder instead gave Frank the tooling to continue building the boat. Frank ended up taking control of the company, renaming it Wesco Marine and later Coronado Yachts. Many early Coronado 25 boats have the Wesco Marine nameplate on the transom.

Among the first models built by Coronado were the Victory 21 and the Super Satellite. In 1964, the Coronado '25 was produced, becoming the first boat with a one piece interior, making the boat stronger, lighter, and less expensive than previous models. By 1969 the Coronado 27 and 30 foot models were being produced. In 1969, Frank sold Coronado to the Whittaker Corporation which had already acquired Columbia Yachts; Whittaker continued the Coronado line until 1974 producing the Coronado 34 with the center cockpit models 35 and 41. Frank remained with Whitaker for only one year then left to begin Catalina Yachts.

The first model built by Catalina Yachts was a 22-foot design previously rejected by Columbia. By 1977, Frank had designed and produced three more models: the Catalina 25, Catalina 27, and the Catalina 30. The Catalina 22 and the Catalina 30 were both inducted into the now-defunct Sail America American Sailboat Hall of Fame in 1995 and 2001 respectively.

In 1978 Catalina developed the Catalina 38 based on molds for a Sparkman & Stephens racing design purchased from the bankrupt Yankee Yacht Company. Frank redesigned the interior, he gave it a "Catalina deck", a taller mast, a shorter boom, and moved the rudder.

In 1984, Catalina acquired Morgan Yachts and introduced the Catalina Morgan 440 in 2004, now discontinued. The other Morgan models, including the Catalina designed M381 and M45 center cockpit, were recently retired as well.

=== Acquisition, default, and liquidation (2025–2026) ===
In April 2025, Catalina Yachts was acquired by Michael Reardon, founder of Daedalus Yachts, under a provisional asset purchase agreement. Following the acquisition, Sharon Day retired from the company and Patrick Turner was appointed president. Concurrently, the sale sparked an internal civil lawsuit filed in California federal court between members of the Butler estate and legacy company executives over the handling of corporate assets.

Within months of the purchase, Reardon defaulted on the $1 million promissory note, $1.425 million in outstanding corporate payables, and rental payments for the manufacturing facility in Largo, Florida, which was still owned by the Butler family. In early October 2025, management publicly announced a "temporary production pause" citing short-term financial challenges. However, the facility was completely locked down after a Pinellas County court granted an eviction notice against Reardon on October 22, 2025, following a breach-of-lease lawsuit filed by the sellers.

The closure left the workforce abruptly unemployed and without pay; in February 2026, the Pinellas County Office of Human Rights found Reardon's holding company guilty of wage theft, ordering double financial compensation to affected workers. On January 30, 2026, a Florida Superior Court judge entered a $1 million default judgment against Reardon for the failed asset purchase.

To recover financial losses resulting from the default, the Butler family announced the total liquidation of the factory's contents in May 2026. On June 9, 2026, the brand's remaining physical assets, manufacturing tooling, and unfinished hulls were sold piecemeal at a public auction, marking the end of the company's 57-year history.

Cruising World "Boat of the Year" winners

- 2019 - Catalina 545
- 2017 - Catalina 425
- 2014 – Catalina 275 Sport
- 2013 – Catalina 315
- 2012 – Catalina 385
- 2011 – Catalina 355
- 2010 – Catalina 445
- 2009 – Catalina 375
- 2007 – Catalina 309
- 2004 – Catalina 440
- 2001 – Catalina 390
- 1999 – Catalina 310
- 1997 – Catalina 380
- 1996 – Catalina 28 Mark II
- 1995 – Catalina 36 Mark II
- 1992 – Catalina 270

== Catalina Models ==
Model name	Notes	PHRF handicap
Catalina 14.2	Derived from Catalina's Omega 14; introduced in 1983, Mod 2 in 1990, Mod 3 in 1996	
Catalina EXPO 14.2		
Catalina 16	Introduced in 1987 as the Capri 16 and produced until 2005	
Catalina 16.5	Introduced in 1994 as the Capri 16.5	
Catalina Capri 18	Introduced in 1985 as Capri 18, name changed to Catalina 18 for 2000 model. Only Catalina cabin model with full positive flotation.	
Catalina 22	The first and longest running model	267(FK), 270(SK), 273(WK)
Catalina Capri 22	Introduced in 1984	201
Catalina 25	Introduced in 1978	222
Catalina 250	Successor to the 25, introduced in 1995	198
Catalina Capri 26	Introduced in 1990.	210
Catalina 27	Introduced in 1971.	204
Catalina 270	Introduced in 1992.	204
Catalina 275 Sport	Introduced in 2013.	
Catalina 28	Introduced in 1992, updated version MKII in 1995.	192
Catalina 30	Introduced in 1972, discontinued in 2008	177
Catalina 309	Introduced in 2006 to replace the Catalina 30, shares hull with C310. Discontinued in 2012 when it was replaced by the Catalina 315	
Catalina 310	Introduced in 1999.	300
Catalina 315	Introduced in 2012	
Catalina 320	Introduced in 1993, 1,175 hulls, discontinued 2008.	156
Catalina 34	Introduced in 1986, 1,800 hulls, discontinued late 2008, available by special order	147
Catalina 350	Introduced in 2002, the 350 MKII was introduced in 2007 and was discontinued in 2009. Replaced by the 355.	132
Catalina 355	Introduced in 2011	
Catalina 36	Introduced in 1982, 2305 hulls, final hull completed in Nov of 2006. Replaced by the 375.	141
Catalina 37	Limited production racing boat, specifically designed to replace the C38 in the Congressional Cup hosted by LBYC (LBYC.org) and the Long Beach Sailing Foundation (LBYCSF.org)	
Catalina 375	Introduced in 2008 as a replacement for the Catalina 36. The C375 has a broader beam by 8 inches, it is 1.33 feet shorter in length (overall) and a has longer water line than the Catalina 387. It is heavier than the Catalina 36, but lighter than the Catalina 387. Discontinued in 2012.	84
Catalina 38	Introduced in 1977, modified from a Sparkman & Stephens race design	117
Morgan 381	Introduced in 1993, the first Morgan design after Catalina bought Morgan	126
Catalina 380	Introduced in 1996, is a Morgan 381 modified to a rear cockpit - no similarity to the C38. An updated version MKII was released around 1999/2000.	120
Catalina 385	Introduced in 2012. The C385 replaced the C387 and is almost a foot shorter in overall length and 9 inches wider in the beam than the C387, but has a similar weight to the C36 and C375.	
Catalina 387	introduced in Jan 2003 and stopped production in 2009 after 151 C387's were built. The 387 is a modified 380, which replaced the C380 and C390 boats. The 387 is a superior cruising and performance boat, but production was stopped in 2009 due to the down turn in the economy in 2008. The C387 was eventually replaced with the C385 which was smaller, lighter and cheaper to build, but was considered a new design.	120 Wing Keel, 111 Fin keel
Catalina 390	Introduced in 2001 and is identical to the C380, but the rear stateroom was divided into two small cabins (same hull, deck, & rig).	120
Catalina 400	Introduced in 1995. Discontinued in 2012.	102
Catalina 42	Introduced in 1989, more than 1,000 built; production discontinued in 2011.	102
Catalina 425	Introduced in 2016.	
Catalina Morgan 440	Introduced in 2004, is a radical departure from previous Catalina designs.	
Catalina 445	Introduced in 2009; the first of the 5 Series	105
Morgan 45	Introduced in 1991. Discontinued in 2004.	168
Catalina 470	Introduced in 1998.	90
Catalina 50	Introduced in 2001. Discontinued in 2004.	
Catalina 545	Introduced 2019, delayed due to worldwide shortages	
