= Sun Fast 1/2 Ton =

Sailboat class

Development
- Designer: Tony Castro
- Location: France
- Year: 1984
- No. built: 10
- Builder: Jeanneau
- Role: Racer
- Name: Sun Fast 1/2 Ton

Boat
- Displacement: 7,275 lb (3,300 kg)
- Draft: 5.48 ft (1.67 m)

Hull
- Type: monohull
- Construction: fiberglass
- LOA: 29.86 ft (9.10 m)
- LWL: 24.61 ft (7.50 m)
- Beam: 10.24 ft (3.12 m)

Hull appendages
- Keel: fin keel
- Ballast: 24.25 lb (11 kg)
- Rudder: internally-mounted spade-type rudder

Rig
- Rig type: Bermuda rig

Sails
- Sailplan: fractional rigged sloop
- Total sail area: 559.00 sq ft (51.933 m^{2})

The Sun Fast 1/2 Ton, also called the Jeanneau 1/2 Ton, is a French sailboat that was designed by Tony Castro as an International Offshore Rule Half Ton class racer and first built in 1984.

The Sun Fast 1/2 Ton's prototype was named Sun Fast and the design was the first boat in the Sun Fast sailboat range.

The even though only ten boats were built, the design was developed into the Arcadia 30 and the Sun Way 28.

== Production ==
The design was built by Jeanneau in France as a limited edition, with ten boats completed between 1984 and 1986, but it is now out of production.

== Design ==
The Sun Fast 1/2 Ton is a racing keelboat, built predominantly of fiberglass, with a carbon fiber or Kevlar-reinforced hull and deck factory options. It has a fractional sloop rig. The hull has a raked stem, a walk-through reverse transom, an internally mounted spade-type rudder controlled by a tiller and a fixed fin keel. It displaces 7,275 lb (3,300 kg) and carries 2,425 lb (1,100 kg) of lead ballast.

The boat has a draft of 5.48 ft (1.67 m) with the standard keel.

The design has minimal sleeping accommodation for four people, with four straight settees in the main cabin. The galley is located forward on the port side and the boat's centerline. The galley is equipped with a two-burner stove and a sink.

The design has a hull speed of 6.65 kn (12.32 km/h).

== Operational history ==
The boat is supported by an active class club that organizes racing events, the Half Ton Class.

== See also ==
- List of sailing boat types
