= MG 335 =

British sailboat class

Development
- Designer: Tony Castro
- Location: United Kingdom
- Year: 1986
- Builder: Northshore Yachts
- Name: MG 335

Boat
- Displacement: 8,900 lb (4,037 kg)
- Draft: 6.25 ft (1.91 m)

Hull
- Type: Monohull
- Construction: Glassfibre
- LOA: 34.75 ft (10.59 m)
- LWL: 27.67 ft (8.43 m)
- Beam: 11.25 ft (3.43 m)
- Engine: Volvo model 2002 diesel engine

Hull appendages
- Keel: fin keel
- Ballast: 3,800 lb (1,724 kg)
- Rudder: internally-mounted spade-type rudder

Rig
- General: Fractional rigged sloop
- I foretriangle height: 38.70 ft (11.80 m)
- J foretriangle base: 11.80 ft (3.60 m)
- P mainsail luff: 41.00 ft (12.50 m)
- E mainsail foot: 15.00 ft (4.57 m)

Sails
- Mainsail area: 307.50 sq ft (28.568 m^{2})
- Jib/genoa area: 228.33 sq ft (21.213 m^{2})
- Total sail area: 535.83 sq ft (49.780 m^{2})

Racing
- PHRF: 138 (average)

The MG 335 is a British sailboat, that was designed by Tony Castro and first built in 1986. The design is out of production.

== Production ==
The boat was built by Northshore Yachts in the United Kingdom between 1986 and 1994.

== Design ==
The MG 335 is a small recreational keelboat, built predominantly of glassfibre. It has a fractional sloop rig, an internally-mounted spade-type rudder and a fixed fin keel. It displaces 8,900 lb (4,037 kg) and carries 3,800 lb (1,724 kg) of ballast.

The boat has a draft of 6.25 ft (1.91 m) with the standard keel.

The boat is fitted with a Volvo model 2002 diesel engine. The fuel tank holds 25 U.S. gallons (95 L; 21 imp gal) and the fresh water tank has a capacity of 55 U.S. gallons (210 L; 46 imp gal).

The boat has a PHRF racing average handicap of 138 with a high of 138 and low of 138. It has a hull speed of 7.05 kn (13.06 km/h).

The MG 335 design was developed into the CS 34 in 1989, also designed by Castro and built by CS Yachts in Canada. The CS 34 differs in that it has a taller mast with a masthead rig and higher displacement than the MG 335.

== See also ==
- List of sailing boat types

Related development

- CS 34

Similar sailboats

- Catalina 34
