= CS40 =

CS40 may refer to:

- Cordata CS40, a computer design of the 1980s
- CS 40, a Canadian sailboat design of the 1980s
