= Regatta 39 =

Sailboat class

Development
- Designer: Tony Castro
- Location: France
- Year: 1982
- Builder: Jeanneau
- Role: Racer
- Name: Regatta 39

Boat
- Displacement: 10,600 lb (4,808 kg)
- Draft: 6.30 ft (1.92 m)

Hull
- Type: monohull
- Construction: fiberglass
- LOA: 39.17 ft (11.94 m)
- LWL: 30.42 ft (9.27 m)
- Beam: 12.58 ft (3.83 m)
- Engine: inboard diesel engine

Hull appendages
- Keel: fin keel
- Ballast: 5,200 lb (2,359 kg)
- Rudder: spade-type rudder

Rig
- Rig type: Bermuda rig
- I foretriangle height: 41.20 ft (12.56 m)
- J foretriangle base: 13.00 ft (3.96 m)
- P mainsail luff: 46.00 ft (14.02 m)
- E mainsail foot: 16.50 ft (5.03 m)

Sails
- Sailplan: fractional rigged sloop
- Mainsail area: 379.50 sq ft (35.257 m^{2})
- Jib/genoa area: 267.80 sq ft (24.879 m^{2})
- Total sail area: 647.30 sq ft (60.136 m^{2})

The Regatta 39 is a French sailboat that was designed by Tony Castro as a racer and first built in 1982.

The boats uses the same hull design as the 1982 Sun Shine 36 and 1983 Sun Shine 38.

== Production ==
The design was built by Jeanneau in France, starting in 1982, but it is now out of production.

== Design ==
The Regatta 39 is a racing keelboat, built predominantly of fiberglass. It has a fractional sloop rig or optional masthead sloop rig. The hull has a raked stem, a sharply reverse transom, an internally mounted spade-type rudder controlled by a wheel and a fixed fin keel. It displaces 10,600 lb (4,808 kg) and carries 5,200 lb (2,359 kg) of ballast.

The boat has a draft of 6.30 ft (1.92 m) with the standard keel and is fitted with an inboard diesel engine for docking and maneuvering.

The design has a hull speed of 7.39 kn (13.69 km/h).

== See also ==
- List of sailing boat types

Related development

- Sun Shine 36
- Sun Shine 38
