= Tony Castro =

British yacht designer (born 1952)

- Born: Antonio Maria de Lancastre de Mello e Castro; 1952 (age 73–74); Lisbon, Portugal
- Occupation: Yacht designer

Tony Castro (full name Antonio Maria de Lancastre de Mello e Castro), Conde das Antas, Conde da Lousa, Visconde de Pernes, born 1952, is a British yacht designer, known for numerous winning designs. Born in Lisbon, Portugal, he has been designing sailing and motor yachts since about 1980, with more than 10,000 boats launched, ranging from custom boats and one-design production models to superyachts. His design firm is based in Hamble-le-Rice, England.

== Career ==
As a Chartered Engineer, his first job came about when it was discovered that Denis Doyle's yacht Moonduster was floating above her 'marks', having been built less heavily than had been intended her designer, Germán Frers. Castro advised that lead be attached to the underside of the coachroof and had a hole drilled in the keel to reduce her stability, which gave the vessel an exceptionally good handicap for a boat of her size. Moonduster held the Round Ireland monohull record from Wicklow to Wicklow for nearly 15 years until the record was broken by a Whitbread around the World yacht. Her fastest elapsed time for the race came in 1984, when she took only 88h, 15m and 43s to complete the course.

After leaving Ron Holland’s design team in 1980, Castro's first significant racing yacht design was Justine III, for Frank Woods of the National Yacht Club in Ireland. She was the first and only yacht to win the One Ton Cup with five straight first place victories. The same owner then built Justine IV, which was crowned best Offshore Admiral's Cupper in 1983.

Then followed Iztanother Purla, a 43 footer which missed being chosen for the British Admiral's Cup Team, but then went on to win all 7 races in Cowes Week, beating all the Admiral's Cuppers, helmed by the late Sir Peter Blake and his NZ crew from Steinlager. A boat full of innovative ideas, including praddle steering, a method of steering using a vertical arm rising from below the cockpit floor.

Later successes included the two-time Quarter-Ton Cup winner McDonald's, the Half Ton Cup winner Balthazar, and the 6mR World Championship and Coupe de France winner Thisbe.

He was appointed by a member of Royal Cork Yacht Club to redesign the J24, with the aim of producing an exciting sports boat. The client expected a bigger mainsail, a new deck moulding and an effective keel to give greater stability. The result was the 1720 sportsboat. A new era in Sportsboat racing had started: the boats were built in County Kerry, and about 100 were built starting with sail number 1720.

Castro's designers work with many boatyards internationally, including the Royal Huisman, Jongert, Palmer Johnson, Neptunus, CS Yachts, Laser, and Jeanneau, Beneteau, Galeon, Focus, Williams, etc.

== Achievements ==
=== Major achievements ===
His designs have won Yacht of the Year awards, a Superyacht Design award and several World championships. He has also designed yachts for use in television drama productions by the BBC.

- 4 International Offshore Racing (IOR) World Championships
- Designer of the only IOR boat ever to win all its races in a World Championship
- International 6m World Champion
- Designer of 4 "Boat of Year" awards in the UK, France and US
- Admirals Cup Winner 1989 with "Juno IV"
- Co-Designer for "BLUE ARROW", a British America's Cup challenger

=== Designs ===
Castro's boat designs are:

- Arcadia 30 (Jeanneau)
- Barracuda 45
- Clipper 70
- CORK 1720
- CS 30
- CS 34
- CS 36 Merlin
- CS 40
- CS 44
- Jaguar 24
- Jaguar 265
- Laser SB3
- MG 26 (Castro)
- MG 335
- MG Spring 25
- Parker 31
- Parker 325
- Regatta 39 (Jeanneau)
- Saga 409
- SB3
- Sun Dream 28 (Jeanneau)
- Sun Fast 1/2 Ton (Jeanneau)
- Sun Odyssey 28.1 (Jeanneau)
- Sun Shine 36 (Jeanneau)
- Sun Shine 38 (Jeanneau)
- Sun Way 28 (Jeanneau)
- Sun Way 28 CB (Jeanneau)

=== Other achievements by date ===
Date	Boat	Award/Race	Achievement
1981	Justine III	One Ton World Cup	winner, (only yacht ever to win all five races)
1983	Jeanneau Sunshine	Yacht of the year - France	winner
1983	Justine IV	Admirals Cup	top offshore Admiral's Cupper in 1983
1983	Sunstreaker	One Ton Cup Worlds	2nd
1984	Balthazar	Half Ton Cup	top production Half-Tonner
1984	Balthazar	Tomatin Trophy Scottish Series	winner
1984	Sunstreaker	China Sea Series Race	overall winner
1984	Tsunami	China Sea Race	winner
1985	Intrigue	Admiral's Cup	Top Australian Admiral's Cupper
1985	Intrigue	Yacht of the year - Australia	winner
1985	Whirlwind	R.O.R.C. Yacht of the year	winner
1986	Barracuda Of Tarrant	R.O.R.C. Yacht of the Year	winner
1986	Blade	Freeman Cup (Canada)	winner
1986	Blade	Lake Ontario Cup	winner
1986	C.S.40	(Production) Yacht of the Year USA	winner
1986	Maiden Hong Kong	China Sea Race (700 mls)	winner
1986	Maiden Hong Kong	China Sea Series Race	overall winner
1986	Whopper	Quarter Ton Cup Worlds	2nd, (after protest only)
1987	McDonalds & Scandinavian Seaways	Quarter Ton Cup Worlds	winner
1987	MG 26	Top Production Quarter Tonner	winner
1987	Vento	Kiel Week Germany	winner
1988	Blue Arrow	British America's Cup Challenge	co-designer
1988	Jelik	China Sea Series	winner
1988	McDonalds & Scandinavian Seaways	Quarter Ton Cup Worlds	winner
1988	Mg 26	Top Production Quarter Tonner	winner
1988	Sunstreaker	China Sea Race	winner
1988	Turkish Delight	Spi Ouest France	winner
1989	Intrigue	1989 Sydney-Hobart Race	winner, Class II
1989	Juno IV	Admiral's Cup	winner - British 3 yacht team
1989	Juno IV	Southern Cross Cup 1989 series, Australia	winner - British 3 yacht team
1990	Blade	Freeman Cup (Canada)	winner
1990	Juno IV 45'AC	Kings Cup Spain	2nd
1990	Juno IV 45'AC	Sardinia Cup	2nd
1990	Juno IV 45'AC	Setimana Del Boque Race, Sardinia	winner
1990	Miss Piggy	Mini Admiral's Cup	winner
1990	Red Stripe 45'AC	Britannia Cup	winner
1990	Red Stripe 45'AC	Coronation Cup	winner
1990	Red Stripe 45'AC	New York Cup	winner
1991	Bimblegumbie	Fastnet Race	3rd, Two Ton Class
1991	Flair (MG335)	COWES WEEK	winner, Class IV
1991	Miss Piggy (1/2 Tonner)	Burnham Week	winner, Class II
1991	Red Stripe 45'AC	Coronation Cup	winner
1991	Red Stripe 45'AC	Rocking Chair	winner
1992	Intrigue	Maria Island Race- Tasmania	winner
1992	Jelik	China Sea Race	winner, CHS overall
1992	Red Source	Commodore's Cup	fifth, IMS
1993	Blade	Centennial Race, Canada	winner, IMS overall
1993	Blade	Freeman Cup, Canada	winner, IMS overall
1993	Espirito De Madeira	AMERICA 500 (Transatlantic Race)	winner
1993	Flair (MG346)	Britania Cup	winner
1993	Miss Piggy	Patison Cup - East Anglia	winner
1993	Miss Piggy	Patison Cup - East Anglia	winner
1993	Red Source	Winter Series - Solent	six-times winner
1994	Blade	Boat of the Year, Canada	winner
1994	Blade	Centennial Race, Canada	winner, IMS overall
1994	Blade	Freeman Cup, Canada	winner, IMS overall
1994	Blade	Lake Ontario Cup	winner, IMS overall
1994	Flair (MG346)	CORK WEEK ClassIV	winner
1994	Millennium	China Sea Race	winner, CHS overall
1994	Red Source	Autumn Series Lymington UK	seven-times winner
1994	Red Source	Rocking Chair -Cowes Week	winner
1994	Red Source	Spring Series - Solent	winner
1995	Cordon Rouge (MG345)	NECRA CHS95	winner, CHS overall
1995	Intrigue	King of Derwent -Tasmania	winner, IMS overall
1995	MG26	Tour of Portugal	winner, CHS overall
1995	Miss Piggy	Buckleys Goblet - EAORA	winner, Class IV
1995	Miss Piggy	Cork Sand Race	winner
1995	Miss Piggy	COWES Week	winner, Class IV
1995	Miss Piggy	EAORA CHS95	winner, CHS overall
1995	Miss Piggy	Sunk Race - EAORA	winner
1995	Miss Piggy	Walton Trophy	winner
1995	Mota Galiza	Tour of Portugal	winner, IMS overall
1995	Rocio	Ruta de la Sal -Spain	winner
1996	Blaze	Falmouth Week	overall winner
1996	Circuiteer	CHS Nationals	winner, CHS Class II
1996	Circuiteer	CORK Week	2nd, Class II
1996	Circuiteer	Plymouth Spring Series	winner, CHS overall
1996	Cork One Design -1720	Red Funnel Easter Challenge	winner, CHS overall
1996	Cork One Design -1720	Warsash Spring Series	winner, Sportsboat Class
1996	Flair II	Cork Week	2nd, Class III
1997	Circuiteer	Cowes Week	winner, Class III
1997	Circuiteer	Hamble Week -Weekend	four-times winner, Class I
1997	Cork One Design -1720	Round the Island Dinghy Race	winner, Sportsboat Class
1997	Cork One Design -1720	Rover Series	winner, Sportsboat Class
1997	Fend-La-Bise (ILC30)	RIAS (Spain)	winner, IMS overall
1997	Fend-La-Bise (ILC30)	Tour of PORTUGAL	winner, IMS overall
1997	Flair II	Round the Island Race	winner, Class III
1997	Red Source	Lymington Spring Series	winner, Class I
1998	Circuiteer	Easter Regatta	winner, Class III
1998	Circuiteer	Round Island Race	winner, Classes 1 to 4
1998	Cork One Design -1720	Spi Ouest - (France)	overall winner
1998	Miss Carol	Rio Circuit (Brasil)	overall winner
1998	Red Source	Lymington Spring Series	winner, Class I
1998	Shoot The Bar	North Sea Race	winner, Class II
1999	1720 One Design	Easter regatta - UK	overall winner
1999	Circuiteer	UK National Championships	winner, CHS Class II
1999	Cork One Design -1720	Spi Ouest - La Rochelle- (France)	winner, sportsboat Class
1999	Fend-La-Bise	Asturias Trophy	winner, IMS Class II
1999	Number One	International Superyacht design Awards	one of the five sailing yacht candidates over 36m
2000	Cork One Design -1720	Spi Ouest -La Rochelle- (France)	1st, 2nd and 3rd sportsboat Class
2000	Williams 30	Motorboat & Yachting 'Cameron Diaz Award'	
2001	Fidel	International Superyacht design Awards	one of six 23-36m sailing yacht candidates
2001	Passe Partout	International Superyacht design Awards	one of six sailing yacht candidates over 36m
2004	Simeron	International Superyacht design Awards	one of the five 23-36m sailing yacht candidates
2005	Ameena	Showboats international Awards	best sailing yacht under 40m
2006	Arcadia	International Superyacht design Awards	candidate, 32-43m power yachts
2010	Galeon 700 Raptor Skydeck	World Yachts Awards - best design	winner
2010	Galeon 700 Raptor Skydeck	World Yachts Awards - most innovative design	winner
2010	Scorpione Dei Mari	Superyacht Cup Palma (Regatta)	winner
2014	Velasco 43	European Motorboat Of The Year	winner
2014	Elan 30 Power	European Motorboat Of The Year Under 35 ft	winner
2015	Gunfleet 58	Sail Magazine's Best Boat	winner
2016	Galeon 500 Fly	European Motorboat Of The Year Under 45 ft	winner
2016	Galeon 510 Skydeck	Most Innovative Yacht Under 24M	winner

== Memberships ==
- Member of the Royal Institution of Naval Architects ( UK - RINA)
- Member of the Society of Naval Architects ( USA - SNAME)
- Member of FEANI
- Member of the Royal Cork Yacht Club
- Member of the Royal Ocean Racing Club
- Member of the Royal Southern Yacht Club
- Member of the Associacao Naval de Lisboa
- Member of the Clube Naval de Cascais
