= Hunter Passage 42 =

Sailboat class

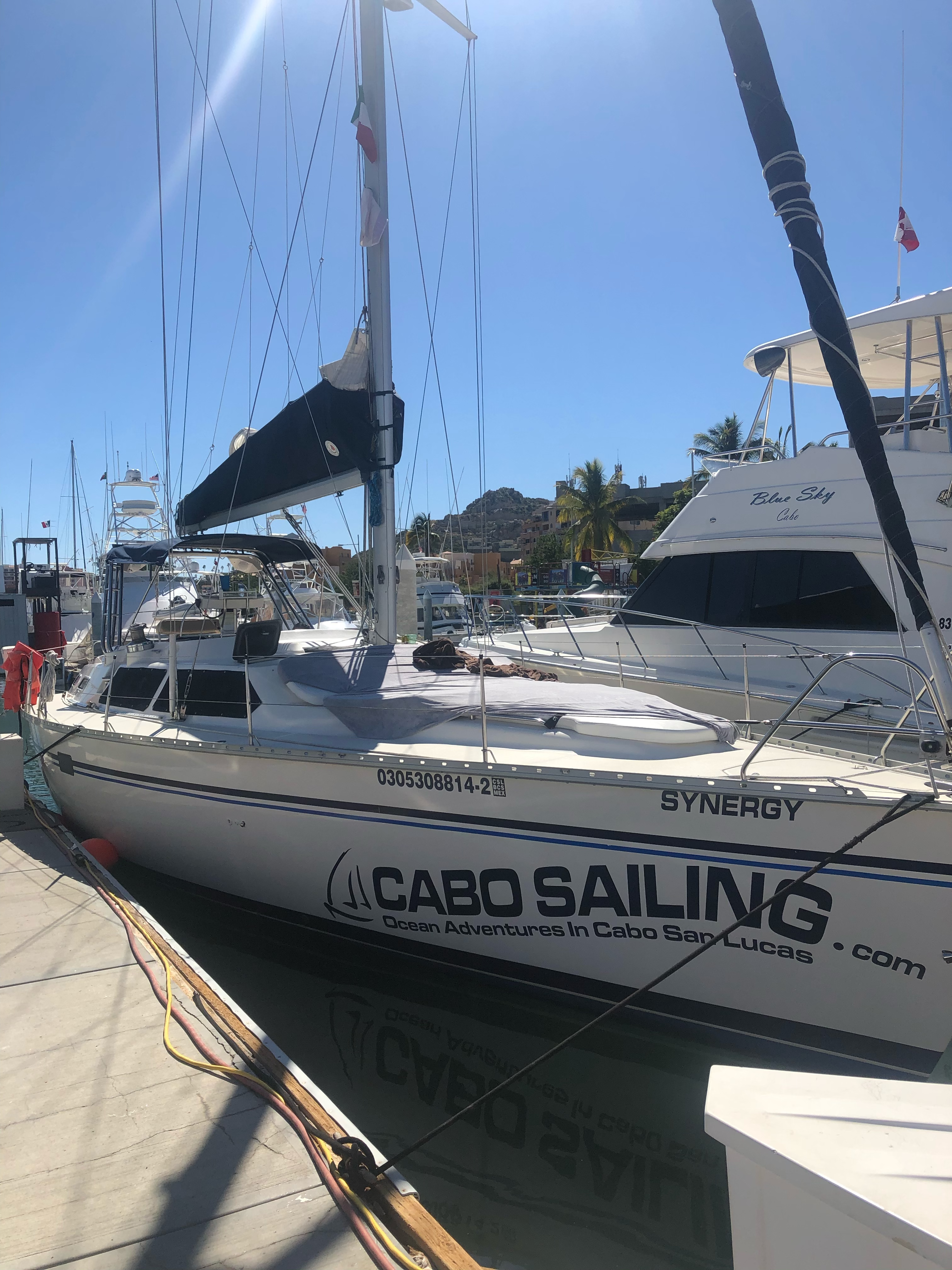

Development
- Designer: Hunter Design Team
- Location: United States
- Year: 1989
- Builder: Hunter Marine
- Name: Hunter Passage 42

Boat
- Displacement: 24,000 lb (10,886 kg)
- Draft: 4.92 ft (1.50 m)

Hull
- Type: Monohull
- Construction: Fiberglass
- LOA: 42.50 ft (12.95 m)
- LWL: 38.00 ft (11.58 m)
- Beam: 14.00 ft (4.27 m)
- Engine: Yanmar 4JH2TE 62 hp (46 kW) diesel engine

Hull appendages
- Keel: wing keel
- Ballast: 7,700 lb (3,493 kg)
- Rudder: internally-mounted spade-type rudder

Rig
- Rig type: Bermuda rig
- I foretriangle height: 55.50 ft (16.92 m)
- J foretriangle base: 16.00 ft (4.88 m)
- P mainsail luff: 48.00 ft (14.63 m)
- E mainsail foot: 15.50 ft (4.72 m)

Sails
- Sailplan: B&R rigged Masthead sloop
- Mainsail area: 368.13 sq ft (34.200 m^{2})
- Jib/genoa area: 444.00 sq ft (41.249 m^{2})
- Total sail area: 949 sq ft (88.2 m^{2}) (Actual)

The Hunter Passage 42 is an American sailboat that was designed by the Hunter Design Team as a cruiser and first built in 1989.

The Passage 42 may be confused with the unrelated 2016 42-foot sailboat design, the Marlow-Hunter 42SS.

== Production ==
The design was built by Hunter Marine in the United States from 1989 to 1997, but it is now out of production.

== Design ==
The Hunter Passage 42 is a recreational keelboat, built predominantly of fiberglass. It has a B&R masthead sloop rig, a center cockpit, a raked stem, a walk-through reverse transom with a swimming platform and folding ladder, an internally mounted spade-type rudder controlled by a wheel and a fixed wing keel. It displaces 24,000 lb (10,886 kg) and carries 7,700 lb (3,493 kg) of ballast.

The boat has a draft of 4.93 ft (1.50 m) with the standard wing keel fitted.

The boat is fitted with a Japanese Yanmar 4JH2TE diesel engine of 62 hp (46 kW). The fuel tank holds 70 U.S. gallons (260 L; 58 imp gal) and the fresh water tank has a capacity of 150 U.S. gallons (570 L; 120 imp gal).

Factory standard equipment included a 130% roller furling genoa, dual two-speed self tailing winches, marine VHF radio, knotmeter, depth sounder, AM/FM radio and CD player with eight speakers, anchor teak and holly cabin sole, fully enclosed head with shower, private forward and aft cabins, with bedding, a dinette table that converts to a berth, microwave oven, dual sinks, three-burner gimbaled liquid petroleum gas stove and oven and life jackets. Factory options included in mast mainsail furling, air conditioning, electric halyard winch and leather cushions. It has 78 in (198 cm) of below-decks headroom.

The design has a hull speed of 8.08 kn (14.96 km/h).

== Operational history ==
In a 2010 review, yacht broker Richard Jordan noted the design and space below decks, "down below showcases the strengths of Hunter. The interior layout with centerline queen aft and a saloon you could yoga in is what every cruiser lusts for." In addressing detractors, he stated, "some stuffy sailors will without thought disparage these yachts despite their advantages."

== See also ==
- List of sailing boat types

Similar sailboats

- C&C 42 Custom
- C&C 131
- Marlow-Hunter 42SS
