= CS 30 =

Canadian keelboat built 1984–1990

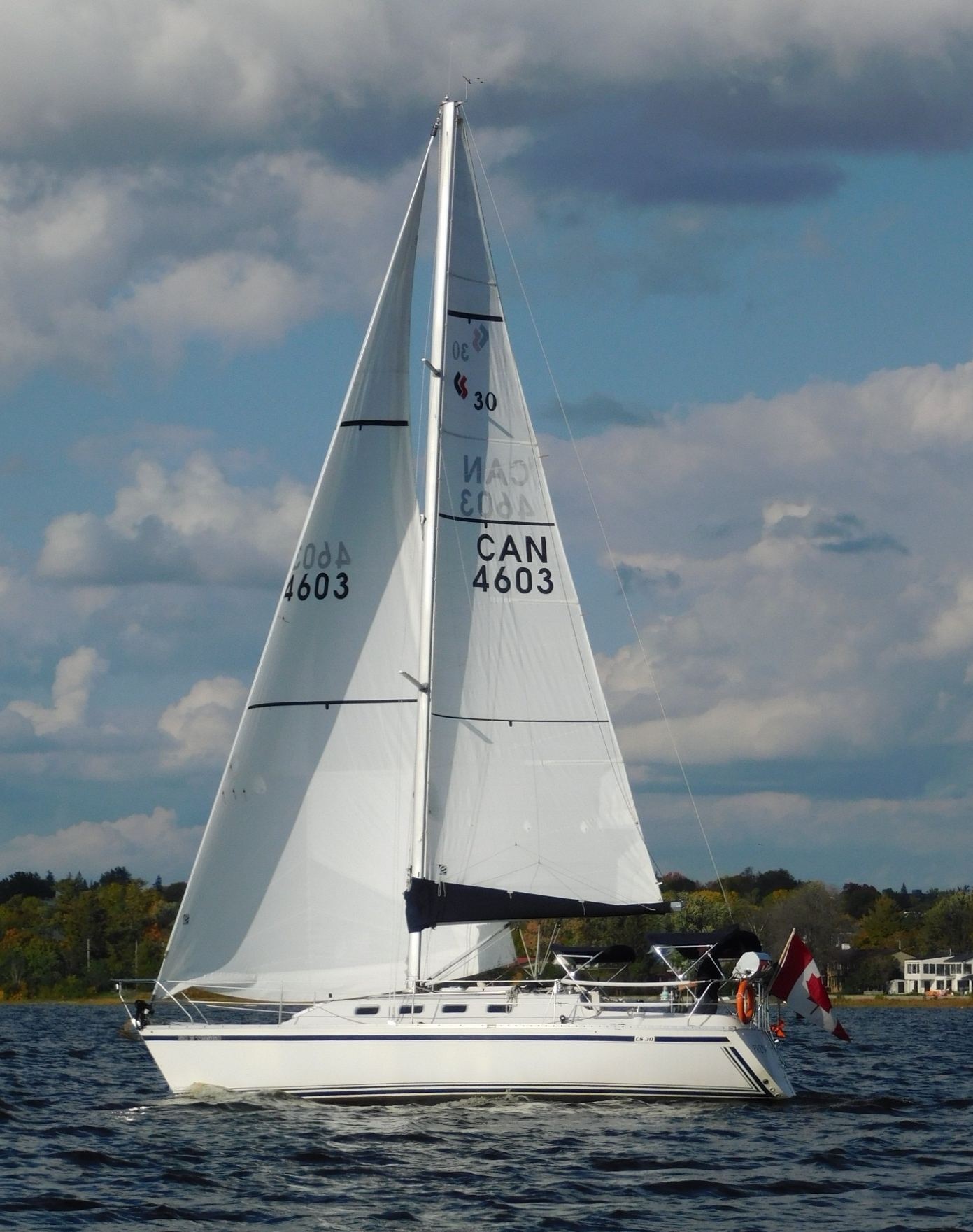

Development
- Designer: Tony Castro
- Location: Canada
- Year: 1984
- No. built: 500
- Builder: CS Yachts
- Name: CS 30

Boat
- Displacement: 8,000 lb (3,629 kg)
- Draft: 5.50 ft (1.68 m)

Hull
- Type: Monohull
- Construction: Fibreglass
- LOA: 30.00 ft (9.14 m)
- LWL: 25.42 ft (7.75 m)
- Beam: 10.25 ft (3.12 m)
- Engine: Volvo diesel engine 18 hp (13 kW)

Hull appendages
- Keel: fin keel
- Ballast: 3,440 lb (1,560 kg)
- Rudder: internally-mounted spade-type rudder

Rig
- General: Masthead sloop
- I foretriangle height: 42.00 ft (12.80 m)
- J foretriangle base: 12.00 ft (3.66 m)
- P mainsail luff: 36.50 ft (11.13 m)
- E mainsail foot: 11.50 ft (3.51 m)

Sails
- Mainsail area: 209.88 sq ft (19.498 m^{2})
- Jib/genoa area: 252.00 sq ft (23.412 m^{2})
- Total sail area: 461.88 sq ft (42.910 m^{2})

Racing
- PHRF: 156 (average)

The CS 30 is a recreational keelboat built by Canadian Sailcraft. It became their most successful model, with 90 built the first year and 500 completed over the whole production run from 1984-1990.

== Design ==
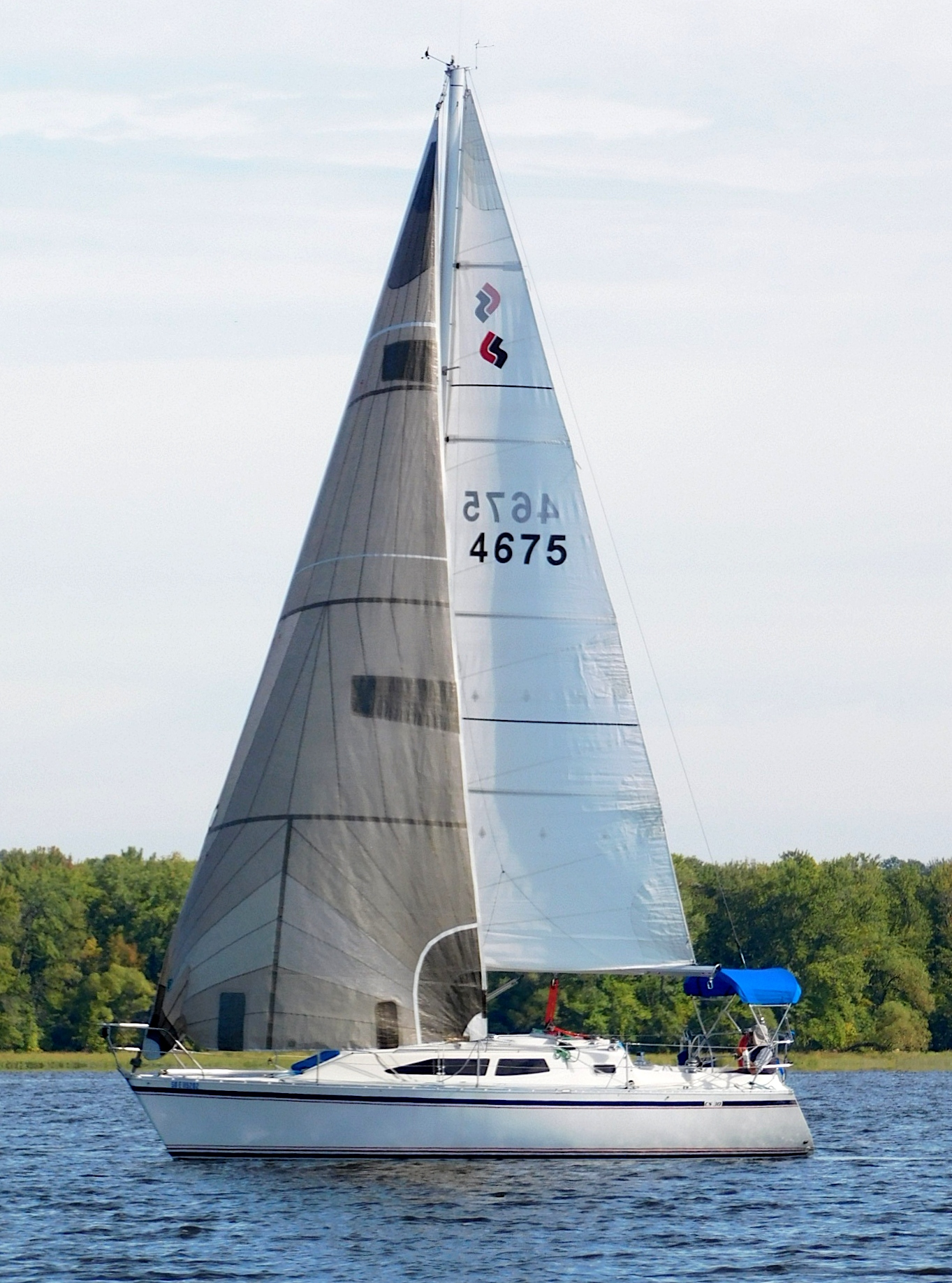
CS 30 with alternate window arrangement

Designed by Tony Castro, the fibreglass hull has an internally-mounted spade-type rudder, and areverse transomkeel. It displaces 8,000 lb (3,629 kg) and carries 3,440 lb (1,560 kg) of ballast.

It has a masthead sloop rig with double spreaders.

The boat has a draft of 5.50 ft (1.68 m) with the standard keel, 4.25 ft (1.30 m) with the optional shoal draft keel and 4.5 ft (1.4 m) with the optional wing keel.

The boat is fitted with a Volvo diesel engine of 18 hp (13 kW). The fuel tank holds 19 U.S. gallons (72 L; 16 imp gal) and the fresh water tank has a capacity of 30 U.S. gallons (110 L; 25 imp gal).

The winged keel version of the boat has a PHRF racing average handicap of 156 with a high of 185 and low of 144. It has a hull speed of 6.76 kn (12.52 km/h).
