= Hunter 40 =

Sailboat class

Development
- Designer: Cortland Steck
- Location: United States
- Year: 1984
- Builder: Hunter Marine
- Name: Hunter 40

Boat
- Displacement: 17,400 lb (7,893 kg)
- Draft: 6.50 ft (1.98 m)

Hull
- Type: Monohull
- Construction: Fiberglass
- LOA: 39.58 ft (12.06 m)
- LWL: 32.50 ft (9.91 m)
- Beam: 13.42 ft (4.09 m)
- Engine: Yanmar diesel engine

Hull appendages
- Keel: fin keel
- Ballast: 7,900 lb (3,583 kg)
- Rudder: internally-mounted spade-type rudder

Rig
- Rig type: Bermuda rig
- I foretriangle height: 53.75 ft (16.38 m)
- J foretriangle base: 17.00 ft (5.18 m)
- P mainsail luff: 48.00 ft (14.63 m)
- E mainsail foot: 13.75 ft (4.19 m)

Sails
- Sailplan: B&R rigged Masthead sloop
- Mainsail area: 330.00 sq ft (30.658 m^{2})
- Jib/genoa area: 456.88 sq ft (42.446 m^{2})
- Total sail area: 786.88 sq ft (73.104 m^{2})

Racing
- PHRF: 105 (average)

The Hunter 40 is an American sailboat that was designed by Cortland Steck and first built in 1984.

The design was originally marketed by the manufacturer as the Hunter 40, but is now usually referred to as the Hunter 40-1 or the Hunter 40 Legend, to differentiate it from the unrelated 2012 Marlow-Hunter 40 design, which is sometimes called the Hunter 40-2.

== Production ==
The design was built by Hunter Marine in the United States between 1984 and 1990, but it is now out of production.

== Design ==
The Hunter 40 is a recreational keelboat, built predominantly of fiberglass, with wood trim. It has a B&R rig masthead sloop rig, a raked stem, a reverse transom with a folding boarding ladder, an internally mounted spade-type rudder controlled by a wheel and a fixed fin keel.

The boat has a draft of 6.5 ft (2.0 m) with the standard keel and 5.0 ft (1.5 m) with the optional shoal draft keel.

The boat is fitted with a Japanese Yanmar diesel engine. The fuel tank holds 40 U.S. gallons (150 L; 33 imp gal) and the fresh water tank has a capacity of 100 U.S. gallons (380 L; 83 imp gal). It has a hull speed of 7.64 kn (14.15 km/h).

Factory standard equipment included a 110% roller furling genoa, four two-speed self tailing winches, AM/FM radio and cassette player with four speakers, teak and holly cabin sole, two fully enclosed heads with showers, private forward and aft cabins, a dinette table, refrigerator, dual stainless steel sinks and a three-burner gimbaled compressed natural gas stove and oven.

== Variants ==
Hunter 40 Deep Keel
This model displaces 17,400 lb (7,893 kg) and carries 7,900 lb (3,583 kg) of ballast. The boat has a draft of 6.5 ft (2.0 m) with the standard deep keel. The boat has a PHRF racing average handicap of 105 with a high of 99 and low of 111.
Hunter 40 Shoal Draft
This model displaces 17,900 lb (8,119 kg) and carries 8,400 lb (3,810 kg) of ballast. The boat has a draft of 5.00 ft (1.52 m) with the optional shoal draft keel. The boat has a PHRF racing average handicap of 108 with a high of 102 and low of 114.

== See also ==
- List of sailing boat types

Similar sailboats

- C&C 40
- Columbia 40
- CS 40
- Hunter 40.5
- Hunter 41
- Marlow-Hunter 40
