= CS 44 =

Sailboat class

Development
- Designer: Tony Castro
- Location: Canada
- Year: 1985
- No. built: 1
- Builder: CS Yachts
- Name: CS 44

Boat
- Displacement: 22,000 lb (9,979 kg)
- Draft: 8.16 ft (2.49 m)

Hull
- Type: Monohull
- Construction: Fibreglass
- LOA: 44.08 ft (13.44 m)
- LWL: 34.67 ft (10.57 m)
- Beam: 13.67 ft (4.17 m)
- Engine: Perkins M-4108 52 hp (39 kW) diesel motor

Hull appendages
- Keel: fin keel
- Ballast: 9,000 lb (4,082 kg)
- Rudder: internally-mounted spade-type rudder

Rig
- General: Masthead sloop
- I foretriangle height: 58.00 ft (17.68 m)
- J foretriangle base: 16.87 ft (5.14 m)
- P mainsail luff: 52.00 ft (15.85 m)
- E mainsail foot: 18.50 ft (5.64 m)

Sails
- Mainsail area: 481.00 sq ft (44.686 m^{2})
- Jib/genoa area: 489.23 sq ft (45.451 m^{2})
- Total sail area: 970.23 sq ft (90.137 m^{2})

Racing
- PHRF: 69 (average)

The CS 44 is a Canadian sailboat, that was designed by Tony Castro.

== Production ==
Only one CS 44 was completed and it was built by CS Yachts in Canada, in 1985.

== Design ==
The CS 44 is a recreational keelboat, built predominantly of fibreglass, with Kevlar and a balsawood core. It has a masthead sloop rig, an internally-mounted spade-type rudder and a fixed fin keel. It displaces 2,000 lb (907 kg) and carries 9,000 lb (4,082 kg) of lead ballast.

The boat has a draft of 8.16 ft (2.49 m) and is fitted with a Perkins Engines M-4108 diesel engine of 52 hp (39 kW).

The boat has a PHRF racing average handicap of 69 with a high of 69 and low of 69. It has a hull speed of 7.93 kn (14.69 km/h).

== See also ==
- List of sailing boat types

Similar sailboats

- C&C 131
