= Hunter 40.5 =

Sailboat class

Development
- Designer: Hunter Design Team
- Location: United States
- Year: 1991
- Builder: Hunter Marine
- Name: Hunter 40.5

Boat
- Displacement: 20,000 lb (9,072 kg)
- Draft: 4.92 ft (1.50 m)

Hull
- Type: Monohull
- Construction: Fiberglass
- LOA: 40.17 ft (12.24 m)
- LWL: 35.33 ft (10.77 m)
- Beam: 12.42 ft (3.79 m)
- Engine: Volvo or Yanmar 50 hp (37 kW) diesel engine

Hull appendages
- Keel: wing keel
- Ballast: 7,000 lb (3,175 kg)
- Rudder: internally-mounted spade-type rudder

Rig
- Rig type: Bermuda rig
- I foretriangle height: 50.33 ft (15.34 m)
- J foretriangle base: 13.25 ft (4.04 m)
- P mainsail luff: 52.00 ft (15.85 m)
- E mainsail foot: 16.42 ft (5.00 m)

Sails
- Sailplan: Fractional B&R rigged sloop
- Mainsail area: 426.92 sq ft (39.662 m^{2})
- Jib/genoa area: 333.44 sq ft (30.978 m^{2})
- Total sail area: 760.36 sq ft (70.640 m^{2})

Racing
- PHRF: 108 (average)

The Hunter 40.5, also referred to as the Legend 40.5, is an American sailboat that was designed by the Hunter Design Team as a cruiser and first built in 1991.

== Production ==
The design was built by Hunter Marine in the United States from 1991 to 1997, but it is now out of production.

== Design ==
The Hunter 40.5 is a recreational keelboat, built predominantly of fiberglass. It has a fractional sloop B&R rig, a slightly raked stem, a walk-through reverse transom with a swimming platform and folding ladder, an internally mounted spade-type rudder controlled by a wheel and a fixed wing keel. It displaces 20,000 lb (9,072 kg) and carries 7,000 lb (3,175 kg) of ballast.

The boat has a draft of 4.92 ft (1.50 m) with the standard wing keel.

The boat is fitted with a Swedish Volvo or Japanese Yanmar diesel engine of 50 hp (37 kW). The fuel tank holds 40 U.S. gallons (150 L; 33 imp gal) and the fresh water tank has a capacity of 150 U.S. gallons (570 L; 120 imp gal).

Factory standard equipment included a 130% roller furling genoa, four two-speed self tailing winches, anodized spars, marine VHF radio, knotmeter, depth sounder, AM/FM radio and CD player with four speakers, anchor roller, hardwood cabin sole, fully enclosed head with shower, private forward and aft cabins, a dinette table that converts to a berth, complete set of kitchen dishes, microwave oven, dual stainless steel sinks, three-burner gimbaled liquid petroleum gas stove and oven and life jackets. Factory options included air conditioning and a mast furling mainsail.

The design has a PHRF racing average handicap of 108 with a high of 120 and low of 102. It has a hull speed of 7.96 kn (14.74 km/h).

== See also ==
- List of sailing boat types

Similar sailboats

- C&C 40
- CS 40
- Columbia 40
- Hunter 40
- Hunter 41
- Marlow-Hunter 40
