= Marlow-Hunter 42SS =

Sailboat class

Development
- Designer: Hunter Design Team
- Location: United States
- Year: 2016
- Builder: Marlow-Hunter
- Name: Marlow-Hunter 42SS

Boat
- Displacement: 19,098 lb (8,663 kg)
- Draft: 6.67 ft (2.03 m)

Hull
- Type: Monohull
- Construction: Fiberglass
- LOA: 41.25 ft (12.57 m)
- LWL: 36.00 ft (10.97 m)
- Beam: 13.17 ft (4.01 m)
- Engine: Yanmar 45 hp (34 kW) diesel engine

Hull appendages
- Keel: fin keel
- Ballast: 5,425 lb (2,461 kg)
- Rudder: internally-mounted spade-type rudder

Rig
- Rig type: Bermuda rig

Sails
- Sailplan: Fractional B&R rigged sloop
- Total sail area: 970 sq ft (90 m^{2})

The Marlow-Hunter 42SS is an American sailboat that was designed by the Hunter Design Team as a cruiser and first built in 2016.

The "SS" designation is intended to refer to automobiles of the past, like the Chevrolet Camaro SS, "as it connotes the era of American Muscle Cars denoting “Super Sport” when lumbering and obese chariots had held sway previously."

The 42SS may be confused with the unrelated 1989 42-foot sailboat design, the Hunter Passage 42.

== Production ==
The design was built by Hunter Marine in the United States, starting in 2016 and remained in production through 2019.

== Design ==
The Marlow-Hunter 42SS is a recreational keelboat, built predominantly of fiberglass with Kevlar reinforcing in the forward hull and polypropylene honeycomb Nida-cores. It has a fractional sloop B&R rig, a stainless steel arch that mounts the mainsheet traveler, a nearly plumb stem, a reverse transom with a fold-down swimming platform and folding ladder, an internally mounted spade-type rudder controlled by a laterally tilting, folding wheel and a fixed deep fin keel or shoal draft keel. The deep draft fin keel version displaces 19,098 lb (8,663 kg) and carries 5,425 lb (2,461 kg) of ballast, while the shoal draft keel version displaces 19,700 lb (8,936 kg) and carries 6,027 lb (2,734 kg) of ballast.

The boat has a draft of 6.67 ft (2.03 m) with the standard keel and 5.17 ft (1.58 m) with the optional shoal draft keel.

The steering wheel can be set in port, center or starboard positions by use of a foot locking lever, as desired by the helmsman. This provides the advantages of a dual-wheel configuration, but occupies less cockpit space. The wheel also folds when not in use.

The boat is fitted with a Japanese Yanmar diesel engine of 45 hp (34 kW). The fuel tank holds 50 U.S. gallons (190 L; 42 imp gal) and the fresh water tank has a capacity of 90 U.S. gallons (340 L; 75 imp gal). The holding tank holds 40 U.S. gallons (150 L; 33 imp gal).

Factory options included roller furling jib and mast-furling mainsail.

== Operational history ==
In a short review upon the introduction of the design in 2016, Cruising World, reported that "Cat’s-eye-style ports run the length of the low-profile cabin top, and the house extends well aft to provide lots of living space below."

== See also ==
- List of sailing boat types

Similar sailboats

- C&C 42 Custom
- C&C 131
- Hunter Passage 42
