= C&C 42 Custom =

Sailboat class

Development
- Designer: C&C Design
- Location: Canada
- Year: 1976
- Builder: C&C Yachts
- Name: C&C 42 Custom

Boat
- Displacement: 20,000 lb (9,072 kg)
- Draft: 7.00 ft (2.13 m)

Hull
- Type: Monohull
- Construction: Fibreglass
- LOA: 42.50 ft (12.95 m)
- LWL: 34.25 ft (10.44 m)
- Beam: 12.92 ft (3.94 m)
- Engine: Yanmar 3JH3E 40 hp (30 kW) diesel engine

Hull appendages
- Keel: swept fin keel
- Rudder: internally-mounted spade-type rudder

Rig
- Rig type: Bermuda rig

Sails
- Sailplan: Masthead sloop
- Total sail area: 835 sq ft (77.6 m^{2})

Racing
- PHRF: 78 (average)

The C&C 42 Custom is a Canadian sailboat, that was designed by C&C Design and first built in 1976.

== Production ==
The design was built by C&C Yachts in Canada, starting in 1976, but it is now out of production.

== Design ==
The C&C 42 Custom is a small recreational keelboat, built predominantly of fibreglass, with wood trim. It has a masthead sloop rig, a raked stem, a raised reverse transom, an internally-mounted spade-type rudder controlled by a wheel and a fixed swept fin keel. It displaces 20,000 lb (9,072 kg).

The boat has a draft of 7.00 ft (2.13 m) with the standard keel fitted.

The boat is fitted with a Japanese Yanmar 3JH3E diesel engine of 40 hp (30 kW). The fuel tank holds 20 U.S. gallons (76 L; 17 imp gal) and the fresh water tank has a capacity of 80 U.S. gallons (300 L; 67 imp gal).

The design has a PHRF racing average handicap of 78 with a high of 71 and low of 81. It has a hull speed of 7.84 kn (14.52 km/h).

== See also ==
- List of sailing boat types

Similar sailboats

- Hunter Passage 42
- Marlow-Hunter 42SS
