= Columbia 40 =

Sailboat class

Development
- Designer: Charles Morgan
- Location: United States
- Year: 1964
- No. built: 55
- Builder: Columbia Yachts
- Name: Columbia 40

Boat
- Displacement: 18,900 lb (8,573 kg)
- Draft: 9.00 ft (2.74 m) with centerboard down

Hull
- Type: Monohull
- Construction: Fiberglass
- LOA: 39.50 ft (12.04 m)
- LWL: 27.75 ft (8.46 m)
- Beam: 10.50 ft (3.20 m)
- Engine: Universal Atomic 4 30 hp (22 kW) gasoline engine

Hull appendages
- Keel: long keel and centerboard
- Ballast: 8,400 lb (3,810 kg)
- Rudder: keel-mounted rudder

Rig
- Rig type: Bermuda rig
- I foretriangle height: 43.50 ft (13.26 m)
- J foretriangle base: 15.00 ft (4.57 m)
- P mainsail luff: 37.60 ft (11.46 m)
- E mainsail foot: 18.50 ft (5.64 m)

Sails
- Sailplan: Masthead sloop
- Mainsail area: 347.80 sq ft (32.312 m^{2})
- Jib/genoa area: 326.25 sq ft (30.310 m^{2})
- Total sail area: 647.05 sq ft (60.113 m^{2})

The Columbia 40 is an American sailboat that was designed by Charles Morgan as a racer-cruiser and first built in 1964.

The design was based upon Morgan's Sabre, a one-off racing boat that was successful in competition, winning Class C 1964 Southern Ocean Racing Circuit (SORC) and second place overall. Sabre was derived from the racing ketch Paper Tiger which was the overall winner of the 1961 and 1962 SORC racing series.

== Production ==
The design was built by Columbia Yachts in the United States. The company built 55 examples of the type from 1964 to 1969.

== Design ==
The factory sales brochure described the design goals, "A real yacht designed to go to sea in comfort while giving top performance."

The Columbia 40 is a recreational keelboat, built predominantly of fiberglass, with wood trim. It has a steel frame molded into the fiberglass structure. It has a masthead sloop rig, or optional yawl rig, with the additional of a mizzen mast. Features include a raked stem, a raised counter transom, a keel-mounted rudder controlled by a tiller and a fixed long keel with a hydraulically raised, retractable centerboard. It displaces 18,900 lb (8,573 kg) and carries 8,400 lb (3,810 kg) of ballast.

The steel tube frame was designed to take the standing rigging loads and pass them through the steel structure to the hull bulkheads and the deck structure. This allowed very high tensions on the cabling, for example 5,800 lb (2,631 kg) on the forestay and allowed a very precise sail shape, providing better performance in light and heavier winds.

The boat has a draft of 9.00 ft (2.74 m) with the centreboard extended and 4.50 ft (1.37 m) with it retracted. Being hydraulically actuated, the centerboard was intended to be raised when sailing downwind to reduce whetted area and drag, as in dinghy sailing.

The boat is fitted with a Universal Atomic 4 30 hp (22 kW) gasoline engine for docking and maneuvering. The fuel tank holds 40 U.S. gallons (150 L; 33 imp gal) and the fresh water tank has a capacity of 60 U.S. gallons (230 L; 50 imp gal).

The galley is located on the port side at the bottom of the companionway steps, and includes a three-burner stove. The head is located forward, just aft of the bow "V"-berth, and has a privacy door. Additional sleeping accommodation is provided in the main cabin, including a dinette table that can be dropped to form a double berth, and a single berth.

The Columbia 34 was created in 1966 with the addition of a deck adapted from the Columbia 40 mated to the hull of the Columbia 33 Caribbean design.

The Columbia 38 was also developed from the Columbia 40.

== Operational history ==
The design was used to win the 1966 SORC Miami-Nassau race and also took second, third and fifth places in SORC Class C.

== See also ==
- List of sailing boat types

Related development

- Columbia 34
- Columbia 38

Similar sailboats

- C&C 40
- CS 40
- Hunter 40
- Hunter 40.5
- Hunter 41
- Marlow-Hunter 40
