= CS 27 =

1970s Canadian recreational keelboat

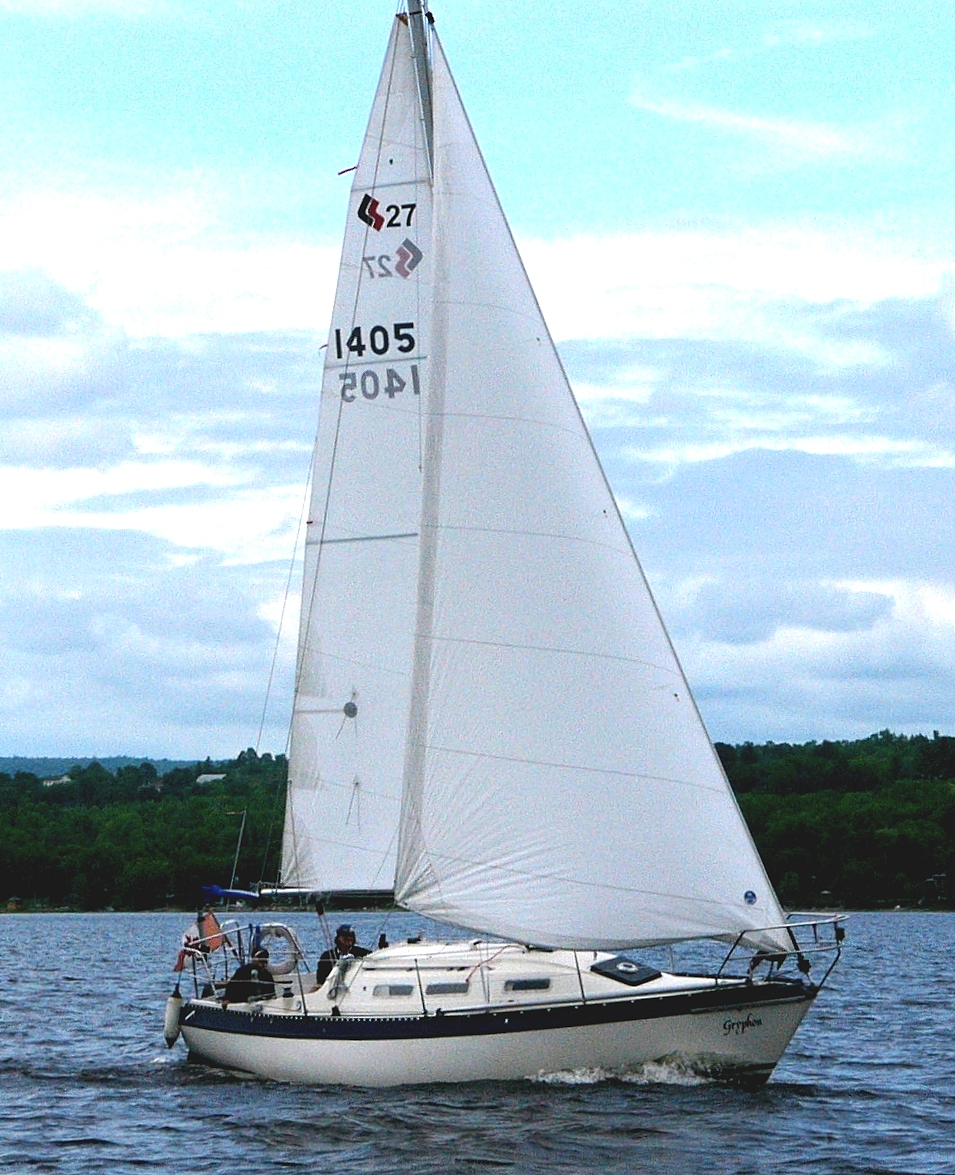

Development
- Designer: Raymond Wall
- Location: Canada
- Year: 1975
- No. built: 480
- Builder: CS Yachts
- Name: CS 27

Boat
- Displacement: 6,100 lb (2,767 kg)
- Draft: 5.17 ft (1.58 m)

Hull
- Type: Monohull
- Construction: Fibreglass
- LOA: 27.00 ft (8.23 m)
- LWL: 23.92 ft (7.29 m)
- Beam: 9.33 ft (2.84 m)
- Engine: Yanmar diesel engine

Hull appendages
- Keel: fin keel
- Ballast: 2,400 lb (1,089 kg)
- Rudder: transom-mounted rudder

Rig
- General: Masthead sloop
- I foretriangle height: 36.20 ft (11.03 m)
- J foretriangle base: 10.80 ft (3.29 m)
- P mainsail luff: 30.00 ft (9.14 m)
- E mainsail foot: 9.70 ft (2.96 m)

Sails
- Mainsail area: 145.50 sq ft (13.517 m^{2})
- Jib/genoa area: 195.48 sq ft (18.161 m^{2})
- Total sail area: 340.98 sq ft (31.678 m^{2})

Racing
- PHRF: 207 (average)

The CS 27 is a recreational keelboat built by CS Yachts in Canada, with 480 examples completed between 1975 and 1983.

== Design ==
The fibreglass hull has a transom-hung rudder and a fixed fin keel. It has a draft of 5.17 ft (1.58 m) with the standard iron-ballasted keel and 3.92 ft (1.19 m) with the optional longer shoal draft lead-ballasted keel. About 90 were built with the shoal draft keel. It has a hull speed of 6.55 kn (12.13 km/h).

The boat was initially fitted with a Japanese Yanmar YSE diesel engine and later a Yanmar 1GM model.

The spacious interior includes a 5.8 cubic foot icebox.

In 1977 a new rudder was introduced. It has an additional 2 in (5.1 cm) on the leading edge for better helm balance. It can be retrofitted to older boats. In 1980 the mast was changed from a Proctor to an Isomat section along with small interior improvements.

It has a masthead sloop rig.
