= CS 50 =

Sailboat class

Development
- Designer: Germán Frers
- Location: Canada
- Year: 1987
- No. built: one
- Builder: CS Yachts
- Name: CS 50

Boat
- Displacement: 27,557 lb (12,500 kg)
- Draft: 8.67 ft (2.64 m)

Hull
- Type: Monohull
- Construction: Fibreglass
- LOA: 49.86 ft (15.20 m)
- LWL: 38.38 ft (11.70 m)
- Beam: 14.16 ft (4.32 m)
- Engine: Westerbeke W-70 diesel engine

Hull appendages
- Keel: fin keel
- Ballast: 12,125 lb (5,500 kg)
- Rudder: internally-mounted spade-type rudder

Rig
- General: Masthead sloop or cutter rig

Sails
- Total sail area: 1,390 sq ft (129 m^{2})

Racing
- PHRF: 84 (average)

The CS 50 is a Canadian sailboat, that was designed by Germán Frers.

== Production ==
The boat was built by CS Yachts in Canada, with one example completed in 1987. The design went out of production in 1988.

== Design ==
The CS 50 is a recreational keelboat, built predominantly of fibreglass. It has a masthead sloop rig or can be optionally cutter rigged. It fits an internally-mounted spade-type rudder and a fixed fin keel, displaces 27,557 lb (12,500 kg) and carries 12,125 lb (5,500 kg) of lead ballast.

The boat has a draft of 8.67 ft (2.64 m) with the standard keel and 6.67 ft (2.03 m) with the optional shoal draft keel. No shoal draft examples were built, but the builder advertised it as an option.

The boat is fitted with a Westerbeke W-70 diesel engine. The fuel tank holds 74 U.S. gallons (280 L; 62 imp gal) and the fresh water tank has a capacity of 134 U.S. gallons (510 L; 112 imp gal).

The boat has a PHRF racing average handicap of 84 with a high of 84 and low of 84. It has a hull speed of 8.3 kn (15.37 km/h).

== See also ==
- List of sailing boat types
