= Arcadia 30 =

Sailboat class

Development
- Designer: Tony Castro
- Location: France
- Year: 1983
- No. built: 600
- Builder: Jeanneau
- Role: Cruiser
- Name: Arcadia 30

Boat
- Displacement: 6,175 lb (2,801 kg)
- Draft: 5.67 ft (1.73 m)

Hull
- Type: monohull
- Construction: fiberglass
- LOA: 29.53 ft (9.00 m)
- LWL: 24.44 ft (7.45 m)
- Beam: 10.33 ft (3.15 m)
- Engine: inboard 8 to 15 hp (6 to 11 kW) diesel engine

Hull appendages
- Keel: fin keel
- Ballast: 2,688 lb (1,219 kg)
- Rudder: skeg-mounted rudder

Rig
- Rig type: Bermuda rig
- I foretriangle height: 37.16 ft (11.33 m)
- J foretriangle base: 11.67 ft (3.56 m)
- P mainsail luff: 32.16 ft (9.80 m)
- E mainsail foot: 10.00 ft (3.05 m)

Sails
- Sailplan: masthead sloop
- Mainsail area: 161 sq ft (15.0 m^{2})
- Jib/genoa area: 171 sq ft (15.9 m^{2})
- Spinnaker area: 861 sq ft (80.0 m^{2})
- Other sails: genoa: 327 sq ft (30.4 m^{2}) solent: 249 sq ft (23.1 m^{2}) storm jib: 52 sq ft (4.8 m^{2})
- Upwind sail area: 489 sq ft (45.4 m^{2})
- Downwind sail area: 1,023 sq ft (95.0 m^{2})

The Arcadia 30, or just Arcadia, is a French sailboat that was designed by Tony Castro as a cruiser and first built in 1983.

The boat is a development of the Sun Fast 1/2 Ton International Offshore Rule Half Ton class racer and was later developed into the 1987 Sun Dream 28 and Sun Way 28.

== Production ==
The design was built by Jeanneau in France, from 1983 until 1986, with 600 boats completed.

== Design ==
The Arcadia 30 is a recreational keelboat, built predominantly of polyester fiberglass, with wood trim. The hull is solid fiberglass and the deck is balsa-cored fiberglass. It has a masthead sloop rig, with a deck-stepped mast, two sets of unswept spreaders and aluminum spars with 1X19 stainless steel wire rigging. The hull has a raked stem, a reverse transom, a skeg-mounted rudder controlled by a tiller with an extension and a fixed fin keel or optional stub keel and retractable centerboard. The fin keel version displaces 6,175 lb (2,801 kg) and carries 2,688 lb (1,219 kg) of cast iron ballast, while the centerboard version displaces 6,835 lb (3,100 kg) and carries 2,912 lb (1,321 kg) of ballast, comprising cast iron exterior ballast and a steel centerboard.

The keel-equipped version of the boat has a draft of 5.67 ft (1.73 m), while the centerboard-equipped version has a draft of 6.50 ft (1.98 m) with the centerboard extended and 3.58 ft (1.09 m) with it retracted, allowing operation in shallow water.

The boat is fitted with an inboard diesel engine of 8 to 15 hp (6 to 11 kW) for docking and maneuvering. The fuel tank holds 7 U.S. gallons (26 L; 5.8 imp gal) and the fresh water tank has a capacity of 24 U.S. gallons (91 L; 20 imp gal).

The design has sleeping accommodation for six people, with a double "V"-berth in the bow cabin, an U-shaped settee in the main cabin and an aft cabin with a double berth on the port side. The galley is located on the port side just forward of the companionway ladder. The galley is L-shaped and is equipped with a two-burner stove, a 7.9 U.S. gallons (30 L; 6.6 imp gal) ice box and a sink. A navigation station is opposite the galley, on the starboard side. The head is located just aft of the navigation station on the starboard side. Cabin headroom is 68 in (173 cm).

For sailing downwind the design may be equipped with a symmetrical spinnaker of 861 sq ft (80.0 m^{2}).

The design has a hull speed of 6.62 kn (12.26 km/h).

== Operational history ==
In a 2000 review in Practical Sailor, Darrell Nicholson wrote, "overall the Jeanneau Arcadia surprised us. We were expecting a boat comparable in quality to mid-line American production boats; we found the Jeanneau to be somewhat better in construction and in many details. Being fond of tradition, we have a problem with the style of most of the Jeanneaus, including the Arcadia, but ultimately style is a tenuous criticism of a boat, unless it is truly ugly."

== See also ==
- List of sailing boat types
