= CS 395 =

Sailboat class

Development
- Designer: Germán Frers
- Location: Canada
- Year: 1979
- Builder: CS Yachts
- Name: CS 395

Boat
- Displacement: 12,786 lb (5,800 kg)
- Draft: 7.28 ft (2.22 m)

Hull
- Type: Monohull
- Construction: Fibreglass
- LOA: 40.15 ft (12.24 m)
- LWL: 31.13 ft (9.49 m)
- Beam: 12.70 ft (3.87 m)
- Engine: Pathfinder 48 hp (36 kW) diesel motor

Hull appendages
- Keel: fin keel
- Ballast: 5,644 lb (2,560 kg)
- Rudder: skeg-mounted rudder

Rig
- General: Masthead sloop
- I foretriangle height: 55.21 ft (16.83 m)
- J foretriangle base: 15.09 ft (4.60 m)
- P mainsail luff: 46.42 ft (14.15 m)
- E mainsail foot: 14.23 ft (4.34 m)

Sails
- Mainsail area: 330.28 sq ft (30.684 m^{2})
- Jib/genoa area: 416.56 sq ft (38.700 m^{2})
- Total sail area: 746.84 sq ft (69.384 m^{2})

The CS 395 is a Canadian sailboat, that was designed by Germán Frers and first built in 1979.

== Production ==
The boat was built by CS Yachts in Canada, but is now out of production.

== Design ==
The CS 395 is a small recreational keelboat, built predominantly of fibreglass. It has a masthead sloop rig, a skeg-mounted rudder and a fixed fin keel. It displaces 12,786 lb (5,800 kg) and carries 5,644 lb (2,560 kg) of ballast.

The boat has a draft of 7.28 ft (2.22 m) with the standard keel and 5.8 ft (1.8 m) with the optional shoal draft keel.

The boat is fitted with a Pathfinder diesel engine of 48 hp (36 kW). The fuel tank holds 53 U.S. gallons (200 L; 44 imp gal) and the fresh water tank has a capacity of 106 U.S. gallons (400 L; 88 imp gal).

The boat has a hull speed of 7.48 kn (13.85 km/h).

== See also ==
- List of sailing boat types

Similar sailboats

- C&C 115
