= C&C 40 =

Sailboat class

C&C 40 Crusader
Development
- Designer: C&C Design
- Location: Canada
- Year: 1968
- Builder: Belleville Marine Yards (C&C Yachts)
- Name: C&C 40 Crusader

Boat
- Displacement: 18,225 lb (8,267 kg)
- Draft: 9.08 ft (2.77 m) with centreboard down, 4.50 ft (1.37 m) with centreboard up

Hull
- Type: Monohull
- Construction: Fiberglass
- LOA: 39.67 ft (12.09 m)
- LWL: 28.67 ft (8.74 m)
- Beam: 11.16 ft (3.40 m)
- Engine: Universal Atomic 4 gasoline engine

Hull appendages
- Keel: long keel and centreboard
- Ballast: lead
- Rudder: internally-mounted spade-type rudder

Rig
- Rig type: Bermuda rig
- I foretriangle height: 48.00 ft (14.63 m)
- J foretriangle base: 15.50 ft (4.72 m)
- P mainsail luff: 42.00 ft (12.80 m)
- E mainsail foot: 17.30 ft (5.27 m)

Sails
- Sailplan: Masthead sloop
- Mainsail area: 363.30 sq ft (33.752 m^{2})
- Jib/genoa area: 372.00 sq ft (34.560 m^{2})
- Total sail area: 735.30 sq ft (68.312 m^{2})

Racing
- PHRF: 120 (average)

The C&C 40 is a series of Canadian sailboats, that were all designed by C&C Design and first built in 1968.

== Production ==
The series were all built by C&C Yachts in Canada, but all models are now all out of production.

== Design ==
The C&C 40 series are all recreational keelboats, built predominantly of fiberglass, with wood trim. They all have masthead sloop rigs and internally-mounted spade-type rudders.

The C&C 40 Crusader and 40-1 were related designs, although there were many variations produced on the basic designs. The 40-2 and its variants are a completely different design.

== Variants ==
C&C 40 Crusader
This model was designed by C&C Design, introduced in 1968 and built until 1971 at Belleville Marine Yards, which became part of C&C Yachts during the production run. C&C Yachts Limited officially formed on 26 September 1969. The boat design has a length overall of 39.67 ft (12.1 m), a waterline length of 28.67 ft (8.7 m), displaces 18,225 lb (8,267 kg) and has a long keel and centreboard. The boat has a draft of 9.08 ft (2.77 m) with the centreboard extended and 4.50 ft (1.37 m) with it retracted. The boat is fitted with a Universal Atomic 4 gasoline engine. The boat has a PHRF racing average handicap of 120 with a high of 102 and low of 132. It has a hull speed of 7.17 kn (13.28 km/h).
C&C 40-1
This model was based upon the C&C 40 Crusader, but with the rudder moved to the long keel and a small bowsprit added. It was designed by C&C Design and introduced in 1970. It has a length overall of 39.58 ft (12.1 m), a waterline length of 28.70 ft (8.7 m), displaces 18,790 lb (8,523 kg) and carries 7,910 lb (3,588 kg) of ballast. The boat has a draft of 7.00 ft (2.13 m) with the standard keel fitted. The boat is fitted with an inboard engine. The fuel tank holds 26 U.S. gallons (98 L; 22 imp gal) and the fresh water tank has a capacity of 100 U.S. gallons (380 L; 83 imp gal). The boat has a PHRF racing average handicap of 126. It has a hull speed of 7.18 kn (13.30 km/h).
C&C 40-2
This model was designed by Robert W. Ball of C&C Design, introduced in 1978, and at nearly 200 launched, was one of C&C's most successful models. It was an entirely new design from the earlier models, sharing only the C&C 40 name. It has a length overall of 39.58 ft (12.1 m), a waterline length of 31.50 ft (9.6 m), displaces 17,000 lb (7,711 kg) and carries 7,910 lb (3,588 kg) of ballast. The boat has a draft of 7.00 ft (2.13 m) with the standard keel and 7.5 ft (2.3 m) with the optional deep draft keel. An optional version was fitted with a stub keel and a centreboard. That model has a draft of 8.50 ft (2.59 m) with the centreboard extended and 4.75 ft (1.45 m) with it retracted. The boat is fitted with a Westerbeke diesel engine. The fuel tank holds 20 U.S. gallons (76 L; 17 imp gal) and the fresh water tank has a capacity of 60 U.S. gallons (230 L; 50 imp gal). There was also a tall mast option, with a mast about 2.0 ft (0.61 m) higher. The standard keel version has a PHRF racing average handicap of 93, the centreboard version has an average handicap of 102, the deep keel version has an average handicap of 90, the tall mast version has an average handicap of 93 and the tall mast/deep keel combination has an average handicap of 90. All versions have hull speeds of 7.52 kn (13.93 km/h).
C&C 40-2 AC
This "aft cabin" version of the C&C 40-2 was designed by Robert Ball, of C&C Design and introduced in 1977. It has a length overall of 39.58 ft (12.1 m), a waterline length of 31.50 ft (9.6 m), displaces 17,100 lb (7,756 kg) and carries 7,910 lb (3,588 kg) of ballast. The boat has a draft of 7.00 ft (2.13 m) with the standard keel. The boat is fitted with a Westerbeke diesel engine. The boat has a PHRF racing average handicap of 93. It has a hull speed of 7.52 kn (13.93 km/h). In creating the aft cockpit the companion way steps were moved forward and the mainsheet traveller relocated from the coach house roof to the bridge deck. Keels available were a deep draft keel, shoal draft keel and a swing keel. There is an aft cabin that features a double berth on the port side. It is connected to the head by a door and the head has a second door to the main cabin. In the main cabin the gallery is located on the port side, with a large navigation station on the starboard side. In the main cabin there is a double berth and a pilot berth, along with a folding table. There is also a double berth in the bow. The design has a "T" cockpit with the wheel on a pedestal and inboard genoa tracks. An anchor locker is located in the bow.

== Operational history ==
In a review of the 40-2 Michael McGoldrick wrote, "The C&C 40 ... is one of the bigger boats made by C&C over the years, and it traces its origins back to the company's experience with a custom 40 foot racing boat. It is supposed to be a responsive boat that has a reputation for being quite fast in light airs. Down below is all the room you would expect from a 40 footer, and later boats featured an aft-cabin."

== See also ==
- List of sailing boat types

Similar sailboats

- Columbia 40
- CS 40
- Hunter 40
- Hunter 40.5
- Hunter 41
- Marlow-Hunter 40
