= Hunter 41 =

Sailboat class

Development
- Designer: Glenn Henderson
- Location: United States
- Year: 2004
- Builder: Hunter Marine
- Name: Hunter 41

Boat
- Displacement: 19,400 lb (8,800 kg)
- Draft: 6.5 ft (2.0 m)

Hull
- Type: Monohull
- Construction: Fiberglass
- LOA: 40.32 ft (12.29 m)
- LWL: 35.50 ft (10.82 m)
- Beam: 13.25 ft (4.04 m)
- Engine: Yanmar 40 hp (30 kW) diesel engine

Hull appendages
- Keel: fin keel
- Ballast: 6,506 lb (2,951 kg)
- Rudder: internally-mounted spade-type rudder

Rig
- Rig type: Bermuda rig
- I foretriangle height: 51.57 ft (15.72 m)
- J foretriangle base: 13.00 ft (3.96 m)
- P mainsail luff: 48.62 ft (14.82 m)
- E mainsail foot: 18.24 ft (5.56 m)

Sails
- Sailplan: Fractional B&R rigged sloop
- Mainsail area: 443.41 sq ft (41.194 m^{2})
- Jib/genoa area: 335.21 sq ft (31.142 m^{2})
- Total sail area: 778.62 sq ft (72.336 m^{2})

The Hunter 41 is an American sailboat that was designed by Glenn Henderson as a cruiser and first built in 2004.

== Production ==
The design was built by Hunter Marine in the United States between 2004 and 2012, but it is now out of production.

The design was built in two variants, the Aft Cockpit (AC) and the Deck Salon (DS) models.

== Design ==
Henderson explained the design goals, "I wanted a boat that would have all the systems and conveniences you'd expect in a house and also be capable of long-distance offshore passages."

The Hunter 41 is a recreational keelboat, built predominantly of fiberglass. It has a fractional sloop B&R rig, a nearly plumb stem, a walk-through reverse transom with a swimming platform and folding ladder, an internally mounted spade-type rudder controlled by a wheel and a fixed deep fin keel or optional wing keel. It displaces 19,400 lb (8,800 kg) and carries 6,506 lb (2,951 kg) of ballast with the deep keel, 6,612 lb (2,999 kg) with the wing keel.

The boat has a draft of 6.50 ft (1.98 m) with the standard deep keel and 5.00 ft (1.52 m) with the optional shoal draft keel.

Factory standard equipment included a 110% roller furling genoa, four two-speed self tailing winches, marine VHF radio, knotmeter, depth sounder, AM/FM radio and CD player, dual anchor rollers, hot and cold water cockpit shower, laminate cabin sole, two fully enclosed heads with showers, private forward and aft cabins, a dinette table that converts to a berth, complete set of kitchen dishes for six, microwave oven, dual stainless steel sinks, two-burner gimbaled liquid petroleum gas stove and oven and six life jackets. Factory options included a Bimini top, dodger, freezer, a double aft cabin, air conditioning, spinnaker and rigging, mast furling mainsail, a flat panel TV and DVD player and leather cushions.

== Operational history ==
Sail magazine's Bill Springer noted the launch of the DS model in the summer of 2005 for the 2006 model year. He wrote that "it seems only natural that the Hunter 41DS takes advantage of a deck-saloon layout to achieve a more open and airy accommodations plan. The DS has large elevated windows for panoramic views and a whopping 6-foot, 10-inch headroom in the saloon."

The DS model was named Cruising World's 2006 Best Production Cruiser 40 to 44 Feet in its Boat of the Year competition.

Cruising World reviewer Nim Marsh praised the DS model's layout and spacious accommodations, but was most impressed with the boat's performance on a review cruise with the designer: "we cracked off in very light air, heading for the unprotected waters of the bay. I was visibly surprised when the boat-with a modest 17.2 sail area-to-displacement ratio--responded dramatically, accelerating as the optional Selden in-mast furling main and Furlex roller-furling genoa filled. Henderson had been watching for my reaction, and when he got what he wanted, he said, "Sail area/displacement doesn't always tell the story. Right off the bat, I try to make my hulls easily driven. Of course," he added with a wry smile, "they put three-bladed props on them, but I can't do anything about that." Marsh concluded, "...for me, it was the Hunter's performance that stood out, which I reiterated to Henderson. "My primary objectives were high stability, boat speed, a good motion in a seaway, and reactivity or responsiveness," he replied. "These four attributes make up what is commonly known as 'performance.'"

== Variants ==
Hunter 41 AC
This model was introduced in 2004 and produced until 2010. It features a conventional aft cockpit and below decks accommodation. The boat is fitted with a Japanese Yanmar diesel engine of 40 hp (30 kW). The fuel tank holds 36 U.S. gallons (140 L; 30 imp gal) and the fresh water tank has a capacity of 100 U.S. gallons (380 L; 83 imp gal).
Hunter 41 DS
This model was introduced in 2006 and produced until 2012. It features a raised cabin coach house roof to increase headroom to over 7 ft (213 cm) and is fitted with additional portlights to increase light and visibility. The boat is fitted with a Japanese Yanmar diesel engine of 56 hp (42 kW). The fuel tank holds 51 U.S. gallons (190 L; 42 imp gal) and the fresh water tank has a capacity of 140 U.S. gallons (530 L; 120 imp gal).

== See also ==
- List of sailing boat types

Similar sailboats

- C&C 40
- Columbia 40
- CS 40
- Hunter 40
- Hunter 40.5
- Marlow-Hunter 40
