= CS 22 =

Sailboat class

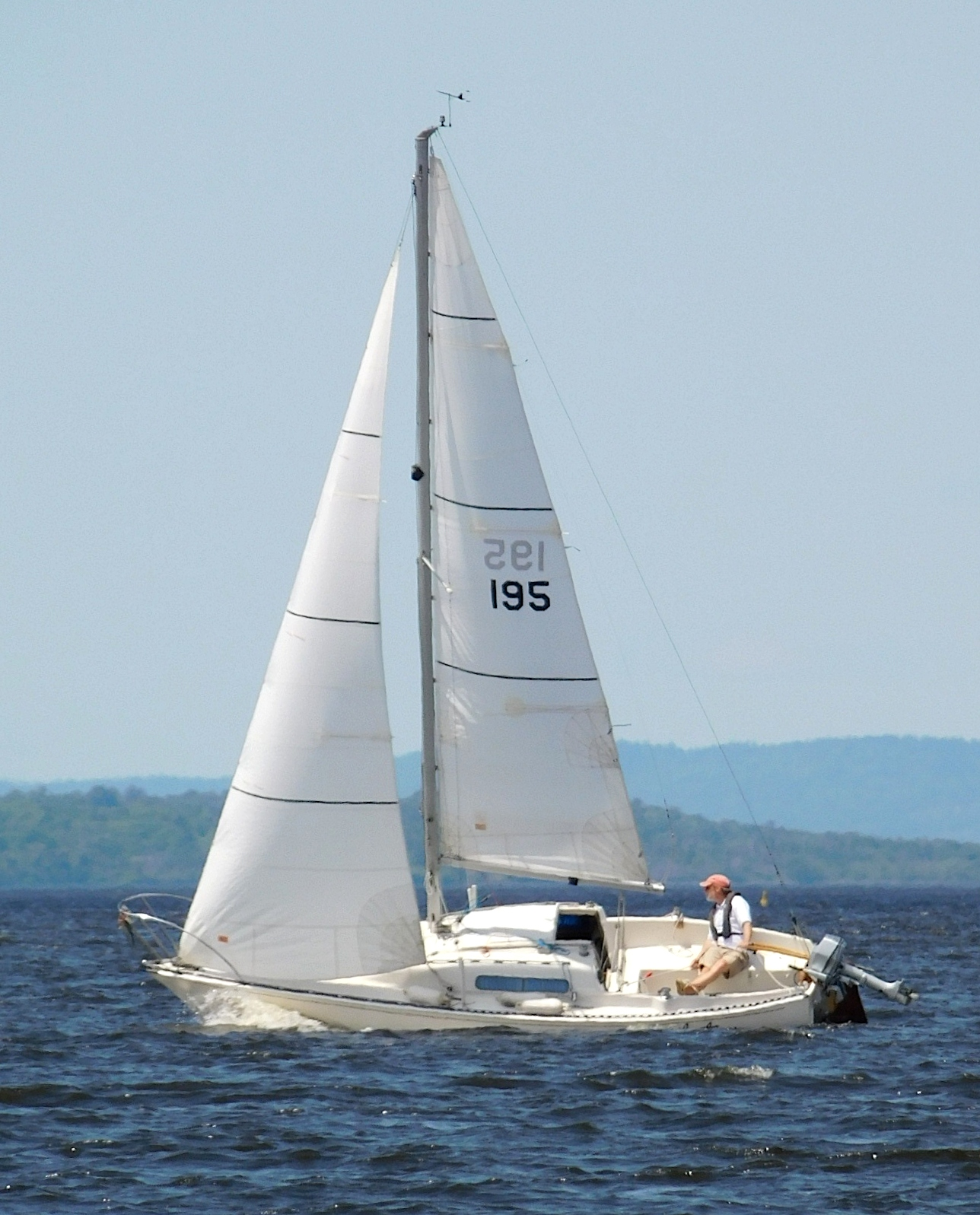

Development
- Designer: John A. Butler
- Location: Canada
- Year: 1971
- No. built: 500
- Builder: CS Yachts
- Name: CS 22

Boat
- Displacement: 2,200 lb (998 kg)
- Draft: 5.00 ft (1.52 m) with centreboard down

Hull
- Type: Monohull
- Construction: Fibreglass
- LOA: 21.58 ft (6.58 m)
- LWL: 17.50 ft (5.33 m)
- Beam: 8.00 ft (2.44 m)
- Engine: outboard motor

Hull appendages
- Keel: Centreboard
- Ballast: 1,100 lb (499 kg)
- Rudder: Transom-mounted rudder

Rig
- General: Fractional rigged sloop Masthead sloop
- I foretriangle height: 26.50 ft (8.08 m)
- J foretriangle base: 8.30 ft (2.53 m)
- P mainsail luff: 24.00 ft (7.32 m)
- E mainsail foot: 7.00 ft (2.13 m)

Sails
- Mainsail area: 84.00 sq ft (7.804 m^{2})
- Jib/genoa area: 109.98 sq ft (10.217 m^{2})
- Total sail area: 193.98 sq ft (18.021 m^{2})

The CS 22 is a Canadian trailerable sailboat, that was designed by John A. Butler and first built in 1971. The design is out of production.

== Production ==
The boat was built by CS Yachts in Canada. The company produced 500 CS 22s between 1971 and 1976, when production ended.

== Design ==
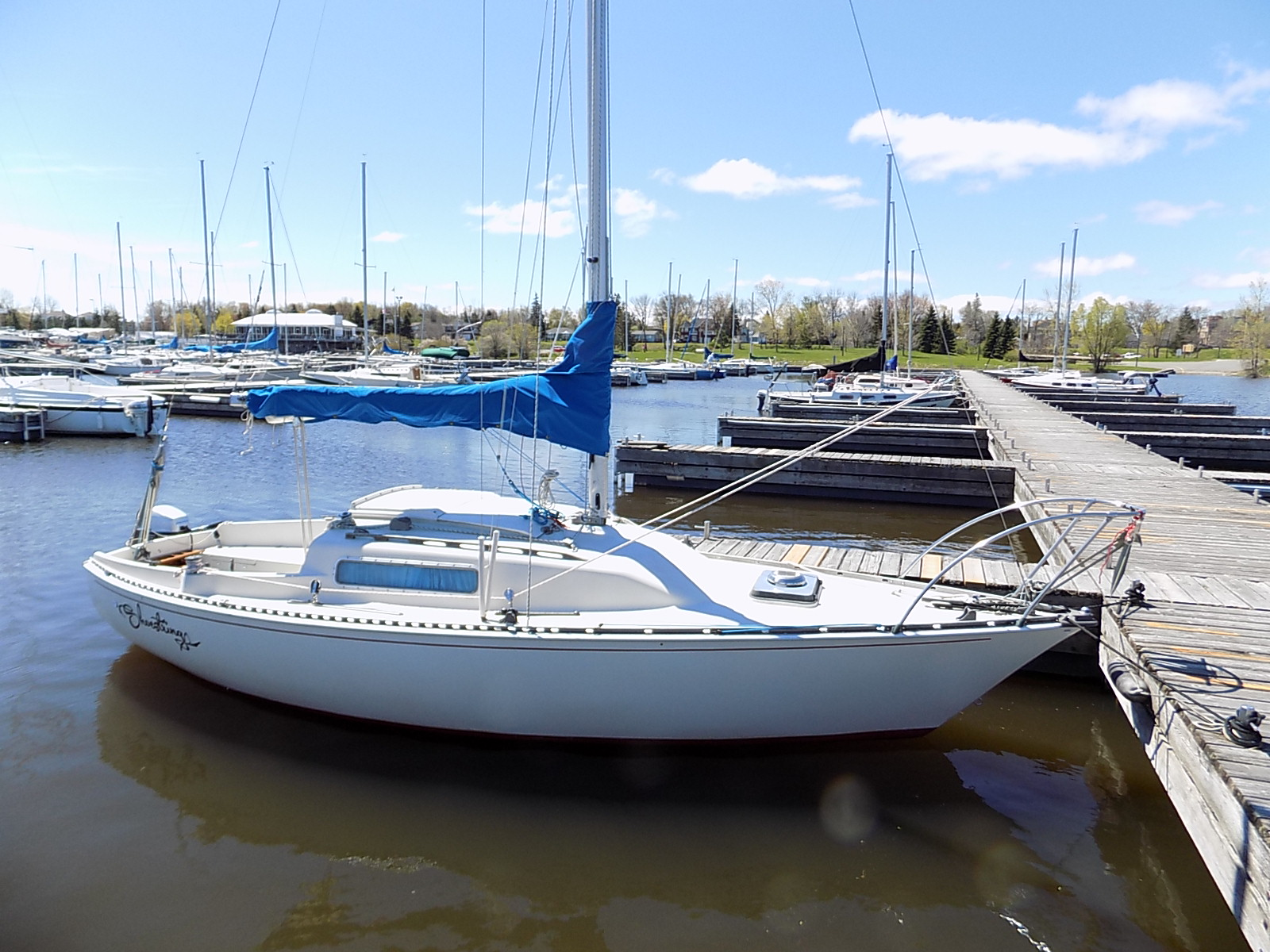
CS 22

The CS 22 is a small recreational sailboat, built predominantly of fibreglass, with wood trim. It has a fractional sloop rig, a transom-hung rudder and a retractable centreboard with a stub keel. It displaces 2,200 lb (998 kg) and carries 1,100 lb (499 kg) of ballast.

The boat has a draft of 5.00 ft (1.52 m) with the centreboard down and 2.00 ft (0.61 m) with the centreboard up.

The design has sleeping accommodation for four people, with a double "V"-berth in the bow cabin, a drop-down dinette table berth and a quarter berth on the starboard side, aft. The galley is located on the starboard side just forward of the companionway ladder. The galley is equipped with a two-burner stove and a sink. There is a small hanging lock forward of the galley. The head under the bow "V"- berth and is a portable type.

The boat has a hull speed of 5.61 kn (10.39 km/h).

== Operational history ==
In a 2010 review, Steve Henkel wrote,

"British naval architect John Butler was asked by Canadian Sailcraft Co. (CS) to draw a small trailerable sailboat 'suitable for light-weather performance.' The centerboard is pivoted in a slot in an unusually stubby external ballast keel, which lowers the center of gravity for added stability, keeps the board from encroaching on cabin space, and, it is said, takes the weight of the boat when she is trailered or stored. But we wonder whether the boat can be balanced on her stub keel when grounded by a falling tide. Best features: Except for the rudderhead rising above the deck aft, her sleek looks seem better than average to us. Worst features: The boat has shallow ballast and slack bilges, which may provide low wetted surface for light-air speed but will also make her more tender than average. The centerboard slot in the keel, open on the aft edge to house the board when up, may cause eddies, which will tend to slow the boat down, The vertical lifting rudder slides up and down in an aluminum frame. It is supposed to shear a retaining pin and swing aft if it hits an underwater object. Like many complicated designs at sea, it may or may not work when you need it most. Why not just a conventional swivel?"

== See also ==
- List of sailing boat types

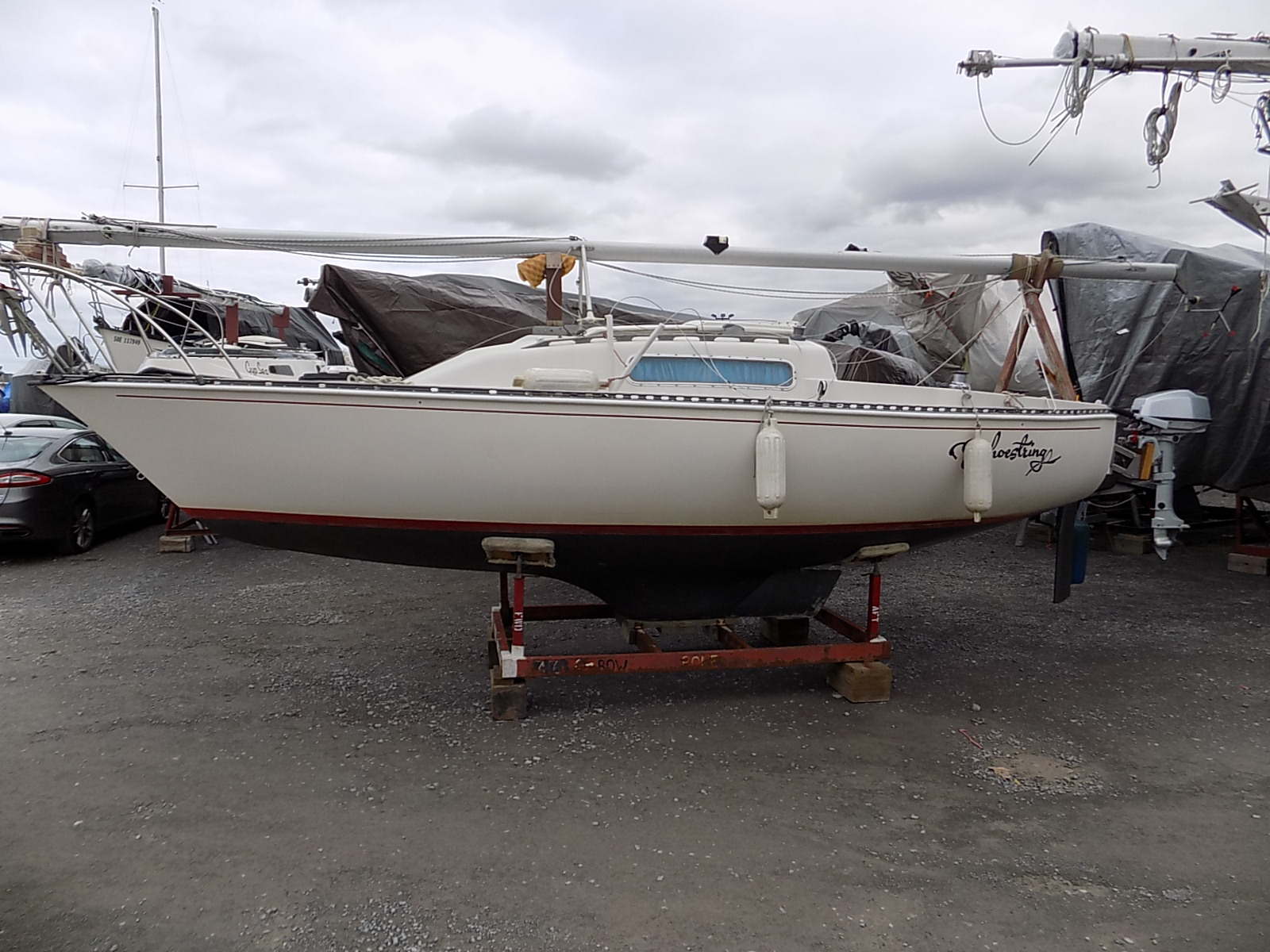
CS 22 on its storage cradle, showing the keel and centreboard arrangement

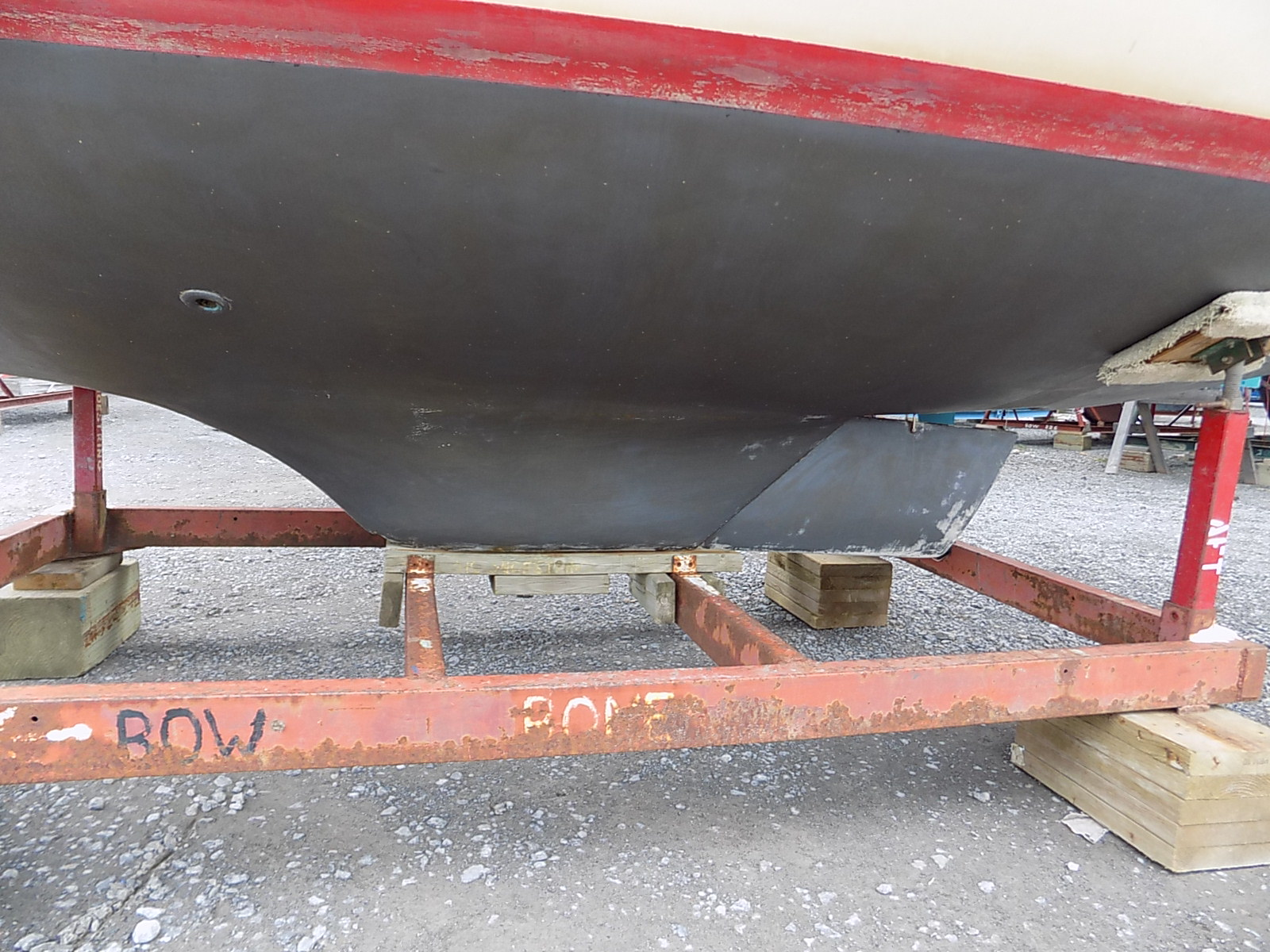
CS 22 keel and centreboard in folded position
