= CS 36 Merlin =

Sailboat class

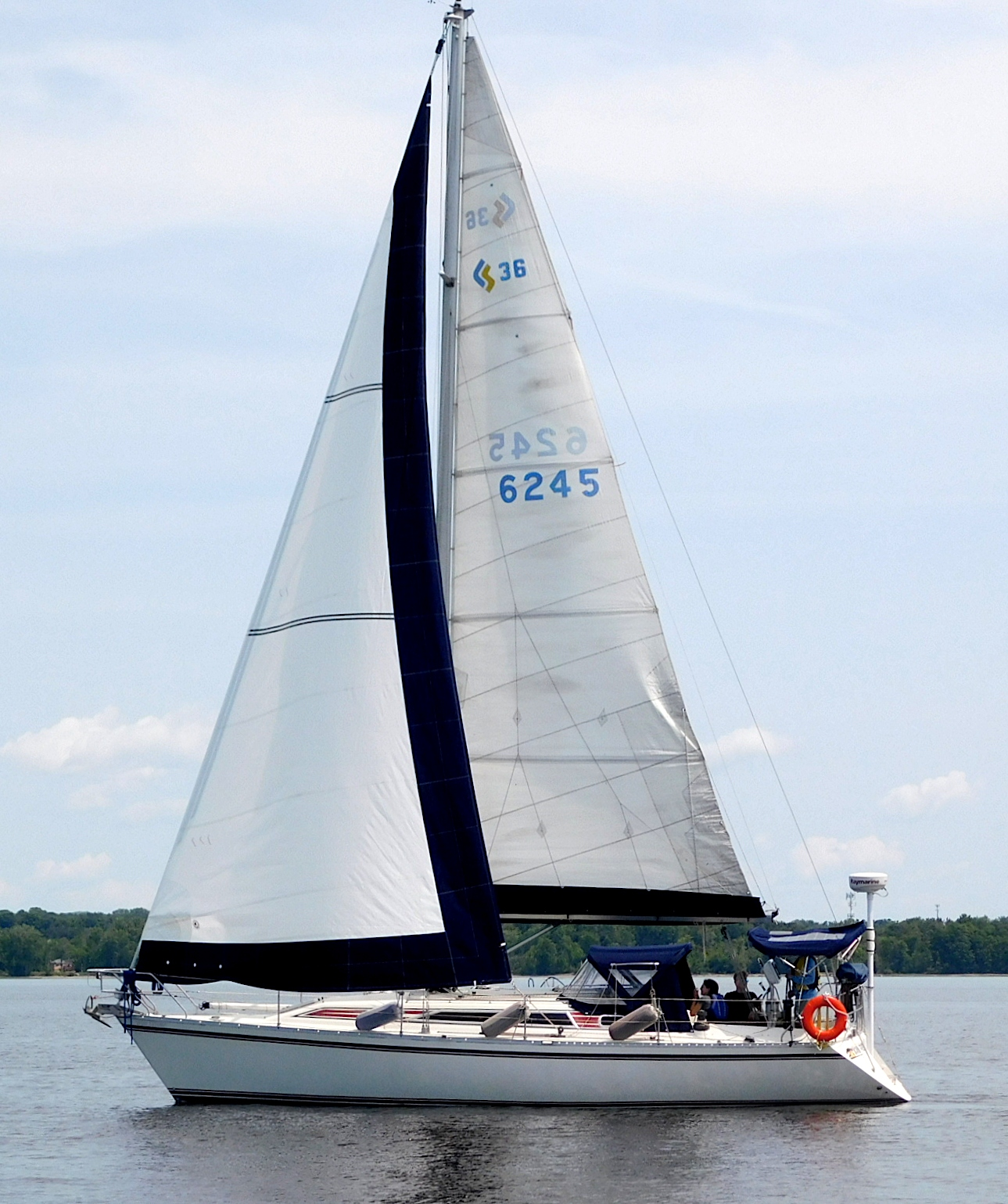

Development
- Designer: Tony Castro
- Location: Canada
- Year: 1986
- No. built: 100
- Builder: CS Yachts
- Name: CS 36 Merlin

Boat
- Displacement: 13,000 lb (5,897 kg)
- Draft: 6.25 ft (1.91 m)

Hull
- Type: Monohull
- Construction: Fibreglass
- LOA: 36.00 ft (10.97 m)
- LWL: 29.17 ft (8.89 m)
- Beam: 11.50 ft (3.51 m)
- Engine: Volvo Penta diesel engine 25 hp (19 kW)

Hull appendages
- Keel: fin keel
- Ballast: 5,590 lb (2,536 kg)
- Rudder: internally-mounted spade-type/ rudder

Rig
- General: Masthead sloop
- I foretriangle height: 45.50 ft (13.87 m)
- J foretriangle base: 14.30 ft (4.36 m)
- P mainsail luff: 39.50 ft (12.04 m)
- E mainsail foot: 14.30 ft (4.36 m)

Sails
- Mainsail area: 282.43 sq ft (26.239 m^{2})
- Jib/genoa area: 325.33 sq ft (30.224 m^{2})
- Total sail area: 607.75 sq ft (56.462 m^{2})

Racing
- PHRF: 141 (average)

The CS 36 Merlin is a Canadian sailboat, that was designed by Tony Castro and first built in 1986. The design is out of production.

== Production ==
The boat was built by CS Yachts in Canada, who completed 100 examples between 1986 and 1990.

The CS 36 Merlin was produced for almost a year side-by-side with the CS 36, which then became known as the CS 36 Traditional. After the production overlap the Merlin replaced the CS 36 in company's line.

About 20 of the 100 Merlins built were supplied to charter operators for their fleets.

== Design ==
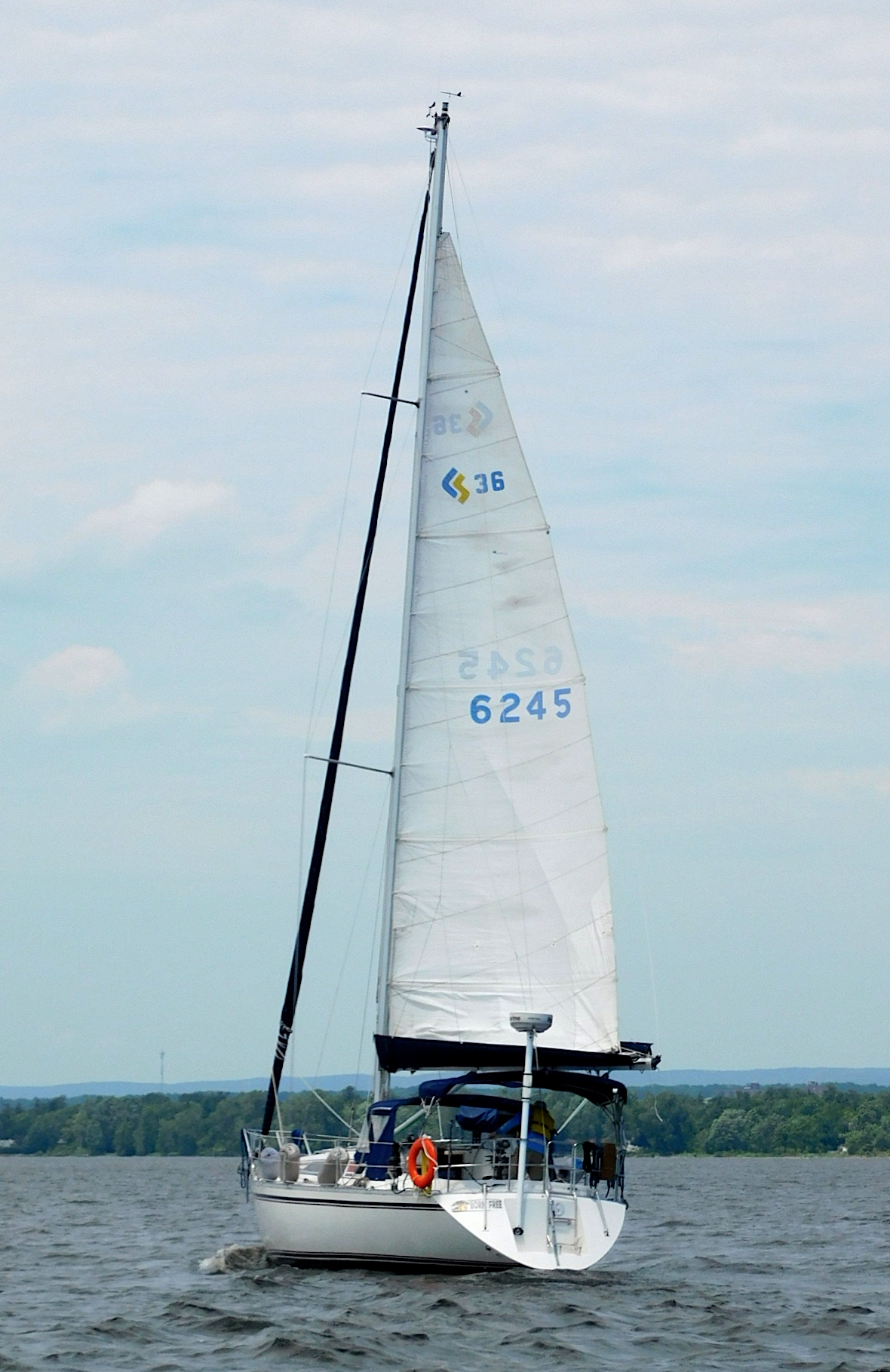
CS 36 Merlin showing transom configuration

The CS 36 Merlin is a recreational keelboat, built predominantly of vacuum bag moulded fibreglass or Kevlar with a balsa wood core above the waterline. It has a masthead sloop rig, an internally-mounted spade-type rudder and a fixed fin keel. It displaces 13,000 lb (5,897 kg) and carries 5,590 lb (2,536 kg) of ballast.

The boat has a draft of 6.25 ft (1.91 m) with the standard keel and 5.00 ft (1.52 m) with the optional wing keel.

The boat is fitted with a Swedish Volvo Penta diesel engine of 25 hp (19 kW) as standard equipment. The fuel tank holds 40 U.S. gallons (150 L; 33 imp gal) and the fresh water tank has a capacity of 70 U.S. gallons (260 L; 58 imp gal).

The boat was available with a long list of options, including a Kevlar or fibreglass hull, a swim platform or conventional transom; a 25 hp (19 kW), 28 hp (21 kW) diesel engine or a 43 hp (32 kW) turbocharged engine, a tall mast or regular mast and by the time production ended in 1990 there were four keel configurations: shoal, wing, deep and performance bulb. As a result of the long options list, no two boats outside the charter fleets were built in the same configuration.

The boat has a PHRF racing average handicap of 141 with a high of 141 and low of 141. It has a hull speed of 7.24 kn (13.41 km/h).

== See also ==
- List of sailing boat types
