= Sun Dream 28 =

Sailboat class

Development
- Designer: Tony Castro
- Location: France
- Year: 1987
- No. built: 407
- Builder: Jeanneau
- Role: Cruiser
- Name: Sun Dream 28

Boat
- Displacement: 5,936 lb (2,693 kg)
- Draft: 5.37 ft (1.64 m)

Hull
- Type: monohull
- Construction: fiberglass
- LOA: 29.50 ft (8.99 m)
- LWL: 24.58 ft (7.49 m)
- Beam: 10.58 ft (3.22 m)
- Engine: inboard 18 hp (13 kW) diesel engine

Hull appendages
- Keel: fin keel
- Ballast: 2,425 lb (1,100 kg)
- Rudder: spade-type rudder

Rig
- Rig type: Bermuda rig
- I foretriangle height: 35.27 ft (10.75 m)
- J foretriangle base: 11.71 ft (3.57 m)
- P mainsail luff: 30.19 ft (9.20 m)
- E mainsail foot: 10.83 ft (3.30 m)

Sails
- Sailplan: masthead sloop
- Mainsail area: 184 sq ft (17.1 m^{2})
- Jib/genoa area: 157 sq ft (14.6 m^{2})
- Spinnaker area: 684 sq ft (63.5 m^{2})
- Other sails: genoa: 300 sq ft (28 m^{2}) solent: 249 sq ft (23.1 m^{2}) storm jib: 53 sq ft (4.9 m^{2})
- Upwind sail area: 484 sq ft (45.0 m^{2})
- Downwind sail area: 868 sq ft (80.6 m^{2})

The Sun Dream 28 is a French sailboat that was designed by Tony Castro as a cruiser and first built in 1987.

The Sun Dream 28 is a development of the Arcadia 30 and was further developed into the Sun Way 28 in 1991.

== Production ==
The design was built by Jeanneau in France, from 1987 until 1991, with 407 boats delivered.

== Design ==
The Sun Dream 28 is a recreational keelboat, built predominantly of fiberglass, with wood trim. It has a masthead sloop rig, with a deck-stepped mast, a single set of swept spreaders and aluminum spars with 1X19 stainless steel wire rigging. The hull has a raked stem, a reverse transom, an internally mounted spade-type rudder controlled by a tiller and a fixed fin keel or stub keel and retractable centerboard. The fin keel model displaces 5,936 lb (2,693 kg) and carries 2,425 lb (1,100 kg) of ballast, while the centerboard version displaces 6,398 lb (2,902 kg) and carries 2,800 lb (1,270 kg) of ballast.

The keel-equipped version of the boat has a draft of 5.37 ft (1.64 m), while the centerboard-equipped version has a draft of 6.40 ft (1.95 m) with the centerboard extended and 3.40 ft (1.04 m) with it retracted, allowing operation in shallow water.

The boat is fitted with an inboard diesel engine of 18 hp (13 kW) for docking and maneuvering. The fuel tank holds 7.1 U.S. gallons (27 L; 5.9 imp gal), the fresh water tank has a capacity of 26.4 U.S. gallons (100 L; 22.0 imp gal) and the hot water heater has a capacity of 19.8 U.S. gallons (75 L; 16.5 imp gal).

The design's interior typically has sleeping accommodation for six people, with a double "V"-berth in the bow cabin, an L-shaped settee and a straight settee in the main cabin and an aft cabin with a double berth on the port side. The galley is located on the port side just forward of the companionway ladder. The galley is L-shaped and is equipped with a two-burner stove, an ice box and a sink. A navigation station is opposite the galley, on the starboard side. The head is located just aft of the navigation station on the starboard side. Cabin maximum headroom is 74 in (188 cm).

For sailing downwind the design may be equipped with a symmetrical spinnaker of 684 sq ft (63.5 m^{2}).

The design has a hull speed of 6.63 kn (12.28 km/h).

== Operational history ==
In a 1988 review in Cruising World described the design, "her interior arrangement also clouds the issue of her length overall. Designer Tony Castro has drawn in two double berths, one in the bow and the other aft to starboard. It opposes a fully private bath to port. The galley and chart table are both better-than-average size for a boat of this size and are positioned at the base of the companionway just aft of the settees and dining area. There's loads of light inside, mostly due to the effective, space-age ports that wrap around the coach roof. There are a variety of optional powerplants and, if so inclined, an owner can even specify a lifting keel."

== See also ==
- List of sailing boat types
