= C&C 131 =

Sailboat class

Development
- Designer: Tim Jackett
- Location: United States
- Year: 2008
- Builder: C&C Yachts
- Name: C&C 131

Boat
- Displacement: 16,975 lb (7,700 kg)
- Draft: 8.69 ft (2.65 m)

Hull
- Type: Monohull
- Construction: Fiberglass
- LOA: 42.98 ft (13.10 m)
- LWL: 37.24 ft (11.35 m)
- Beam: 12.96 ft (3.95 m)
- Engine: inboard engine

Hull appendages
- Keel: fin keel
- Ballast: 6,790 lb (3,080 kg)
- Rudder: internally-mounted spade-type rudder

Rig
- General: Fractional rigged sloop
- I foretriangle height: 60.38 ft (18.40 m)
- J foretriangle base: 17.25 ft (5.26 m)
- P mainsail luff: 38.00 ft (11.58 m)
- E mainsail foot: 19.36 ft (5.90 m)

Sails
- Mainsail area: 367.84 sq ft (34.173 m^{2})
- Jib/genoa area: 520.78 sq ft (48.382 m^{2})
- Total sail area: 888.62 sq ft (82.555 m^{2})

The C&C 131 is an American sailboat, that was designed by Tim Jackett and entered production in 2008.

== Production ==
The boat was built by C&C Yachts in the United States, but it is now out of production.

== Design ==
The C&C 131 is a small recreational keelboat, built predominantly of fiberglass. It has a fractional sloop rig, an internally-mounted spade-type rudder and a fixed fin keel. It displaces 16,975 lb (7,700 kg) and carries 6,790 lb (3,080 kg) of lead ballast.

The boat is fitted with an inboard engine. Its fuel tank holds 40 U.S. gallons (150 L; 33 imp gal) and the fresh water tank has a capacity of 90 U.S. gallons (340 L; 75 imp gal).

The boat has a hull speed of 8.18 kn (15.15 km/h).

== See also ==
- List of sailing boat types

Similar sailboats

- CS 44
- Hunter Passage 42
- Marlow-Hunter 42SS
