= Sun Shine 36 =

Sailboat class

Development
- Designer: Tony Castro
- Location: France
- Year: 1982
- Builder: Jeanneau
- Role: Racer

Boat
- Displacement: 11,872 lb (5,385 kg)
- Draft: 6.30 ft (1.92 m)

Hull
- Type: monohull
- Construction: fiberglass
- LOA: 36.42 ft (11.10 m)
- LWL: 30.67 ft (9.35 m)
- Beam: 12.63 ft (3.85 m)
- Engine: Yanmar diesel engine

Hull appendages
- Keel: fin keel
- Ballast: 4,850 lb (2,200 kg)
- Rudder: spade-type rudder

Rig
- Rig type: Bermuda rig
- I foretriangle height: 46.30 ft (14.11 m)
- J foretriangle base: 14.70 ft (4.48 m)
- P mainsail luff: 40.00 ft (12.19 m)
- E mainsail foot: 13.50 ft (4.11 m)

Sails
- Sailplan: masthead sloop
- Mainsail area: 270.00 sq ft (25.084 m^{2})
- Jib/genoa area: 340.31 sq ft (31.616 m^{2})
- Total sail area: 610.31 sq ft (56.700 m^{2})

The Sun Shine 36 is a French sailboat that was designed by Tony Castro as an International Offshore Rule One Ton class racer and first built in 1982.

The Sunshine 36 is the production version of an original prototype one ton racer and shares a hull design with the Regatta 39 and the Sun Shine 38, which has a longer transom.

== Production ==
The design was built by Jeanneau in France, starting in 1982, but it is now out of production.

== Design ==
The Sun Shine 36 is a racing keelboat, built predominantly of fiberglass, with wood trim and a masthead sloop rig. The hull has a raked stem, a reverse transom, an internally mounted spade-type rudder controlled by a wheel and a fixed fin keel or optional stub keel and centerboard.

The keel equipped version displaces 11,872 lb (5,385 kg) and carries 4,850 lb (2,200 kg) of ballast, while the centerboard equipped version displaces 12,544 lb (5,690 kg).

The keel-equipped version of the boat has a draft of 6.30 ft (1.92 m), while the centerboard-equipped version has a draft of 6.80 ft (2.07 m) with the centerboard extended and 4.10 ft (1.25 m) with it retracted, allowing operation in shallow water.

The boat is fitted with a Japanese Yanmar diesel engine for docking and maneuvering. The fuel tank holds 22 U.S. gallons (83 L; 18 imp gal) and the fresh water tank has a capacity of 53 U.S. gallons (200 L; 44 imp gal).

The design has sleeping accommodation for eight people, with a double "V"-berth in the bow cabin, an L-shaped settee and a straight settee in the main cabin and two aft cabins, each with double berths. The galley is located on the port side just forward of the companionway ladder. The galley is L-shaped and is equipped with a two-burner stove, ice box and a double sink. A navigation station is opposite the galley, on the starboard side. The head is located just aft of the bow cabin on the port side.

For sailing downwind the design may be equipped with a symmetrical spinnaker.

The design has a hull speed of 7.42 kn (13.74 km/h).

== Operational history ==
The boat was at one time supported by an active class club that organized racing events, the One Ton class, and more recently by the Jeanneau Owners Network.

== See also ==
- List of sailing boat types

Related development

- Regatta 39
- Sun Shine 38
