= Caprice 15 =

Sailboat class

Development
- Designer: Cuthbertson & Cassian
- Location: Canada
- Year: 1968
- Builder: Canadian Sailcraft
- Name: Caprice 15

Boat
- Displacement: 250 lb (113 kg)
- Draft: 3.83 ft (1.17 m) (centreboard down)

Hull
- Type: Monohull
- Construction: Fibreglass
- LOA: 14.67 ft (4.47 m)
- Beam: 6.04 ft (1.84 m)

Hull appendages
- Keel: Centreboard
- Rudder: transom-mounted rudder

Rig
- General: Fractional rigged sloop

Sails
- Total sail area: 123 sq ft (11.4 m^{2})

The Caprice 15 is a Canadian sailboat, that was designed by Cuthbertson & Cassian as a racer and first built in 1968.

== Production ==
The boat was built by Canadian Sailcraft in Canada, starting in 1968, but is now out of production.

== Design ==
The Caprice 15 is a small recreational sailing dinghy, built predominantly of fibreglass. It has a fractional sloop rig, a transom-hung rudder and a centreboard keel. It displaces 250 lb (113 kg) and has a length overall of 14.67 ft (4.47 m).

The boat has a draft of 3.83 ft (1.17 m) with the centreboard down and 0.58 ft (0.18 m) with the centreboard up.

== See also ==
- List of sailing boat types

Similar sailboats

- Albacore
- Laser 2
- Tanzer 14
- Tanzer 16
