= Marlow-Hunter 40 =

Sailboat class

Development
- Designer: Glenn Henderson
- Location: United States
- Year: 2012
- Builder: Hunter Marine
- Name: Marlow-Hunter 40

Boat
- Displacement: 19,700 lb (8,936 kg)
- Draft: 5.16 ft (1.57 m)

Hull
- Type: Monohull
- Construction: Fiberglass
- LOA: 41.25 ft (12.57 m)
- LWL: 36.00 ft (10.97 m)
- Beam: 13.16 ft (4.01 m)
- Engine: Yanmar diesel inboard motor

Hull appendages
- Keel: fin keel
- Ballast: 6,027 lb (2,734 kg)
- Rudder: internally-mounted spade-type rudder

Rig
- Rig type: Bermuda rig

Sails
- Sailplan: Fractional B&R rigged sloop
- Total sail area: 1,006.00 sq ft (93.460 m^{2})

The Marlow-Hunter 40 is an American sailboat that was designed by Glenn Henderson and first built in 2012.

The design was originally marketed by the manufacturer as the Hunter 40, but was commonly referred to as the 40-2, to differentiate it from the unrelated 1984 Hunter 40 design. When the company became Marlow-Hunter later in 2012, the boat's name was changed to the Marlow-Hunter 40.

== Production ==
The design has been built by Hunter Marine and later Marlow-Hunter in the United States, and remained in production through 2018.

== Design ==
The Marlow-Hunter 40 is a recreational keelboat, built predominantly of fiberglass. It has a fractional B&R rig with the mainsheet traveler mounted on a stainless steel arch, a plumb stem, a reverse transom with a fold-down swimming platform, an internally mounted spade-type rudder controlled by dual wheels and a fixed deep draft or shoal draft wing keel keel.

The boat has a draft of 6.67 ft (2.03 m) with the deep draft keel and 5.16 ft (1.57 m) with the shoal draft keel.

The boat is fitted with a Yanmar diesel engine of 40 or 54 hp (30 or 40 kW). The fuel tank holds 50 U.S. gallons (190 L; 42 imp gal) and the fresh water tank has a capacity of 90 U.S. gallons (340 L; 75 imp gal).

== Operational history ==
Charles Doane wrote a 2013 review of the design for Sail magazine, praising the boat's aesthetics, cockpit design, accommodations and sailing characteristics. He found fault with the under-sized galley sinks and stove and the limited stowage space in the cockpit. He concluded, "The Hunter 40 is pretty much all you could ever ask for in a modern mass-production cruising boat. She is attractive, affordable, comfortable and sails exceedingly well. Order this boat with a standard full-batten mainsail and a deep keel, and you will likely find your self giving many racer-cruisers a serious run for their money."

A 2013 review in Blue Water Sailing, the writer noted the boat's handling under power and sail, anchoring, fold-down transom and accommodations. The reviewer concluded, " With this new model, Hunter has borrowed some popular features from their previous designs—the overhead arch and B&R rig to name two–and added a handful of new features—the cabin sole, hard chines, hard top and fold down transom—to give the boat a fresh and appealing look. I envision the Hunter 40 as an excellent coastal cruising boat for a family or a couple, and like with most Hunters in this size range...."

== Variants ==
Marlow-Hunter 40 Deep Keel
This model carries 5,425 lb (2,461 kg) of ballast and has a draft of 6.67 ft (2.03 m) with the deep keel.
Marlow-Hunter 40 Shoal Keel
This model displaces 19,700 lb (8,936 kg), carries 6,027 lb (2,734 kg) of ballast and has a draft of 5.16 ft (1.57 m) with the shoal keel.

== See also ==
- List of sailing boat types

Similar sailboats

- C&C 40
- Columbia 40
- CS 40
- Hunter 40
- Hunter 40.5
- Hunter 41
