= Sun Odyssey 28.1 =

Sailboat class

Development
- Designer: Tony Castro
- Location: France
- Year: 1994
- Builder: Jeanneau
- Role: Cruiser
- Name: Sun Odyssey 28.1

Boat
- Displacement: 5,732 lb (2,600 kg)
- Draft: 4.92 ft (1.50 m)

Hull
- Type: monohull
- Construction: fiberglass
- LOA: 27.89 ft (8.50 m)
- LWL: 23.29 ft (7.10 m)
- Beam: 9.84 ft (3.00 m)
- Engine: Yanmar 19 hp (14 kW) diesel engine

Hull appendages
- Keel: fin keel
- Ballast: 1,764 lb (800 kg)
- Rudder: spade-type rudder

Rig
- Rig type: Bermuda rig
- I foretriangle height: 33.15 ft (10.10 m)
- J foretriangle base: 9.45 ft (2.88 m)
- P mainsail luff: 33.63 ft (10.25 m)
- E mainsail foot: 11.48 ft (3.50 m)

Sails
- Sailplan: fractional rigged sloop
- Mainsail area: 193.04 sq ft (17.934 m^{2})
- Jib/genoa area: 156.63 sq ft (14.551 m^{2})
- Total sail area: 349.67 sq ft (32.485 m^{2})

The Sun Odyssey 28.5 is a French sailboat that was designed by Tony Castro as a cruiser and first built in 1994.

The design was originally sold as the Sun Way 29.

== Production ==
The design was built by Jeanneau in France, starting in 1994, but it is now out of production.

== Design ==
The Sun Odyssey 28.1 is a recreational keelboat, built predominantly of fiberglass, with wood trim. It has a fractional sloop rig, a raked stem, a reverse transom with steps, an internally mounted spade-type rudder controlled by a tiller and a fixed fin keel or optional keel and centerboard. It displaces 5,732 lb (2,600 kg) and carries 1,764 lb (800 kg) of ballast.

The boat has a draft of 4.92 ft (1.50 m) with the standard fin keel fitted.

The boat is fitted with a Japanese Yanmar diesel engine of 19 hp (14 kW) for docking and maneuvering. The fuel tank holds 12 U.S. gallons (45 L; 10.0 imp gal) and the fresh water tank has a capacity of 26 U.S. gallons (98 L; 22 imp gal).

The design has sleeping accommodation for four to six people, with a double "V"-berth in the bow cabin, two straight settees in the main cabin and an aft cabin with a double berth on the port side. The galley is located on the port side at the companionway ladder. The galley is L-shaped and is equipped with a two-burner stove, an ice box and a sink. A navigation station is opposite the galley, on the starboard side. The head is located aft, opposite the galley, also on the starboard side.

The design has a hull speed of 6.47 kn (11.98 km/h).

== Operational history ==
In a 1995 Cruising World review, Quentin Warren described the design as, "a high-volume mini-cruiser designed by Tony Castro ... and another in the French mega-builder's line of finely turned out family oriented sailing vessels."

== See also ==
- List of sailing boat types
