= Sun Way 28 =

Sailboat class

Development
- Designer: Tony Castro
- Location: France
- Year: 1987
- Builder: Jeanneau
- Role: Cruiser
- Name: Sun Way 28

Boat
- Displacement: 5,291 lb (2,400 kg)
- Draft: 4.92 ft (1.50 m)

Hull
- Type: monohull
- Construction: fiberglass
- LOA: 28.71 ft (8.75 m)
- LWL: 23.13 ft (7.05 m)
- Beam: 9.81 ft (2.99 m)
- Engine: Volvo 2002 diesel engine

Hull appendages
- Keel: fin keel
- Ballast: 1,764 lb (800 kg)
- Rudder: spade-type rudder

Rig
- Rig type: Bermuda rig
- I foretriangle height: 33.14 ft (10.10 m)
- J foretriangle base: 9.45 ft (2.88 m)
- P mainsail luff: 33.69 ft (10.27 m)
- E mainsail foot: 11.48 ft (3.50 m)

Sails
- Sailplan: masthead sloop
- Mainsail area: 193.38 sq ft (17.966 m^{2})
- Jib/genoa area: 156.59 sq ft (14.548 m^{2})
- Total sail area: 349.97 sq ft (32.513 m^{2})

The Sun Way 28 is a French sailboat that was designed by Tony Castro as an offshore cruiser and first built in 1987.

The Sun Way 28 is a development of the Arcadia 30 and is an updated version of the Sun Dream 28.

== Production ==
The design was built by Jeanneau in France, from 1987 until 1992, but it is now out of production.

== Design ==
The Sun Way 28 is a recreational keelboat, built predominantly of fiberglass, with wood trim. It has a fractional sloop rig, with aluminum spars with stainless steel wire rigging. The hull has a raked stem, a rounded reverse transom, an internally mounted spade-type rudder controlled by a tiller and a fixed fin keel or optional stub keel and centerboard. The fin keel model displaces 5,291 lb (2,400 kg) and carries 1,764 lb (800 kg) of ballast, while the centerboard version displaces 5,732 lb (2,600 kg) and has twin rudders.

The keel-equipped version of the boat has a draft of 4.92 ft (1.50 m), while the centerboard-equipped version has a draft of 5.08 ft (1.55 m) with the centerboard extended and 2.13 ft (0.65 m) with it retracted, allowing operation in shallow water.

The boat is fitted with a Swedish Volvo 2002 diesel engine for docking and maneuvering. The fuel tank holds 7 U.S. gallons (26 L; 5.8 imp gal) and the fresh water tank has a capacity of 26 U.S. gallons (98 L; 22 imp gal).

The design has sleeping accommodation for four people, with a double "V"-berth in the bow cabin, a U-shaped settee around a drop-leaf table in the main cabin and an aft cabin with a double berth on the port side. The galley is located on the port side just forward of the companionway ladder. The galley is L-shaped and is equipped with a two-burner stove, an ice box and a sink. A navigation station is opposite the galley, on the starboard side. The head is located opposite the galley on the starboard side and includes a hanging locker.

The design has a hull speed of 6.44 kn (11.93 km/h).

== See also ==
- List of sailing boat types
