= CS Yachts =

Canadian sailboat builder

- Company type: Privately held company
- Industry: Boat building
- Founded: 1963
- Founder: Paul Tennyson
- Defunct: 1992
- Fate: Business wound up
- Headquarters: Canada
- Area served: Canada
- Key people: Paul Tennyson
- Products: Sailboats

CS Yachts was a Canadian boat manufacturer founded in 1963 by Paul Tennyson, under the name Canadian Sailcraft. The company specialized in the design and manufacture of fibreglass sailboats. The location of the firm was in Brampton, Ontario, near the Great Lakes yachting epicentre of the day, Toronto.

The company business was wound up in 1992.

== History ==
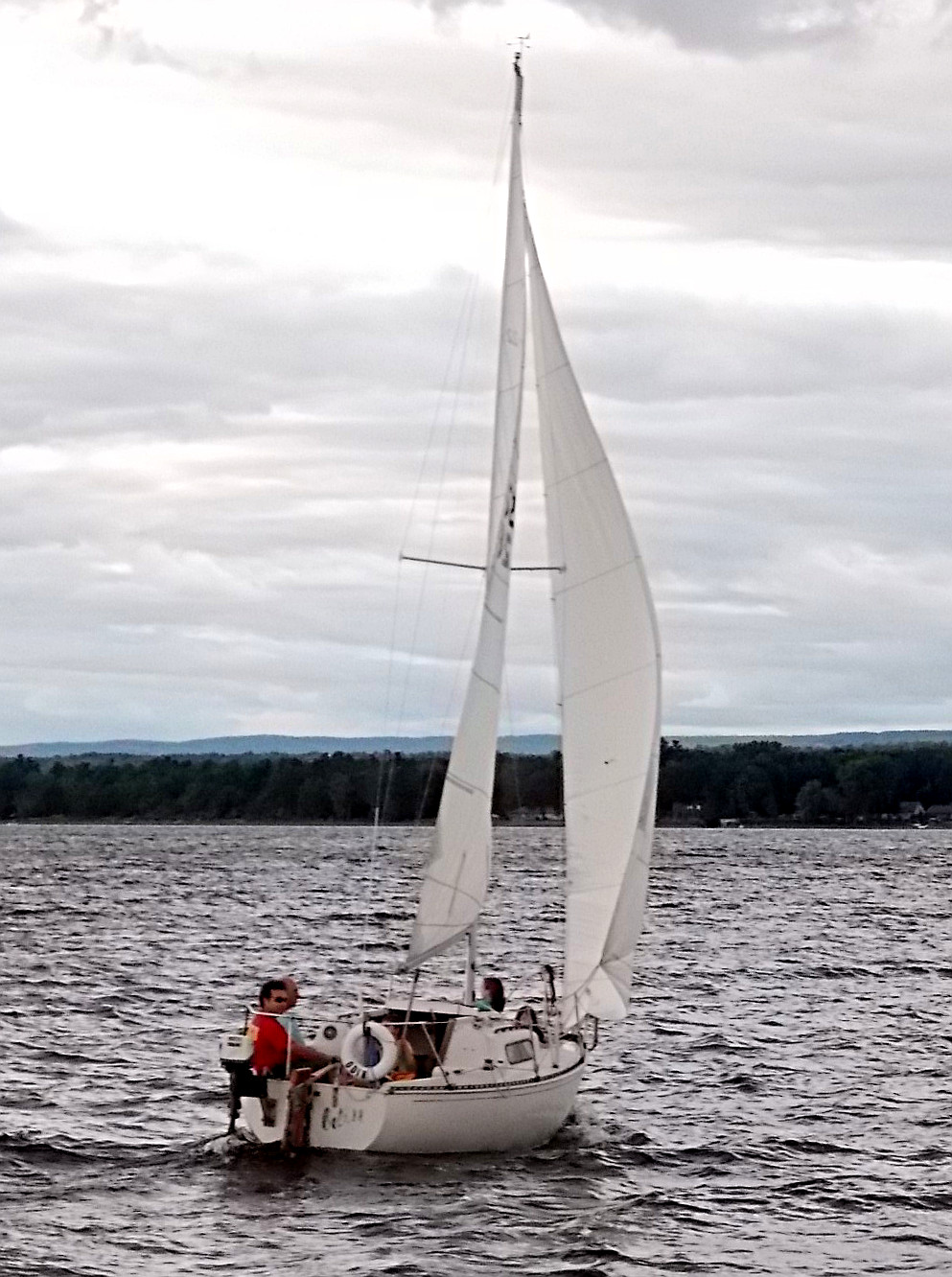
CS 22

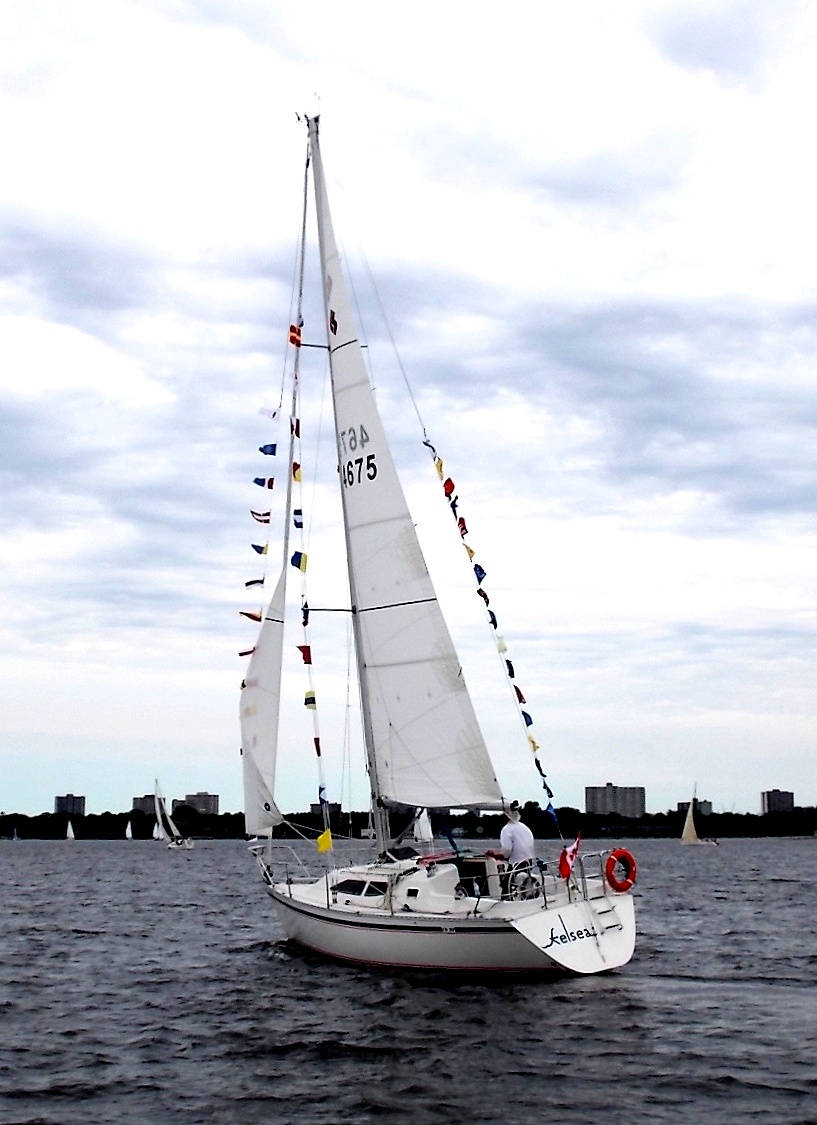
CS 33

Tennyson owned a reinforced plastics business and decided to produce the Cornice dinghy as a sideline in 1963 under the name Canadian Sailcraft. The Caprice 15 followed in 1968. In 1970 the company ceased dinghy production to concentrate on keelboats instead, changing its name to CS Yachts.

The initial designer was John Butler, who designed the CS 22. Raymond Wall, formerly the chief designer for Camper and Nicholsons was head designer at CS from 1977 to 1983, when he designed the CS 27, CS 36 and the CS 33. In 1983 Tony Castro became head designer and produced the CS 36 Merlin, the CS 30, CS 44, CS 40 and the CS 34. The 1979 CS 395 and 1987 CS 50 were designed by Germán Frers. Other designs were produced at C&C Yachts.

Production peaked in 1986, with 175 boats completed. In 1987 the company relocated to a 100,000 sq ft (9,300 m^{2}) production facility, but by 1990 the demand for new sailboats had decreased and the company business was wound up, ceasing operations in 1992.

== Sailboats ==
Summary of boats built by Canadian Sailcraft and CS Yachts:

- Cornice dinghy - 1963
- Caprice 15 - 1968
- CS 22 - 1971
- CS 27 - 1975
- CS 36 - 1978
- CS 33 - 1979
- CS 395 - 1979
- CS 30 - 1984
- CS 44 - 1985
- CS 36 Merlin - 1986
- CS 40 - 1987
- CS 50 - 1987
- CS 34 - 1989
