= CS 40 =

Sailboat class

Development
- Designer: Tony Castro
- Location: Canada
- Year: 1987
- Builder: CS Yachts
- Name: CS 40

Boat
- Displacement: 17,000 lb (7,711 kg)
- Draft: 6.58 ft (2.01 m)

Hull
- Type: Monohull
- Construction: Fibreglass
- LOA: 39.25 ft (11.96 m)
- LWL: 32.67 ft (9.96 m)
- Beam: 12.67 ft (3.86 m)
- Engine: Volvo Penta 43 hp (32 kW) diesel engine

Hull appendages
- Keel: fin keel
- Ballast: 7,500 lb (3,402 kg)
- Rudder: internally-mounted spade-type rudder

Rig
- General: Masthead sloop
- I foretriangle height: 51.00 ft (15.54 m)
- J foretriangle base: 14.50 ft (4.42 m)
- P mainsail luff: 45.00 ft (13.72 m)
- E mainsail foot: 16.50 ft (5.03 m)

Sails
- Mainsail area: 371.25 sq ft (34.490 m^{2})
- Jib/genoa area: 395.25 sq ft (36.720 m^{2})
- Total sail area: 766.50 sq ft (71.210 m^{2})

Racing
- PHRF: 108 (average)

The CS 40 is a Canadian sailboat, that was designed by Tony Castro and first built in 1987.

== Production ==
The boat was built by CS Yachts in Canada, starting in 1987, but it is now out of production.

== Design ==
The CS 40 is a recreational keelboat, built predominantly of fibreglass. It has a masthead sloop rig, an internally-mounted spade-type rudder, a fixed fin keel and displaces 17,000 lb (7,711 kg).

The boat is fitted with a Volvo Penta diesel engine of 43 hp (32 kW). The fuel tank holds 50 U.S. gallons (190 L; 42 imp gal) and the fresh water tank has a capacity of 100 U.S. gallons (380 L; 83 imp gal).

The boat has a hull speed of 7.66 kn (14.19 km/h).

== Variants ==
CS 40
This model carries 7,500 lb (3,402 kg) of ballast. The boat has a draft of 6.58 ft (2.01 m) with the standard keel. The boat has a PHRF racing average handicap of 108 with a high of 108 and low of 108.
CS 40 TM
This tall mast model carries 7,200 lb (3,266 kg) of ballast, has a mast approximately 2.0 ft (0.6 m) taller and carries 800.15 sq ft (74.336 m^{2}) of sail. The boat has a draft of 6.58 ft (2.01 m) with the standard keel. The boat has a PHRF racing average handicap of 93 with a high of 96 and low of 87.
CS 40 TM DK
This tall mast and deep keel model and carries 7,700 lb (3,493 kg) of ballast, has a mast approximately 2.0 ft (0.6 m) taller and carries 800.15 sq ft (74.336 m^{2}) of sail. The boat has a draft of 6.83 ft (2.08 m) with the deep keel. The boat has a PHRF racing average handicap of 93 with a high of 93 and low of 93.
CS 40 WK
This wing keel model carries 7,500 lb (3,402 kg) of ballast. The boat has a draft of 5.00 ft (1.52 m) with the wing keel. The boat has a PHRF racing average handicap of 102 with a high of 99 and low of 102.

== See also ==
- List of sailing boat types

Similar sailboats

- C&C 39
- C&C 40
- Columbia 40
- Hunter 40
- Hunter 40.5
- Hunter 41
- Marlow-Hunter 40
