= Sun Shine 38 =

Sailboat class

Development
- Designer: Tony Castro
- Location: France
- Year: 1987
- Builder: Jeanneau
- Role: Cruiser-Racer
- Name: Sun Shine 38

Boat
- Displacement: 12,677 lb (5,750 kg)
- Draft: 6.23 ft (1.90 m)

Hull
- Type: monohull
- Construction: fiberglass
- LOA: 38.25 ft (11.66 m)
- LWL: 32.50 ft (9.91 m)
- Beam: 12.63 ft (3.85 m)
- Engine: Yanmar 3GM30 30 hp (22 kW) diesel engine

Hull appendages
- Keel: fin keel
- Ballast: 4,850 lb (2,200 kg)
- Rudder: spade-type rudder

Rig
- Rig type: Bermuda rig
- I foretriangle height: 46.30 ft (14.11 m)
- J foretriangle base: 14.70 ft (4.48 m)
- P mainsail luff: 40.00 ft (12.19 m)
- E mainsail foot: 13.50 ft (4.11 m)

Sails
- Sailplan: masthead sloop
- Mainsail area: 270.00 sq ft (25.084 m^{2})
- Jib/genoa area: 340.31 sq ft (31.616 m^{2})
- Total sail area: 610.31 sq ft (56.700 m^{2})

The Sun Shine 38 is a French sailboat that was designed by Tony Castro as a cruiser-racer and first built in 1987.

The design is a development of the Sun Shine 36 with a longer and sharper transom, giving it a longer waterline length and thus higher hull speed.

== Production ==
The design was built by Jeanneau in France, from 1987 to 1989, in both "team" and "owners" versions, but it is now out of production.

== Design ==
The Sun Shine 38 is a recreational keelboat, built predominantly of fiberglass using Aramat K, which is a stratified glass/Kevlar composite material. It has a masthead sloop rig. The hull has a raked stem, a sharply reverse transom, an internally mounted spade-type rudder controlled by a wheel and a fixed fin keel or optional stub keel and retractable centerboard. The fin keel version displaces 12,677 lb (5,750 kg) and carries 4,850 lb (2,200 kg) of ballast, while the centerboard-equipped version displaces 12,677 lb (5,750 kg) and carries 5,776 lb (2,620 kg) of ballast.

The keel-equipped version of the boat has a draft of 6.23 ft (1.90 m), while the centerboard-equipped version has a draft of 6.89 ft (2.10 m) with the centerboard extended and 4.08 ft (1.24 m) with it retracted, allowing operation in shallow water.

The boat is fitted with a Japanese Yanmar 3GM30 diesel engine of 30 hp (22 kW) for docking and maneuvering. The fuel tank holds 22 U.S. gallons (83 L; 18 imp gal) and the fresh water tank has a capacity of 53 U.S. gallons (200 L; 44 imp gal).

The design has sleeping accommodation for six people, with a double "V"-berth in the bow cabin, an L-shaped settee and a straight settee in the main cabin and an aft cabin with a double berth on the port side. The galley is located on the port side just forward of the companionway ladder. The galley is U-shaped and is equipped with a two-burner stove, ice box and a double sink. A navigation station is opposite the galley, on the starboard side. The head is located just aft of the companionway on the starboard side. There is also a single sink located just aft of the bow cabin on the port side and inside the aft cabin.

For sailing downwind the design may be equipped with a symmetrical spinnaker.

The design has a hull speed of 7.63 kn (14.13 km/h).

== Operational history ==
In a 2014 used boat review David Liscio wrote, "with a fast hull and strong rig, the lightweight Sunshine 38 is capable of efficiently capturing a gentle breeze or taking on a gusty blow. Just as Castro planned, it's the perfect combination of speed and comfort."

== See also ==
- List of sailing boat types
