= Endeavour 40 =

Sailboat class

Development
- Designer: Robert K. Johnson
- Location: United States
- Year: 1981
- No. built: circa 185
- Builder: Endeavour Yacht Corporation
- Role: Cruiser
- Name: Endeavour 40

Boat
- Displacement: 25,000 lb (11,340 kg)
- Draft: 5.00 ft (1.52 m)

Hull
- Type: Monohull
- Construction: Fiberglass
- LOA: 40.00 ft (12.19 m)
- LWL: 32.00 ft (9.75 m)
- Beam: 13.00 ft (3.96 m)
- Engine: Perkins Engines 4-108 50 hp (37 kW) diesel engine

Hull appendages
- Keel: fin keel
- Ballast: 9,000 lb (4,082 kg)
- Rudder: skeg-mounted rudder

Rig
- Rig type: Bermuda rig
- I foretriangle height: 50.77 ft (15.47 m)
- J foretriangle base: 15.85 ft (4.83 m)
- P mainsail luff: 49.00 ft (14.94 m)
- E mainsail foot: 15.75 ft (4.80 m)

Sails
- Sailplan: Masthead sloop
- Mainsail area: 385.88 sq ft (35.849 m^{2})
- Jib/genoa area: 402.35 sq ft (37.380 m^{2})
- Total sail area: 788.23 sq ft (73.229 m^{2})

Racing
- PHRF: 126

The Endeavour 40 is an American sailboat that was designed by Robert K. Johnson as a cruiser and first built in 1981.

== Production ==
The design was built by the Endeavour Yacht Corporation in the United States. The company built about 185 examples between 1981 and 1985, but it is now out of production.

== Design ==
The Endeavour 40 was intended for both the private owner's market and yacht charter operators and was intended to compete directly with boats built by Gulfstar Yachts, as both company principals, John Books and Rob Valdes has previously worked for Gulfstar.

The Endeavour 40 is a recreational keelboat, built predominantly of polyester resin and fiberglass woven roving and multi-directional chopped strand fiber, with teak wood trim. It has a center cockpit, masthead sloop rig or optional ketch rig, with aluminum spars, a raked stem, a reverse transom, a skeg-mounted rudder controlled by a wheel and a fixed fin keel. It displaces 25,000 lb (11,340 kg) and carries 9,000 lb (4,082 kg) of structural lead ballast.

The boat has a draft of 5.00 ft (1.52 m) with the standard keel fitted.

The boat is fitted with a British Perkins Engines 4-108 diesel engine of 50 hp (37 kW) for docking and maneuvering. The fuel tank holds 75 U.S. gallons (280 L; 62 imp gal) and the fresh water tank has a capacity of 170 U.S. gallons (640 L; 140 imp gal).

The design has sleeping accommodation for six people, with a double "V"-berth in the bow cabin, two straight settees in the main cabin and an aft cabin with a double berth. The main cabin features a folding dining table with two drop-leaves. The galley is located on the port side just aft of the companionway ladder. The galley is L-shaped and is equipped with a three-burner alcohol-fired stove and a double sink with hot and cold pressurized water and a fresh water pump, plus a refrigerator. A navigation station is opposite the galley, on the starboard side. There are two heads, one just aft of the bow cabin on the starboard side that includes a shower and one on the port side in the aft cabin. The engine room is located centrally, under the companionway ladder. The cabin is trimmed in teak.

Ventilation is provided by 16 ports that open and four hatches.

For sailing the mainsail has a mainsheet traveler at the aft of the center cockpit, two winches for the genoa sheets and one for the mainsheet, plus two winches for the main and genoa halyards. The boat is equipped with a topping lift and slab reefing.

The design has a PHRF racing average handicap of 126.

== Operational history ==
In a 1994 review Richard Sherwood wrote that the Endeavour 40 "is a big, comfortable cruiser intended for extended trips. Note that both fuel and water capacity are high. Ballast/displacement ratio is 36 percent. The cockpit, like most center cockpits, is high and therefore dry."

Steve Knauth wrote a review for Soundings Magazine in 2008 and stated, "the 1980s hull design features a modified fin keel with a skeg-protected rudder. The forefoot is slightly flatter than a traditional wineglass hull, and the 13-foot beam is carried well aft for form stability and interior volume. Sail area is 743 square feet, with a 338-square-foot main and 405-square-foot foretriangle. The center cockpit is farther aft than some designs, and it’s high and dry."

== See also ==
- List of sailing boat types

Similar sailboats

- Baltic 40
- Bayfield 40
- Bermuda 40
- Bristol 39
- Bristol 40
- Caliber 40
- Dickerson 41
- Islander 40
- Lord Nelson 41
- Nordic 40
