= Bermuda 40 =

Sailboat class

Development
- Designer: William Tripp, Jr.
- Location: United States
- Year: 1959
- No. built: 203
- Builder: Hinckley Yachts
- Role: Racer-Cruiser
- Name: Bermuda 40

Boat
- Displacement: 19,000 lb (8,618 kg)
- Draft: 8.60 ft (2.62 m), centerboard down

Hull
- Type: Monohull
- Construction: Fiberglass
- LOA: 40.75 ft (12.42 m)
- LWL: 27.83 ft (8.48 m)
- Beam: 11.75 ft (3.58 m)
- Engine: Westerbeke 4-107 40 hp (30 kW) diesel engine

Hull appendages
- Keel: long keel with centerboard
- Ballast: 6,500 lb (2,948 kg)
- Rudder: keel-mounted rudder

Rig
- Rig type: Yawl rig
- I foretriangle height: 42.50 ft (12.95 m)
- J foretriangle base: 15.70 ft (4.79 m)
- P mainsail luff: 36.60 ft (11.16 m)
- E mainsail foot: 17.20 ft (5.24 m)

Sails
- Sailplan: Masthead yawl
- Mainsail area: 314.76 sq ft (29.242 m^{2})
- Jib/genoa area: 333.63 sq ft (30.995 m^{2})
- Total sail area: 648.39 sq ft (60.237 m^{2})

Racing
- PHRF: 163

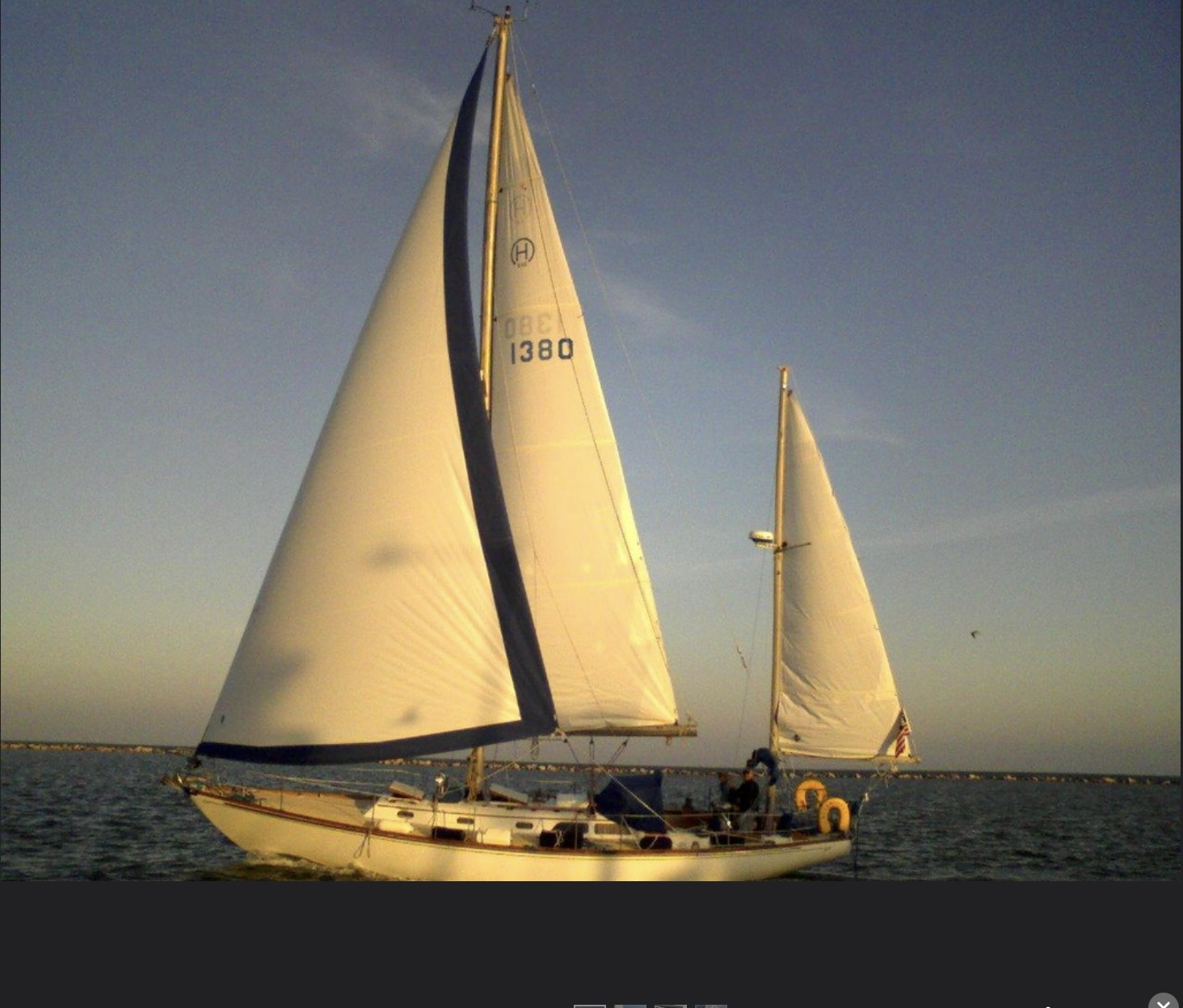
Bermuda 40 yawl underway with full sail

The Bermuda 40 is an American sailboat that was designed by William Tripp, Jr. in 1958 as a racer-cruiser and first built in 1960.

The Bermuda 40 is a development of the Tripp-designed Block Island 40.

The manufacturer considers the current production Bermuda 50 "the modern day evolution of the Bermuda 40".

== Production ==
Henry Hinckley had originally planned to build his first fiberglass sailboat based on a 38 foot boat which was intended to serve as the plug from which molds would be built. However, a group, (the "Cigal Group”) of six prospective buyers from the Knickerbocker Yacht Club approached him during the 1959 New York Boat Show about building boats based on William H. Tripp Jr's Block Island 40. Two additional buyers then also committed to the new design and the prospect of ten guaranteed sales was attractive, reducing the market risk of the new design. Construction began in the fall of 1959. Hull #1, Huntress, was launched in time for the 1960 Bermuda Race and the remaining first group of boats was completed that year.

The design was built by Hinckley Yachts in the United States, with 203 examples of the design completed in all versions between 1959 and 1991. The Bermuda 40 was Hinckley's first fiberglass sailboat, although the builder had experimented with small club fiberglass committee-type boats in the 1950s.

== Design ==
The Bermuda 40 is a recreational keelboat, built predominantly of fiberglass, with teak wood trim, including the cockpit coaming. It has a masthead sloop rig or optional yawl rig, with coated aluminum spars. It features a spooned raked stem, a raised counter transom, a keel-mounted rudder controlled by a wheel and a fixed long keel with a bronze centreboard, operated via a worm gear.

The boat is fitted with a Westerbeke 4-107 diesel engine of 40 hp (30 kW) for docking and maneuvering. The fuel tank holds 48 U.S. gallons (180 L; 40 imp gal) and the fresh water tank has a capacity of 110 U.S. gallons (420 L; 92 imp gal). Later models were offered with Yanmar 4JH2 engines.

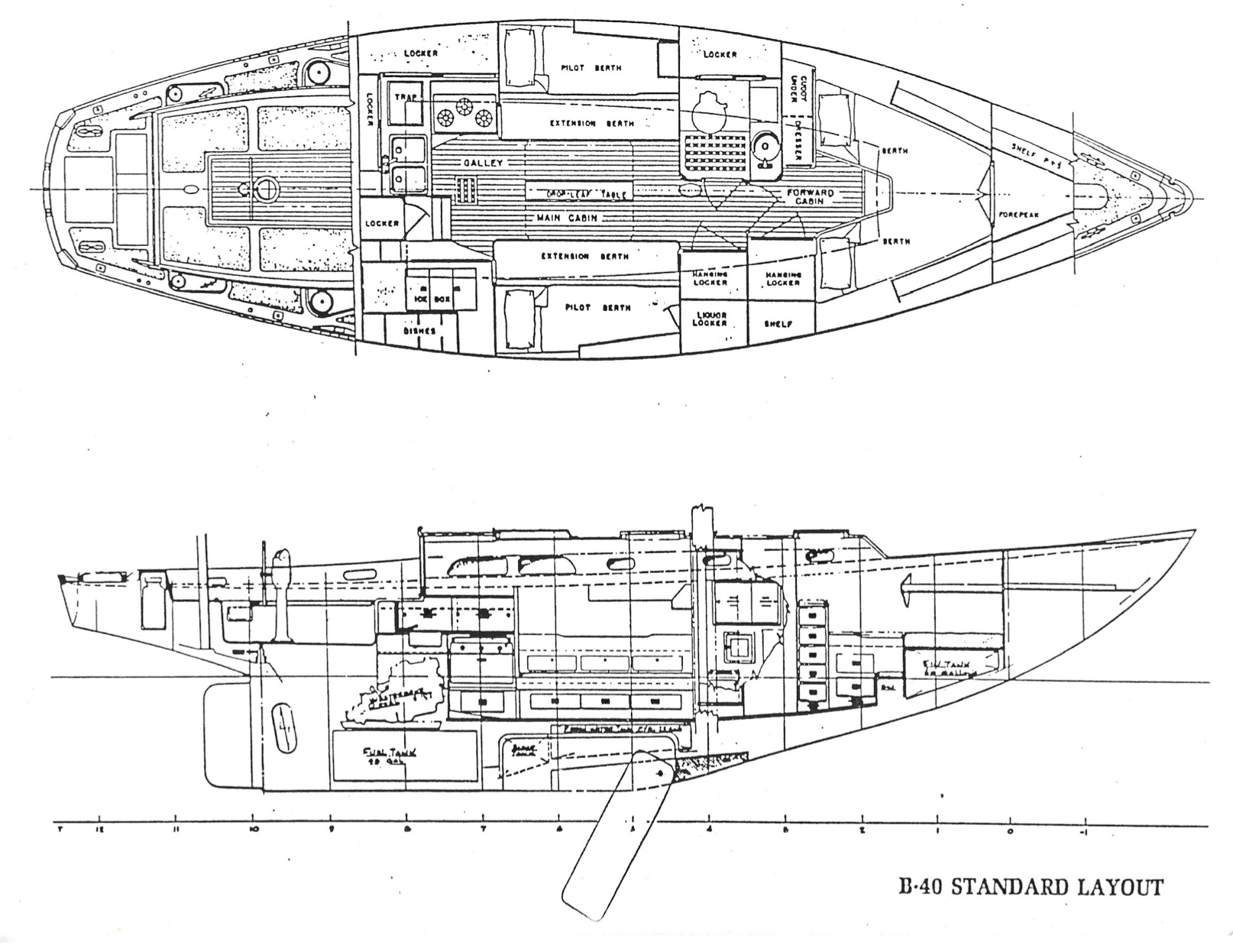
Bermuda 40 standard layout with cutaway profile view

The interior Standard Layout design has sleeping accommodation for six people, with a double "V"-berth in the bow cabin, two straight settee berths in the main cabin around the drop-leaf dinette table, each settee with a pilot berth above. The galley is located on the port side at the foot of the companionway ladder. The galley is L-shaped and is equipped with a three-burner propane-fired stove and a sink. A navigation station is opposite the galley, on the starboard side and employs the icebox top as a chart table. A refrigerator was optional. The head is located just aft of the bow cabin on the port side and includes a shower. Stowage includes built-in bookcases, as well as wet lockers. The factory optional Layout "A" substitutes a dinette table for the port settee.

For sailing there are two primary and two secondary cockpit winches as well as winches for the mainsail and jib halyards, the mainsheet, the mizzen mast halyard and the sheet. Jiffy reefing is provided, with two reefing points.

The design has a PHRF racing average handicap of 163.

== Variants ==
Bermuda 40-1
This model was introduced in 1959. It has a length overall of 40.75 ft (12.4 m), a waterline length of 27.83 ft (8.5 m), displaces 19,000 lb (8,618 kg) and carries 6,500 lb (2,948 kg) of lead ballast. The boat has a draft of 8.60 ft (2.62 m) with the centreboard extended and 4.30 ft (1.31 m) with it retracted.
Bermuda 40-2
This model was introduced in 1968 and incorporates increased sail area, bringing it to 657.03 sq ft (61.040 m^{2}), plus more ballast. It has a length overall of 40.75 ft (12.4 m), a waterline length of 28.83 ft (8.8 m), displaces 20,000 lb (9,072 kg) and carries 7,000 lb (3,175 kg) of lead ballast, 500 lb (227 kg) more than the 40-1. The boat has a draft of 8.75 ft (2.67 m) with the centreboard extended and 4.50 ft (1.37 m) with it retracted.
Bermuda 40-3
This model was introduced in 1971 and introduced hull and keel changes and a heavier centerboard. The main mast was moved aft, the boom shortened, producing a higher-aspect ratio mainsail and larger genoa. It has a length overall of 40.75 ft (12.4 m), a waterline length of 28.83 ft (8.8 m), displaces 20,000 lb (9,072 kg) and carries 6,500 lb (2,948 kg) of lead ballast. The boat has a draft of 8.60 ft (2.62 m) with the centreboard extended and 4.30 ft (1.31 m) with it retracted.

== Operational history ==
A review in 2010 by Charles Doane indicated, "with its classic long overhangs, perfectly pitched sheer line, wide side-decks, graceful cabin profile, and distinctive near-vertical transom, the Bermuda 40 has inspired severe lust in the heart of many a cruising sailor. Designed by Bill Tripp, Jr., it is without doubt one of the most attractive production sailboats ever conceived."

In May 1998 Jack Horner of spinsheet.com wrote “the B-40 was to become the bellwether for future production and established Hinckley as the premier North American Yacht builder of exceptional quality sailing yachts”.

In a 2017 used boat review, some 59 years after it was designed, a The Spin Sheet reviewer stated, "I don’t recall a time when my sense of style, balance and proper proportion of sailing yachts has not been influenced by the design work of the late Bill Tripp. The Bermuda 40 is a quintessential example of Tripp’s art and masterful eye for near-perfect balance. I think it can be safely said that this boat has stood the test of time, and, although the design is now 40 years old, many people, myself among them, still consider the Bermuda 40 one of the most beautiful yachts afloat."

== See also ==
- List of sailing boat types

Similar sailboats

- Baltic 40
- Bayfield 40
- Bristol 40
- Caliber 40
- Dickerson 41
- Endeavour 40
- Islander 40
- Lord Nelson 41
- Nordic 40
