= Cal 39 Mark II =

Sailboat class

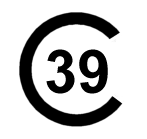
- Class symbol

Development
- Designer: C. William Lapworth
- Location: United States
- Year: 1978
- No. built: about 150
- Builder: Jensen Marine/Cal Yachts
- Role: Racer-Cruiser
- Name: Cal 39 Mark II

Boat
- Displacement: 17,000 lb (7,711 kg)
- Draft: 6.67 ft (2.03 m)

Hull
- Type: Monohull
- Construction: Fiberglass
- LOA: 39.00 ft (11.89 m)
- LWL: 32.08 ft (9.78 m)
- Beam: 12.00 ft (3.66 m)
- Engine: Perkins Engines 4108 50 hp (37 kW) diesel engine

Hull appendages
- Keel: fin keel
- Ballast: 7,000 lb (3,175 kg)
- Rudder: spade-type rudder

Rig
- Rig type: Bermuda rig
- I foretriangle height: 50.00 ft (15.24 m)
- J foretriangle base: 16.67 ft (5.08 m)
- P mainsail luff: 44.00 ft (13.41 m)
- E mainsail foot: 13.75 ft (4.19 m)

Sails
- Sailplan: Cutter rigged sloop
- Mainsail area: 302.50 sq ft (28.103 m^{2})
- Jib/genoa area: 416.75 sq ft (38.717 m^{2})
- Total sail area: 719.25 sq ft (66.821 m^{2})

Racing
- D-PN: 75.4
- PHRF: 114

The Cal 39 Mark II and Cal 39 Mark III are a series of American sailboats that were designed by C. William Lapworth as racer-cruisers to fit the International Offshore Rule and first built in 1978.

The Cal 39 Mark II replaced the Cal 39 in the company product line and was in turn replaced by the derivative variant Cal 39 Mark III in 1983. The Mark III design was than replaced by the clean sheet Cal 39 (Hunt/O'Day) design in 1988.

== Production ==
The designs were built by Jensen Marine/Cal Yachts in the United States, which was owned by Bangor Punta at that time. About 150 were completed between 1978 and 1986, but the boat is now out of production.

== Design ==
The factory brochure for the boat describes the Mark II design goals as, "A Cruiser Built For Speed, Not Rating Points".

The Cal 39 Mark II and Mark III are recreational keelboats, built predominantly of fiberglass, with balsa-cored decks and wooden trim. They both have raked stems, slightly raised counter reverse transoms, spade-type rudders, controlled by a wheels and fixed fin keels. The spars are of painted aluminum.

The design has sleeping accommodation for six people. There is a bow cabin with a double "V"-berth, an aft double cabin on the port side and two settee berths in the main cabin. The galley is located to the starboard side, at the foot of the companionway steps and includes a three-burner, alcohol-fired stove and an oven, as well as an 8 cu ft (0.23 m^{3}) icebox. The main cabin has a folding dining table. There is a head on the port side, aft of the bow cabin and a second one was factory option, in place of the navigation table, aft on the port side. Pressurized hot and cold water is provided.

Ventilation and light includes eight opening ports along with the four fixed ones, deadlights over the head and passageway and a dorade vent over the galley, plus two translucent hatches, over the bow cabin and the main cabin.

The T-shaped cockpit has a winch for the mainsheet, two winches for the halyards and two genoa winches. The halyards and outhaul are mounted internally. The mainsheet traveler has a 5:1 mechanical advantage. There are also jib tracks and an anchor locker in the bow.

== Variants ==
Mark II
This model was introduced in 1978 and produced until 1982. It has a cutter rig, a length overall of 39.00 ft (11.9 m), a waterline length of 32.08 ft (9.8 m), a beam of 12.00 ft (3.7 m), displaces 17,000 lb (7,711 kg) and carries 7,000 lb (3,175 kg) of lead ballast. The boat has a draft of 6.67 ft (2.03 m) with the standard keel and 5.50 ft (1.68 m) with the optional shoal draft keel. A tall rig was also available. The boat is fitted with a British Perkins Engines 4108 diesel engine of 50 hp (37 kW) or a Volkswagen Pathfinder diesel, for docking and maneuvering. The fuel tank holds 50 U.S. gallons (190 L; 42 imp gal) and the fresh water tank has a capacity of 90 U.S. gallons (340 L; 75 imp gal). The boat has a PHRF racing average handicap of 114 with the standard rig, or 106 with the tall rig. The Portsmouth Yardstick racing average is 75.4 with the standard rig.
Mark III
This improved model was introduced in 1983 and produced until 1986. It has a masthead sloop rig, a length overall of 39.00 ft (11.9 m), a waterline length of 32.08 ft (9.8 m), a beam of 12.00 ft (3.7 m), displaces 19,000 lb (8,618 kg) and carries 7,000 lb (3,175 kg) of lead ballast. The boat has a draft of 6.75 ft (2.06 m) with the standard keel and 5.50 ft (1.68 m) with the optional shoal draft keel. A tall rig was also available. The boat is fitted with a Universal or Pathfinder diesel engine of 44 hp (33 kW). The fuel tank holds 43 U.S. gallons (160 L; 36 imp gal) and the fresh water tank has a capacity of 125 U.S. gallons (470 L; 104 imp gal).

== Operational history ==
In a 1994 review of the Mark II, Richard Sherwood wrote, "a Lapworth design, this Cal has a long water line, aft-extending rudder, and a substantial sailplan. In addition to the two rigs offered, a shoal-draft keel is available. The fastest boat incorporates the tall rig and the deep keel, with a PHRF of about 106."

A report in Boats.com from 2003 stated, "both the Cal 39, built by Jensen Marine of Costa Mesa, California, and the Cal 39 MK III, built by Bangor Punta in Fall River, Massachusetts, are jewels in the tradition of most Bill Lapworth designs. Built between 1978 and 1986, they are true racer/cruisers sailors' boats with high performance on all points of sail, but with cruising accommodations that make them ideal boats to retrofit for offshore passagemaking."

A 2008 review by John Kretschmer in Sailing Magazine described the Mark II as, "an ideal boat to consider for long-range cruising". He wrote, "launched in 1978, the Cal 39 was built during the hectic period when Cal's manufacturing shifted to Tampa, Florida, and then up to Fall River, Massachusetts, as the company struggled to re-establish its identity. Still, when all the glass cures, it is really the design that carries the day, and in typical fashion Lapworth was ahead of the curve with the 39. It was a genuine performance cruiser before there really was such an animal, and as such, the design not only seems less dated than others from this period, it is still highly desirable as a capable and affordable cruiser."

== See also ==
- List of sailing boat types

Similar sailboats

- Baltic 40
- Cal 39
- Corbin 39
- Freedom 39
- Freedom 39 PH
- Islander 40
- Nautical 39
- Nordic 40
