= Baltic 40 =

Sailboat class

Development
- Designer: Judel/Vrolijk & Co.
- Location: Finland
- Year: 1988
- No. built: 21
- Builder: Baltic Yachts
- Role: Racer-Cruiser
- Name: Baltic 40

Boat
- Displacement: 14,992 lb (6,800 kg)
- Draft: 7.17 ft (2.19 m)

Hull
- Type: Monohull
- Construction: Fiberglass
- LOA: 39.33 ft (11.99 m)
- LWL: 32.75 ft (9.98 m)
- Beam: 12.75 ft (3.89 m)
- Engine: Yanmar 34 hp (25 kW) diesel engine

Hull appendages
- Keel: fin keel
- Ballast: 6,173 lb (2,800 kg)
- Rudder: spade-type rudder

Rig
- Rig type: Bermuda rig
- I foretriangle height: 55.28 ft (16.85 m)
- J foretriangle base: 15.10 ft (4.60 m)
- P mainsail luff: 49.38 ft (15.05 m)
- E mainsail foot: 15.63 ft (4.76 m)

Sails
- Sailplan: Masthead sloop
- Mainsail area: 385.90 sq ft (35.851 m^{2})
- Jib/genoa area: 417.36 sq ft (38.774 m^{2})
- Total sail area: 803.27 sq ft (74.626 m^{2})

Racing
- Rating: IOR 25.7

The Baltic 40 is a Finnish sailboat that was designed by Judel/Vrolijk & Co. as an International Offshore Rule racer-cruiser and first built in 1988.

== Production ==
The design was built by Baltic Yachts in Finland from 1988 to 1999. The company completed 21 examples, but it is now out of production.

== Design ==
The Baltic 40 is a recreational keelboat, built predominantly of fiberglass with a balsa core, with wooden trim, including a teak deck. It has a masthead sloop rig with anodized aluminum spars and steel rod standing rigging for the three spreader mast. The design has a raked stem, a reverse transom, a spade-type rudder controlled by a wheel and a fixed fin keel. It displaces 14,992 lb (6,800 kg) and carries 6,173 lb (2,800 kg) of lead ballast.

The boat has a draft of 7.17 ft (2.19 m) with the standard keel fitted.

The boat is fitted with a Japanese Yanmar diesel engine of 34 hp (25 kW) for docking and maneuvering. The fuel tank holds 33 U.S. gallons (120 L; 27 imp gal) and the fresh water tank has a capacity of 50 U.S. gallons (190 L; 42 imp gal).

The cruising interior configuration provides sleeping accommodation for four people. There is an aft cabin under the cockpit with a king-sized berth and a bow cabin, with a "V"-berth. The galley is located on the starboard side at the foot of the companionway steps. It features a gimballed propane-fired stove and a stainless steel icebox and sink, with foot-pumped fresh water and sea water. The head is located amidships, opposite the galley, on the port side and includes a shower. It is accessible from the aft cabin and the saloon. A second head forward was a factory option. The saloon has two curved settees and a table with the keel-stepped mast passing through it. A navigation station is on the port side forward of the head.

For sailing there are winches for the mainsail, genoa and spinnaker internally-mounted halyards, as well as for the mainsheet. There are sheeting winches for the genoa and spinnaker on each side of the cockpit, plus additional winches for the Cunningham and for the slab reefing.

The design has an IOR racing handicap of 25.7.

== Operational history ==
In a 1994 review Richard Sherwood wrote, "Baltic is a Finnish builder, and the 40, with its winged keel, is designed for both racing and cruising. The boat looks fast, and is, but notice that sleeping space is limited in the cruising version ... A second layout is available for a crew of nine. The racing intent shows in the narrow water line, with a light, shallow hull, but with a significant amount of ballast making the boat relatively stiff, and allowing for a masthead rig."

In 2003 yacht designer Robert Perry reviewed the design for Sailing Magazine, writing, "once again Tor Hinders, the chief designer at Baltic, has teamed up with a good design team for the hull lines and rig and produced a benchmark yacht. Baltic's quality is right around the top in this industry" and also noting, "we will never see an ugly boat come out of Baltic."

== See also ==
- List of sailing boat types

Similar sailboats

- Bayfield 40
- Bermuda 40
- Bristol 39
- Bristol 40
- Cal 39
- Cal 39 Mark II
- Cal 39 (Hunt/O'Day)
- Caliber 40
- Corbin 39
- Dickerson 41
- Endeavour 40
- Freedom 39
- Freedom 39 PH
- Islander 40
- Lord Nelson 41
- Nautical 39
- Nordic 40
