= Nordic 40 =

Sailboat class

Development
- Designer: Robert Perry
- Location: United States
- Year: 1978
- No. built: 32
- Builders: Nordic Yachts; Norstar Yachts
- Role: Racer-Cruiser
- Name: Nordic 40

Boat
- Displacement: 18,000 lb (8,165 kg)
- Draft: 6.50 ft (1.98 m)

Hull
- Type: Monohull
- Construction: Fiberglass single laminate, with balsa-cored deck
- LOA: 39.70 ft (12.10 m)
- LWL: 32.50 ft (9.91 m)
- Beam: 12.43 ft (3.79 m)
- Engine: Universal 44 hp (33 kW) diesel engine

Hull appendages
- Keel: fin keel
- Ballast: 7,091 lb (3,216 kg)
- Rudder: skeg-mounted rudder

Rig
- Rig type: Bermuda rig
- I foretriangle height: 52.50 ft (16.00 m)
- J foretriangle base: 16.00 ft (4.88 m)
- P mainsail luff: 48.00 ft (14.63 m)
- E mainsail foot: 14.00 ft (4.27 m)

Sails
- Sailplan: Masthead sloop
- Mainsail area: 336.00 sq ft (31.215 m^{2})
- Jib/genoa area: 420.00 sq ft (39.019 m^{2})
- Total sail area: 756.00 sq ft (70.235 m^{2})

Racing
- PHRF: 105

The Nordic 40 is an American sailboat that was designed by Robert Perry as a racer-cruiser and first built in 1978.

== Production ==
The design was built by Nordic Yachts in Bellingham, Washington, United States between 1978 and 1991, with 32 examples built. A luxury tax imposed in the US in 1991 caused the end of production and the shut-down of the company.

Gary Nordvedt, the founder of Nordic Yachts established Norstar Yachts with his brother Steve, in Bellingham as a powerboat builder in 1994. He bought the old molds back and returned the Nordic 40 to production in 2009, although the company went out of business in 2017.

== Design ==
The Nordic 40 is a recreational keelboat, built predominantly of single laminate fiberglass, with a balsa-cored deck and teak wood trim. It has a masthead sloop rig with painted aluminum spars, a raked stem, a reverse transom, a skeg-mounted rudder controlled by a wheel and a fixed fin keel. It displaces 18,000 lb (8,165 kg) and carries 7,091 lb (3,216 kg) of lead ballast.

The boat has a draft of 6.50 ft (1.98 m) with the standard keel fitted.

The boat is fitted with a Universal 44 hp (33 kW) diesel engine for docking and maneuvering. The fuel tank holds 55 U.S. gallons (210 L; 46 imp gal) and the fresh water tank has a capacity of 140 U.S. gallons (530 L; 120 imp gal).

The Norstar production version varies only in fitting a fold-down transom designed by Gary Nordvedt, to allow easier boarding.

The design has sleeping accommodation for six people. There is a bow cabin, with a "V"-berth, one straight and one "L"-settee berths in the main saloon along with a folding dinette table and an aft cabin with a double quarter berth under the cockpit. The U-shaped galley is located on the port side, at the foot of the companionway steps and includes a three-burner propane-fired stove, an oven and a 9 cu ft (0.25 m^{3}) icebox. The propane tanks are stowed in the stern lazarette well. The large head is locate on the port side, aft of the bow cabin and includes a large, molded fiberglass shower stall with a seat.

Ventilation is provided by hatches over the companionway, the main saloon and the bow cabin. There are also four Dorade boxes and six opening ports, in addition to two larger fixed ports.

For sailing there are five internal halyards, plus an internal topping lift, reefing lines and a spinnaker pole lift. The boat has seven winches provided as standard equipment. These consist of two primary genoa winches, a genoa and a mainsail halyard winch, a mainsheet winch, a reefing winch and an outhaul winch. The genoa has an inboard-mounted sheeting track and there is a mainsheet traveler on the coach house roof. The shrouds are also inboard-mounted. An adjustable backstay for racing was a factory option.

The design has a PHRF racing average handicap of 105.

== Operational history ==
In a 1994 review Richard Sherwood wrote, "the Nordic shows many of the hull features that have become popular since the late sixties. The hull is fine forward, has a short underwater length, and flattens aft toward the skeg and the spade rudder. The keel is short, thin, and quite deep. Overhangs are short."

Cruising World reviewer Gordon Meigs wrote, "my surveyor commented, 'When these were built, nobody in the United States was building a better boat.'"

In reviewing the Norstar-built Nordic 40 in 2010, Alvah Simon noted, "Overall, I concur with the Nordvedt brothers. The boat that Bob Perry drew way back in the 1970s was a very good design then and is a very good design now. If one is looking for a still stylish, sprightly, and fully capable ocean cruiser, they needn't look much farther...."

== See also ==
- List of sailing boat types

Related development

- Nordic 44

Similar sailboats

- Baltic 40
- Bayfield 40
- Bermuda 40
- Bristol 39
- Bristol 40
- Cal 39
- Cal 39 Mark II
- Cal 39 (Hunt/O'Day)
- Caliber 40
- Corbin 39
- Dickerson 41
- Endeavour 40
- Freedom 39
- Freedom 39 PH
- Islander 40
- Lord Nelson 41
- Nautical 39
