= Nordic 44 =

Sailboat class

Development
- Designer: Robert Perry
- Location: United States
- Year: 1980
- No. built: 39
- Builders: Nordic Yachts; Norstar Yachts
- Role: Racer-Cruiser
- Name: Nordic 44

Boat
- Displacement: 23,250 lb (10,546 kg)
- Draft: 7.00 ft (2.13 m)

Hull
- Type: Monohull
- Construction: Fiberglass
- LOA: 43.83 ft (13.36 m)
- LWL: 35.42 ft (10.80 m)
- Beam: 12.92 ft (3.94 m)
- Engine: Westerbeke 50 41 hp (31 kW) diesel engine

Hull appendages
- Keel: fin keel
- Ballast: 9,340 lb (4,237 kg)
- Rudder: skeg-mounted rudder

Rig
- Rig type: Bermuda rig
- I foretriangle height: 57.00 ft (17.37 m)
- J foretriangle base: 17.50 ft (5.33 m)
- P mainsail luff: 52.50 ft (16.00 m)
- E mainsail foot: 16.00 ft (4.88 m)

Sails
- Sailplan: Masthead sloop
- Mainsail area: 420.00 sq ft (39.019 m^{2})
- Jib/genoa area: 498.75 sq ft (46.335 m^{2})
- Total sail area: 918.75 sq ft (85.355 m^{2})

The Nordic 44 is an American sailboat that was designed by Robert Perry as a racer-cruiser and first built in 1980.

== Production ==
The design was built by Nordic Yachts in Bellingham, Washington, United States between 1980 and 1989, with 39 examples built. A luxury tax imposed in the US in 1991 caused the shut-down of the company.

Gary Nordvedt, the founder of Nordic Yachts established Norstar Yachts with his brother Steve, in Bellingham as a powerboat builder in 1994. He bought the old molds back and returned the Nordic 44 to production in 2009 as the Norstar 44, although the company went out of business in 2017.

== Design ==
The Nordic 44 is a recreational keelboat, built predominantly of fiberglass, with a balsa cored deck and hull and with wood trim. It has a masthead sloop rig, a raked stem, a reverse transom, an skeg-mounted rudder controlled by a wheel and a fixed fin keel, shoal draft keel or stub keel and centerboard.

A shorter rig version was also available, with a mast about 4.0 ft (1.2 m) lower.

The boat is fitted with a Westerbeke diesel engine of 41 hp (31 kW) for docking and maneuvering. The fuel tank holds 50 U.S. gallons (190 L; 42 imp gal) and the fresh water tank has a capacity of 150 U.S. gallons (570 L; 120 imp gal).

The design has sleeping accommodation for six people, with a double "V"-berth in the bow cabin, an L-shaped settee and a straight settee in the main cabin and an aft cabin with a double berth on the port side. The galley is located on the port side just forward of the companionway ladder. The galley is U-shaped and is equipped with a three-burner stove and a double sink. A navigation station is opposite the galley, on the starboard side. There are two heads, one just aft of the bow cabin on the port side and one on the starboard side in the aft cabin.

== Variants ==
Nordic 44
This model was introduced in 1980 and produced until 1989, with 39 boats built by Nordic Yachts. It has a length overall of 43.83 ft (13.4 m), a waterline length of 35.42 ft (10.8 m). The boat has a draft of 7.00 ft (2.13 m) with the standard keel and 5.5 ft (1.7 m) with the optional shoal draft keel. The centerboard-equipped model has a draft of 9.00 ft (2.74 m) with the centreboard extended and 5.00 ft (1.52 m) with it retracted. The full keel version displaces 23,250 lb (10,546 kg) and carries 9,340 lb (4,237 kg) of ballast. The centerboard-equipped model version displaces 24,000 lb (10,886 kg) and carries 9,400 lb (4,264 kg) of ballast.
Norstar 44
This model was introduced in 1995 and built until 2017 by Norstar Yachts. It has a length overall of 43.83 ft (13.4 m), a waterline length of 35.42 ft (10.8 m), displaces 24,000 lb (10,886 kg) and carries 9,340 lb (4,237 kg) of ballast. The boat has a draft of 7.00 ft (2.13 m) with the standard keel. The boat is fitted with a Japanese Yanmar diesel engine.

== See also ==
- List of sailing boat types

Related development

- Nordic 40

Similar sailboats

- C&C 44
- Corbin 39
- Hunter 44
- Gulfstar 43
