= Caliber 40 =

Sailboat class

Caliber 40 LRC
Development
- Designer: Michael McCreary
- Location: United States
- Year: 1995
- Builder: Caliber Yachts
- Role: Cruiser
- Name: Caliber 40 LRC

Boat
- Displacement: 21,600 lb (9,798 kg)
- Draft: 5.08 ft (1.55 m)

Hull
- Type: Monohull
- Construction: Fiberglass
- LOA: 40.92 ft (12.47 m)
- LWL: 32.50 ft (9.91 m)
- Beam: 12.67 ft (3.86 m)
- Engine: Yanmar 4JH3 (B)E 56 hp (42 kW) diesel engine

Hull appendages
- Keel: fin keel
- Ballast: 9,500 lb (4,309 kg)
- Rudder: skeg-mounted rudder

Rig
- Rig type: Bermuda rig
- I foretriangle height: 50.50 ft (15.39 m)
- J foretriangle base: 17.25 ft (5.26 m)
- P mainsail luff: 45.75 ft (13.94 m)
- E mainsail foot: 13.25 ft (4.04 m)

Sails
- Sailplan: Cutter rigged sloop
- Mainsail area: 303.09 sq ft (28.158 m^{2})
- Jib/genoa area: 435.56 sq ft (40.465 m^{2})
- Total sail area: 738.66 sq ft (68.624 m^{2})

The Caliber 40 is an American sailboat that was designed by Michael McCreary as a cruiser and first built in 1992.

== Production ==
The design was built by Caliber Yachts in the United States, starting in 1992, but it is now out of production.

== Design ==
The Caliber 40 is a recreational keelboat, built predominantly of fiberglass, with teak wood trim. It has a cutter rig, with anodized aluminum spars, a bowsprit, a raked stem and reverse transom, with a swing-down swimming ladder and hand-held shower. It features a skeg-mounted rudder controlled by a wheel and a fixed fin keel. The boat displaces 21,600 lb (9,798 kg) and carries 9,500 lb (4,309 kg) of ballast.

The design has sleeping accommodation for six people, with a double "V"-berth in the bow cabin, an L-shaped settee and a straight settee in the main cabin and an aft cabin with a double berth on the starboard side. The galley is located on the port side just forward of the companionway ladder. The galley is L-shaped and is equipped with a two-burner liquid petroleum gas stove, an oven, an 11 cu ft (0.31 m^{3}) icebox and a double sink. The cockpit also has its own icebox. A navigation station is at the aft end of the galley, on the port side. There are two heads, one in the bow cabin on the starboard side and one on the starboard side in the aft cabin, that can also be accessed from the main cabin. Both heads have showers, with hot and cold pressurized water. The interior is all finished in teak and has 74 in (188 cm) of headroom.

Ventilation is provided by 14 stainless steel opening ports, seven hatches and two deck vent cowlings.

For sailing the design is equipped with a mainsheet traveler to the deck. The halyards are mounted internally and the boat has two backstays. There are two speed, self-tailing winches for the mainsheet, halyards and the genoas. The outhaul is rigged internally and there is a main topping lift. The mainsail is equipped with two reefing points, with lines aft to the cockpit.

== Variants ==
Caliber 40
This model was introduced in 1992. The boat has a draft of 5.00 ft (1.52 m) with the standard keel fitted. The boat has a Japanese Yanmar LIJH3E diesel engine. The fuel tank holds 55 U.S. gallons (210 L; 46 imp gal) and the fresh water tank has a capacity of 156 U.S. gallons (590 L; 130 imp gal) and there is a 110 U.S. gallons (420 L; 92 imp gal) holding tank forward.
Caliber 40 LRC
This "Long Range Cruiser" model was introduced in 1995 and brought increased tank capacities, with aluminum fuel and water tanks. It has a draft of 5.08 ft (1.55 m) with the standard keel. The boat is fitted with a Japanese Yanmar 4JH3 (B)E 56 hp (42 kW) diesel engine. The fuel tank holds 212 U.S. gallons (800 L; 177 imp gal) and the fresh water tank has a capacity of 179 U.S. gallons (680 L; 149 imp gal).

== Operational history ==
In a 1994 review Richard Sherwood described the Caliber 40 as, "a big cutter for cruising, with high displacement, and lots of ballast for stability."

Jack Hornor reviewed the boat in the Spinsheet in January 2009, saying, "designed by Caliber’s co-founder, Michael McCreary, the Caliber 40 LRC is moderate in nearly every way. This underbody features a long, low-aspect fin keel and rudder supported by a skeg forward and is a good compromise between the performance benefits of fin-keeled, spade-rudder designs and the directional stability of traditional full-keel designs. Above the waterline, the Caliber 40 LRC is not likely to win any accolades for her classic beauty, but her appearance is well-balanced and contemporary."

Zuzana Prochazka wrote a review of the design in 2010 for boats.com, stating, "Caliber 40 from Caliber Yachts fits the bill as a couple's boat for blue water cruising ... The design is a moderately heavy displacement cruising boat so it takes a bit of wind to get her going. However, like most cruising boats of this class, sailing 5 – 5.5 knots in 10 – 12 knots of wind on a beam reach is not bad and can provide 140 mile plus days in the tradewinds. Although the sheeting angles have been tightened as the tracks have been brought inboard, sailing to within 60 degrees of the apparent wind can be expected. Although the boat will kick around in heavy seas, it will do so no more than other cruising boats and it will remain fairly comfortable in big waves as well as big winds."

A Blue Water Sailing reader survey summary concluded, "a lot of thought has gone into the conception, construction and marketing of the Caliber 40LRC(Long Range Cruiser). That’s your overriding thought as you study the plans and exhaustive product information provided by Caliber Yachts, Inc. of Clearwater, Florida. Owners of this boat who cruised through the Blue Water Sailing Subscriber Survey appear to be in complete agreement. Says one: 'A well constructed boat, interestingly conceived, reasonably priced.'"

A review in Sailing Magazine by Greta Reichelsdorfer concluded after a sail in the design, "I stepped back into the cockpit for a last look around deck. From the swim step with a freshwater shower to the tip of its sturdy anchor roller on the bowsprit, this boat is one well-built cruiser."

== See also ==
- List of sailing boat types

Similar sailboats

- Baltic 40
- Bayfield 40
- Bermuda 40
- Bristol 40
- Dickerson 41
- Endeavour 40
- Islander 40
- Lord Nelson 41
- Nordic 40
