= Bayfield 40 =

Sailboat class

Development
- Designer: Ted Gozzard
- Location: Canada
- Year: 1982
- Builder: Bayfield Boat Yard
- Role: Cruiser
- Name: Bayfield 40

Boat
- Displacement: 21,000 lb (9,525 kg)
- Draft: 4.92 ft (1.50 m)

Hull
- Type: Monohull
- Construction: Fibreglass
- LOA: 39.50 ft (12.04 m), 45.50 ft (13.87 m) including the bowsprit
- LWL: 30.50 ft (9.30 m)
- Beam: 12.00 ft (3.66 m)
- Engine: Yanmar 4JHE 44 hp (33 kW) diesel engine

Hull appendages
- Keel: long keel
- Ballast: 8,200 lb (3,719 kg)
- Rudder: keel-mounted rudder

Rig
- Rig type: Staysail ketch
- I foretriangle height: 52.00 ft (15.85 m)
- J foretriangle base: 19.78 ft (6.03 m)
- P mainsail luff: 41.50 ft (12.65 m)
- E mainsail foot: 13.50 ft (4.11 m)

Sails
- Sailplan: Ketch
- Mainsail area: 280.13 sq ft (26.025 m^{2})
- Jib/genoa area: 514.28 sq ft (47.778 m^{2})
- Total sail area: 794.41 sq ft (73.803 m^{2})

The Bayfield 40 is a Canadian sailboat that was designed by Ted Gozzard for cruising and first built in 1982.

== Production ==
The design was built by Bayfield Boat Yard in Clinton, Ontario, Canada, starting in 1984, but the company went out of business in 1988 after a factory fire and production ended then.

== Design ==
The Bayfield 40 is a recreational keelboat, built predominantly of balsa-cored fibreglass, with wood trim. It has a staysail ketch rig, with aluminum spars, a clipper bow with a bowsprit and trailboards, a raised counter transom, a keel-mounted rudder controlled by a wheel and a fixed long keel. It displaces 21,000 lb (9,525 kg) and carries 8,200 lb (3,719 kg) of lead ballast.

The boat has a draft of 4.92 ft (1.50 m) with the standard keel.

The boat is fitted with a Japanese Yanmar 4JHE diesel engine of 44 hp (33 kW) or a Westerbeke 52 hp (39 kW) diesel for docking and manoeuvring. The fresh water tank has a capacity of 100 U.S. gallons (380 L; 83 imp gal).

The design has sleeping accommodation for six people, with two double berths aft with optional raisable privacy panels in between and a U-shaped settee in the main cabin with a drop-down table that converts to a double berth. The galley is located on the port side forward. The galley is U-shaped and is equipped with a two-burner propane-fired stove, an electric refrigerator and a sink. A navigation station is aft of the galley, on the port side. The head is located just aft of the forepeak and includes a shower. The forepeak houses sail lockers and the anchor locker, accessible from the deck above.

Ventilation is provided by a port and hatch each in the aft cabins, plus two forward opening hatches and two opening ports in the head. There is a total of ten opening ports and four opening hatches, plus a large opening skylight just aft of the main mast.

For sailing the design is equipped with a total of 11 winches for the halyards and the sheets.

== Operational history ==
In a 1994 review of the Bayfield 40, Richard Sherwood wrote, "the lines of the hull are traditional. The foresail rig is unusual in a big ketch. Cabin layout, with a midships galley and no vee berths, is distinctly different."

== See also ==
- List of sailing boat types

Similar sailboats

- Baltic 40
- Bermuda 40
- Bristol 40
- Caliber 40
- Dickerson 41
- Endeavour 40
- Islander 40
- Lord Nelson 41
- Nordic 40
