= Lord Nelson 41 =

Sailboat class

Development
- Designer: Loren Hart
- Location: United States
- Year: 1982
- Builder: Lord Nelson Yachts
- Role: Cruiser
- Name: Lord Nelson 41

Boat
- Displacement: 30,500 lb (13,835 kg)
- Draft: 5.67 ft (1.73 m)

Hull
- Type: Monohull
- Construction: Fiberglass
- LOA: 41.00 ft (12.50 m)
- LWL: 36.20 ft (11.03 m)
- Beam: 12.83 ft (3.91 m)
- Engine: BMW D50 50 hp (37 kW) diesel engine

Hull appendages
- Keel: long keel
- Ballast: 11,000 lb (4,990 kg)
- Rudder: keel-mounted rudder

Rig
- Rig type: Bermuda rig
- I foretriangle height: 54.60 ft (16.64 m)
- J foretriangle base: 24.50 ft (7.47 m)
- P mainsail luff: 48.30 ft (14.72 m)
- E mainsail foot: 15.60 ft (4.75 m)

Sails
- Sailplan: Cutter rigged sloop
- Mainsail area: 376.74 sq ft (35.000 m^{2})
- Jib/genoa area: 668.85 sq ft (62.138 m^{2})
- Total sail area: 1,045.59 sq ft (97.138 m^{2})

The Lord Nelson 41 is an American sailboat that was designed by Loren Hart as a cruiser and first built in 1982.

== Production ==
The design was conceived by Loren and Lani Hart for their import company, Admiralty Ltd, which was incorporated in Wilmington, Delaware. The boats were actually built by the Ocean Eagle Yacht Building Corporation in Taiwan under contract and sold by Admiralty's subsidiary, Lord Nelson Yachts in the United States. The first boat was built in 1982, but it is now out of production.

== Design ==
The Lord Nelson 41 is a recreational keelboat, built predominantly of fiberglass, with wood trim. It has a cutter rig with a bowsprit and painted aluminum spars, a spooned raked stem, pronounced curve to the sheer-line, a rounded canoe transom, a keel-mounted rudder controlled by a wheel and a long fin keel. It displaces 30,500 lb (13,835 kg) and carries 11,000 lb (4,990 kg) of ballast.

The boat has a draft of 5.67 ft (1.73 m) with the standard keel fitted.

The boat is fitted with a German BMW D50 diesel engine of 50 hp (37 kW) for docking and maneuvering. The fuel tank holds 120 U.S. gallons (450 L; 100 imp gal) and the fresh water tank has a capacity of 200 U.S. gallons (760 L; 170 imp gal).

The design has sleeping accommodation for eight people, with a double side-entry berth on the port side of the bow cabin, an U-shaped settee that converts to a double berth and a straight settee in the main cabin, plus an aft cabin with a double berth on the starboard side and a quarter berth on the port side. Both cabins have built-in bookcases. The galley is located on the port side just forward of the companionway ladder. The galley is L-shaped and is equipped with a three-burner propane-fired stove and oven, plus a sink with hot and cold pressurized water. A navigation station is aft of the galley, on the port side. The head is located just aft of the bow cabin on the port side and includes a shower. There is also a sink in the aft cabin.

Ventilation is provided by 14 bronze portlights and three hatches that open.

For sailing the boat is equipped with three halyard winches, a mainsheet winch, two staysail winches and two jib winches. The large cockpit may be used for sleeping out. The lazarette includes two storage areas, one of which is a cockpit icebox.

== Operational history ==
In a 1994 review, Richard Sherwood wrote, "the designer must be a navigator, as he has his own berth at the navigation station. This is a big cutter intended for cruising. Hull design is traditional, as are the finishing touches, such as actual belaying pins and a Samson post."

Marine surveyor Richard Jordan reviewed the boat in 2010, writing, "The 41 Lord Nelson is a medieval styled cruiser. From the bulwarks to the bowsprit, she is lined with fine Burmese teak … It is an old fashioned look with bronze fastenings and the old world wood. Her extreme sheer is like that of the tug boats that they went on to build. The beam is amidships with moderate freeboard. The spoon bow with bobstay broadly expands for a spacious foredeck. The look exudes character." He concludes, "the Lord Nelson has medieval torture room flair. You cannot find teak like the Burmese that lines these classic yachts. On the used market, these sell for around $100,000 and are beautiful when maintained with an open checkbook."

== See also ==
- List of sailing boat types

Similar sailboats

- Baltic 40
- Bayfield 40
- Bristol 40
- Bermuda 40
- Caliber 40
- Dickerson 41
- Endeavour 40
- Irwin 41
- Irwin 41 Citation
- Islander 40
- Morgan Out Island 41
- Newport 41
- Nimbus 42
- Nordic 40
