= Nautical 39 =

Sailboat class

Development
- Designer: Charles Morgan and Roger Warren
- Location: United States
- Year: 1979
- Builder: Nautical Development Corp.
- Role: Cruiser
- Name: Nautical 39

Boat
- Displacement: 22,500 lb (10,206 kg)
- Draft: 5.33 ft (1.62 m)

Hull
- Type: Monohull
- Construction: Fiberglass
- LOA: 39.00 ft (11.89 m)
- LWL: 32.50 ft (9.91 m)
- Beam: 12.00 ft (3.66 m)
- Engine: 50 hp (37 kW) diesel inboard engine

Hull appendages
- Keel: modified long keel
- Rudder: skeg-mounted rudder

Rig
- Rig type: Bermuda rig

Sails
- Sailplan: Masthead sloop
- Mainsail area: 314 sq ft (29.2 m^{2})
- Jib/genoa area: 363 sq ft (33.7 m^{2})
- Total sail area: 677 sq ft (62.9 m^{2})

The Nautical 39 is an American sailboat that was designed by Charles Morgan and Roger Warren as a cruiser and first built in 1979.

The Nautical 39 is a development of the Morgan-designed West Indies 38.

== Production ==
The design was built by the Nautical Development Corp. in Largo, Florida, United States starting in 1979, but it is now out of production.

== Design ==
The Nautical 39 is a recreational keelboat, built predominantly of fiberglass, with teak trim. It has a masthead sloop rig with aluminum spars or optional ketch rig, a center cockpit, a raked stem, a vertical transom, a skeg-mounted rudder controlled by a wheel and a fixed modified long keel, with a cutaway forefoot. It displaces 22,500 lb (10,206 kg).

The boat has a draft of 5.33 ft (1.62 m) with the standard keel fitted.

The boat is fitted with a 50 hp (37 kW) diesel inboard engine for docking and maneuvering. The fuel tank holds 60 U.S. gallons (230 L; 50 imp gal) and the fresh water tank has a capacity of 200 U.S. gallons (760 L; 170 imp gal).

The design has sleeping accommodation for eight people. There is a double "V"-berth in the bow cabin, settee berths, including a port double, in the main cabin and a large aft cabin, with a raised deck above it. The galley is located on the starboard side, at the foot of the companionway steps and includes a three-burner stove, plus an oven and a 12 cu ft (0.34 m^{3}) icebox, with an optional refrigerator. There is a large chart table, which doubles as a work bench. There are two heads, one in the aft cabin with a shower and one in the bow cabin.

Ventilation is provided by opening ports and two hatches, one in the main cabin and one in the aft cabin.

The cockpit has a sheet winch, plus a mainsheet winch per side, on molded bases. The mast has two mounted halyard winches. The bow has an anchor roller.

== Operational history ==
In a 1994 review Richard Sherwood wrote, "the Nautical 39 is the smallest of the line, with other boats at 56 and 60 feet. With three cabins, two full heads, lots of water and fuel, and a center cockpit, she is designed for cruising. A ketch is also available."

== See also ==
- List of sailing boat types

Similar sailboats

- Baltic 40
- Cal 39
- Cal 39 Mark II
- Cal 39 (Hunt/O'Day)
- Corbin 39
- Freedom 39
- Freedom 39 PH
- Islander 40
- Nordic 40
