= Freedom 39 PH =

Sailboat class

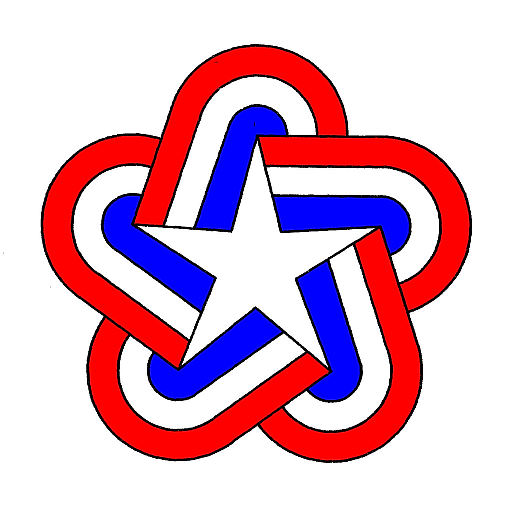

Development
- Designer: Ron Holland and Gary Hoyt
- Location: United States
- Year: 1983
- Builder: Freedom Yachts
- Role: Cruiser
- Name: Freedom 39 PH

Boat
- Displacement: 18,500 lb (8,391 kg)
- Draft: 5.50 ft (1.68 m)

Hull
- Type: Monohull
- Construction: Fiberglass
- LOA: 39.00 ft (11.89 m)
- LWL: 31.00 ft (9.45 m)
- Beam: 12.83 ft (3.91 m)
- Engine: Perkins Engines 50 hp (37 kW) diesel engine

Hull appendages
- Keel: fin keel
- Ballast: 5,300 lb (2,404 kg)
- Rudder: skeg-mounted rudder

Rig
- Rig type: Cat-rigged schooner
- P mainsail luff: 44.50 ft (13.56 m)
- E mainsail foot: 17.50 ft (5.33 m)

Sails
- Sailplan: Cat-rigged schooner
- Mainsail area: 456 sq ft (42.4 m^{2})
- Jib/genoa area: 288 sq ft (26.8 m^{2})
- Total sail area: 744 sq ft (69.1 m^{2})

The Freedom 39 PH is an American pilothouse schooner sailboat that was designed by Ron Holland and Gary Hoyt as a cruiser and first built in 1983.

The Freedom 39 PH was introduced at the same time as the related Freedom 39 design, a boat with a similar hull, but a ketch rig and a conventional aft cockpit, without a pilothouse.

== Production ==
The boat was built by Tillotson Pearson in the United States for Freedom Yachts, starting in 1983.

== Design ==
The Freedom 39 PH is a recreational keelboat, built predominantly of fiberglass using a balsa core, with wooden trim. It is a cat-rigged schooner, with carbon-fiber conventional booms and two free-standing carbon-fiber masts. It has an aft cockpit and a low-mounted pilothouse forward of the cockpit. It features a raked stem, a slightly reverse transom, a skeg-mounted rudder controlled by a wheel and a fixed fin keel. The pilothouse has a second wheel for steering. The design displaces 18,500 lb (8,391 kg) and carries 5,300 lb (2,404 kg) of ballast.

The boat has a draft of 5.50 ft (1.68 m) with the standard keel fitted.

The boat is fitted with a British Perkins Engines 50 hp (37 kW) for docking and maneuvering. The fuel tank holds 100 U.S. gallons (380 L; 83 imp gal) and the fresh water tank has a capacity of 160 U.S. gallons (610 L; 130 imp gal).

The design has sleeping accommodations for six people. It has a private, aft, double cabin, under the cockpit, accessed from the pilothouse, a double settee berth in the pilothouse and a double "V"-berth in the bow cabin. There is a captain's chair in the pilothouse, along with a navigation station. The galley is U-shaped and located just aft of the bow cabin. It includes a three-burner propane stove, an oven and double sinks. There are two separate heads, one just aft of the bow cabin on the starboard side, opposite the galley and another in the aft cabin on the port side. The forward head includes a molded fiberglass shower.

Ventilation is provided by two opening ports in the aft cabin and four hatches, located over the bow cabin, the forward head, the galley and the main cabin.

All sail controls are led to the cockpit which includes two winches and sheet stoppers. The halyards, the reefing lines and the boom vang for the aft mast are all controlled from the cockpit.

== Operational history ==
In a 1994 review Richard Sherwood wrote, "this cruiser was designed to offer the advantages of a schooner but with improved windward sailing characteristics. Since there is no forestay it cannot sag, and upwind performance is improved. The pilothouse is very low and does not block vision from the cockpit."

== See also ==
- List of sailing boat types

Related development

- Freedom 39

Similar sailboats

- Baltic 40
- Cal 39
- Cal 39 Mark II
- Cal 39 (Hunt/O'Day)
- Corbin 39
- Islander 40
- Nautical 39
- Nordic 40
