= Bristol 40 =

Sailboat class

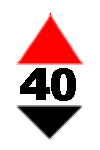
- Class symbol

Development
- Designer: Ted Hood
- Location: United States
- Year: 1970
- No. built: 149
- Builder: Bristol Yachts
- Role: Racer-Cruiser
- Name: Bristol 40

Boat
- Displacement: 17,580 lb (7,974 kg)
- Draft: 5.40 ft (1.65 m)

Hull
- Type: Monohull
- Construction: Fiberglass
- LOA: 40.20 ft (12.25 m)
- LWL: 27.54 ft (8.39 m)
- Beam: 10.80 ft (3.29 m)
- Engine: Universal Atomic 4 30 hp (22 kW) gasoline engine

Hull appendages
- Keel: modified long keel
- Ballast: 6,500 lb (2,948 kg)
- Rudder: keel-mounted rudder

Rig
- Rig type: Bermuda rig
- I foretriangle height: 45.50 ft (13.87 m)
- J foretriangle base: 14.60 ft (4.45 m)
- P mainsail luff: 39.50 ft (12.04 m)
- E mainsail foot: 16.00 ft (4.88 m)

Sails
- Sailplan: Masthead sloop
- Mainsail area: 316.00 sq ft (29.357 m^{2})
- Jib/genoa area: 332.15 sq ft (30.858 m^{2})
- Total sail area: 648.15 sq ft (60.215 m^{2})

Racing
- PHRF: 166 (average)

The Bristol 40 is an American sailboat that was designed by Ted Hood as a racer-cruiser and first built in 1970.

== Production ==
The Bristol 39 was produced 1966-1970 and was replaced in production by the Bristol 40, which was built from 1970-1986. Both are related designs, from the same hull molds. They have same the same principle dimensions, but have different lengths overall.

The Bristol 40 was built by Bristol Yachts in Bristol, Rhode Island, United States. The company produced 149 examples of the type, but it is now out of production.

== Design ==
The Bristol 40 is a recreational keelboat, built predominantly of fiberglass, with wood trim. It has a masthead sloop rig, or an optional cutter or yawl rig, all with aluminum spars. It features a spooned raked stem, a raised counter reverse transom, a keel-mounted rudder controlled by an Edson wheel and a fixed modified long keel, with a cutaway forefoot. A stub keel and centerboard was optional. It displaces 17,580 lb (7,974 kg) and carries 6,500 lb (2,948 kg) of lead ballast.

The boat has a draft of 5.40 ft (1.65 m) with the standard long keel, while the centreboard-equipped version has a draft of 7.8 ft (2.4 m) with the centreboard extended and 4.0 ft (1.2 m) with it retracted, allowing operation in shallow water.

The boat is fitted with a Universal Atomic 4 30 hp (22 kW) gasoline engine for docking and maneuvering, although a Westerbeke diesel engine was a factory option. The fuel tank holds 31 U.S. gallons (120 L; 26 imp gal) and the fresh water tank has a capacity of 130 U.S. gallons (490 L; 110 imp gal).

The design has sleeping accommodation for six people, with a double "V"-berth in the bow cabin, an U-shaped settee and dinette table on the port side of the main cabin that converts to a double berth. There is a straight settee, with a pipe berth above it, also in the main cabin. The galley is located on the port side, just forward of the companionway ladder. The galley is equipped with a three-burner alcohol-fired stove, an oven and a sink. A navigation station is opposite the galley, on the starboard side. The head is located just aft of the bow cabin on the port side and includes a shower.

The bow cabin has a double-hinged hatch for ventilation, that can be opened facing forward or aft. There is also a dorade box on the forward deck.

For sailing the boat has two cockpit-mounted primary jib winches, plus two secondary ones, plus a jib halyard winch as standard equipment. Jiffy reefing and a bow-mounted anchor roller were also standard.

The design has a PHRF racing average handicap of 166.

== Operational history ==
In a 1994 review Richard Sherwood wrote, "the Bristol 40 is designed as a racer-cruiser. Many options, including a yawl rig, and several interior layouts are available for the owner who favors cruising. This boat, with its long bow and counter and full keel, is not for round-the-marker sailing, but it will do well on longer races."

Bob Pingel, writing in Sailing Magazine in 2011 noted, "the boat sails quite well in moderate conditions, especially off the wind. The hull shape is designed for reaching and the 40 has won its class in the Marion to Bermuda race twice. Owners report that reefing early is the best way to deal with the initial tenderness and keep the boat on its lines. Upwind, the centerboard helps the boat track, and while it is not particularly close winded, it doesn't make a lot of leeway and the motion is soft." Of the optional yawl rig, he stated, "A yawl was optional and I confess, as impractical as a yawl is, they sure are beautiful. The yawl, like the centerboard, was favored by the CCA rule because sail area aft of the rudder post was not counted in your rating. And there's no better place to mount a radar dome anyway."

== See also ==
- List of sailing boat types

Related development

- Bristol 39

Similar sailboats

- Baltic 40
- Bayfield 40
- Bermuda 40
- Caliber 40
- Dickerson 41
- Endeavour 40
- Islander 40
- Lord Nelson 41
- Nordic 40
