= Islander 40 =

Sailboat class

Development
- Designer: Doug Peterson
- Location: United States
- Year: 1979
- Builder: Islander Yachts
- Role: Racer-Cruiser
- Name: Islander 40

Boat
- Displacement: 17,000 lb (7,711 kg)
- Draft: 7.17 ft (2.19 m)

Hull
- Type: Monohull
- Construction: Fiberglass with Divinycell core deck
- LOA: 39.54 ft (12.05 m)
- LWL: 30.83 ft (9.40 m)
- Beam: 11.83 ft (3.61 m)
- Engine: Volkswagen Pathfinder 50MF 42 hp (31 kW) diesel engine

Hull appendages
- Keel: fin keel
- Ballast: 7,700 lb (3,493 kg)
- Rudder: spade-type rudder

Rig
- Rig type: Bermuda rig
- I foretriangle height: 53.00 ft (16.15 m)
- J foretriangle base: 16.50 ft (5.03 m)
- P mainsail luff: 47.50 ft (14.48 m)
- E mainsail foot: 12.50 ft (3.81 m)

Sails
- Sailplan: Masthead sloop
- Mainsail area: 296.88 sq ft (27.581 m^{2})
- Jib/genoa area: 437.25 sq ft (40.622 m^{2})
- Total sail area: 734.13 sq ft (68.203 m^{2})

Racing
- PHRF: 82

The Islander 40 is an American sailboat that was designed by Doug Peterson as a racer-cruiser and first built in 1979.

== Production ==
The design was built by Islander Yachts in the United States starting in 1979, but it is now out of production. There were only 57 made.

== Design ==
The Islander 40 is a recreational keelboat, built predominantly of fiberglass with a Divinycell (cross-linked PVC foam core) deck and oiled teak trim. It has a masthead sloop rig with aluminum spars, a raked stem, a raised reverse transom, an internally mounted spade-type rudder controlled by a wheel and a fixed fin keel. It displaces 17,000 lb (7,711 kg) and carries 7,700 lb (3,493 kg) of lead ballast.

The boat has a draft of 7.17 ft (2.19 m) with the standard keel and 5.16 ft (1.57 m) with the optional shoal draft keel. Shoal draft models were normally fitted with a shorter rig.

The boat is fitted with a Volkswagen Pathfinder 50MF diesel engine of 42 hp (31 kW) for docking and maneuvering. The fuel tank holds 35 U.S. gallons (130 L; 29 imp gal) and the fresh water tank has a capacity of 60 U.S. gallons (230 L; 50 imp gal).

The design has sleeping accommodation for six people. There is a private bow cabin with a "V"-berth, an aft cabin under the cockpit with a quarter berth and two settee berths in the main cabin, along with a pilot berth above on the port side. The galley is located at the foot of the companionway steps on the port side and features a three-burner, propane-fired stove and an oven. Both pressurized water and foot-pump water is available. The navigation station is located on the starboard side, opposite the galley. The head is located just aft of the bow cabin, on the port side and includes a shower with a teak grating over the sump.

Ventilation is provided by six opening ports, with opening hatches over the bow cabin and the main cabin.

For sailing there is a mainsheet traveler on the coach house roof. There are two winches for the jib in the cockpit and winches for the mainsail and jib halyards. All sheets and halyards lead to the cockpit or the aft part of the coach house roof. Secondary winches and a baby stay were factory options. The boat is equipped with a topping lift, internally- mounted outhaul and reefing.

The design has a PHRF racing average handicap of 82.

== See also ==
- List of sailing boat types

Similar sailboats

- Baltic 40
- Bayfield 40
- Bermuda 40
- Bristol 39
- Bristol 40
- Cal 39
- Cal 39 Mark II
- Cal 39 (Hunt/O'Day)
- Caliber 40
- Corbin 39
- Dickerson 41
- Endeavour 40
- Freedom 39
- Freedom 39 PH
- Lord Nelson 41
- Nautical 39
- Nordic 40
