= Freedom 39 =

Sailboat class

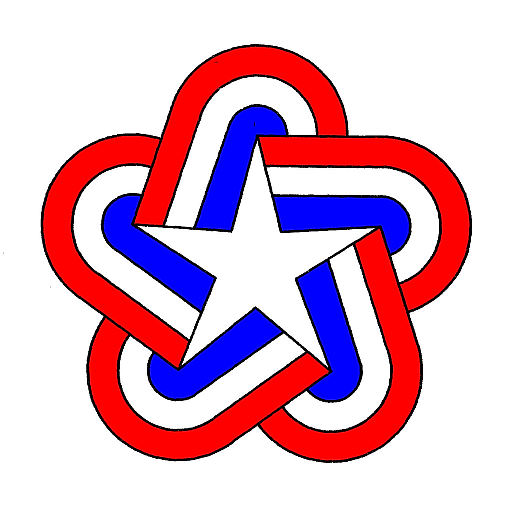

Development
- Designer: Ron Holland and Gary Hoyt
- Location: United States
- Year: 1983
- Builder: Freedom Yachts
- Role: Cruiser
- Name: Freedom 39

Boat
- Displacement: 18,500 lb (8,391 kg)
- Draft: 5.50 ft (1.68 m)

Hull
- Type: Monohull
- Construction: Fiberglass
- LOA: 39.00 ft (11.89 m)
- LWL: 31.00 ft (9.45 m)
- Beam: 12.83 ft (3.91 m)
- Engine: Perkins Engines 4-108 50 hp (37 kW) diesel engine

Hull appendages
- Keel: fin keel
- Ballast: 5,300 lb (2,404 kg)
- Rudder: skeg-mounted rudder

Rig
- Rig type: Cat-rigged ketch
- P mainsail luff: 44.50 ft (13.56 m)
- E mainsail foot: 17.50 ft (5.33 m)

Sails
- Sailplan: Cat-rigged ketch
- Mainsail area: 389.38 sq ft (36.175 m^{2})
- Other sails: Mizzen: 232.44 sq ft (21.594 m^{2})
- Total sail area: 621.82 sq ft (57.769 m^{2})

The Freedom 39, also called the Freedom 39 Express, is an American sailboat that was designed by Ron Holland and Gary Hoyt as a cruiser and first built in 1983.

The Freedom 39 was introduced at the same time as the related Freedom 39 PH design, a boat with a similar hull, but a schooner rig and a pilothouse.

== Production ==
The boat was built by Tillotson Pearson in the United States for Freedom Yachts, starting in 1983.

== Design ==
The Freedom 39 is a recreational keelboat, built predominantly of fiberglass, with wooden trim. It is a cat-rigged ketch, with carbon-fiber conventional booms and two free-standing carbon-fiber masts. It has an aft cockpit and features a raked stem, a slightly reverse transom, a skeg-mounted rudder controlled by a wheel and a fixed fin keel. The design displaces 18,500 lb (8,391 kg) and carries 5,300 lb (2,404 kg) of lead ballast.

The boat has a draft of 5.50 ft (1.68 m) with the standard keel fitted.

The boat is fitted with a British Perkins Engines 4-108 50 hp (37 kW) for docking and maneuvering. The fuel tank holds 80 U.S. gallons (300 L; 67 imp gal) and the fresh water tank has a capacity of 130 U.S. gallons (490 L; 110 imp gal).

The design has sleeping accommodations for six people. It has a private, aft, double cabin, under the cockpit on the starboard side, two pilot berths in the main cabin and a double berth in the bow cabin. The galley is U-shaped and located on the port side, at the foot of the companionway steps. It includes a three-burner stove and double sinks. The head is located just aft of the bow cabin on the starboard side.

== See also ==
- List of sailing boat types

Related development

- Freedom 39 PH

Similar sailboats

- Baltic 40
- Cal 39
- Cal 39 Mark II
- Cal 39 (Hunt/O'Day)
- Corbin 39
- Islander 40
- Nautical 39
- Nordic 40
