= Hunter 410 =

Sailboat class

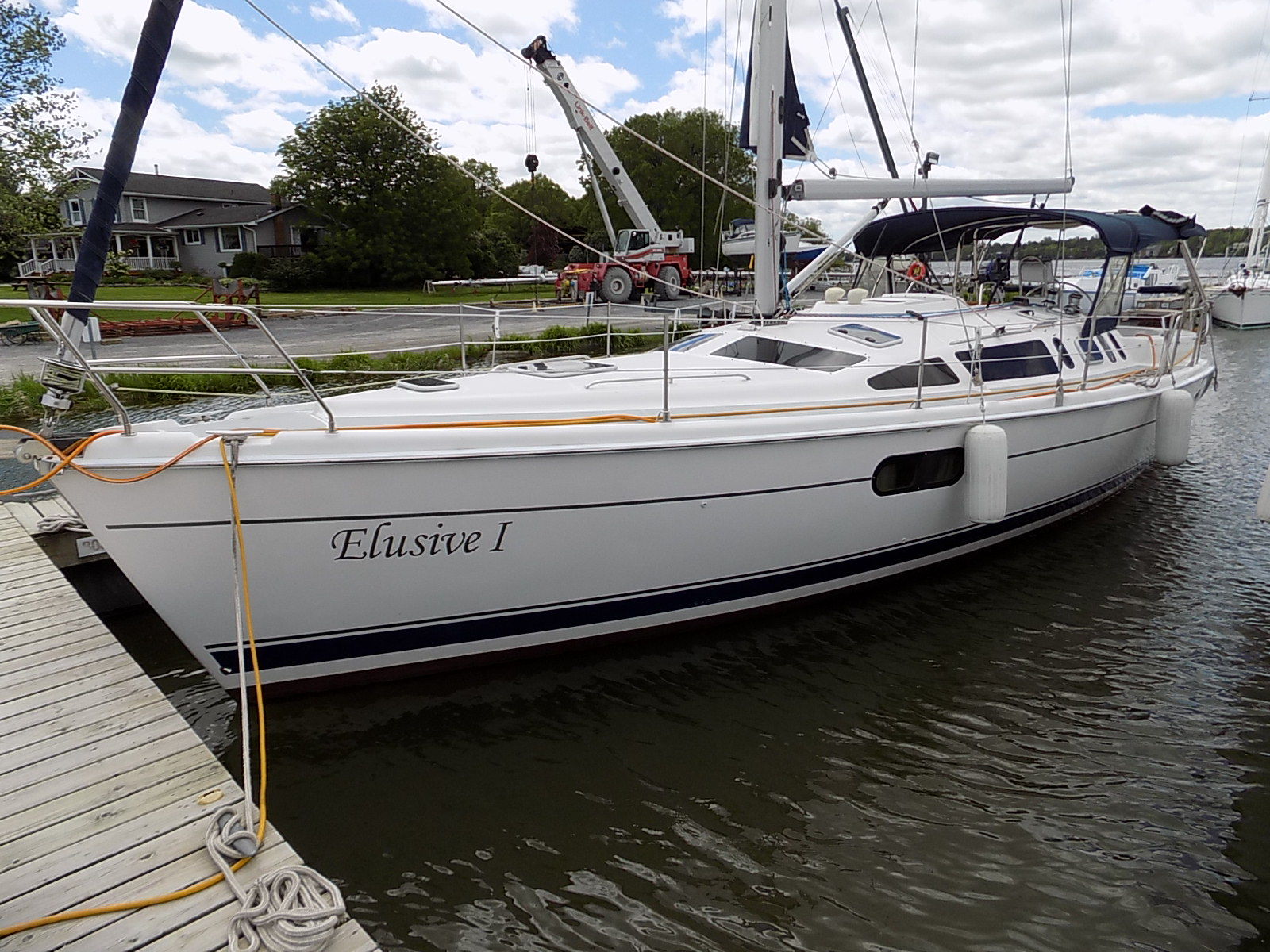

Development
- Designer: Hunter Design Team
- Location: United States
- Year: 1998
- Builder: Hunter Marine
- Name: Hunter 410

Boat
- Displacement: 20,200 lb (9,163 kg)
- Draft: 5.00 ft (1.52 m)

Hull
- Type: Monohull
- Construction: Fiberglass
- LOA: 43.42 ft (13.23 m)
- LWL: 37.83 ft (11.53 m)
- Beam: 13.83 ft (4.22 m)
- Engine: Yanmar 50 hp (37 kW) diesel engine

Hull appendages
- Keel: fin keel or wing keel
- Ballast: 7,400 lb (3,357 kg)
- Rudder: internally-mounted spade-type rudder

Rig
- General: Fractional rigged sloop Masthead sloop
- I foretriangle height: 47.77 ft (14.56 m)
- J foretriangle base: 16.16 ft (4.93 m)
- P mainsail luff: 45.25 ft (13.79 m)
- E mainsail foot: 19.25 ft (5.87 m)

Sails
- Mainsail area: 435.53 sq ft (40.462 m^{2})
- Jib/genoa area: 385.98 sq ft (35.859 m^{2})
- Total sail area: 821.51 sq ft (76.321 m^{2})

Racing
- PHRF: 108 (average)

The Hunter 410 is an American sailboat, that was designed by the Hunter Design Team and first built in 1998.

== Production ==
The boat was built by Hunter Marine in the United States, but it is now out of production.

== Design ==
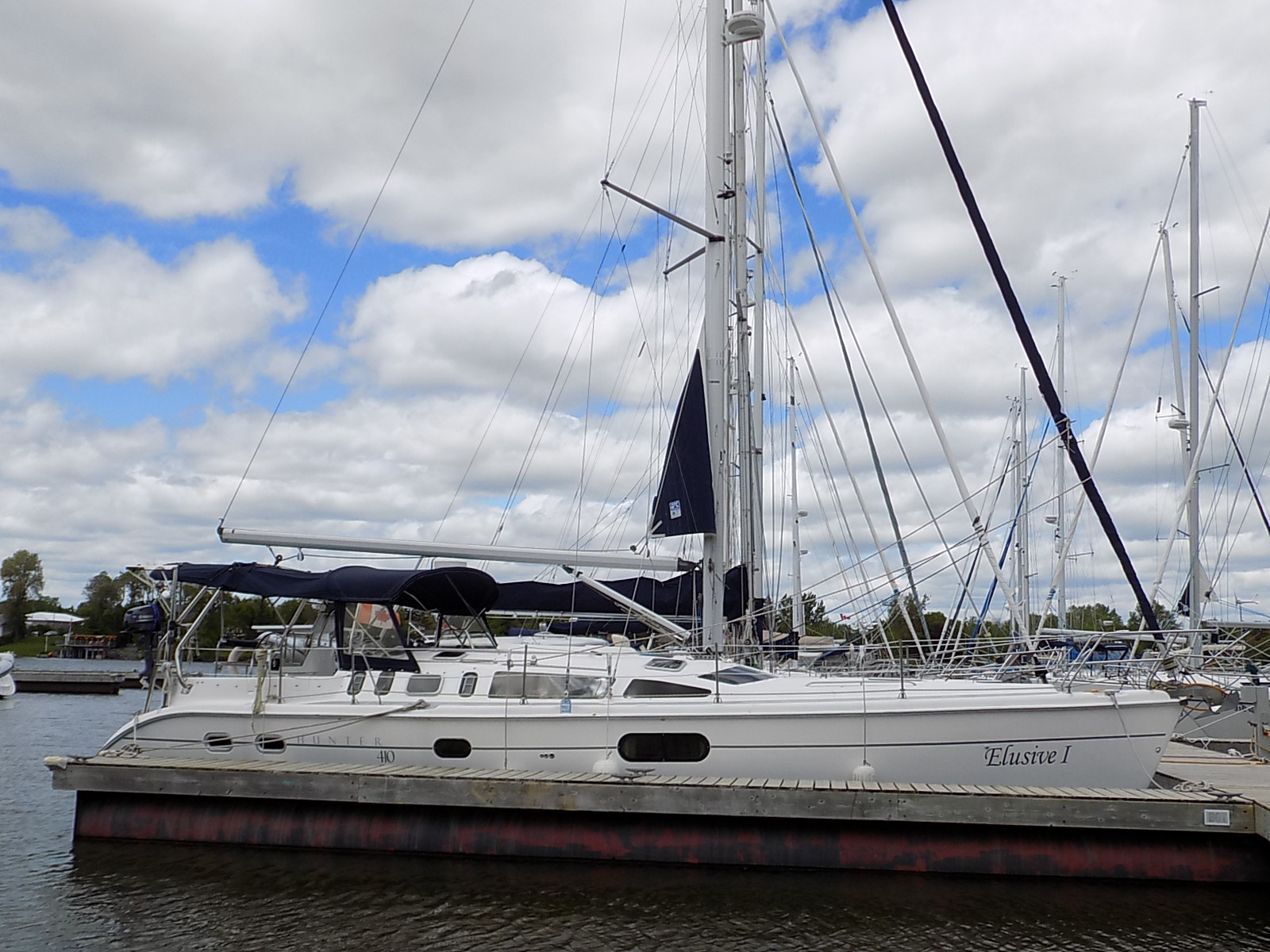
Hunter 410

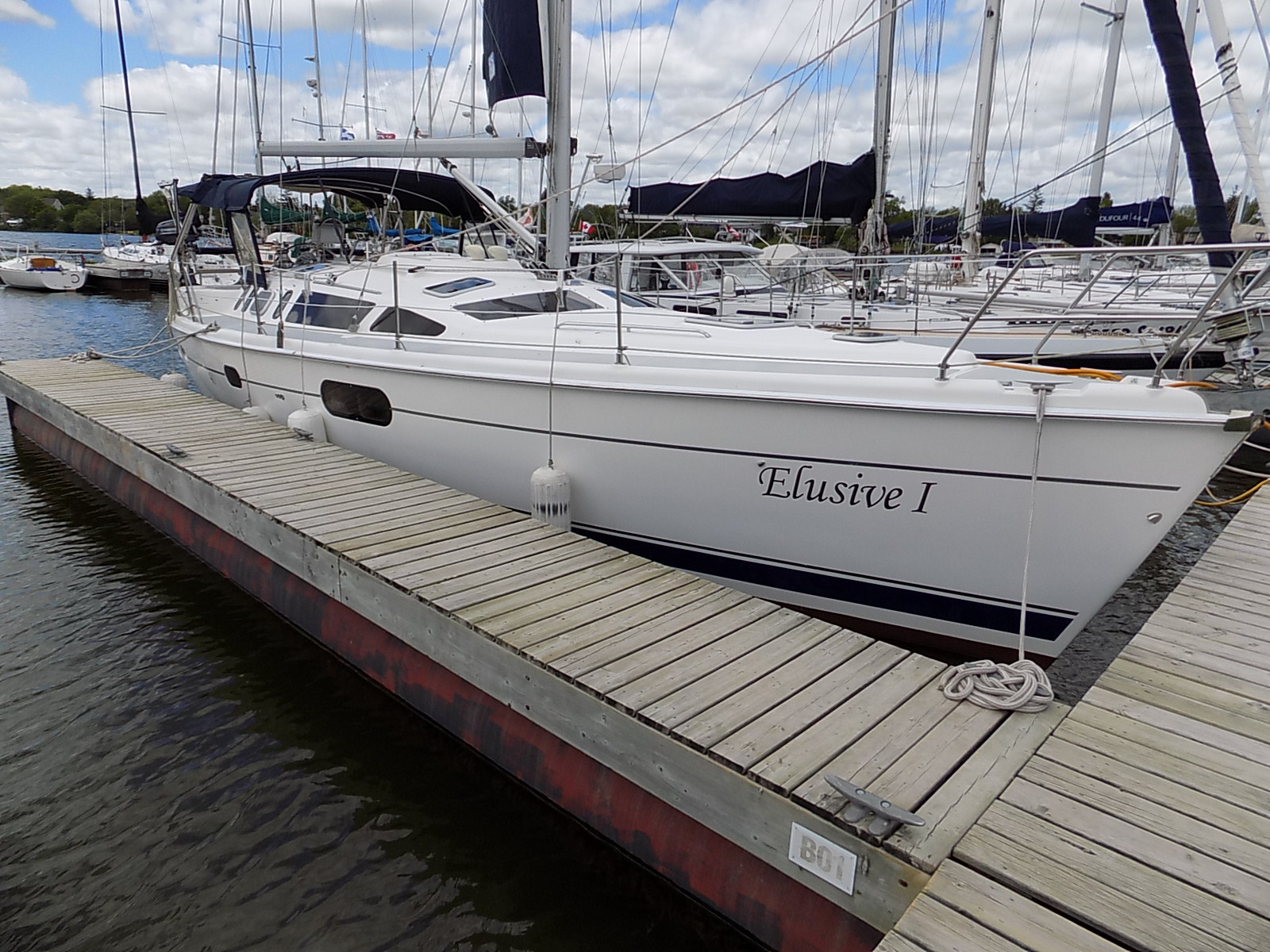
Hunter 410

The Hunter 410 is a recreational cruising keelboat, built predominantly of fiberglass. It has a B&R rig, an internally-mounted spade-type rudder and a fixed deep draft fin keel or wing keel. It displaces 20,200 lb (9,163 kg) and carries 7,400 lb (3,357 kg) of lead ballast.

The boat has a draft of 5.00 ft (1.52 m) with the standard wing keel and 6.33 ft (1.93 m) with the optional full fin keel.

The boat is fitted with a Japanese Yanmar 4JH2E diesel engine of 50 hp (37 kW). The fuel tank holds 51 U.S. gallons (190 L; 42 imp gal) and a fresh water tank capacity of 147 U.S. gallons (560 L; 122 imp gal).

The boat has a PHRF racing average handicap of 108 with a high of 117 and low of 96. It has a hull speed of 8.24 kn (15.26 km/h).

== See also ==
- List of sailing boat types

Similar boats

- Corbin 39
