= Gulfstar 43 =

Sailboat class

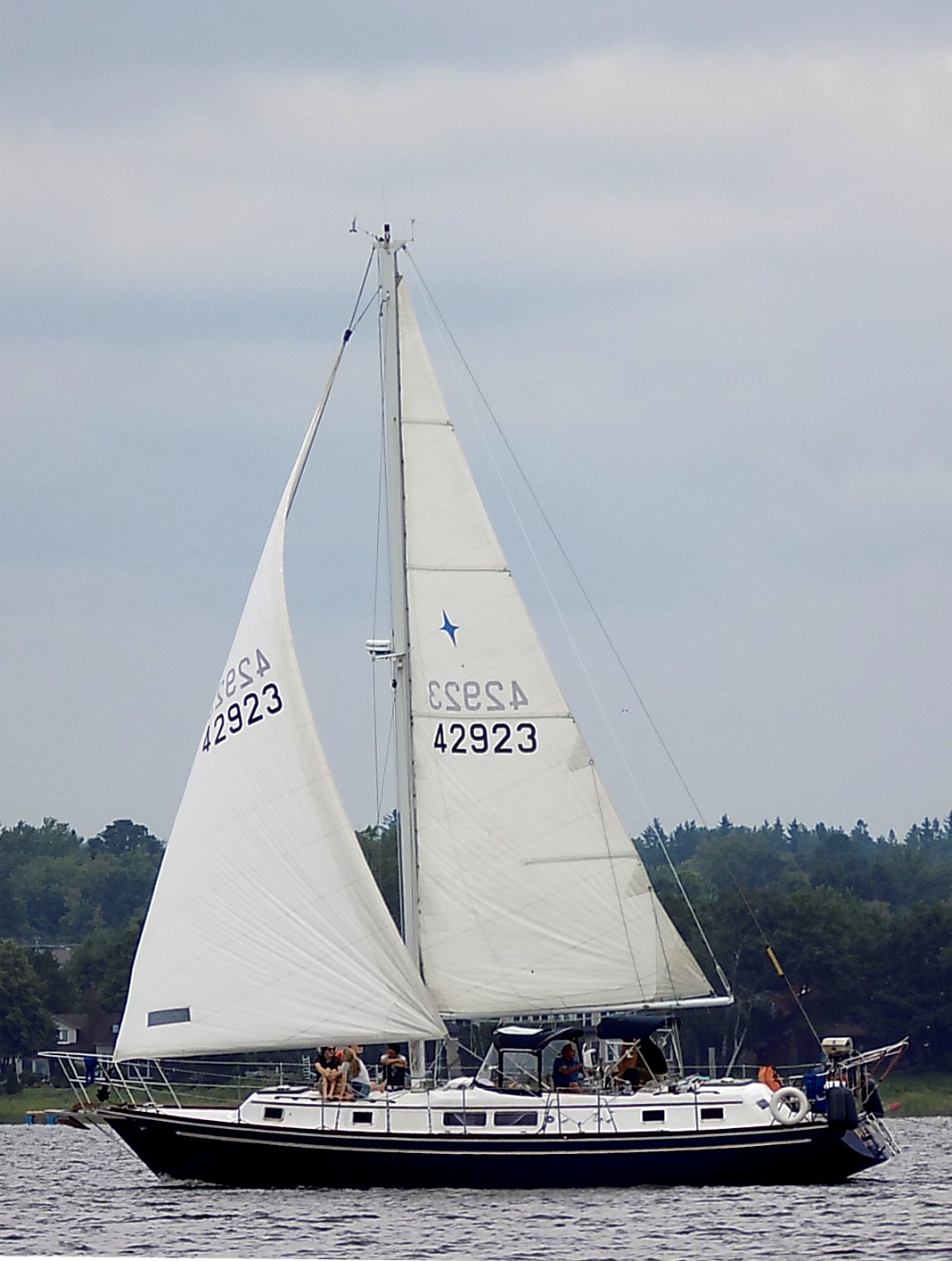
- Gulfstar 43 Mark II

Development
- Designer: Vince & Richard Lazzara
- Location: United States
- Year: 1971
- No. built: 80 (plus 10 MS models)
- Builder: Gulfstar Yachts
- Name: Gulfstar 43

Boat
- Displacement: 21,000 lb (9,525 kg)
- Draft: 3.50 ft (1.07 m)

Hull
- Type: Monohull
- Construction: Fiberglass
- LOA: 43.33 ft (13.21 m)
- LWL: 39.16 ft (11.94 m)
- Beam: 11.92 ft (3.63 m)
- Engine: Perkins Engines diesel engine

Hull appendages
- Keel: long keel
- Ballast: 5,000 lb (2,268 kg)
- Rudder: keel-mounted rudder

Rig
- Rig type: Bermuda rig
- I foretriangle height: 44.90 ft (13.69 m)
- J foretriangle base: 14.92 ft (4.55 m)
- P mainsail luff: 38.70 ft (11.80 m)
- E mainsail foot: 17.00 ft (5.18 m)

Sails
- Sailplan: Masthead sloop
- Mainsail area: 328.95 sq ft (30.560 m^{2})
- Jib/genoa area: 334.95 sq ft (31.118 m^{2})
- Total sail area: 663.90 sq ft (61.678 m^{2})

The Gulfstar 43 is an American sailboat that was designed by Vince and Richard Lazzara as a cruiser and first built in 1971.

== Production ==
The design was built by Gulfstar Yachts in the United States, between 1971 and 1978, but it is now out of production.

== Design ==
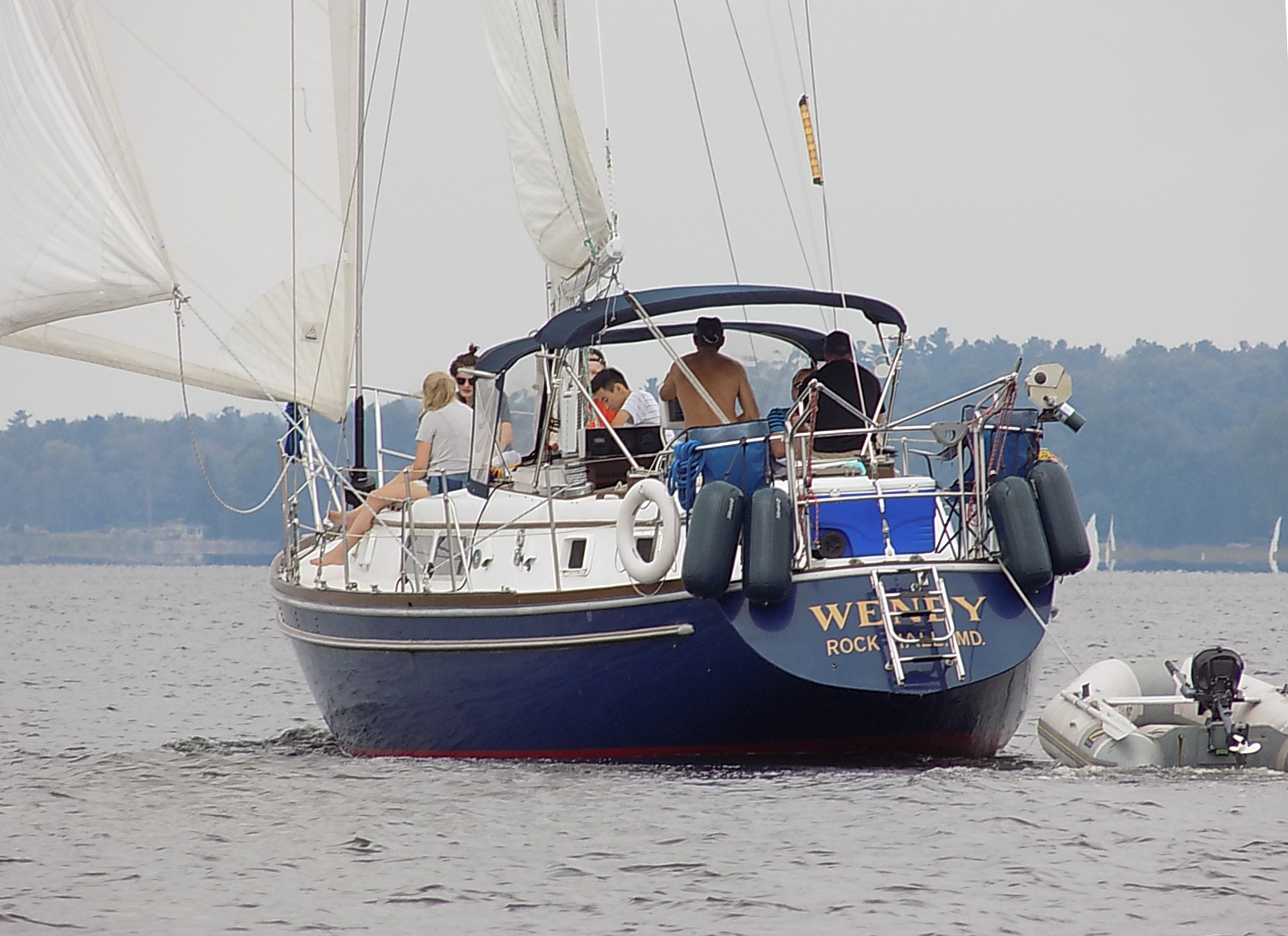
Gulfstar 43 Mark II

The Gulfstar 43 is a recreational keelboat, built predominantly of fiberglass, with wood trim. It has a masthead sloop rig or optional ketch rig, a raked stem, a vertical transom, a keel-mounted rudder controlled by a wheel and a fixed long keel. It displaces 21,000 lb (9,525 kg) and carries 5,000 lb (2,268 kg) of ballast.

The boat has a draft of 3.50 ft (1.07 m) with the standard long keel fitted.

The boat is fitted with a British Perkins Engines diesel engine. The fuel tank holds 65 U.S. gallons (250 L; 54 imp gal) and the fresh water tank has a capacity of 115 U.S. gallons (440 L; 96 imp gal).

== Variants ==
Gulfstar 43 MS
This model was introduced in 1971 and ten were built before production ended in 1973. It has a length overall of 43.33 ft (13.2 m), a waterline length of 39.17 ft (11.9 m) and a beam of 13.92 ft (4.2 m). The boat has a draft of 3.50 ft (1.07 m) with the standard keel and a hull speed of 8.39 kn (15.54 km/h).
Gulfstar 43
This model was introduced in 1976 and 80 were built before production ended in 1978. It has a length overall of 43.33 ft (13.2 m), a waterline length of 39.16 ft (11.9 m) and a beam of 11.92 ft (3.6 m). The boat has a draft of 3.50 ft (1.07 m) with the standard keel and a hull speed of 8.39 kn (15.54 km/h).
Gulfstar 43 Mark II
Improved model.

== See also ==
- List of sailing boat types

Similar sailboats

- Hunter 44
- C&C 44
- Nordic 44
