= Cal 39 =

Sailboat class

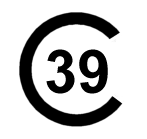
- Class symbol

Development
- Designer: C. William Lapworth
- Location: United States
- Year: 1970
- No. built: 29
- Builder: Jensen Marine/Cal Yachts
- Role: Racer-Cruiser
- Name: Cal 39

Boat
- Displacement: 14,600 lb (6,622 kg)
- Draft: 6.00 ft (1.83 m)

Hull
- Type: Monohull
- Construction: Fiberglass
- LOA: 38.69 ft (11.79 m)
- LWL: 31.25 ft (9.53 m)
- Beam: 11.67 ft (3.56 m)
- Engine: Perkins Engines 4108 diesel engine

Hull appendages
- Keel: fin keel
- Ballast: 6,600 lb (2,994 kg)
- Rudder: skeg-mounted rudder

Rig
- Rig type: Bermuda rig
- I foretriangle height: 50.00 ft (15.24 m)
- J foretriangle base: 17.00 ft (5.18 m)
- P mainsail luff: 41.75 ft (12.73 m)
- E mainsail foot: 15.00 ft (4.57 m)

Sails
- Sailplan: Masthead sloop
- Mainsail area: 313.13 sq ft (29.091 m^{2})
- Jib/genoa area: 425.00 sq ft (39.484 m^{2})
- Total sail area: 738.13 sq ft (68.575 m^{2})

The Cal 39 is an American sailboat that was designed by C. William Lapworth as a racer-cruiser and first built in 1970. The boat was introduced just before the adoption of the International Offshore Rule (IOR) for racing and, as a consequence of not meeting that rule, saw low sales numbers. It was not in production long and was replaced by the Cal 39 Mark II.

== Production ==
The design was built by Jensen Marine/Cal Yachts (Bangor Punta) in the United States. The company built 29 examples of the type starting in 1970 and ending in 1971, but it is now out of production.

Production of the design was cut short when first year sales did not match expectations, due to the boat not fitting the newly adopted IOR racing rules. It was replaced in the product line by the newly designed Cal 39 Mark II in 1978. The Mark II was later supplanted by the Cal 39 Mark III in 1983 and then the Cal 39 (Hunt/O'Day) in 1988. All four designs were sold as "Cal 39s".

== Design ==
The Cal 39 is a recreational keelboat, built predominantly of fiberglass, with wood trim. It has a masthead sloop rig, a raked stem, a slightly raised counter reverse transom, a skeg-mounted rudder controlled by a wheel and a fixed fin keel. It displaces 14,600 lb (6,622 kg) and carries 6,600 lb (2,994 kg) of lead ballast. A tall rig was available, with a mast about 4 ft (1.2 m) higher.

The boat has a draft of 6.00 ft (1.83 m) with the standard keel and 6.50 ft (1.98 m) with the optional deep draft keel.

The boat is fitted with a British Perkins Engines 4108 diesel engine for docking and maneuvering. The fuel tank holds 35 U.S. gallons (130 L; 29 imp gal) and the fresh water tank has a capacity of 64 U.S. gallons (240 L; 53 imp gal).

== See also ==
- List of sailing boat types

Similar sailboats

- Baltic 40
- Corbin 39
- Freedom 39
- Freedom 39 PH
- Islander 40
- Nautical 39
- Nordic 40
