= Cal 39 (Hunt/O'Day) =

Sailboat class

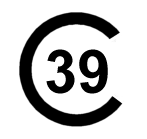
- Class symbol

Development
- Designer: C. Raymond Hunt and Associates
- Location: United States
- Year: 1988
- Builders: Jensen Marine/Cal Boats; O'Day Corp; George Crowell
- Role: Racer-Cruiser
- Name: Cal 39 (Hunt/O'Day)

Boat
- Displacement: 17,500 lb (7,938 kg)
- Draft: 7.00 ft (2.13 m)

Hull
- Type: Monohull
- Construction: Fiberglass
- LOA: 39.00 ft (11.89 m)
- LWL: 31.67 ft (9.65 m)
- Beam: 12.58 ft (3.83 m)
- Engine: Yanmar diesel engine

Hull appendages
- Keel: fin keel
- Ballast: 7,000 lb (3,175 kg)
- Rudder: spade-type rudder

Rig
- Rig type: Bermuda rig
- I foretriangle height: 52.50 ft (16.00 m)
- J foretriangle base: 15.25 ft (4.65 m)
- P mainsail luff: 46.66 ft (14.22 m)
- E mainsail foot: 15.00 ft (4.57 m)

Sails
- Sailplan: Masthead sloop
- Mainsail area: 349.95 sq ft (32.511 m^{2})
- Jib/genoa area: 400.31 sq ft (37.190 m^{2})
- Total sail area: 750.26 sq ft (69.701 m^{2})

The Cal 39 (Hunt/O'Day) is an American sailboat that was designed by C. Raymond Hunt and Associates as a racer-cruiser and first built in 1988.

The design was originally marketed by the manufacturer as the Cal 39, but is now usually referred to as the Cal 39 (Hunt/O'Day) to differentiate it from the earlier unrelated C. William Lapworth-designs: the 1970 Cal 39, the 1978 Cal 39 Mark II and 1983 Cal 39 Mark III, which were all marketed under the same Cal 39 name.

== Production ==
The design was built by Jensen Marine/Cal Boats and the O'Day Corp. in the United States, both divisions of the Bangor Punta conglomerate. In 2001 George Crowell bought the molds for the design and built a limited number of boats in Little Compton, Rhode Island.

== Design ==
The Cal 39 (Hunt/O'Day) is a recreational keelboat, built predominantly of fiberglass, with wooden trim. It has a masthead sloop rig, a raked stem, a reverse transom with a cut-out for a ladder and swimming platform, a spade-type rudder controlled by a wheel and a fixed fin keel. It displaces 17,500 lb (7,938 kg) and carries 7,000 lb (3,175 kg) of ballast.

The boat has a draft of 7.00 ft (2.13 m) with the standard keel and 5.33 ft (1.62 m) with the optional shoal draft wing keel.

The boat is fitted with a Japanese Yanmar diesel inboard engine for docking and maneuvering.

The design has sleeping accommodation for six people, with a bow cabin with a "V"-berth, a U-shaped dinette table berth and settee berth and an aft cabin on the starboard side, under the cockpit. The head is located on the port side at the foot of the companionway steps, opposite the galley. The gallery includes a three-burner stove, double sinks and an icebox.

== See also ==
- List of sailing boat types

Similar sailboats

- Baltic 40
- Cal 39
- Cal 39 Mark II
- Corbin 39
- Freedom 39
- Freedom 39 PH
- Islander 40
- Nautical 39
- Nordic 40
