= Bristol 39 =

Sailboat class

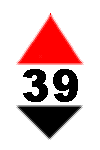
- Class symbol

Development
- Designer: Ted Hood
- Location: United States
- Year: 1966
- No. built: 58
- Builder: Bristol Yachts
- Role: Racer-Cruiser
- Name: Bristol 39

Boat
- Displacement: 17,580 lb (7,974 kg)
- Draft: 5.40 ft (1.65 m)

Hull
- Type: Monohull
- Construction: Fiberglass
- LOA: 39.00 ft (11.89 m)
- LWL: 27.54 ft (8.39 m)
- Beam: 10.75 ft (3.28 m)
- Engine: Perkins Engines 4-107 37 hp (28 kW) diesel engine

Hull appendages
- Keel: modified long keel
- Ballast: 6,500 lb (2,948 kg)
- Rudder: keel-mounted rudder

Rig
- Rig type: Bermuda rig
- I foretriangle height: 45.50 ft (13.87 m)
- J foretriangle base: 14.60 ft (4.45 m)
- P mainsail luff: 39.50 ft (12.04 m)
- E mainsail foot: 16.00 ft (4.88 m)

Sails
- Sailplan: Masthead sloop
- Mainsail area: 316.00 sq ft (29.357 m^{2})
- Jib/genoa area: 332.15 sq ft (30.858 m^{2})
- Total sail area: 648.15 sq ft (60.215 m^{2})

The Bristol 39 is an American sailboat that was designed by Ted Hood as a racer-cruiser and first built in 1966.

== Production ==
The Bristol 39 was produced 1966-1970 and was replaced in production by the Bristol 40, which was built from 1970–1986. Both are related designs, from the same hull molds. They have same the same principle dimensions, but have different lengths overall, 39.00 ft (11.89 m) versus 40.16 ft (12.24 m).

The Bristol 39 was built by Bristol Yachts in Bristol, Rhode Island, United States. The company produced 58 examples of the type, before production shifted to the Bristol 40.

== Design ==
The Bristol 39 is a recreational keelboat, built predominantly of fiberglass, with wood trim. It has a masthead sloop rig. It features a spooned raked stem, a raised counter reverse transom, a keel-mounted rudder controlled by a wheel and a fixed modified long keel, with a cutaway forefoot. A stub keel and centerboard was optional. It displaces 17,580 lb (7,974 kg) and carries 6,500 lb (2,948 kg) of lead ballast.

The boat has a draft of 5.40 ft (1.65 m) with the standard long keel, while the centreboard-equipped version has a draft of 7.8 ft (2.4 m) with the centreboard extended and 4.0 ft (1.2 m) with it retracted, allowing operation in shallow water.

The boat is fitted with a Perkins Engines 4-107 diesel engine for docking and maneuvering. The fuel tank holds 25 U.S. gallons (95 L; 21 imp gal) and the fresh water tank has a capacity of 130 U.S. gallons (490 L; 110 imp gal).

== Operational history ==
Bob Pingel, writing in Sailing Magazine in 2011 noted, "I recently conducted one of my cruising boat buyer's workshops and one of the attendees, Mark Mesone, was determined to buy a used Bristol 39 or 40 ... Mesone had concluded that the Bristol was the boat for him because it was beautiful, well built, large enough to live aboard with style, and when compared to more modern boats, quite affordable. He also loved the idea of owning a "classic." I couldn't find fault with any of his arguments."

== See also ==
- List of sailing boat types

Related development

- Bristol 40

Similar sailboats

- Baltic 40
- Endeavour 40
- Islander 40
- Nordic 40
