= Hunter 44 =

Sailboat class

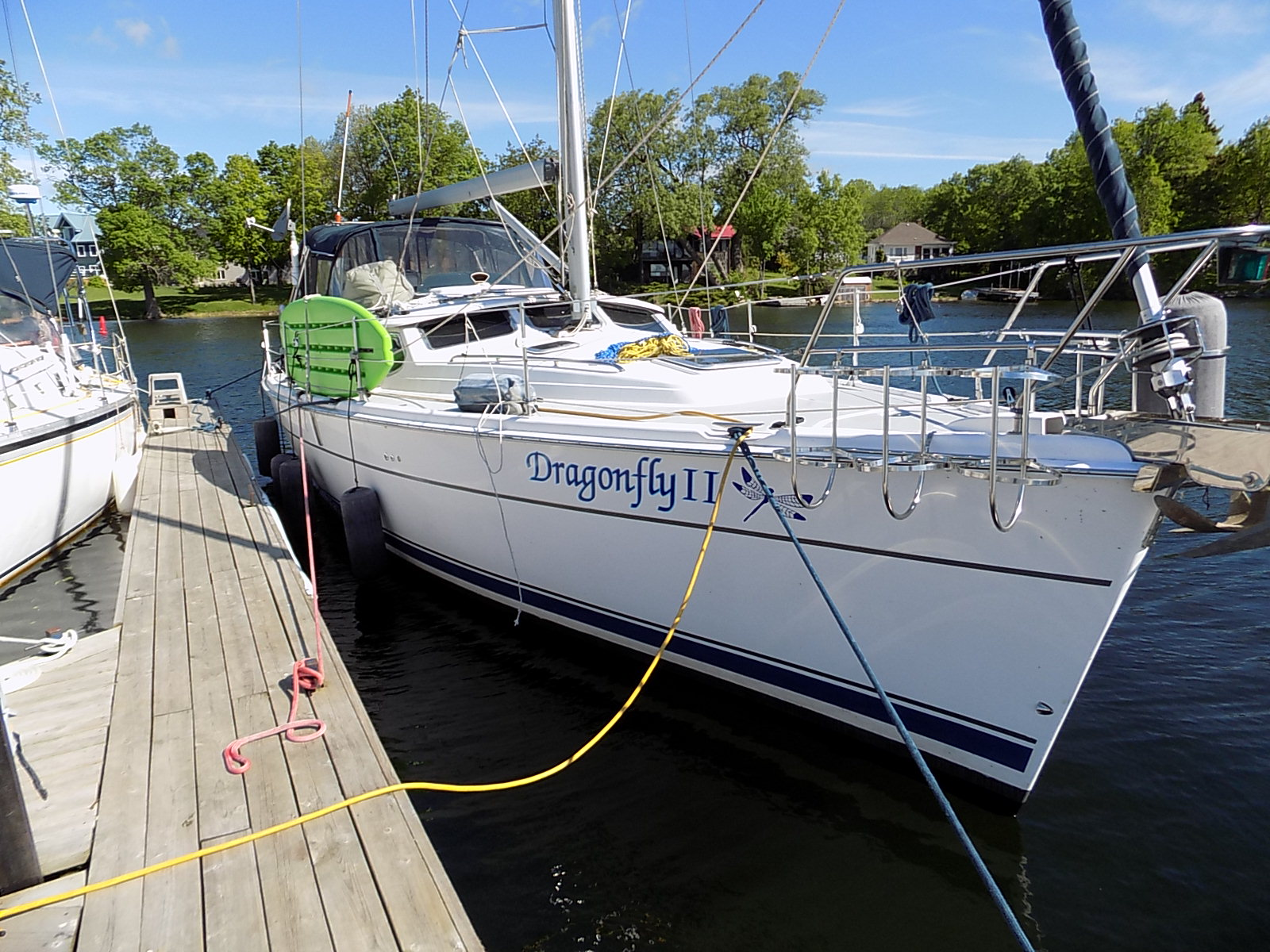

Development
- Designer: Glenn Henderson
- Location: United States
- Year: 2003
- No. built: 151
- Builder: Hunter Marine
- Name: Hunter 44

Boat
- Displacement: 22,936 lb (10,404 kg)
- Draft: 6.5 ft (2.0 m)

Hull
- Type: Monohull
- Construction: Fiberglass
- LOA: 43.3 ft (13.2 m)
- LWL: 39.1 ft (11.9 m)
- Beam: 14.6 ft (4.5 m)
- Engine: Yanmar 54 hp (40 kW) diesel engine

Hull appendages
- Keel: fin keel
- Ballast: 7,237 lb (3,283 kg)
- Rudder: internally-mounted spade-type/transom-mounted rudder

Rig
- General: Fractional rigged sloop
- Mast height: 50.7

Sails
- Total sail area: 975 sq ft (90.6 m^{2})

The Hunter 44, also called the Hunter 44 DS (Deck Salon), is an American sailboat, that was designed by Glenn Henderson and first built in 2003.

== Production ==
The boat was built by Hunter Marine in the United States from 2003 to 2008, but it is now out of production. A total of 151 examples were completed during its five-year production run.

== Design ==
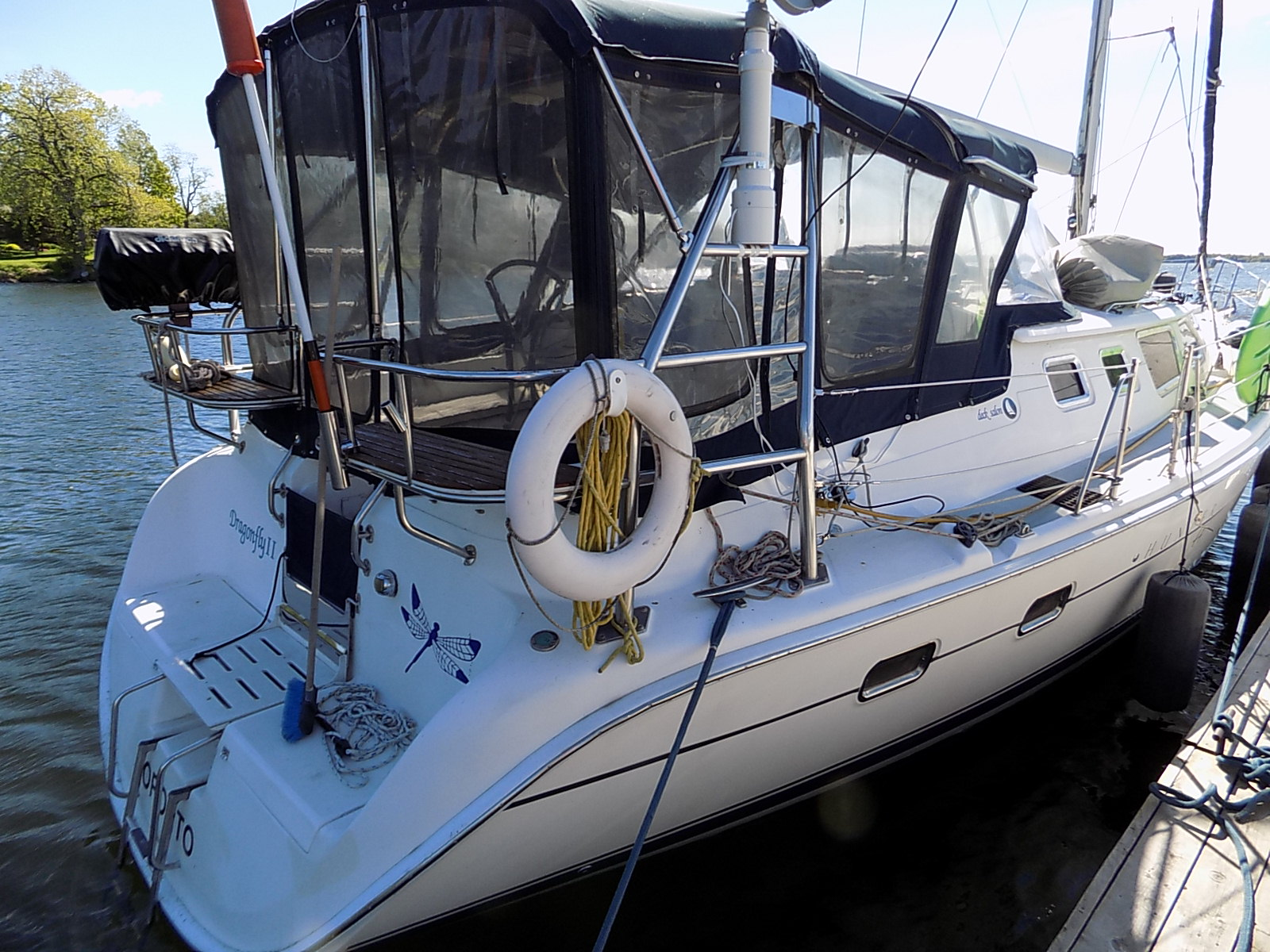
Hunter 44 stern view, showing transom details and enclosed cockpit with dodger and Bimini top combination

The Hunter 44 is a development of the 2002-introduced Hunter 426 DS, with a redesigned aft cabin. The Hunter 44 design was developed into the Hunter 45 DS in 2008 with the addition of twin helms, redesigned forward berth and new cabin windows.

The Hunter 44 shares the same hull design as the Hunter 426 DS, Hunter 45 DS, Hunter 44 AC (aft-cockpit) and the Hunter 45 CC (center cockpit).

The 44 is a small recreational keelboat, built predominantly of fiberglass, without any external wood trim. It has a fractional sloop B&R rig, an internally-mounted spade-type rudder and a fixed fin keel. With the longer keel it displaces 22,936 lb (10,404 kg) and carries 7,237 lb (3,283 kg) of ballast.

The boat has a draft of 6.5 ft (2.0 m) with the standard keel and 5.0 ft (1.5 m) with the optional shoal draft keel.

The boat is fitted with a Japanese Yanmar diesel engine of 54 hp (40 kW). The fuel tank holds 66 U.S. gallons (250 L; 55 imp gal) and the fresh water tank has a capacity of 140 U.S. gallons (530 L; 120 imp gal).

== See also ==
- List of sailing boat types

Similar sailboats

- C&C 44
- Corbin 39
- Gulfstar 43
- Nordic 44
