= Gulfstar Yachts =

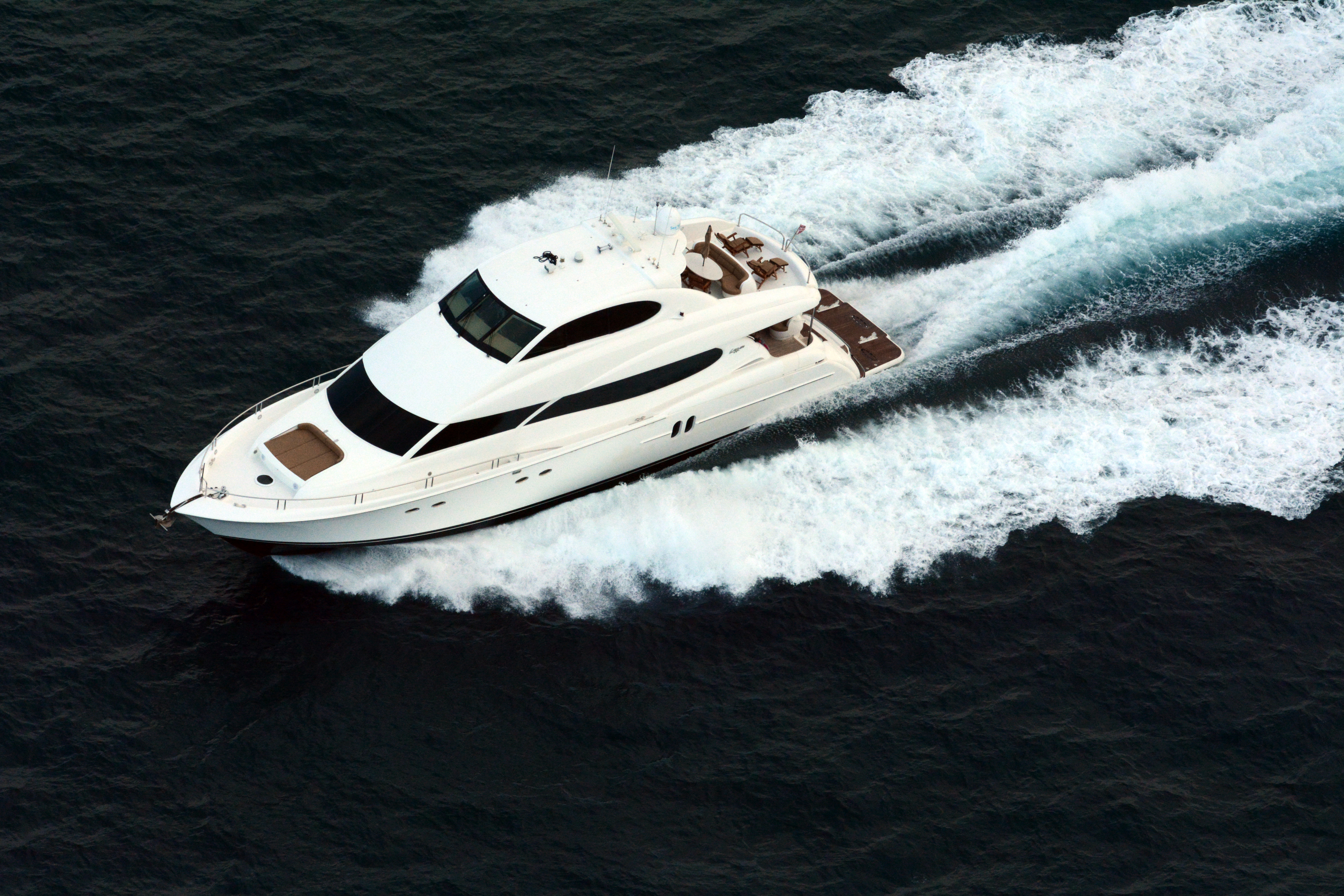
Lazzara 80 Sky Lounge enclosed bridge July, 2014

Gulfstar Yachts was a large manufacturer of fiberglass sailboats and powerboats built in the Tampa Bay, Florida area from 1970 until 1990 when the Viking Yachts purchased the company's assets. Vince Lazzara, one of pioneers of fiberglass sailboat construction, founded the company. Lazzara had previously been one of the founders of Columbia Yachts. They produced both power from 36 to 72 feet and sailboats from 36 to 63.

Gulfstar 50 Sloop

== History ==
Gulfstar Yachts Logo

In 1970, Vince Lazzara emerged from a two-year non-compete clause, which had prevented his building fiberglass monohull power and sailboats. He had signed this clause when he sold his share in Columbia Yachts and had been biding his time by building houseboats. Immediately after the non-compete clause expired, Lazzara founded Gulfstar Yachts in the Tampa Bay area. He began building low-priced, low-quality, beamy boats. The hulls were even interchangeable as sailboats or trawlers, which minimized production costs. In the mid-1970s, Gulfstar was losing market share. Lazzara, not wanting to leave a legacy as a producer of poor quality yachts reorganized the company, contracted Ted Hood for a number of models and began to produce high-quality, performance yachts also updating and expanding its Sailmaster series. In 1984, Gulfstar began producing the Sailcruiser twin engine motorsailor series, producing yachts rivaling that of the best production yachts of the late 70s and mid 80s The early and mid 80's are now considered Gulfstar's 'Golden Era' of yacht production. By the mid-1980s, as sons Richard and Brad (powerboat fans) became more involved in Gulfstar, their production shifted towards powerboats and away from the performance sailboats. During the mid-1980s, Gulfstar also produced a number of performance sailing yachts for the CSY charter boat fleet in the Caribbean.

In 1986, Gulfstar and Viking Yachts, a powerboat manufacturer, started talking about a merger. In 1990, Viking purchased Gulfstar's assets.

== Sail ==
Model	Designer	Notes
61MS	Lazzara	motorsailor
60AUX	R.C. Lazzara	performance auxiliary sailboat
54SC	Lazzara	sailcruiser
53MS	Lazzara	motorsailor
52IND	Lazzara	52 Independence
50AUX	Vince Lazzara	performance sailboat, comes in Mark II version, sloop/ketch, and two/three staterooms
48HOOD	Ted Hood	performance sailboat
47SM	Vince Lazzara	sailmaster motorsailor
45Hirsh	R.C. Lazzara	sailcruiser, performance auxiliary (built by Hirsh using purchased Gulfstar 44 plans)
44AUX	R.C. Lazzara	performance sailboat, comes in Mark I, II versions
Gulfstar 43	Vince Lazzara	comes in Mark I, II versions
41AUX	Vince Lazzara	performance sailboat, start of sailing tradition in 1973
40HOOD	Ted Hood	performance sailboat
50SM	Vince Lazzara	Sailmaster - performance motorsailor
40SM	R.C. Lazzara	Sailmaster center cockpit—performance motorsailor, 1981–82, same hull as 39SM, 12 hulls, primarily for the bareboat charter company, Moorings.
39SM	R.C. Lazzara	Sailmaster - performance motorsailor, 1981–82, 60 hulls.
36AUX	Vince Lazzara	aft cockpit from 1984
36MS	Vince Lazzara	motorsailor

== Power ==
Model	Designer	Notes
GS72	Lazzara	motoryacht 1987-90 6 hulls
GS65	Lazzara	motoryacht, extended aft deck 1987-91 6 hulls
GS63MY	Lazzara	motoryacht, 1987-90 28 hulls
GS57	Lazzara	motoryacht 1990 3 hulls
GS55MY	Lazzara	Viking 55 motoryacht, 1987-90 35 hulls
GS53TRW	Lazzara	trawler, same hull as 53MS, 10 hulls from 1975-1976
GS49MY	Lazzara	motoryacht, late 1980s, Mark I and II versions
GS48MY	Lazzara	motoryacht, 1981-82 23 hulls
GS44MY	Vince Lazzara	motoryacht, Mrk I 1985 Mrk II 1986 Mrk III 1987 Mrk IV 1988
GS44MC	Lazzara	motor cruiser 1975-80 90 hulls
GS43TRW	Vince Lazzara	trawler, Mrk I 1973-74 Mrk II 1975-77
GS38MC	Vince Lazzara	motor cruiser, 1980-84 30 hulls
GS36TRW	Vince Lazzara	trawler, Mrk I 1972-73 Mrk II (98) 1975-76 (35)same hull as MS36

== See also ==
- List of sailboat designers and manufacturers
- List of boat builders
