= Corbin 39 =

Sailboat class

Development
- Designer: Robert Dufour and Marius Corbin
- Location: Canada
- Year: 1979
- No. built: 200
- Builder: Corbin Les Bateaux
- Role: Cruiser
- Name: Corbin 39

Boat
- Displacement: 22,800 lb (10,342 kg)
- Draft: 5.50 ft (1.68 m)

Hull
- Type: Monohull
- Construction: Fibreglass
- LOA: 41.50 ft (12.65 m)
- LWL: 32.00 ft (9.75 m)
- Beam: 12.08 ft (3.68 m)
- Engine: Westerbeke 33 hp (25 kW) diesel engine

Hull appendages
- Keel: fin keel
- Ballast: 9,000 lb (4,082 kg)
- Rudder: skeg-mounted rudder

Rig
- Rig type: Bermuda rig
- I foretriangle height: 48.50 ft (14.78 m)
- J foretriangle base: 18.30 ft (5.58 m)
- P mainsail luff: 42.00 ft (12.80 m)
- E mainsail foot: 17.50 ft (5.33 m)

Sails
- Sailplan: Cutter rig
- Mainsail area: 367.50 sq ft (34.142 m^{2})
- Jib/genoa area: 443.78 sq ft (41.229 m^{2})
- Total sail area: 811.28 sq ft (75.370 m^{2})

Racing
- PHRF: 156

The Corbin 39 is a Canadian sailboat that was designed by Robert Dufour and Marius Corbin as a global circumnavigation cruiser and first built in 1979.

The design was based upon a one-off boat that Dufour had built, named Harmonie.

Yacht broker Richard Jordan noted, "the quality reputation of Corbin, and Dufour’s design gives them a cult-like status."

== Production ==
The design was built by Corbin Les Bateaux of Chateauguay, Quebec, Canada, with boats produced in Chateauguay, Napierville and Saint-Paul-de-l'Île-aux-Noix, Quebec. The company built 200 examples of the type between 1979 and 1986, but it is now out of production. Of those built, 185 of the boats were sold unfinished or as kits, for owner completion. The balance, 15 boats, were factory-completed demonstrators, all with different interiors.

A fire at the factory in 1982 resulted in the destruction of the aft cockpit model's deck moulds after boat serial number 129 had been built, so new ones were made with a larger cockpit and higher cabin trunk. A pilothouse was also added to the centre-cockpit model at the same time. The mast was also moved 2.5 ft (76 cm) forward.

== Design ==
The Corbin 39 is a recreational keelboat, built predominantly of fibreglass with either solid fibreglass construction or an optional Airex core and with wooden trim. It has a cutter rig or optional ketch rig with aluminum spars, an aft or centre cockpit, a raked stem, a rounded transom, a skeg-mounted rudder controlled by a wheel and a fixed fin keel. A tall rig was also produced.

The boat has a draft of 5.50 ft (1.68 m) with the standard keel fitted.

The boat is fitted with a Volkswagen Pathfinder or Westerbeke diesel engine of 33 hp (25 kW) or BMW D-35 of 35 hp (26 kW) for docking and manoeuvring. The fuel tank holds 104 U.S. gallons (390 L; 87 imp gal) and the fresh water tank has a capacity of 128 U.S. gallons (480 L; 107 imp gal).

The kit boats were produced at four levels of completion:

- Choice one: bare hull and deck
- Choice two: hull and deck, with six structural bulkheads and ballast
- Choice three ("motor-away"): same as two, but with engine and tanks installed
- Choice four ("sail-away"): same as three, but with mast and sails

Because most boats were owner-completed, interior layouts and rigs vary greatly. A typical layout includes up to seven berths although many boats were equipped for long-term living aboard by a couple. Berths can include an aft double stateroom with its own wash basin, main cabin settee berths and a bow cabin with a double berth to starboard and a settee to port. The galley is located on the port side and includes a three burner stove and an oven. There is a sink with a pressurized water supply. The navigation station is opposite the galley on the starboard side. The head is located aft of the bow cabin on the starboard side and includes a shower.

Ventilation is typically provided by two hatches above the galley, two hatches in the main cabin and one in the bow cabin, plus six dorade vents.

Typically teak trim is used on deck. There is a bow anchor locker, two mast-mounted halyard winches, two cockpit-mounted genoa winches, genoa tracks, a mainsheet traveller and running backstays.

The design has a PHRF racing average handicap of 156.

== Variants ==
Corbin 39
This aft-cockpit model has pilothouse, a length overall of 41.50 ft (12.6 m) including the bowsprit, a waterline length of 32.00 ft (9.8 m), displaces 22,800 lb (10,342 kg) and carries 9,000 lb (4,082 kg) of ballast. It is designed with a particularly small cockpit suited for two people and to reduce the risk of swamping.
Corbin 39 CC
This centre-cockpit with an optional staysail, has a length overall of 38.75 ft (11.8 m), a waterline length of 31.92 ft (9.7 m), displaces 22,800 lb (10,342 kg) and carries 9,200 lb (4,173 kg) of ballast.

== Operational history ==
In a review Michael McGoldrick wrote, "the Corbin 39 was the result of an effort to design the ideal boat for serious bluewater cruising. It probably came very close to being exactly that. More so than with most other sailboats, you find the Corbin in the hands of people who have made extensive bluewater passages (or were at least planning on doing so)."

In a 1994 review Richard Sherwood wrote, "the Corbin may be purchased in various stages of completion. Rig may be ketch or cutter, and the cockpit may be aft or amidships for either, although the mizzen will go through the aft cockpit of a ketch. Corbin is pleased that their boat has been termed "overbuilt," as they intend it for cruising."

A 2010 review by yacht broker Richard Jordan indicated, "the work Corbin did do was exceptional. The hulls have an impressive layup schedule of 11 layers of mat and roving with a 16mm Airex core. The deck is a 3/4″ core of marine grade mahogany early on but later Airex foam. The ballast is 9,000 pounds lead encapsulated with extra layers of fiberglass around the keel for protection. Most spars are by Everett Bastet of E.B. Spars Inc. in Quebec. Early one this was a 46′ single spreader main or a 51′ turbo charged double spreader. Later on most had 49′ double spreader rigs. All rigs are deck stepped which may surprise traditionalists. If done right, a deck stepped rig is just as secure as a keel stepped one, and every indication shows that Corbin knew how to engineer a seaworthy sailboat."

A 2011 review in Blue Water Boats, concluded, "Corbins with their fin keel and skeg rudder combination are better sailing than their 26,000 pounds displacement might suggest. They are meant as Marius Corbin writes to take someone, “safely and comfortably around the world…We get postcards from all over the world…what better recommendation is there for a strong and seaworthy vessel.” The cutter rig with a reefed main is a safe and seaworthy combination."

== See also ==
- List of sailing boat types

Similar sailboats

- Baltic 40
- Cal 39
- Cal 39 Mark II
- Cal 39 (Hunt/O'Day)
- Freedom 39
- Freedom 39 PH
- Hunter 44
- Hunter 410
- Islander 40
- Nautical 39
- Nordic 40
