= Sheet (sailing) =

One of the lines on a sail ship

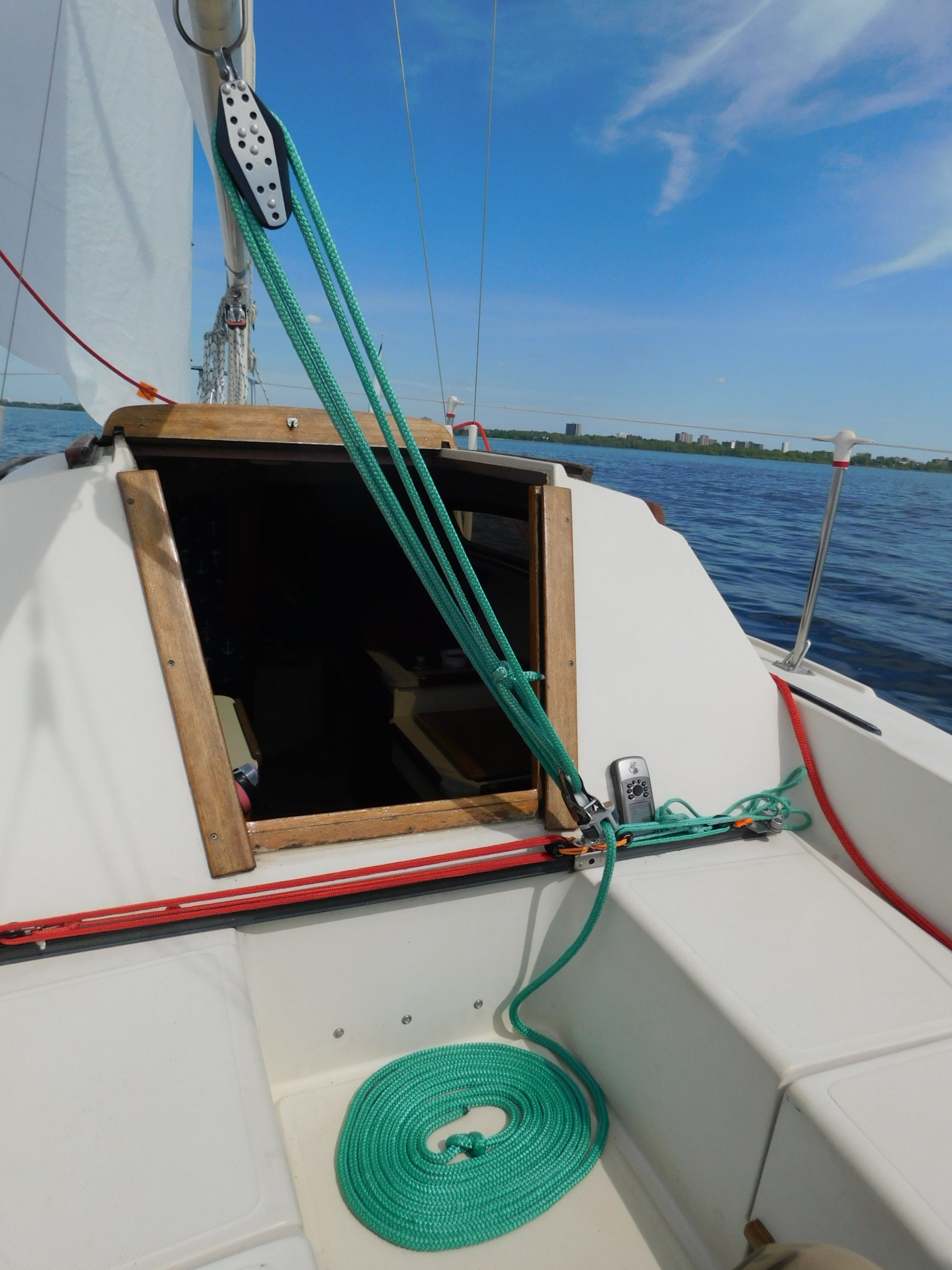
The mainsheet (large green line) on a US Yachts US 22 sailboat

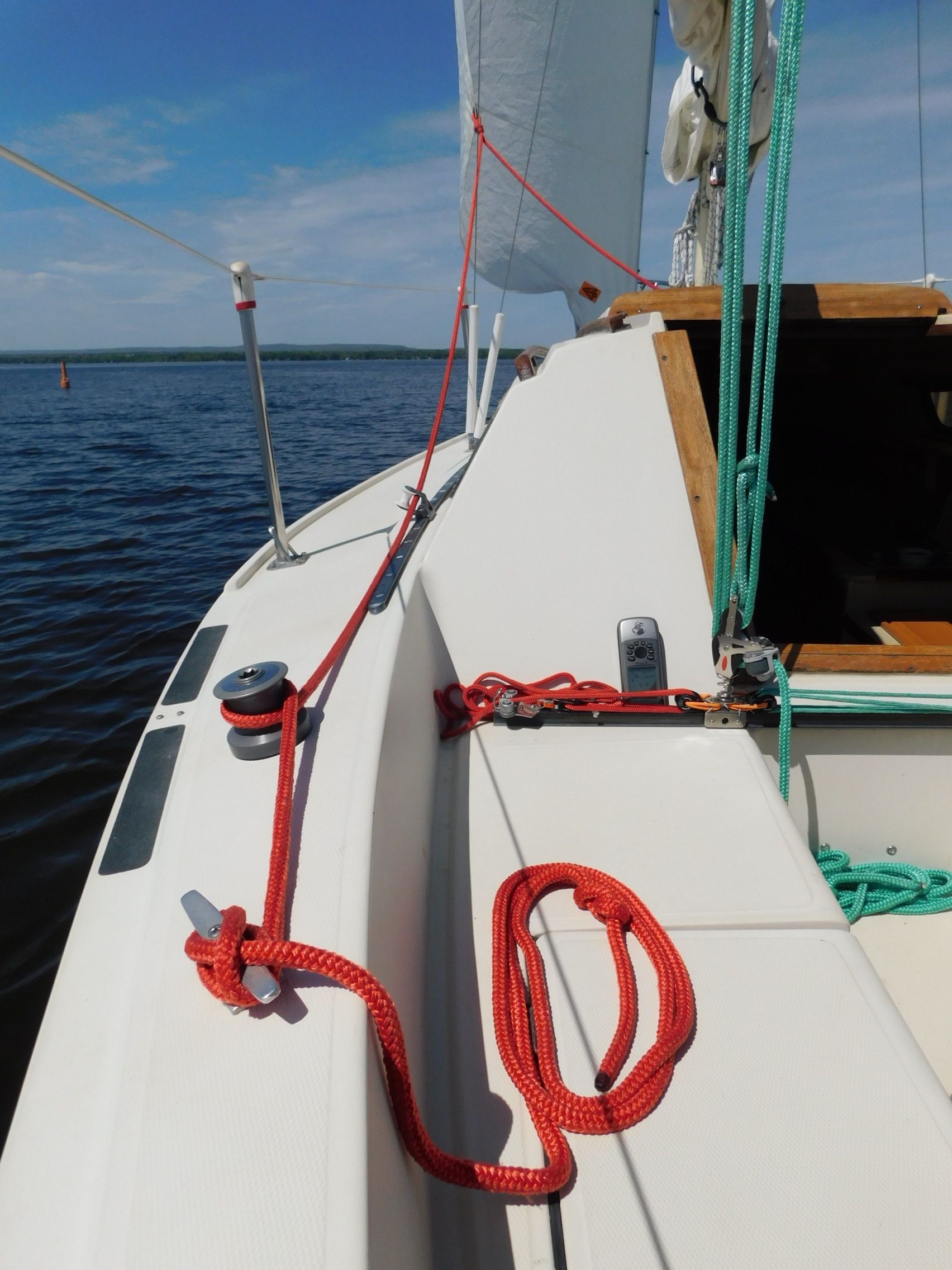
The jib sheet (large red line) on a US Yachts US 22 sailboat

In sailing, a sheet is a line (rope, cable or chain) used to control the movable corner(s) (clews) of a sail.

== Terminology ==
In nautical usage the term "sheet" is applied to a line or chain attached to the lower corners of a sail for the purpose of extension or change of direction. The connection in derivation with the root "shoot" is more clearly seen in "sheet-anchor", one that is kept in reserve, to be "shot" in case of emergency.

== Fore-and-aft rigs ==
Fore-and-aft rigs comprise the vast majority of sailing vessels in use today, including effectively all dinghies and yachts. The sheet on a fore-and-aft sail controls the angle of the sail to the wind, and should be adjusted to keep the sail just filled. Most smaller boats use the Bermuda rig, which has two or three sets of sheets:

- The mainsheet is attached to the boom, and is used to control the mainsail. In a rig with no boom on the mainsail, the mainsheet would attach directly to the mainsail clew. A mainsheet is a line connected to the boom which allows a sailor to control the speed of a boat.
- The jib sheet attaches to the clew of the jib, and controls it. The jib has a sheet on each side, only one of which (the leeward one) will be in use at one time.
- The spinnaker sheet attaches to the clew(s) of the spinnaker, if carried. A symmetrical spinnaker has two sheets, an "active" one and a "lazy" one, in the same way as a jib, but they are attached to the sail's two separate clews. On boats larger than around thirty feet, the spinnaker will also be fitted with guys, which are similar to sheets but control the pole instead of the sail. On smaller boats the lazy sheet is used as a guy.

On the smallest boats, a sheet is often a simple line, pulled by hand; on larger boats, intermediate blocks are sometimes used to provide mechanical advantage. However, many blocks and their multiply reeved lines, particularly on headsails, have been replaced by single-line sheets trimmed by powerful winches.

== Square rig ==
Square-rigged vessels are much less common, and are usually large ships. Nevertheless, they too have sheets on the movable corners of their square sails. Unlike fore-and-aft sheets, though, square-rig sheets do not control the angle of the sails (which is performed using braces); instead, they are used to haul the corners of the sails from their stowed positions down towards the tip of the yard below. They are then not adjusted significantly while sailing until the sail is to be handed (put away) again. The lowest sails, the courses, are trimmed using the sheets as these sails are loose footed and are secured to yards only at the head.

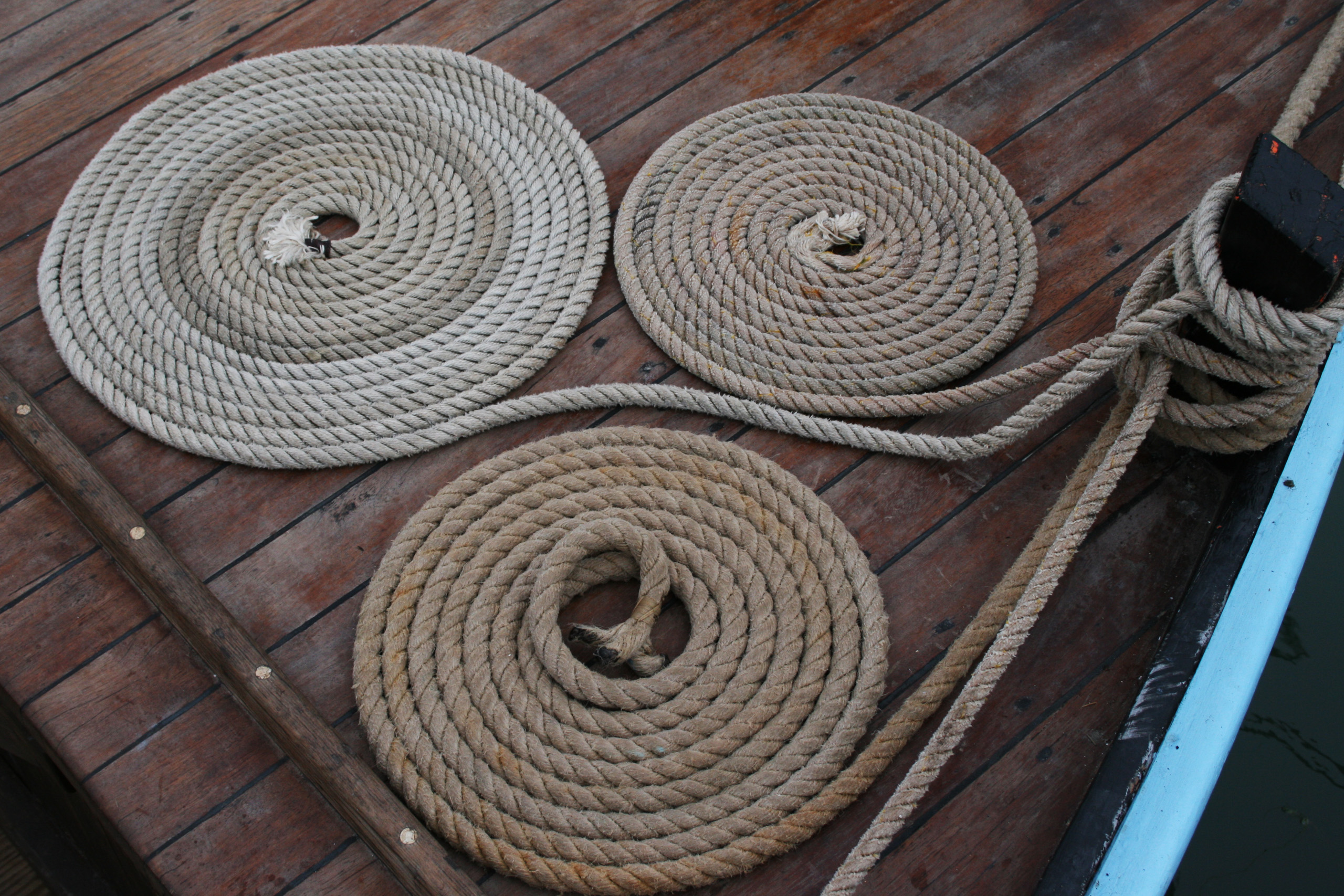
Flemish flaked sheets

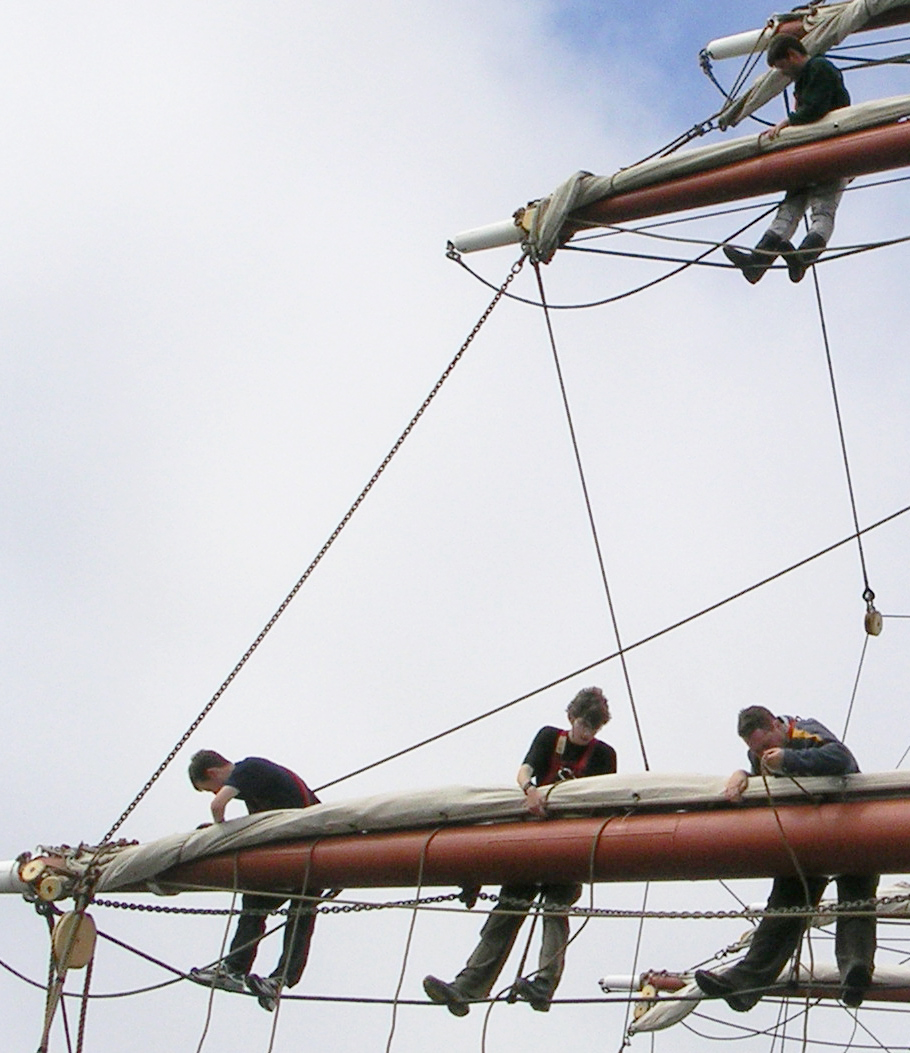
The length of chain running diagonally up and right from the bottom-left of this picture to the upper of the two yards is the fore-lower-topsail sheet. Some of the lines on Prince William's larger sails are made of chain to handle the heavy loads while remaining flexible enough to pass through the various blocks on their route to the deck.
