= Bristol Yachts =

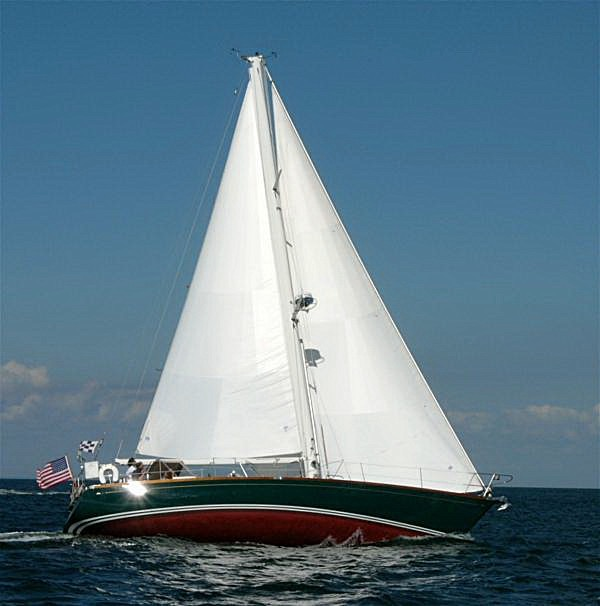
Bristol under full sail

Bristol Yachts was an American company which was among the first commercially successful production fiberglass sailboat boat builders. The company was founded in 1964 and closed in 1997.

== History ==
Bristol Yacht Company was founded by Clinton Pearson. Clint and his cousin Everett Pearson began building fiberglass dinghies in 1955 in their garage on County Street in Seekonk, Massachusetts, just over the Massachusetts/Rhode Island state border. Within a year the newly founded Pearson Yachts employed hundreds of people. Fast corporate expansion resulted in cash flow problems, so the cousins raised capital by selling equity in Pearson to Grumman Allied Industries in 1961. Clinton left in 1964 and bought out a troubled sailboat-maker, Sailstar, in West Warwick, Rhode Island, and moved into the abandoned Herreshoff boatyard. Carl Alberg designed the company's first boat, the Bristol 27. Clinton changed the company’s name to Bristol Yacht Company in 1966, and the Sailstar brand was phased out. The boat yard was eventually located on Popasquash Road, in Bristol, Rhode Island. The facilities included a giant barn on land owned by Clinton and where his home was located as well. Across the road from the barn was a small marina and travellift. The company closed due to bankruptcy in 1997.

== Models and designers ==
Early Bristol models aimed at the mass market and often were cutaway full keel or keel-centerboard designs. Among the first models were the Alberg designed 27 and the Herreshoff designed 29. Halsey Herreshoff, the grandson of the brilliant yacht designer and innovator Nathanael Herreshoff and a renowned yacht designer in his own right, designed a number of first generation models, including the Bristol Caravel 22, the 26 "Courier", 28, 29, 30, 33 and 34. His early designs made the most of the CCA rules with cutaway keels and long overhangs. His later designs were generally performance oriented fin and skeg or fin keel designs. Carl Alberg was responsible for the first generation Bristol models Corinthian 19 (one of the original Sailstar models that Bristol took over) and the Bristol 27 (a boat very similar in design to the Pearson Triton 28, also an Alberg design). Paul Coble designed the Corsair (another Sailstar model later identified as the Bristol 24)--a very stout and roomy 24 footer. The Bristol 32 and 39 (40) were designed by Ted Hood.

Early Bristols offered a lot for their modest prices, including encapsulated lead keels on many models, but with iron punchings and concrete on many of the boats that joined the Bristol line when Bristol acquired the molds from Sailstar. The boats features large galleys for their day, large cockpits with seats you could sleep on, fiberglass cabin headliners on some models, and interiors with a nice blend of white formica and mahogany trim. The early boats had keel-hung rudders, cut away full keels and were moderately stout boats with a relatively comfortable motion for their day. The second generation Bristol yachts carried a decimal and a repeat of the second model number (27.7, 29.9, 31.1, 33.3, 35.5, 38.8, 41.1, 43.3, 45.5, 47.7, 51.1). They came from the design team of Ted Hood, an America's Cup designer. Hood designs generally were centerboard boats which aimed for performance without deep draft, although some models offered the option of a deeper fixed keel. The hull designs were a development of Ted Hood's "whale bottom" delta hull form, with a steep deadrise allowing the ballast to be placed low in the hull (compensating for the lack of ballast in the centreboard), and improving interior space. This hull design is known for its comfortable motion in a seaway. Several of the second generation boats were designed by Dieter Empacher, who, at the time, was employed by Hood design group.

Later on, numerous options were available making the boats essentially semi-custom. For example, in 1985 the options list included a choice of interior wood, counter material, cabin floor, exterior rubbing rails, higher/deeper toe rails, teak swim ladder, a choice of engines, instrumentation options, and so on. Bristols were typically built more heavily than many comparable production sailboats, with features such as skeg-hung rudders, keel-stepped masts, fully encapsulated keel ballast, interior cabinetry bonded to the hull for strength, heavy-duty bronze seacocks, and heavy fibreglass lay-up. Most Bristols can be raced using the PHRF handicap system, despite being designed more for cruising and comfort.

The company built, or at least advertised, two models of motor yacht, one designated the 42 foot Bristol Offshore Trawler and the other advertised as a 38 foot model available in both an aft cabin and sedan configuration. Bristol trawlers were sold during the late 1960s through the early 1980s. Bristol Yacht Co. laid up the hull for the early 42 foot model which was a round-bilge design by the famed Eldridge-McGinnis naval architecture firm. The 42 foot model displaced somewhere between 26 and 30,000 pounds. The hulls were shipped off to another builder for epoxy laminated plywood decks and interiors. Production of the Bristol trawlers shifted to India during the 1970s. Numerous Bristol 42 trawlers remain in service as of November 2011.

The company began building custom designed sailboats in the 50-plus foot range in the early 1990s but eventually folded in 1997. The yard built more than 4400 boats, the largest being 72' long.

== Boats ==
Boats built by Bristol Yachts:

- Alerion 38
- Bristol Caravel 22
- Bristol Corsair 24
- Bristol 19
- Bristol 24
- Bristol 26
- Bristol 27
- Bristol 27 Weekender
- Bristol 27-2
- Bristol 27.7
- Bristol 28
- Bristol 29
- Bristol 29.9
- Bristol 30
- Bristol 31 XL
- Bristol 31.1
- Bristol 32
- Bristol 33
- Bristol 33.3
- Bristol 34
- Bristol 35
- Bristol 35.5
- Bristol 38.8
- Bristol 39
- Bristol 40
- Bristol 41.1
- Bristol 43.3
- Bristol 43/44
- Bristol 45.5
- Bristol 45.5 CC
- Bristol 47.7
- Bristol 48.8
- Bristol 51
- Bristol 51.1
- Bristol 54.4
- Bristol 56.6
- Bristol 3800
- Corinthian 19
- Hadley 27

== See also ==
- List of sailboat designers and manufacturers
- APc-1-class small coastal transports
