= Starwind 22 =

1980s American trailer sailer

Development
- Designer: Halsey Herreshoff
- Location: United States
- Year: 1982
- Builders: Chrysler Marine; Starwind
- Role: Cruiser
- Name: Starwind 22

Boat
- Displacement: 2,600 lb (1,179 kg)
- Draft: 4.50 ft (1.37 m) with centerboard down

Hull
- Type: monohull
- Construction: fiberglass
- LOA: 22.00 ft (6.71 m)
- LWL: 19.00 ft (5.79 m)
- Beam: 7.75 ft (2.36 m)
- Engine: outboard motor

Hull appendages
- Keel: centerboard
- Ballast: 775 lb (352 kg)
- Rudder: transom-mounted rudder

Rig
- Rig type: Bermuda rig
- I foretriangle height: 23.50 ft (7.16 m)
- J foretriangle base: 8.50 ft (2.59 m)
- P mainsail luff: 24.00 ft (7.32 m)
- E mainsail foot: 9.00 ft (2.74 m)

Sails
- Sailplan: fractional rigged sloop
- Mainsail area: 99.88 sq ft (9.279 m^{2})
- Jib/genoa area: 108.00 sq ft (10.034 m^{2})
- Total sail area: 207.88 sq ft (19.313 m^{2})

Racing
- PHRF: 273

The Starwind 22 is an American trailerable sailboat that was designed by Halsey Herreshoff as a cruiser and first built in 1982.

== Production ==
The design was built by Starwind, from 1982 to 1984 and also by Chrysler Marine in the United States, but it is now out of production. It was replaced in production by the Starwind 223.

== Design ==
The Starwind 22 is a recreational sailboat, built predominantly of fiberglass, with wood trim. It has a fractional sloop or optional masthead sloop rig, a raked stem, a reverse transom, a transom-hung rudder controlled by a tiller and a retractable centerboard. It displaces 2,600 lb (1,179 kg) and carries 775 lb (352 kg) of ballast. of flooding water ballast. The ballast is drained for road transport.

The boat has a draft of 4.50 ft (1.37 m) with the centerboard extended and 1.90 ft (0.58 m) with it retracted, allowing operation in shallow water or ground transportation on a trailer.

The boat is normally fitted with a small 3 to 6 hp (2 to 4 kW) outboard motor for docking and maneuvering.

The design has sleeping accommodation for five people, with a double "V"-berth in the bow cabin, a straight settee and a drop-down dinette table that forms a double berth in the main cabin. The galley is located on the starboard side just aft of the bow cabin. The galley is equipped with a two-burner stove and a sink. The head is located in the bow cabin on the starboard side. Cabin headroom is 57 in (145 cm).

The design has a PHRF racing average handicap of 273 and a hull speed of 5.8 kn (10.7 km/h).
