= Chrysler 22 =

Sailboat class

Development
- Designer: Halsey Herreshoff
- Location: United States
- Year: 1975
- Builder: Chrysler Marine

Boat
- Displacement: 3,000 lb (1,361 kg)
- Draft: 4.92 ft (1.50 m) with swing keel down

Hull
- Type: monohull
- Construction: fiberglass
- LOA: 21.58 ft (6.58 m)
- LWL: 19.00 ft (5.79 m)
- Beam: 7.75 ft (2.36 m)
- Engine: outboard motor

Hull appendages
- Keel: swing keel
- Rudder: pivoting internally-mounted spade-type rudder

Rig
- Rig type: Bermuda rig
- I foretriangle height: 27.50 ft (8.38 m)
- J foretriangle base: 8.80 ft (2.68 m)
- P mainsail luff: 23.30 ft (7.10 m)
- E mainsail foot: 7.60 ft (2.32 m)

Sails
- Sailplan: masthead sloop
- Mainsail area: 88.54 sq ft (8.226 m^{2})
- Jib/genoa area: 121.00 sq ft (11.241 m^{2})
- Total sail area: 209.54 sq ft (19.467 m^{2})

Racing
- PHRF: 270

The Chrysler 22 is an American trailerable sailboat that was designed by Halsey Herreshoff and first built in 1975.

== Production ==
The design was built by Chrysler Marine in Plano, Texas, United States, from 1975 to 1978, but it is now out of production.

== Design ==
The Chrysler 22 is a recreational keelboat, built predominantly of fiberglass, with wood trim. It has a masthead sloop rig, a raked stem, a slightly reverse transom, a pivoting internally mounted spade-type rudder controlled by a tiller and a fixed fin keel or swing keel. It displaces 3,000 lb (1,361 kg). The fixed keel model carries 725 lb (329 kg) of ballast. A tall mast was also available with a mast 1.50 ft (0.46 m) higher than standard

The keel-equipped version of the boat has a draft of 4.92 ft (1.50 m), while the swing keel-equipped version has a draft of 4.92 ft (1.50 m) with the keel extended and 3.92 ft (1.19 m) with it retracted, allowing operations in shallow water or ground transportation on a trailer.

The boat is normally fitted with a small 3 to 6 hp (2 to 4 kW) outboard motor for docking and maneuvering.

The design has sleeping accommodation for five people, with a double "V"-berth in the bow cabin, a straight settee berth on the starboard side of the main cabin along with a dinette table that can be lowered to provide a double berth on the port side. The optional head is a portable-type and is located under the bow cabin "V"-berth, on the port side. Cabin headroom is 52 in (130 cm).

For ventilation the design is equipped with a large foredeck hatch.

The design has a PHRF racing average handicap of 270 and a hull speed of 5.8 kn (10.7 km/h).

== Operational history ==
The boat is supported by two active class clubs that organize racing events, the Chrysler Sailing Association and the Chrysler Sailors.

In a 2010 review Steve Henkel wrote, "...the manufacturer called this a 22-foot boat (although in a few places we've seen 21' 7" as the LOA) with a 19-foot waterline. Just by glancing at the drawings, one can see that the LOD is only a little longer than the waterline length. We measured LOD on the drawing and got 21 2", so we're calling the boat by the length most marketers would: a 21-footer ... Best features: We noticed no special features worth mentioning. Worst features: The inboard pivoting rudder has the same problems as described for the Chrysler 20 ... a similar design. Headroom is lowest, among the comp[etition]."

In a 1995 review in Practical Sailor, writer Darrell Nicholson stated, "the Chrysler 22 is still much admired for its clean lines and good looks. The option list, as with many small boats of its day, was long: pulpits and lifelines, galley and water tank, portable cooler, outboard bracket, toilet, curtains, backstay adjuster, running lights, mainsail cover, cushions, boom vang and more. Presumably, most used boats on the market today have these 'accessories.'"

== See also ==
- List of sailing boat types
