= Corinthian F.C. (disambiguation) =

Corinthian F.C. and similar can mean:

- Corinthian F.C., in London from 1882 to 1939
- Sport Club Corinthians Paulista, in São Paulo, Brazil
- Corinthians F.C. (Isle of Man)
- Corinthian F.C. (Kent)
- Corinthians F.C. (Johannesburg)

== See also ==
- Corinthian-Casuals F.C. – an amateur club from London, successor to Corinthian F.C.
- Cardiff Corinthians F.C.
- Galway Corinthians RFC
- Corinthian (disambiguation)
