= Corinthian =

Corinthian or Corinthians may refer to:

- Several Pauline epistles, books of the New Testament of the Bible:
  - First Epistle to the Corinthians
  - Second Epistle to the Corinthians
  - Third Epistle to the Corinthians (Orthodox)
- A demonym relating to the city-state of Ancient Corinth
- A demonym relating to the modern-day port of Corinth or the regional unit of Corinthia in Greece
- Corinthian order, a classical order of ancient Greek and Roman architecture
- Residents or people from the town of Corinth, New York
- The League of Corinth, a federation of ancient Greek states
- Corinthian Colleges, a post secondary education company in North America currently under criminal investigation in the US.
- Corinthian (comics), a character in The Sandman comics
- The Corinthian (novel), novel by Georgette Heyer
- The Corinthian (Manhattan), a skyscraper in New York City
- The Corinthian helmet, a style of helmet worn by hoplites in classical Greece
- Corinthian leather, a marketing term used by Chrysler
- Corinthian (horse), American racehorse, a 2007 Breeders' Cup winner
- Corinthian bagatelle, occasionally called Corinthians
- Orient Express Corinthian (or OE Corinthian) a SolidSail sailing cruise ship built by Chantiers de l'Atlantique in 2026

== Sports ==
- Amateur sport; in particular
  - Victorian ideal of the gentleman amateur
  - Corinthian, amateur yachter
- Corinthian Yacht Club (disambiguation), several yacht clubs with this name
- Sport Club Corinthians Paulista, Brazilian professional football club
- Corinthian F.C., a former English amateur football club
- Corinthian-Casuals F.C., English football club formed by Corinthian F.C. and Casuals F.C.
- Corinthian F.C. (Kent), another former English football club, which attempted to emulate the ideals of the Corinthians
- Cardiff Corinthians F.C., Welsh football club
- Corinthians USA, a professional football club based in Fontana, California
- Sport Club Corinthians Alagoano, a professional football club in Brazil named after the other Brazilian club
- Atlético Clube Coríntians, a professional football club in Brazil
- Sport Club Corinthians Paranaense, a former professional football club in Brazil, dissolved in 2017
- Esporte Clube Corinthians, a professional football club in Brazil
- Esporte Clube Corinthians de Bataguassu, a professional football club in Brazil
- Seawanhaka Corinthian Yacht Club, a yacht club located in Oyster Bay, New York.
- Corinthians A.F.C. (Isle of Man), a Manx football club
- Galway Corinthians RFC, an Irish rugby club
