= Bristol Corsair 24 =

Sailboat class

Development
- Designer: Paul Coble
- Location: United States
- Year: 1964
- No. built: 750
- Builders: Sailstar Boat Company; Bristol Yachts
- Role: Cruiser
- Name: Bristol Corsair 24

Boat
- Displacement: 5,920 lb (2,685 kg)
- Draft: 3.42 ft (1.04 m)

Hull
- Type: monohull
- Construction: fiberglass
- LOA: 24.58 ft (7.49 m)
- LWL: 18.08 ft (5.51 m)
- Beam: 8.00 ft (2.44 m)
- Engine: outboard motor

Hull appendages
- Keel: modified long keel
- Ballast: 3,000 lb (1,361 kg)
- Rudder: keel-mounted rudder

Rig
- Rig type: Bermuda rig
- I foretriangle height: 30.30 ft (9.24 m)
- J foretriangle base: 9.20 ft (2.80 m)
- P mainsail luff: 26.40 ft (8.05 m)
- E mainsail foot: 11.50 ft (3.51 m)

Sails
- Sailplan: masthead sloop
- Mainsail area: 151.80 sq ft (14.103 m^{2})
- Jib/genoa area: 139.38 sq ft (12.949 m^{2})
- Total sail area: 291.18 sq ft (27.052 m^{2})

Racing
- PHRF: 270

The Bristol Corsair 24, also called the Bristol 24, Bristol 24 Corsair, Sailstar Corsair 24, Sailstar 24 and just the Corsair 24, is a recreational keelboat that was designed by Paul Coble and first built in 1964.

== Production ==
The design was initially built by the Sailstar Boat Company in the United States and sold as the Corsair 24. When Bristol Yachts bought out Sailstar in 1971, the designed was produced as the Bristol Corsair 24 until 1983. A total of 750 boats were completed, before production ended in 1983.

== Design ==
The hull is fiberglass. Some production models had balsa-cored decks, while others were solid fiberglass. It has a raked stem; a raise counter, angled transom; a keel-mounted rudder controlled by a tiller and a fixed, modified long keel, with a cutaway forefoot. It displaces 5,920 lb (2,685 kg) and carries 3,000 lb (1,361 kg) of ballast. The Sailstar boats have concrete ballast, while the Bristol ones have lead.

The boat has a draft of 3.42 ft (1.04 m) with the standard keel.

It has a masthead sloop rig.

The boat is normally fitted with a small 6 to 10 hp (4 to 7 kW) outboard motor for docking and maneuvering, although at some points during production an inboard engine was optional.

The design has two alternate interior arrangements: standard and dinette. The standard has two straight main cabin settees and provides sleeping accommodation for four people. The dinette model has sleeping accommodation for five, with its drop-down dinette table that can sleep two and an aft, starboard quarter berth. Both interiors have a double "V"-berth in the bow cabin, with the portable head underneath. On the standard model the galley is located on both sides just aft of the bow cabin. On the dinette model the galley is on the starboard side only. The galley is equipped with a two-burner stove, an ice box and a sink. Cabin headroom is 71 in (180 cm).

The design has a PHRF racing average handicap of 270 and a hull speed of 5.7 kn (10.6 km/h).

In a 2005 review in Cruising World Liz Shaw described the boat, "the solid hull of hand-laid fiberglass is heavy, even overbuilt — we hit a rock in Maine, and while the noise of the impact was terrifying, the hull suffered barely a scratch. The Bristol 24 was one of the most popular pocket cruisers of its time, when few boats offered more for the money."

In a 2010 review Steve Henkel wrote, "best features: ... the Corsair has virtually six feet of headroom in the cabin, unusual for a 25-foot sailboat. Worst features: ... the Corsair is not a boat you can plan to launch at a ramp for a casual afternoon sail, and then retrieve before cocktail hour. Not only is her 3' 5" draft not conducive to easy ramp launching, but on the trailer and equipped to sail away, the total weight is over 8,000 pounds, and requires a sizable towing vehicle rated to pull that big a load."

A Blue Water Boats review of the design says, "the popular little Bristol 24, also called the Corsair in earlier times, is a safe and solidly built pocket cruiser from the 1960s. Hundreds were built in hand-laid fiberglass by the Sailstar Boat Company and later Bristol Yachts in Rhode Island with a production run that spanned 17 years. This Paul Coble design, makes for a great little coastal cruiser, and with the right equipment can be made suitable for ocean voyaging."
