= Chrysler 26 =

Sailboat class

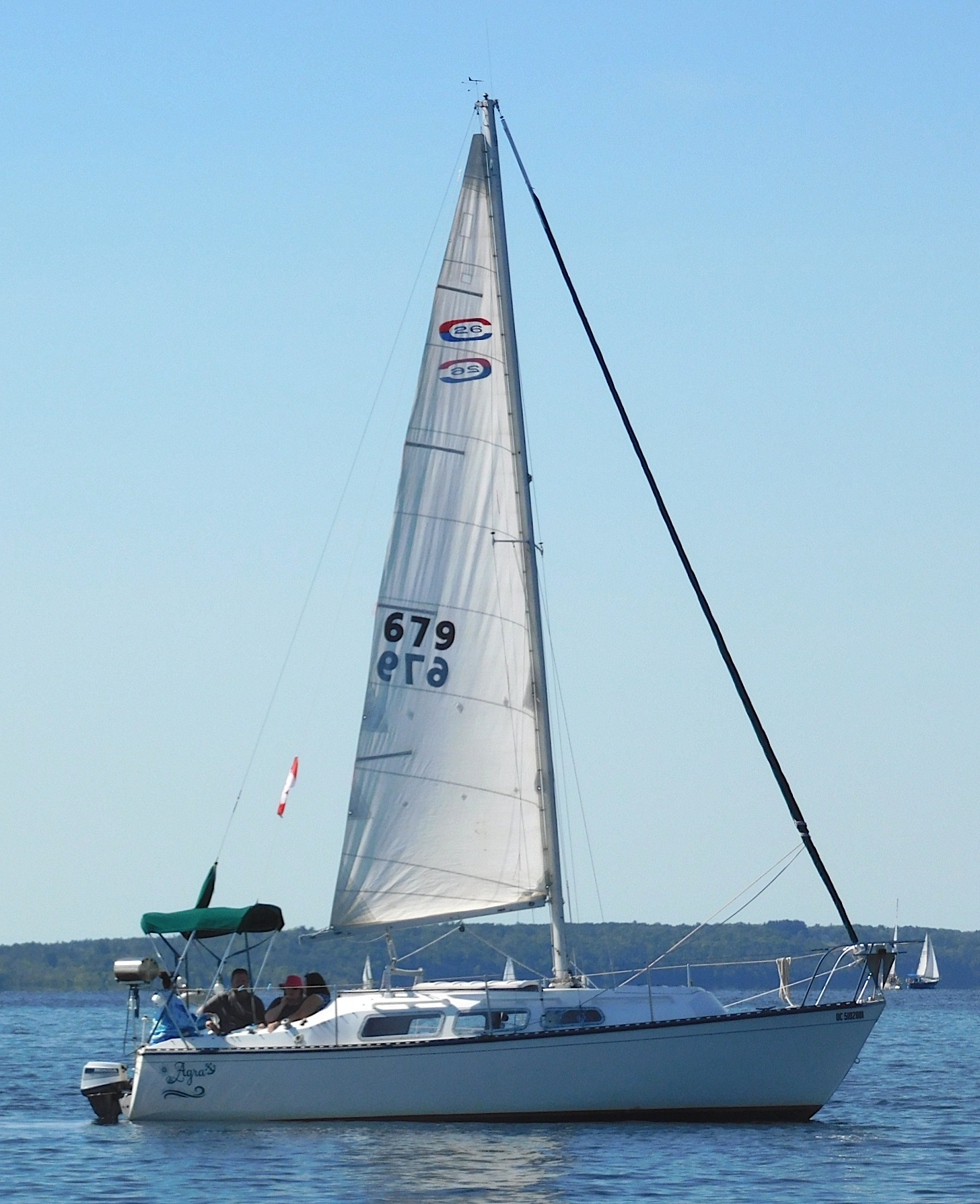
- Chrysler 26 Courser

Development
- Designer: Halsey Herreshoff
- Location: United States
- Year: 1977
- Builder: Chrysler Marine
- Role: Cruiser

Boat
- Displacement: 5,000 lb (2,268 kg)
- Draft: 6.25 ft (1.91 m) with keel down

Hull
- Type: monohull
- Construction: fiberglass
- LOA: 25.95 ft (7.91 m)
- LWL: 22.00 ft (6.71 m)
- Beam: 8.00 ft (2.44 m)
- Engine: outboard motor

Hull appendages
- Keel: swing keel
- Ballast: 1,900 lb (862 kg)
- Rudder: internally-mounted spade-type rudder

Rig
- Rig type: Bermuda rig
- I foretriangle height: 27.5 ft (8.4 m)
- J foretriangle base: 8.75 ft (2.67 m)
- P mainsail luff: 23.3 ft (7.1 m)
- E mainsail foot: 7.58 ft (2.31 m)

Sails
- Sailplan: fractional rigged sloop masthead sloop
- Mainsail area: 106 sq ft (9.8 m^{2})
- Jib/genoa area: 151 sq ft (14.0 m^{2})
- Total sail area: 257 sq ft (23.9 m^{2})

The Chrysler 26 is an American trailerable sailboat that was designed by Halsey Herreshoff as a cruiser and first built in 1977.

== Production ==
The design was built by Chrysler Marine in the United States, starting in 1977, but it is now out of production.

== Design ==
The Chrysler 26 is a recreational keelboat, built predominantly of fiberglass. It has a masthead sloop rig, a raked stem plumb stem, a nearly-plumb transom, an internally mounted spade-type rudder controlled by a tiller and a swing keel or optional fixed fin keel.

The boat was produced with two different deck plans, the flush-deck "Cruiser" and the "Courser", named for the bird, with a more conventional coach house cabin.

The boat is normally fitted with a small outboard motor for docking and maneuvering, although a diesel inboard was a factory option.

The design has sleeping accommodation for six people, with a double "V"-berth in the bow cabin, two straight settee berths in the main cabin and an aft cabin with a double berth. The head is fully enclosed. Cabin headroom is 72 in (183 cm).

For sailing downwind the design may be equipped with a symmetrical spinnaker of 480 sq ft (45 m^{2}).

The design has a hull speed of 6.29 kn (11.65 km/h).

== Variants ==
Chrysler 26
This model has a swing keel, displaces 5,000 lb (2,268 kg) and carries 1,900 lb (862 kg) of ballast. The boat has a draft of 6.17 ft (1.88 m) with the keel down and 2.25 ft (0.69 m) with it up, allowing operation in shallow water or ground transportation on a trailer.
Chrysler 26 FK
This fixed keel model displaces 5,500 lb (2,495 kg) and carries 2,400 lb (1,089 kg) of ballast. The boat has a draft of 3.92 ft (1.19 m) with the standard keel.

== Operational history ==
The boat is supported by an active class club the Chrysler Sailors and at one time also the Chrysler Sailing Association.

In a review SailRite wrote, "the Chrysler 26 is an excellent cruiser and features sleeping for six, with forward v-berth, double stern berth and two side berths. The Chrysler 26 also has an enclosed head for privacy. With six side windows and a translucent forward hatch there is plenty of ambient light."

== See also ==
- List of sailing boat types
