= Starwind 19 =

1980s American recreational keelboat

Development
- Designer: Jim Taylor Yacht Designs
- Location: United States
- Year: 1982
- No. built: 600
- Builders: Starwind; Chrysler Marine; Spindrift One Designs
- Role: Cruiser-Racer
- Name: Starwind 19

Boat
- Displacement: 1,350 lb (612 kg)
- Draft: 4.50 ft (1.37 m) with centerboard down

Hull
- Type: monohull
- Construction: fiberglass
- LOA: 18.58 ft (5.66 m)
- LWL: 15.58 ft (4.75 m)
- Beam: 7.50 ft (2.29 m)
- Engine: outboard motor

Hull appendages
- Keel: stub keel and centerboard
- Ballast: 395 lb (179 kg)
- Rudder: transom-mounted rudder

Rig
- Rig type: Bermuda rig
- I foretriangle height: 20.00 ft (6.10 m)
- J foretriangle base: 6.00 ft (1.83 m)
- P mainsail luff: 21.00 ft (6.40 m)
- E mainsail foot: 8.82 ft (2.69 m)

Sails
- Sailplan: fractional rigged sloop
- Mainsail area: 92.61 sq ft (8.604 m^{2})
- Jib/genoa area: 60.00 sq ft (5.574 m^{2})
- Total sail area: 152.61 sq ft (14.178 m^{2})

Racing
- PHRF: 288

The Starwind 19, Starwind 190 and Spindrift 19 are a family of American sailboats that were designed by Jim Taylor Yacht Designs as cruiser-racers and first built in 1982.

The designer claims that the boat was the inspiration for the C. Raymond Hunt Associates' O'Day 192.

== Production ==
The design was built by Starwind, the sailboat division of Wellcraft in the United States, starting in 1982. Some were built by Chrysler Marine and later by Spindrift One Designs, a division of Rebel Industries. The design is now out of production.

== Design ==
The Starwind 19 is a recreational keelboat, built predominantly of fiberglass, with wood trim. It has a fractional sloop rig, a raked stem, a reverse transom, a transom-hung rudder controlled by a tiller and a ballasted shoal draft keel with centerboard.

The boat is normally fitted with a small 3 to 6 hp (2 to 4 kW) outboard motor for docking and maneuvering.

The design has sleeping accommodation for four people, with a double "V"-berth in the bow cabin and two straight settee berths in the main cabin. The galley is located on the port side of the companionway ladder and is equipped with a sink. The head is located in the bow cabin under the "V"-berth. Cabin headroom is 38 in (97 cm) and the fresh water tank has a capacity of 2.5 U.S. gallons (9.5 L; 2.1 imp gal).

The design has a PHRF racing average handicap of 288 and a hull speed of 5.5 kn (10.2 km/h).

== Variants ==
Starwind 19
This model has a length overall of 18.58 ft (5.7 m), a waterline length of 15.58 ft (4.7 m), displaces 1,350 lb (612 kg) and carries 395 lb (179 kg) of ballast. The boat has a draft of 4.50 ft (1.37 m) with the centerboard down and 1.50 ft (0.46 m) with it retracted.
Starwind 190
Later version of the Starwind 19.
Spindrift 19
This model has a length overall of 18.75 ft (5.7 m), a waterline length of 15.58 ft (4.7 m), displaces 1,350 lb (612 kg) and carries 375 lb (170 kg) of ballast. The boat has a draft of 4.50 ft (1.37 m) with the centerboard down and 1.50 ft (0.46 m) with it retracted.

== Operational history ==
In a 2010 review Steve Henkel wrote, "Over 600 of these nice-looking boats were built ... Best features: The Starwind is a nicely conceived and well-made boat for her size and era. A good-sized opening hatch forward, rare in a boat this size, is good for ventilation and escape in an emergency An on-deck anchor locker is also a plus. The Starwind, with a PHRF of 288, may have a small advantage on the race course; even the smaller Precision 18, more than a foot shorter on deck, but with a waterline length only four inches less, and with eight square feet less sail area, has a handicap of only 282. Worst features: We could find none significant enough to mention."
