= Corinthian Yacht Club =

Corinthian Yacht Club may refer to:
Great Britain

- Royal Corinthian Yacht Club, Burnham-on-Crouch, England
- Forth Corinthian Yacht Club, Granton, Edinburgh, Scotland. Established 1880. Motto ‘Affordable sailing for all’
- Royal Corinthian Yacht Club of Cowes, Isle of Wight, England (1948–2014)

United States

- Bahia Corinthian Yacht Club, Newport Beach, California, United States
- Corinthian Sailing Club, Dallas, Texas, United States
- Corinthian Yacht Club, Marblehead, Marblehead, Massachusetts, United States.
- Corinthian Yacht Club of Cape May, New Jersey, United States.
- Corinthian Yacht Club of Seattle, Seattle, United States.
- Corinthian Yacht Club of Philadelphia, Pennsylvania, United States
- Chicago Corinthian Yacht Club, Chicago, Illinois, United States
- Dallas Corinthian Yacht Club, Oak Point, Texas, United States
- Essex Corinthian Yacht Club, Essex, Connecticut, United States
- Seawanhaka Corinthian Yacht Club, Oyster Bay, New York, United States
- Yale Corinthian Yacht Club of Yale University, United States
- Corinthian Yacht Club, Tiburon, California, United States
