= AMF 2100 =

Sailboat class

Development
- Designer: Ted Hood
- Location: United States
- Year: 1980
- Builder: AMF, Inc.
- Role: Racer-Cruiser
- Name: AMF 2100

Boat
- Displacement: 2,200 lb (998 kg)
- Draft: 4.00 ft (1.22 m) with keel extended

Hull
- Type: monohull
- Construction: fiberglass
- LOA: 21.08 ft (6.43 m)
- LWL: 17.58 ft (5.36 m)
- Beam: 8.00 ft (2.44 m)
- Engine: Outboard motor

Hull appendages
- Keel: lifting keel
- Ballast: 850 lb (386 kg)
- Rudder: transom-mounted rudder

Rig
- Rig type: Bermuda rig
- I foretriangle height: 23.91 ft (7.29 m)
- J foretriangle base: 8.00 ft (2.44 m)
- P mainsail luff: 25.25 ft (7.70 m)
- E mainsail foot: 9.00 ft (2.74 m)

Sails
- Sailplan: fractional rigged sloop
- Mainsail area: 113.63 sq ft (10.557 m^{2})
- Jib/genoa area: 95.64 sq ft (8.885 m^{2})
- Total sail area: 209.27 sq ft (19.442 m^{2})

Racing
- PHRF: 228

The AMF 2100 is an American trailerable sailboat that was designed by Ted Hood as a cruiser-racer and first built in 1980. The design's designation indicates its approximate length in hundredths of a foot.

== Production ==
The design was built by the Alcort division of AMF, Inc. in the United States, between 1980 and 1983, but it is now out of production.

The boat did not sell in large numbers as it was competing with the J/24, which had been introduced three years ahead of the AMF design.

== Design ==
The AMF 2100 is a recreational keelboat, built predominantly of fiberglass, with wood trim. It has a fractional sloop rig, a raked stem, a plumb transom, a transom-hung rudder controlled by a tiller and a lifting keel. It displaces 2,200 lb (998 kg) and carries 850 lb (386 kg) of lead keel ballast. The keel is lifted with a winch located in the cabin. The design has positive flotation and is unsinkable.

The boat has a draft of 4.00 ft (1.22 m) with the centerboard extended and 1.00 ft (0.30 m) with it retracted, allowing beaching or ground transportation on a trailer.

The boat is normally fitted with a small 3 to 6 hp (2 to 4 kW) outboard motor for docking and maneuvering.

The design has sleeping accommodation for four people, with two straight settees in the main cabin. Galley provisions include an optional portable stove, sink and cooler. The head is located in the bow, just forward of the keel trunk and partitioned from the main cabin by a curtain. Cabin headroom is 51 in (130 cm).

The design has a PHRF racing average handicap of 228 and a hull speed of 5.6 kn (10.4 km/h).

== Operational history ==
George Day reported on the introduction of the boat in the December 1979 issue of Cruising World, describing it as "a small, no-nonsense, trailerable racer-cruiser. She has a retractable daggerboard, a dinghy-type spade rudder and a flattish underwater profile. She should sail quickly in light airs ...."

In a January 1980 review in Yachting, sailboat reviewer Tony Gibbs wrote, "at the risk of throwing away a terrific punch line, let me begin by saying that after sailing the new AMF 2100, we bought one. Elaine and I had gone to Marblehead one hazy fall afternoon to photograph the little weekender-racer and to see what her designer, Ted Hood, had to say about his latest creation. His words and the boat's performance must have been pretty effective, because we came away almost completely decided that this raised-deck 21-footer was the right boat at the right time for us."

In a September 1980 Motor Boating and Sailing review, Oliver Moore wrote, "because of the space below, flush deck boats make sense. Trouble is, the profile is often ungainly. With its new 2100, AMF has done an outstanding job of camouflaging the topsides with a striking three-colored speed stripe that reduces the apparent height. Moreover, the sleek look fits the boat’s performance."

In a 2010 review Steve Henkel wrote, "best features: Here is a boat intended to race and also to cruise, with a tremendous amount of usable space for her LOD. In fact, her big freeboard and beam give her best space by a good margin relative to her comp[etitor]s. Also note her unusually shallow draft with keel raised, making trailering relatively easy. Worst features: The lifting keel, weighing over 800 pounds and controlled by a winch down below, must be somewhat of a nuisance to operate while underway, particularly during tight racing maneuvers when speed is of the essence. Also the keel trunk sits squarely in the middle of the cabin, making passage forward to the head awkward."

== See also ==
- List of sailing boat types
