= Scarab (boat) =

Boat

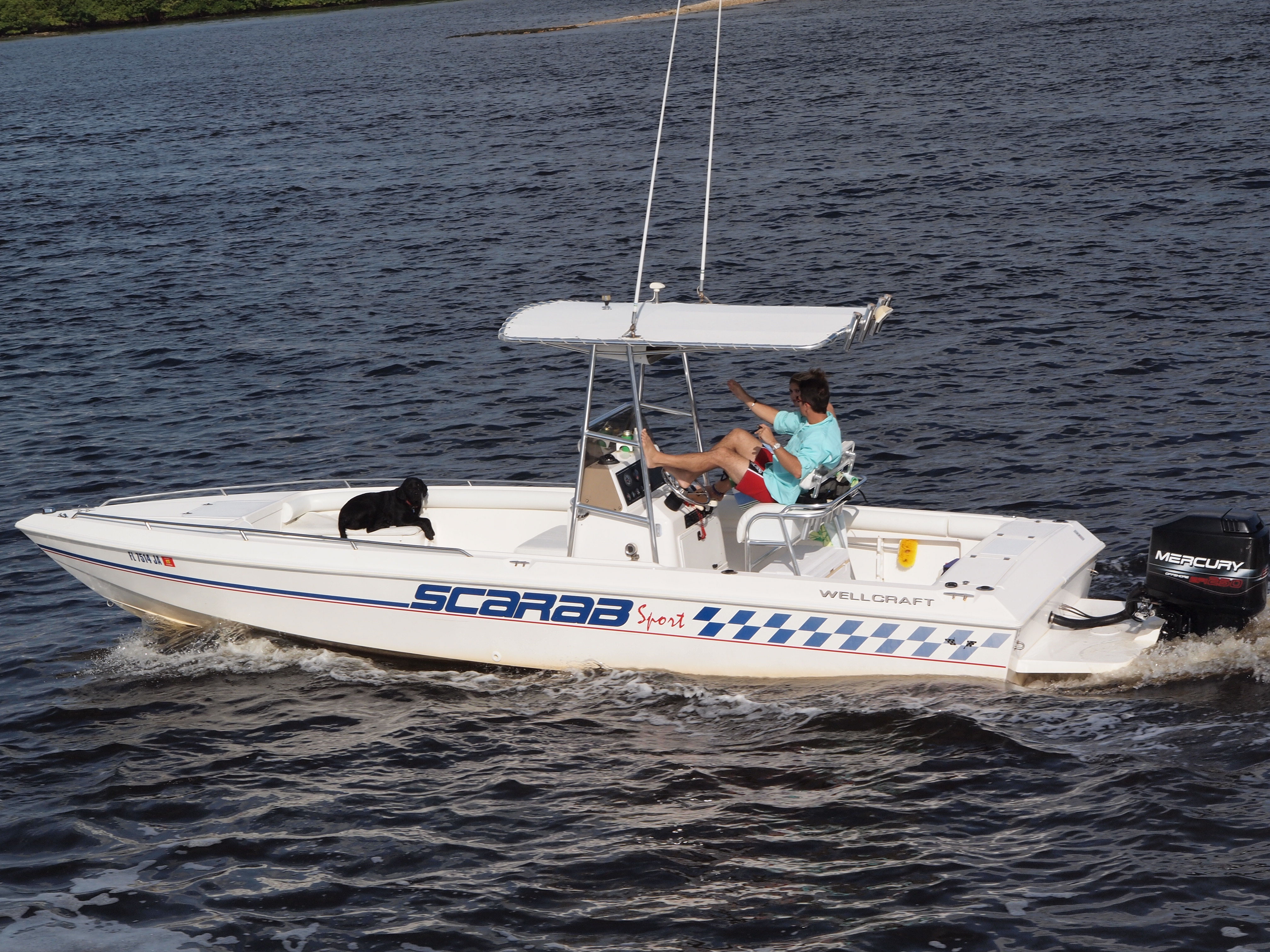
Wellcraft Scarab Sport

Scarab is a brand of high performance power boats formerly owned by Wellcraft and currently by Rec Boat Holdings, a subsidiary of Groupe Beneteau. Wellcraft still makes a line of fishing boats which are currently known as Scarab Offshore.

Scarab boats were popularly featured in the 1980s TV series Miami Vice. As of the second season of the series, the main character Sonny Crockett piloted a Wellcraft 38 Scarab KV. In Riptide, the counterpart to the eponymous boat where the detectives work is the Ebb Tide, a 38' Scarab powered by KAAMA Power Systems. Scarab also was a main feature of the TV show Baywatch from season 2 onwards. One was used by television presenter Richard Hammond in a special episode of The Grand Tour entitled "The grand tour presents... Seamen". The boat livery originally said "Razzle Dazzle" but this was changed by co-presenters Jeremy Clarkson and James May to say "Jizzle Drizzle".

Several Scarab boats were featured in Terry "Hulk Hogan"'s Thunder in Paradise TV series, including the Thunder boat itself.
