= Herreshoff America =

Sailboat class

Development
- Designer: Halsey Chase Herreshoff
- Location: United States
- Year: 1971
- Builders: Nowak & Williams; Squadron Yachts; Nauset Marine
- Role: Cruiser

Boat
- Displacement: 2,500 lb (1,134 kg)
- Draft: 5.00 ft (1.52 m) with centerboard down

Hull
- Type: monohull
- Construction: fiberglass
- LOA: 18.16 ft (5.54 m)
- LWL: 17.75 ft (5.41 m)
- Beam: 8.00 ft (2.44 m)
- Engine: outboard motor

Hull appendages
- Keel: centerboard
- Ballast: 500 lb (227 kg)
- Rudder: transom-mounted rudder

Rig
- Rig type: Cat rig

Sails
- Sailplan: Gaff-rigged catboat
- Mainsail area: 260.00 sq ft (24.155 m^{2})
- Total sail area: 260.00 sq ft (24.155 m^{2})

Racing
- PHRF: 324

The Herreshoff America, also called the Herreshoff America 18, is an American trailerable sailboat that was designed by Halsey Chase Herreshoff as a cruiser and first built in 1971.

== Production ==
The design was built by Nowak & Williams in Bristol, Rhode Island, United States, starting in 1971. It was also later built by Squadron Yachts of Bristol, Rhode Island and Nauset Marine of Orleans, Massachusetts, but it is now out of production. The molds and tooling were acquired by Com-Pac Yachts in about 2002 and the design was developed into the Com-Pac Horizon Cat.

It was also developed into the Herreshoff Eagle in 1976.

== Design ==
The Herreshoff America is a recreational sailboat, built predominantly of fiberglass, with wood trim. It is a gaff-rigged catboat with a plumb stem and a plumb transom; a shallow, transom-hung rudder controlled by a tiller and retractable, steel centerboard that stows in a trunk. It displaces 2,500 lb (1,134 kg) and carries 500 lb (227 kg) of lead ballast.

The boat has a draft of 5.00 ft (1.52 m) with the centerboard extended and 1.83 ft (0.56 m) with it retracted, allowing operation in shallow water, beaching or ground transportation on a trailer.

The boat is normally fitted with a small 4 to 6 hp (3 to 4 kW) well-mounted outboard motor for docking and maneuvering.

The design has sleeping accommodation for two people, with a double "V"-berth in the bow. The galley is located on the starboard side just forward of the companionway ladder. The galley is U-shaped and is equipped with a single-burner stove and a sink. The head is located opposite the galley on the port side. The cabin headroom is 48 in (122 cm).

The design has a PHRF racing average handicap of 324 and a hull speed of 5.6 kn (10.4 km/h).

== Operational history ==
In a 2010 review, Steve Henkel wrote, "best features: The outboard, mounted in the cockpit, is more convenient to operate than one hung on a transom bracket would have been. The centerboard has a relatively high aspect ratio, which adds efficiency upwind. Some sailors may prefer sacrificing privacy for an aft head position, which gives unlimited headroom with the hatch open. Price on the used market compared with the generally better finished comp[etitor]s tends to be at the low end of the scale. Worst features: The prop of the outboard, mounted in a cockpit well, can't be tilted out of the water, making for extra drag and possible fouling if the motor is left in place between voyages. The centerboard is steel, requiring extra maintenance to prevent rust."

== See also ==
- List of sailing boat types

Related development

- Com-Pac Horizon Cat
