= Boot money =

Boot money refers to money paid privately or anonymously to amateur athletes, often to circumvent laws or league regulations prohibiting athlete compensation. It can be paid as an incentive to win or as a reward for a good performance, but especially in more recent times can involve a company rewarding players for using their apparel or products. This phenomenon has been found in amateur sports for centuries. The term "boot money" became popularised in the late 1880s when British football leagues prohibited professionalism, but it was not unusual for players to find a half crown (two shillings and sixpence) in their boots after a game (worth around £66 in 2009, calculated by the rise in average earnings). Before the breaking of the £20 wage-cap by Johnny Haynes, many British football players received ciphered boot money, by fans paying for entrance but not being counted in an official match attendance. This method was also a way of escaping tax deductions too.

== Scandals ==
In 1982, Adidas was paying British Olympic athletes to wear their gear. The main person involved in the scandal was Horst Dassler.

A scandal broke out over payments alleged to have been made to some Welsh rugby union internationals during the 1970s. Many other ways were found to work around the laws of rugby union amateurism.

== See also ==
- Shamateurism
