= Wellcraft =

Powerboats manufacturer in America

Wellcraft is a brand of American powerboats. It was founded in 1955, making wooden runabouts. The company is owned by Groupe Beneteau, part of its Rec Boat subsidiary.

== Acquisitions ==
In 1982, Wellcraft purchased California Yachts from the Marshall Boat Company and in 1987 sold it back to them.

In 2014, Groupe Beneteau acquired Rec Boat Holdings (Wellcraft, Four Winns, Scarab, and Glastron).

== Education programs ==
Wellcraft created the Wellcraft Saltwater Fishing School to teach new Wellcraft owners how to become better fishermen. It also created Wellcraft's High Performance Boot Camp to teach new Wellcraft owners how to get "maximum thrills" out of their new purchase while operating them safely.

== Product line ==
Its Scarab line of boats, specifically, the Scarab 38 KV was featured on Miami Vice. The Wellcraft Scarab 38 KVs were a 28-hued, twin 440-hp boat that sold for $130,000 in 1986. As a result of the publicity the show gave Wellcraft, the company received "an onslaught of orders", increasing sales by 21 percent in one year.

In appreciation, Wellcraft gave Don Johnson an exact duplicate of the boat featured on the show. Altogether, one hundred copies of the boat (dubbed the "Scarab 38KV Miami Vice Edition") were built by Wellcraft. The Miami Vice graphics and color scheme, which included turquoise, aqua, and orchid, was available by special order on any model Scarab from 20–38 feet.

Don Johnson also designed the Scarab Excel 43 ft, Don Johnson Signature Series (DJSS), and raced a similar one. The Don Johnson Signature Series was powered by twin 650-hp Lamborghini V-12's, which caused some problems to the design of the boat due to their size. Overall the boat cost $300,000 with each engine amounting to between $60–$70,000.

== Starwind division ==
In the 1980s, Wellcraft started a sailboat division, called Starwind. The division operated until about 1984, producing a line of small sailboats, including the Starwind 19, Starwind 22, Starwind 223 and Buccaneer 18 centerboard boats.
