= Herreshoff Eagle =

Sailboat class

Development
- Designer: Halsey Chase Herreshoff
- Location: United States
- Year: 1976
- Builders: Nowak & Williams; Squadron Yachts; Nauset Marine; Tillotson-Pearson
- Role: Cruiser
- Name: Herreshoff Eagle

Boat
- Displacement: 2,700 lb (1,225 kg)
- Draft: 4.00 ft (1.22 m) with centerboard down

Hull
- Type: monohull
- Construction: fiberglass
- LOA: 22.00 ft (6.71 m)
- LWL: 18.00 ft (5.49 m)
- Beam: 8.17 ft (2.49 m)
- Engine: outboard motor

Hull appendages
- Keel: stub keel and centerboard
- Ballast: 700 lb (318 kg)
- Rudder: transom-mounted rudder

Rig
- Rig type: Gaff rigged sloop

Sails
- Sailplan: topsail gaff-rigged masthead sloop
- Total sail area: 320.00 sq ft (29.729 m^{2})

The Herreshoff Eagle, also called the Herreshoff Eagle 21, is an American trailerable sailboat that was designed by Halsey Chase Herreshoff as a cruiser and first built in 1976.

The Herreshoff Eagle is a development of the Herreshoff America, with a clipper bow, bowsprit and a gaffhead sloop rig.

== Production ==
The design was initially built by Nowak & Williams in Bristol, Rhode Island, United States. It was also later built by Tillotson-Pearson and Squadron Yachts, both of Bristol, Rhode Island, and Nauset Marine of Orleans, Massachusetts, but it is now out of production.

== Design ==
The Herreshoff Eagle is a recreational keelboat, built predominantly of fiberglass, with wood trim. It is a topsail gaff-rigged masthead sloop; with a clipper bow and bowsprit; a plumb transom; a shallow, transom-hung rudder controlled by a wheel and a stub keel with a retractable centerboard. It displaces 2,700 lb (1,225 kg) and carries 700 lb (318 kg) of lead ballast.

The boat has a draft of 4.00 ft (1.22 m) with the centerboard extended and 1.83 ft (0.56 m) with it retracted, allowing operation in shallow water or ground transportation on a trailer.

The boat is normally fitted with a small 4 to 6 hp (3 to 4 kW) stern well-mounted outboard motor for docking and maneuvering.

The design has sleeping accommodation for two people, with a double "V"-berth in the bow. The galley is located on the starboard side just forward of the companionway ladder. The galley is equipped with a sink. The head is located opposite the galley on the port side. Cabin headroom is 48 in (122 cm).

For sailing the design is equipped with boom-mounted jib.

The design has a hull speed of 5.7 kn (10.6 km/h).

== Operational history ==
In a 2010 review Steve Henkel wrote, "although the ads didn't say so, this boat appears to be the Herreshoff America 18 dressed up in an old-timey costume with a bowsprit, topsail, and jib added. Strangely, the ads at first called her a '21' and later she became a '22.' though by scaling off her LOD from the plans, we measure her as an '18.' We wonder why the builders, no longer around to ask, advertised her with such a major discrepancy in size. Best features: To some she may appear to be a pretty replica of a 19th century vessel, though we doubt that she has a close resemblance to any real boat of the past. Her good features generally match the Herreshoff America 18 ... Worst features: The rather long bowsprit and small forward deck with no lifelines or rails make dousing the jib a precarious and chancy affair. The “clipper bow” appears to us to be inappropriate to use with the fat bull and the blunt stern, though some might feel it looks okay. Wheel rather than tiller on a boat this size is a bad idea, reducing control rather than improving it."

== See also ==
- List of sailing boat types

Related development

- Herreshoff America
