= Bristol Caravel 22 =

Sailboat class

Development
- Designer: Halsey Chase Herreshoff
- Location: United States
- Year: 1968
- No. built: 325
- Builders: Bristol Yachts; Sailstar Boat Company
- Role: Cruiser
- Name: Bristol Caravel 22

Boat
- Displacement: 2,850 lb (1,293 kg)
- Draft: 3.50 ft (1.07 m)

Hull
- Type: monohull
- Construction: fiberglass
- LOA: 22.00 ft (6.71 m)
- LWL: 19.50 ft (5.94 m)
- Beam: 7.75 ft (2.36 m)
- Engine: outboard motor

Hull appendages
- Keel: fin keel
- Ballast: 1,150 lb (522 kg)
- Rudder: internally-mounted spade-type rudder

Rig
- Rig type: Bermuda rig
- I foretriangle height: 26.00 ft (7.92 m)
- J foretriangle base: 9.00 ft (2.74 m)
- P mainsail luff: 22.00 ft (6.71 m)
- E mainsail foot: 8.00 ft (2.44 m)

Sails
- Sailplan: masthead sloop
- Mainsail area: 88.00 sq ft (8.175 m^{2})
- Jib/genoa area: 117.00 sq ft (10.870 m^{2})
- Total sail area: 205.00 sq ft (19.045 m^{2})

Racing
- PHRF: 288

The Bristol Caravel 22, sometimes called the Bristol 22 Caravel, Sailstar Caravel, or just the Caravel 22, is a recreational keelboat that was designed by Halsey Chase Herreshoff and first built in 1968. It is named for the class of sailing ship.

== Production ==
The design was initially built by the Sailstar Boat Company in the United States and sold as the Caravel 22. When Bristol Yachts acquired Sailstar in 1971 the design was produced as the Bristol Caravel 22. A total of 325 boats were built from 1968 until 1978, but it is now out of production.

== Design ==
The Bristol Caravel 22 is built predominantly of fiberglass, with wood trim. It has a masthead sloop rig, a raked stem, an angled transom, an internally mounted spade-type rudder controlled by a tiller and a fixed fin keel or stub keel and centerboard. The centerboard model has a short rudder that matches the stub keel depth. The cockpit is self-draining. It displaces 2,850 lb (1,293 kg) and carries 1,150 lb (522 kg) of lead ballast.

The keel-equipped version of the boat has a draft of 3.50 ft (1.07 m), while the centreboard-equipped version has a draft of 4.33 ft (1.32 m) with the centerboard extended and 2.5 ft (0.76 m) with it retracted, allowing ground transportation on a trailer.

The boat is normally fitted with a small, well-mounted 3 to 6 hp (2 to 4 kW) outboard motor for docking and maneuvering.

The design has sleeping accommodation for four or five people, with a double "V"-berth in the bow cabin and two straight settees in the main cabin or an optional dinette that lowers into a double berth, plus a starboard aft quarter berth. The galley is located on the starboard side just forward of the companionway ladder. The galley is equipped with a two-burner stove, a lift-top ice chest and a sink. The head is located just aft of the bow cabin on the port side and is enclosed with a curtain. Cabin headroom is 48 in (120 cm).

The design has a PHRF racing average handicap of 288 and a hull speed of 5.8 kn (10.7 km/h).

In a 2010 review Steve Henkel wrote, "the boat could be purchased either with a standard layout with settee berths port and starboard, or with the dinette arrangement ... which supposedly will sleep five (though we wouldn't want to try sleeping in the "double" formed by the table lowered flush with the dinette seats, which is barely three feet wide). Another choice for new buyers was either a center-boarder ... or a fin-keel boat with a draft of 3' 6". Best features: The outboard well in the cockpit makes life easier for the helmsman when maneuvering in tight quarters. Worst features: A peculiarity of the centerboarder is her shallow rudder, necessary to keep it out of harm's way when negotiating shoal waters with board up. It raises the question of whether the rudder has enough area to provide good steering control. If so, why is the area enlarged for the fin-keel version? Why not, instead, cut wetted surface on the fin-keel version's rudder to improve performance?"
