= Bristol 45.5 =

Sailboat class

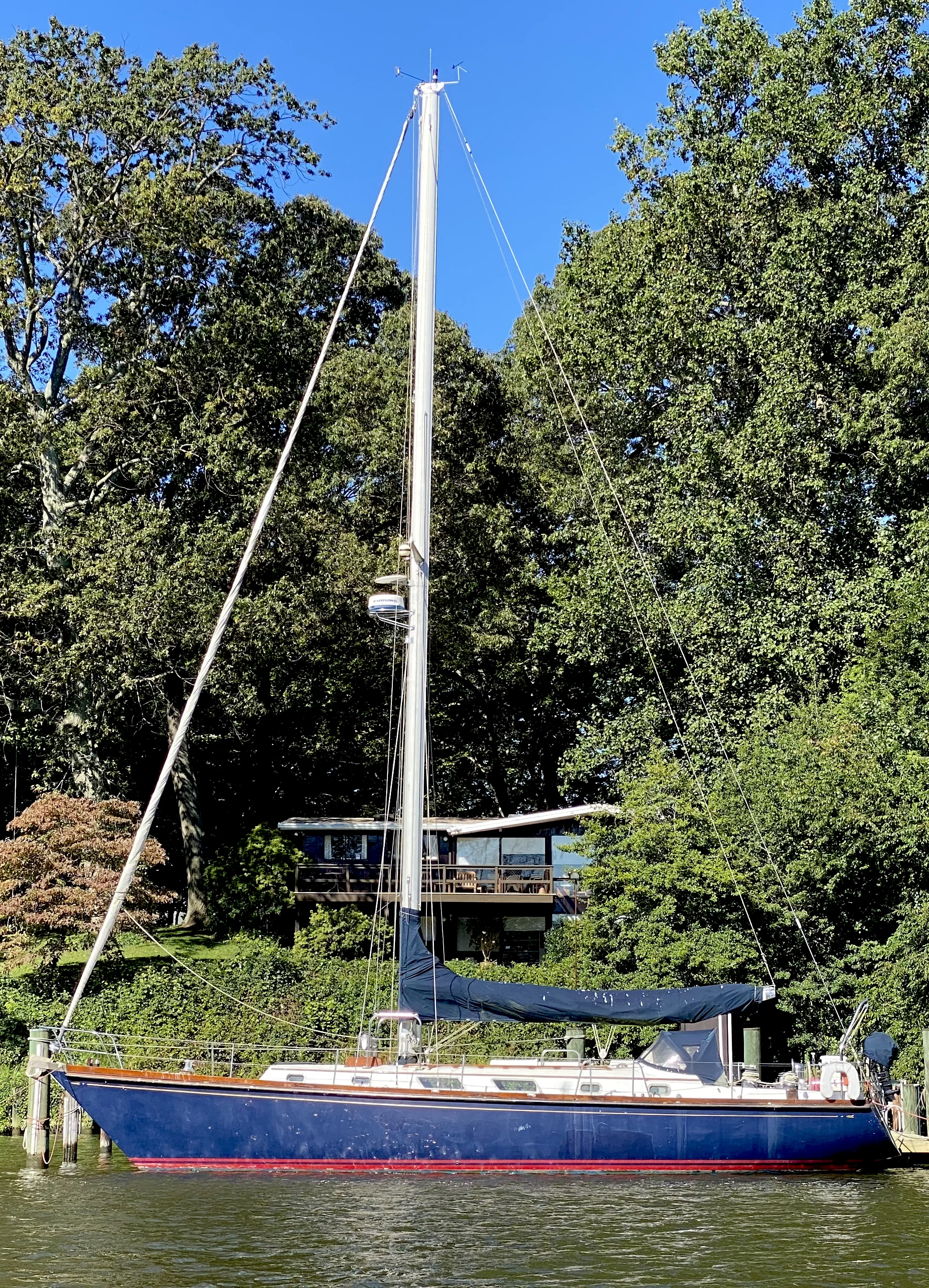
- 1979 model Bristol 45.5 Aft Cockpit

Development
- Designer: Ted Hood; Dieter Empacher
- Location: United States
- Year: 1979
- Builder: Bristol Yachts
- Role: Racer-Cruiser
- Name: Bristol 45.5

Boat
- Displacement: 34,660 lb (15,722 kg)
- Draft: 4.9 ft (1.5 m) board up; 11.0 ft (3.4 m) board down
- Air draft: 63.5 ft (19.4 m)

Hull
- Type: Monohull
- Construction: Fiberglass
- LOA: 45.25 ft (13.79 m)
- LWL: 37.25 ft (11.35 m)
- Beam: 13.17 ft (4.01 m)

Hull appendages
- Keel: fin keel with centerboard
- Ballast: 15,000 lb (6,804 kg)
- Rudder: skeg-mounted rudder

Rig
- Rig type: Bermuda rig
- I foretriangle height: 56.00 ft (17.07 m)
- J foretriangle base: 18.50 ft (5.64 m)
- P mainsail luff: 50.00 ft (15.24 m)
- E mainsail foot: 18.00 ft (5.49 m)

Sails
- Sailplan: Masthead sloop
- Mainsail area: 445.00 sq ft (41.342 m^{2})
- Jib/genoa area: 792.00 sq ft (73.579 m^{2}) 150% genoa; 680.00 sq ft (63.174 m^{2}) 130% genoa
- Total sail area: 988.50 sq ft (91.835 m^{2})

Racing
- PHRF: 111

The Bristol 45.5 is an American sailboat that was designed by Ted Hood and Dieter Empacher as a racer-cruiser, first built in 1979 and last built in 1989.

== Production ==
The Bristol 45.5 was produced 1979–1989 and was replaced in production by the Bristol 47.7, which was built from approximately 1989 to 1994. Both are related designs, from the same hull molds, but the 47.7 was modified with a longer stern and a traditional transom as opposed to the 45.5's reverse transom.

The Bristol 45.5 was built by Bristol Yachts in Bristol, Rhode Island, United States. The company produced 75 examples of the 45.5 and 47.7 together, but it is now out of production.

== Design ==
The Bristol 45.5 is a recreational keelboat, built predominantly of fiberglass, with wood trim. It has a masthead sloop rig, or an optional ketch rig, with aluminum spars. It features a raked stem, a raised counter reverse transom, a skeg-mounted rudder controlled by an Edson wheel and a fixed fin keel with retractable centerboard. It displaces 34,660 lb (15,722 kg) and carries 15,000 lb (6,804 kg) of lead ballast.

The boat has a draft of 4.9 ft (1.5 m) with the centerboard retracted and 11.0 ft (3.4 m) with it extended.

The design has a PHRF racing average handicap of 111.
