= Little Harbor 44 =

1980s American recreational keelboat

Development
- Designer: Ted Hood
- Location: United States
- Year: 1983
- Builder: Little Harbor Custom Yachts
- Role: Cruiser
- Name: Little Harbor 44

Boat
- Displacement: 30,700 lb (13,925 kg)
- Draft: 5.0 ft (1.5 m) board up; 10.18 ft (3.10 m) board down
- Air draft: 62 ft (19 m)

Hull
- Type: Monohull
- Construction: Fiberglass
- LOA: 44.25 ft (13.49 m)
- LWL: 36.50 ft (11.13 m)
- Beam: 13.67 ft (4.17 m)
- Engine: Westerbeke 58

Hull appendages
- Keel: fin keel with centerboard
- Ballast: 12,000 lb (5,443 kg)
- Rudder: partial skeg-mounted rudder

Rig
- Rig type: Bermuda rig
- I foretriangle height: 57.00 ft (17.37 m)
- J foretriangle base: 18.50 ft (5.64 m)
- P mainsail luff: 50.25 ft (15.32 m)
- E mainsail foot: 16.25 ft (4.95 m)

Sails
- Sailplan: Masthead sloop
- Mainsail area: 409.95 sq ft (38.086 m^{2})
- Jib/genoa area: 527.25 sq ft (48.983 m^{2})
- Total sail area: 937.00 sq ft (87.050 m^{2})

Racing
- PHRF: 108-111

The Little Harbor 44 is an American sailboat that was designed by Ted Hood and first built in 1983.

== Production ==
The Little Harbor 44 was produced from 1983-1987 by Little Harbor Custom Yachts in Marblehead, Massachusetts, United States. Little Harbor was owned by the boat's designer, Ted Hood. Fifteen Little Harbor 44s were built. The boats were built for Little Harbor by Alexander Marine Co., Ltd., in Kaohsiung, Taiwan.

== Design ==
=== Overview ===
The Little Harbor 44 was designed by Ted Hood for his Little Harbor line of yachts. It is a recreational keelboat, built predominantly of fiberglass, with teak wood trim. It has a masthead sloop rig with aluminum spars. It features a raked stem, a raised counter reverse transom, a partial skeg-mounted rudder controlled by a wheel and a fixed fin keel with retractable centerboard. It displaces 30,700 lb (13,925 kg) and carries 12,000 lb (5,443 kg) of lead ballast. The boat has a draft of 5.0 ft (1.5 m) with the centerboard retracted and 10.18 ft (3.10 m) with it extended.

=== Construction ===
The Little Harbor 44 was constructed of fiberglass with an Airex foam core in the hull and Divinycell foam core in the decks. This construction was chosen for improved sound and thermal insulation, rather than reducing weight as is sometimes the justification for cored hulls.

=== Layout ===
Four choices of layout were available. However, the design was produced on a semi-custom basis. Of the first ten hulls, no two shared a layout. Aft cockpit models were available with two heads (Plan A) or one head (Plan B). Center cockpit models were available with a split aft berth offering a double and a single (Plan A) or a centerline queen berth (Plan B).

=== Racing ===
The design has a PHRF racing average handicap of 110.

== Equipment ==
=== Structural ===
The Little Harbor 44 features a molded one-piece fiberglass hull and deck with a gelcoat finish. The rudder is two-part, molded with stainless steel rudder stock and internal framework. The centerboard is two part, with a bronze shoe on the leading edge. The centerboard trunk was molded into the hull, below the cabin sole. Internal lead ballast was cast in place and covered in fiberglass. Fuel and water tanks were molded in fiberglass integral to the hull. An overlapping deck to hull joint was bolted together and sealed with epoxy. Stainless steel chain plates were bolted to built-in fiberglass knees. The mast step is also of stainless steel, and is adjustable. For all structural and divisional bulkheads, marine grade waterproof plywood was used.

=== Mechanical ===
The engine is a Westerbeke 58 hp (43 kW) diesel engine with electric stop and alarm system for engine temperature and oil pressure. There is a solid bronze propeller. Engine controls and instruments are mounted on a molded steering pedestal. The wet exhaust system has a lift to transom discharge. The centerboard hoist system is watertight and has a winch mounted on deck. A stainless steel 17 gallon water heater was equipped. An Edson Steering System with custom stainless steel radial drive steering quadrant was fitted.

=== Plumbing ===
All through-hull fittings are equipped with bronze seacocks. There are two manual bilge pumps, as well as an automatic electric bilge pump. There are eight cockpit and deck scuppers. There is a pressurized water system and manual fresh and salt water pumps in the galley. The galley sink has a macerator pump which also serves the ice box drain. Automatic shower pumps are included, with a flexible shower unit and molded shower pan in each head. The sanitation system includes manual/electric heads and a Lectra San Type III marine sanitation device (MSD). Total fuel capacity is approximately 100 gallons in two tanks and total water capacity is approximately 200 gallons in three tanks.

=== Electrical ===
The electrical panel is custom built with 12 and 120 volt circuit breakers. Two engine alternators provide charging capacity of over 100 amps. Four heavy duty marine batteries are equipped, with a 12 volt 40 amp battery charger. There is a 120 volt 50 amp shore power cable as well. Also fitted are an engine compartment blower; oscillating fans in all cabins; and navigation lights, night vision lights, overhead, and bulkhead lights. All electrical runs are accessible through removable teak panels.

=== Interior ===
Solid teak joinery is throughout, and there are teak cabin doors and locker doors as well as a teak and holly cabin sole. Laminated teak overhead deck beams are offset by off-white Formica panels. In solid teak are grab rails, a chart table, the companionway ladder, and the hi-lo dinette table. Teak or Formica are the materials for all bulkheads and cabinetry. Both staterooms feature a double berth filler piece. Fine quality leatherette upholstery is throughout. All exposed surfaces have a teak hull liner. Hanging lockers are lined with camphor wood. Head compartments are lined with off-white Formica and solid teak trim. There is an insulated, removable engine cover for easy access in the main salon.

=== Galley ===
The galley features Formica cabinetry and countertops. There is a deluxe stainless steel three burner stove with oven, broiler, and safety solenoid switch. The stove compartment is lined with stainless steel. There is an insulated, divided ice box with plexiglass shelves. Also fitted is a double stainless steel galley sink, utensil drawers, and a garbage bin. Storage includes three drawers and eleven separate lockers.

=== Deck ===
The following fittings are stainless steel: stemhead fitting with anchor roller and mooring fairleads built in; stern and springline chocks; stanchions and stern/bow pulpits with double lifelines and gates each side. There are 14 custom opening portholes with stainless steel frames, 7 aluminum deck hatches with tinted plexiglass, a teak-framed companionway hatch opening with solid teak drop slides, and a tinted plexiglass companionway hatch slide with a teak frame and bronze runners. A solid teak toe rail, handrails, drip rail, cockpit coaming cups, and seat fiddles are all fitted as well. There are 5 solid teak dorade boxes with plexiglass tops and stainless steel cowl vents. The compass is a 6-inch Danforth Constellation in a stainless steel binnacle. The reacher and genoa tracks are stainless steel and include lead blocks. Winches are Barient, with Barient 32 self-tailing primary winches featuring stainless steel drums and a Barient 23 self-tailing mainsheet winch, also with a stainless steel drum.

=== Spars and Rigging ===
The boat has a double spreader sloop rig with an extruded aluminum mast and boom. The standing rigging is wire, and the running rigging includes internal main and genoa halyards, two genoa sheets, a mainsheet, a boom outhaul and topping lift, a four-part boom vang and preventer, and two flag and burgee halyards. There are also two mainsail and genoa halyard winches with cleats. A halyard sheave box is included for a staysail. There are boom vang bales on the mast and the boom. A masthead 360-degree white light is included for anchoring, as well as a combination steaming/flood light. There is a mast collar as well as a rubber mast boot. The mast and boom are painted with Imron.

== Operational history ==
Hull number 1 of six center cockpit versions built was named Robin Too, and was designer and builder Ted Hood's personal boat. It is a center cockpit version with the "Plan A" layout.
