= Amateur sports =

Sport played by non-professionals

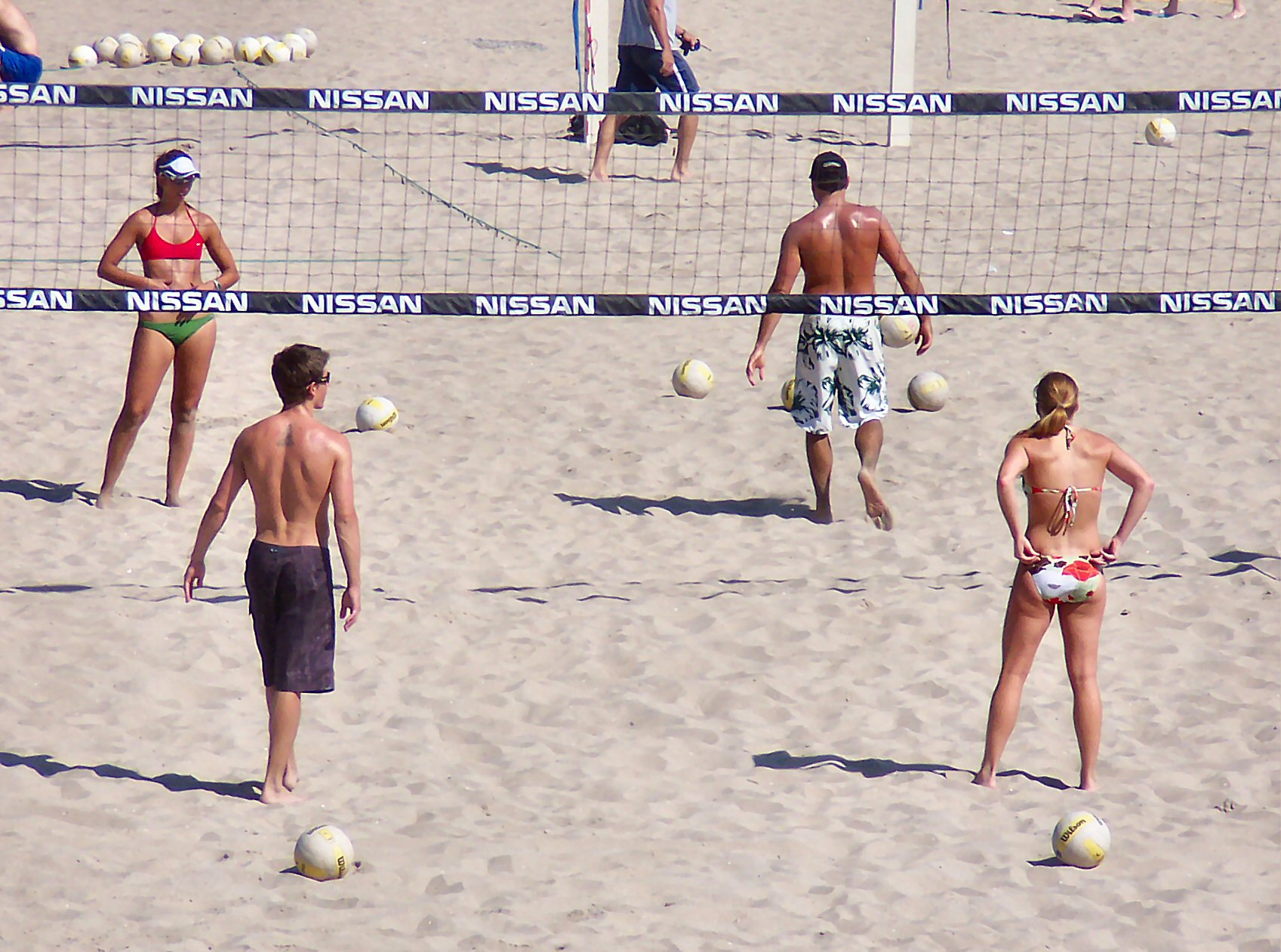
An amateur mixed doubles match of beach volleyball

Amateur sports are sports in which participants generally compete without receiving payment for their participation. The distinction is made between amateur sporting participants and professional sporting participants, who are paid for the time they spend competing and training. In many sports which feature professional players, professionals generally compete at a higher level than amateur competitors, although the distinction is not universal. Most people who participate in sports worldwide do so at a non-professional level.

Amateurism was a strongly defended ideal in 19th-century sport, particularly among the upper and middle classes, but it declined during the 20th century as professional sport and commercialisation expanded with the continuing growth of professional sport and the increasing commercialisation of amateur and collegiate sports, and is now retained as a principle by relatively few sports-governing organisations, even though some organisations continue to use the word "amateur" in their names or titles.

== Background ==
Modern organized sports developed in the 19th century, with the United Kingdom and the United States taking the lead. Sporting culture was especially strong in private schools and universities, and the upper and middle-class men who attended those institutions played as amateurs. Opportunities for working classes to participate in sport were restricted by their long six-day work weeks and Sunday Sabbatarianism. In the UK, the Factory Act 1844 gave working men half a day off, making the opportunity to take part in sport more widely available. Working class sportsmen found it hard to play top level sport due to having to turn up for work. On occasion, cash prizes, particularly in individual competitions, could make up the difference; some competitors also wagered on the outcomes of their matches. As professional teams developed, some clubs were willing to make "broken time" payments to players, i.e., to pay top sportsmen to take time off work, and as attendances increased, paying men to concentrate on their sport full-time became feasible. Proponents of the amateur ideal deplored the influence of money and the effect it has on sports. It was claimed that it is in the interest of the professional to receive the highest amount of pay possible per unit of performance, not to perform to the highest standard possible where this does not bring additional benefit.

The middle- and upper-class men who dominated the sporting establishment not only had a theoretical preference for amateurism, but they also had a self-interest in blocking the professionalization of sport, which threatened to make it feasible for the working classes to compete against them with success. Working class sportsmen did not see why they should not be paid to play. Hence, there were competing interests between those who wished sport to be open to all and those who feared that professionalism would destroy the "Corinthian spirit", summed up as "sportsmanship, fair play, [and] playing for the love of the game". This conflict played out over the course of more than one hundred years. Some sports dealt with it relatively easily, such as golf, which decided in the late 19th century to tolerate competition between amateurs and professionals, while others were traumatized by the dilemma, and took generations to fully come to terms with professionalism, even to the result of causing a breakdown in the sport (as in the case of rugby union and rugby league in 1895).

=== Corinthian ===
Corinthian has come to describe one of the most virtuous of amateur athletes—those who value fairness and honor in competition above victory or gain. The Corinthian Yacht Club (now the Royal Corinthian Yacht Club, RCYC) was established in Essex in 1872 with "encouragement of Amateur Yacht sailing" as its "primary object". To that end, club rules ensured that crews consisted of amateurs, while "no professional or paid hand is allowed to touch the tiller or in any way assist in steering." Although the RCYC website derives the name Corinthian from the Isthmian Games of ancient Corinth, the Oxford English Dictionary derives the noun Corinthian from "the proverbial wealth, luxury, and licentiousness of ancient Corinth", with senses developing from "a wealthy man" (attested in 1577) through "a licentious man" (1697) and "a man of fashion about town" (1819) to "a wealthy amateur of sport who rides his own horses, steers his own yacht, etc" (1823). Dixon Kemp wrote in A Manual of Yacht and Boat Sailing published in 1900, "The term Corinthian half a century ago was commonly applied to the aristocratic patrons of sports, some of which, such as pugilism, are not now the fashion."

The "Corinthian ideal" of the gentleman amateur developed alongside muscular Christianity in late Victorian Britain, and has been analysed as a historical social phenomenon since the later 20th century. The Corinthian Football Club founded in 1882 was the paragon of this. In the United States, "Corinthian" came to be applied in particular to amateur yachtsmen, and remains current as such and in the name of many yacht clubs; including Seawanhaka Corinthian Yacht Club (founded 1874, added "Corinthian" to the name in 1881) and Yale Corinthian Yacht Club (likewise 1881 and 1893).

== Present day ==
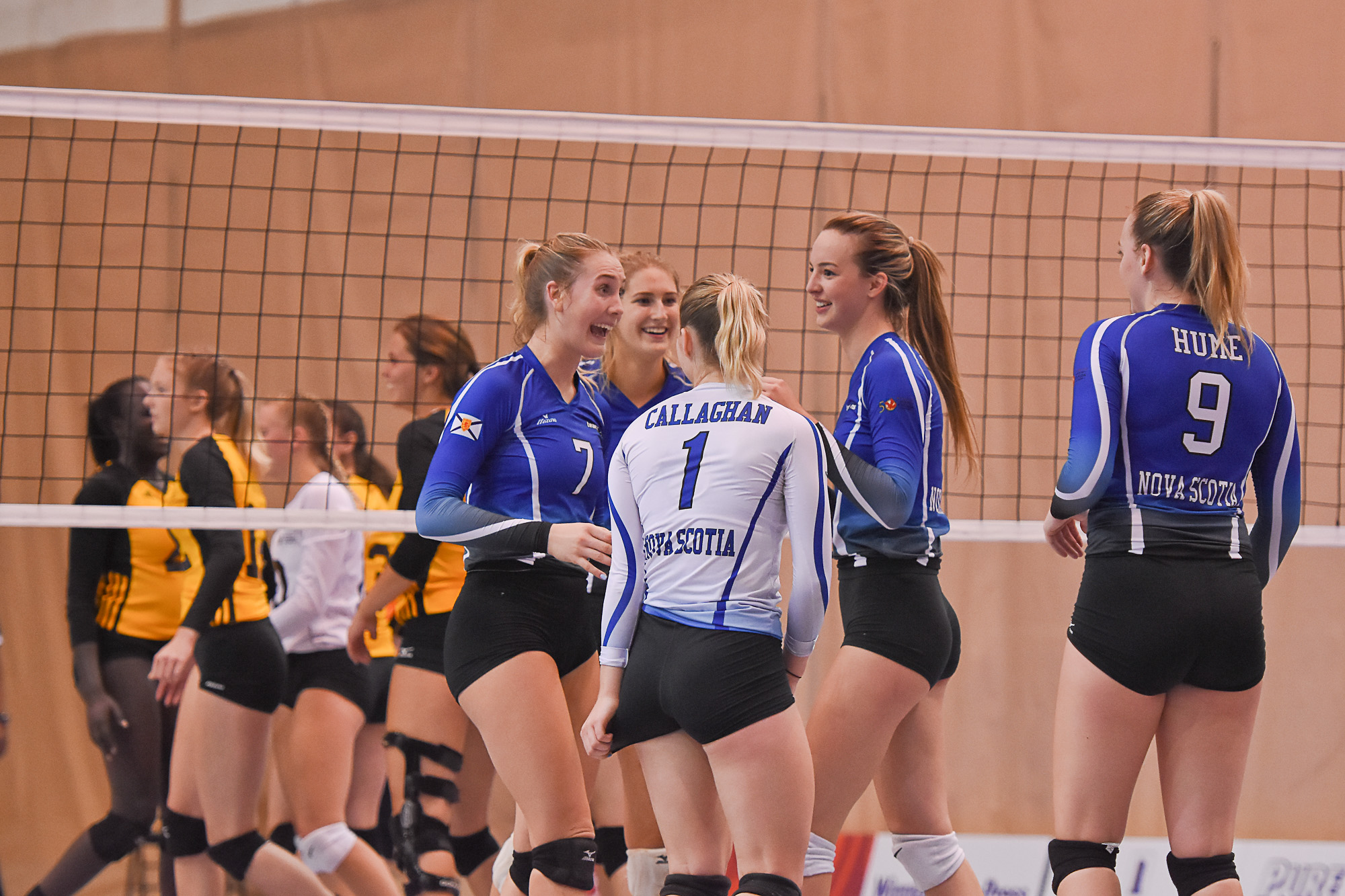
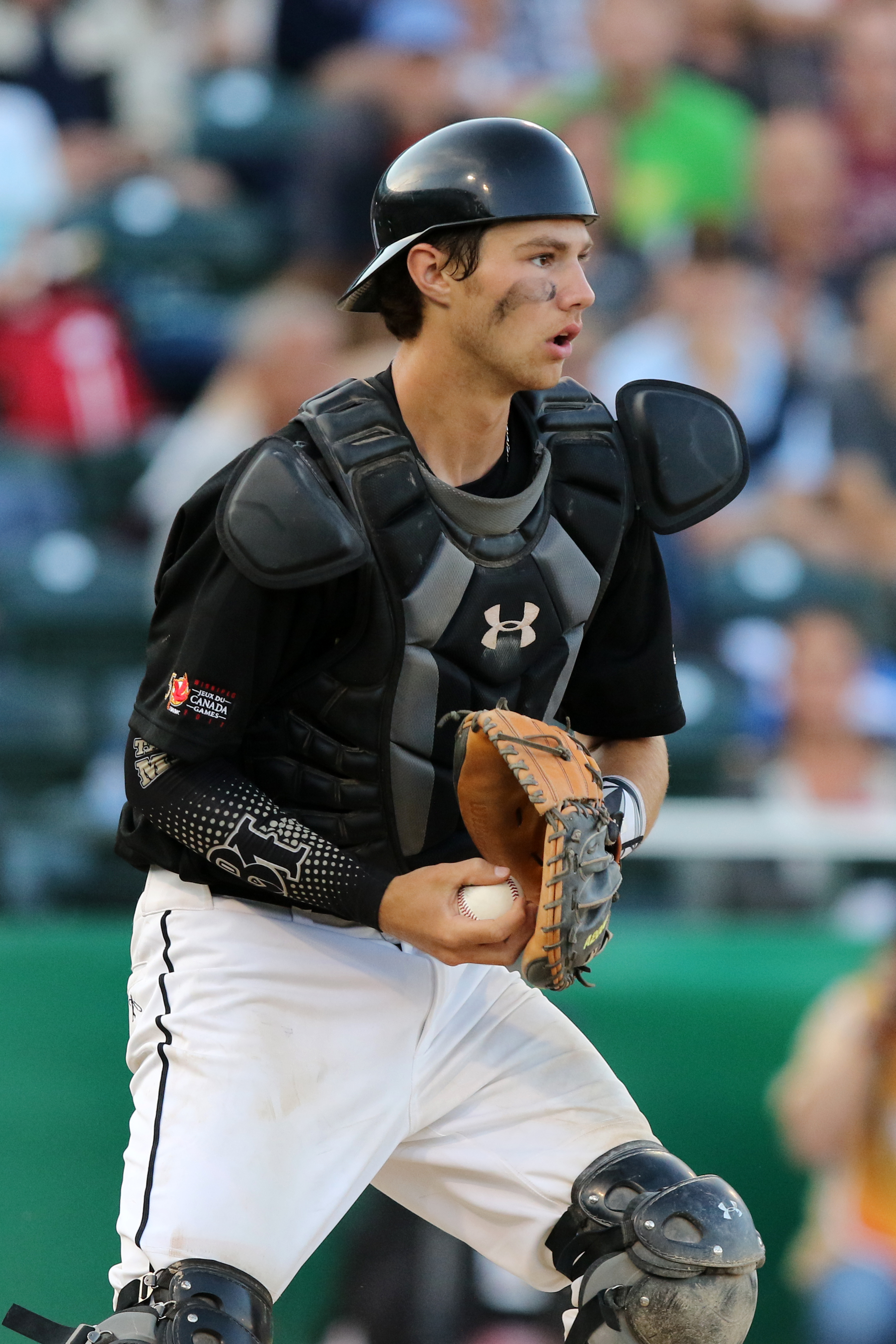
Women's volleyball (left) and Men's Baseball (right) at Canada Summer Games, 2017.

By the early 21st century, the Olympic Games and all the major team sports accepted professional competitors. However, there are still some sports which maintain a distinction between amateur and professional status with separate competitive leagues. The most prominent of these are golf and boxing. In particular, only amateur boxers could compete at the Olympics up to 2016.

Problems can arise for amateur sportsmen when sponsors offer to help with an amateur's playing expenses in the hope of striking lucrative endorsement deals with them in case they become professionals at a later date. This practice, dubbed "shamateurism", a portmanteau of sham and amateur, was present as early as in the 19th century. As financial and political stakes in high-level were becoming higher, shamateurism became all the more widespread, reaching its peak in the 1970s and 1980s, when the International Olympic Committee started moving towards acceptance of professional athletes. The advent of the state-sponsored "full-time amateur athlete" of the Eastern Bloc countries further eroded the ideology of the pure amateur, as it put the self-financed amateurs of the Western countries at a disadvantage. The Soviet Union entered teams of athletes who were all nominally students, soldiers, or working in a profession, but many of whom were in reality paid by the state to train on a full-time basis.

== North American collegiate athletics ==
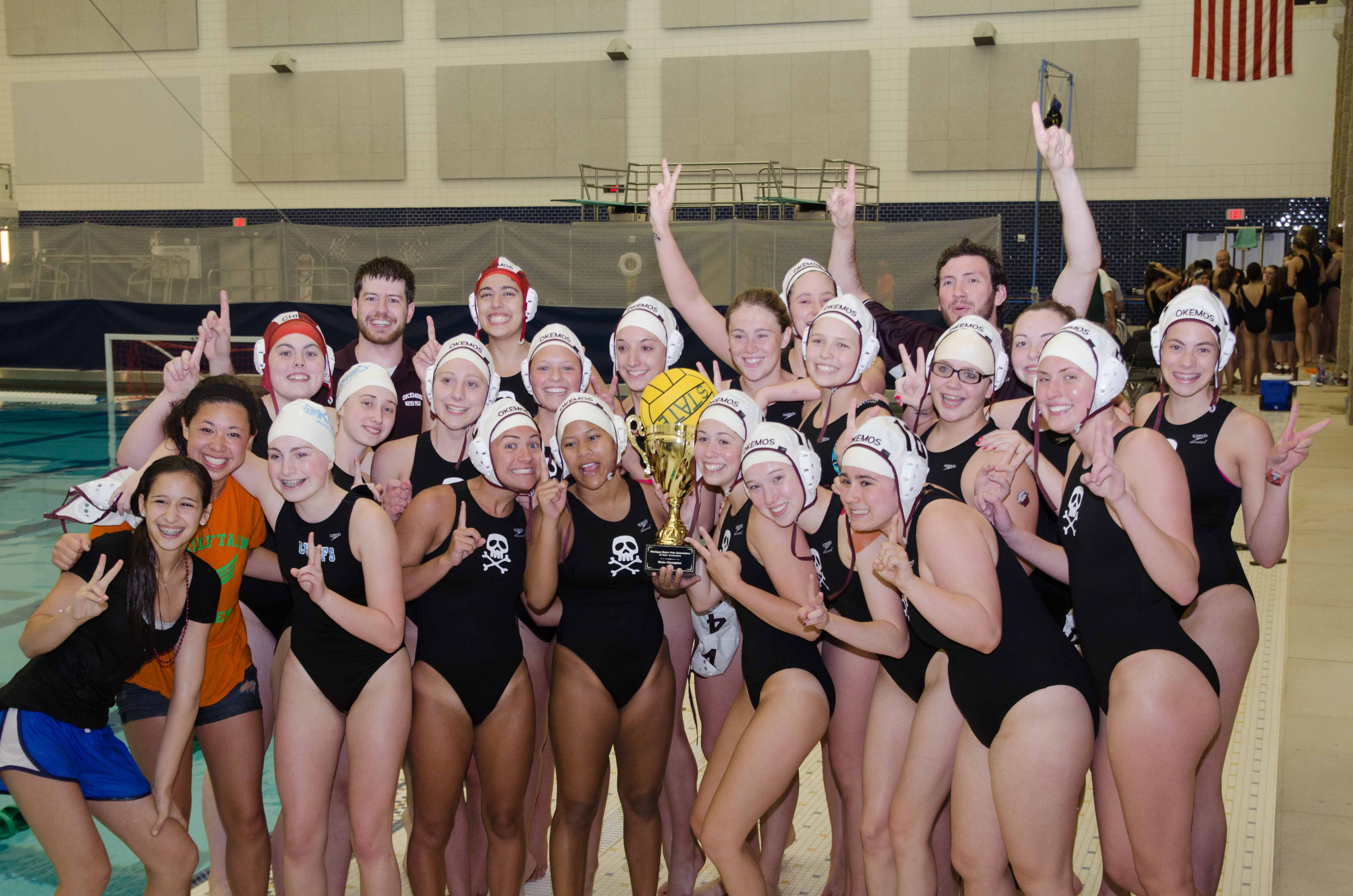
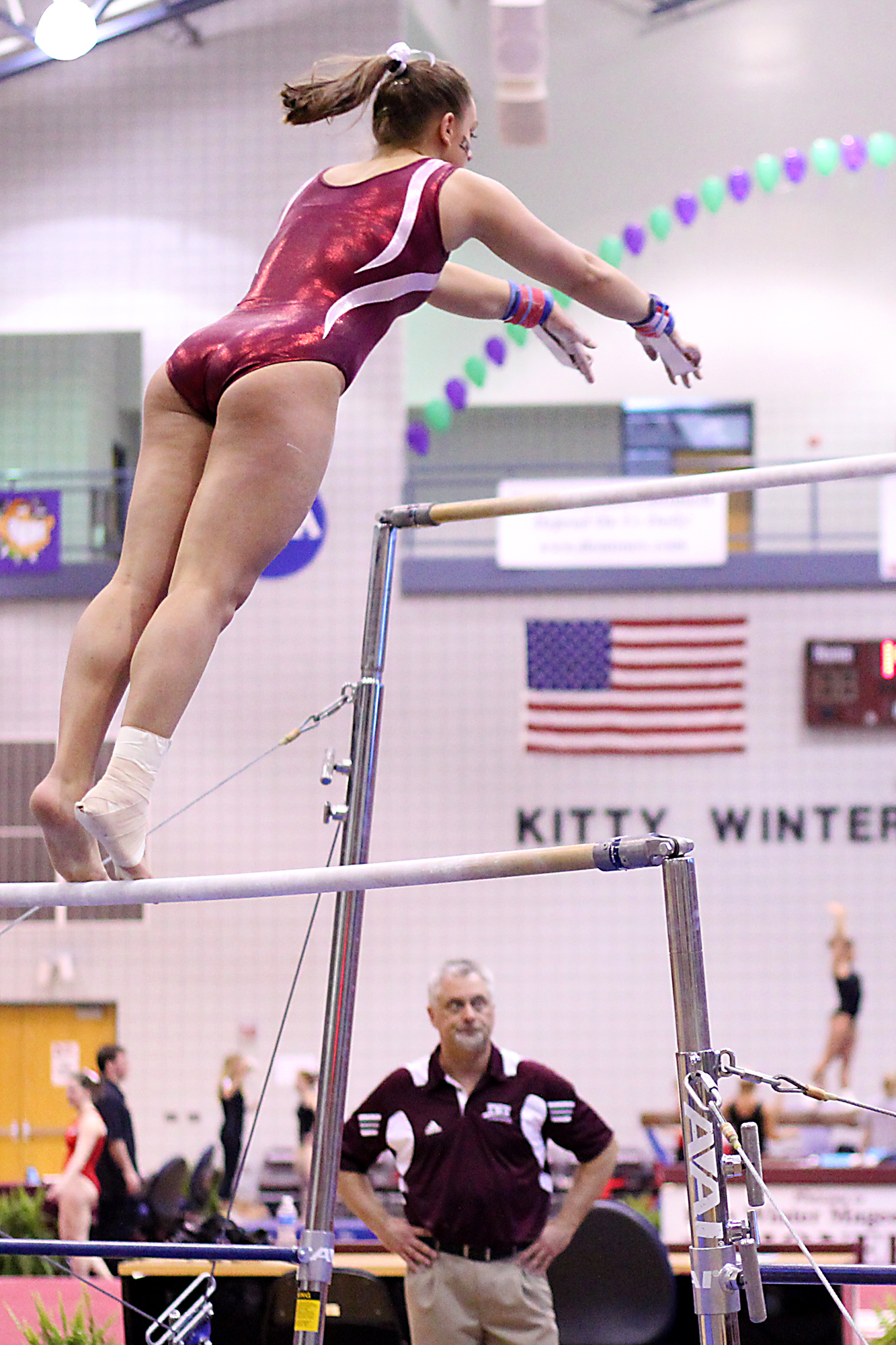
Left: A U.S. high school girls' water polo team (with their male coaches in background) posing with their trophy. Right: A U.S. university girl practising a difficult gymnastics manoeuvre under the watchful eyes of her coach.

All North American university sports are (generally) conducted by amateurs. Even the most commercialized college sports, such as NCAA football and basketball, do not financially compensate competitors, although coaches and trainers generally are paid. College football coaches in Texas and other states are often the highest-paid state employees, with some drawing salaries of over five million US dollars annually. Athletic scholarship programs, unlike academic scholarship programs, cannot cover more than the cost of food, housing, tuition, and other university-related expenses.

In order to ensure that the rules are not circumvented, stringent rules restrict gift-giving during the recruitment process as well as during and even after a collegiate athlete's career; college athletes also cannot endorse products, which some may consider a violation of free speech rights. Former NBA player Jerome Williams says, "For years, student-athletes, especially those from minority communities, have been disadvantaged from monetizing their image, or what we call 'player intellectual property.' There's an ongoing revenue stream college athletes are not a part of."

Some have criticized this system as exploitative; prominent university athletics programs are major commercial endeavors, and can easily rake in millions of dollars in profit during a successful season. College athletes spend a great deal of time "working" for the university, and earn nothing from it at the time aside from scholarships sometimes worth tens of thousands of dollars; basketball and football coaches, meanwhile, earn salaries that can compare with those of professional teams' coaches.

Supporters of the system say that college athletes can always make use of the education they earn as students if their athletic career does not pan out, and that allowing universities to pay college athletes would rapidly lead to deterioration of the already-marginal academic focus of college athletics programs. They also point out that athletic scholarships allow many young men and women who would otherwise be unable to afford to go to college, or would not be accepted, to get a quality education. Also, most sports other than football and men's basketball do not generate significant revenue for any school (and such teams are often essentially funded by football, basketball, and donations), so it may not be possible to pay athletes in all sports. Allowing pay in some sports but not others could result in the violation of U.S. laws such as Title IX.

== Olympics ==
Through most of the 20th century the Olympics allowed only amateur athletes to participate and this amateur code was strictly enforced – Jim Thorpe was stripped of track and field medals for having taken expense money for playing baseball in 1912.

Later on, the nations of the Communist Bloc entered teams of Olympians who were all nominally students, soldiers, or working in a profession, but many of whom were in reality paid by the state to train on a full-time basis.

Near the end of the 1960s, the Canadian Amateur Hockey Association (CAHA) felt their amateur players could no longer be competitive against the Soviet team's full-time athletes and the other constantly improving European teams. They pushed for the ability to use players from professional leagues but met opposition from the International Ice Hockey Federation (IIHF) and the International Olympic Committee (IOC). At the IIHF Congress in 1969, the IIHF decided to allow Canada to use nine non-NHL professional hockey players at the 1970 World Championships in Montreal and Winnipeg, Manitoba, Canada. The decision was reversed in January 1970 after IOC President Avery Brundage said that ice hockey's status as an Olympic sport would be in jeopardy if the change was made. In response, Canada withdrew from all international ice hockey competitions and officials stated that they would not return until "open competition" was instituted. Günther Sabetzki became president of the IIHF in 1975 and helped to resolve the dispute with the CAHA. In 1976, the IIHF agreed to allow "open competition" between all players in the World Championships. However, NHL players were still not allowed to play in the Olympics, because of the unwillingness of the NHL to take a break mid-season and the IOC's amateur-only policy.

Before the 1984 Winter Olympics, a dispute formed over what made a player a professional. The IOC had adopted a rule that made any player who had signed an NHL contract but played less than ten games in the league eligible. However, the United States Olympic Committee maintained that any player contracted with an NHL team was a professional and therefore not eligible to play. The IOC held an emergency meeting that ruled NHL-contracted players were eligible, as long as they had not played in any NHL games. This made five players on Olympic rosters—one Austrian, two Italians and two Canadians—ineligible. Players who had played in other professional leagues – such as the World Hockey Association – were allowed to play. Canadian hockey official Alan Eagleson stated that the rule was only applied to the NHL and that professionally contracted players in European leagues were still considered amateurs. Murray Costello of the CAHA suggested that a Canadian withdrawal was possible. In 1986, the IOC voted to allow all athletes to compete in Olympic Games starting in 1988, but let the individual sport federations decide if they wanted to allow professionals.

After the 1972 retirement of IOC President Avery Brundage, the Olympic amateurism rules were steadily relaxed, amounting only to technicalities and lip service, until being completely abandoned in the 1990s (In the United States, the Amateur Sports Act of 1978 prohibits national governing bodies from having more stringent standards of amateur status than required by international governing bodies of respective sports. The act caused the breakup of the Amateur Athletic Union as a wholesale sports governing body at the Olympic level).

Olympic regulations regarding amateur status of athletes were eventually abandoned in the 1990s with the exception of wrestling, where the amateur fight rules are used due to the fact that professional wrestling is largely staged with pre-determined outcomes. Starting from the 2016 Summer Olympics, professionals were allowed to compete in boxing, though amateur fight rules are still used for the tournament.

== Cricket ==
=== England ===
English first-class cricket distinguished between amateur and professional cricketers until 1963. Teams below Test cricket level in England were normally, except in emergencies such as injuries, captained by amateurs. Notwithstanding this, sometimes there were ways found to give high performing "amateurs", for example W.G. Grace, financial and other compensation such as employment.

On English overseas tours, some of which in the 19th century were arranged and led by professional cricketer-promoters such as James Lillywhite, Alfred Shaw and Arthur Shrewsbury, a more pragmatic approach generally prevailed.

In England the division was reflected in, and for a long time reinforced by, the series of Gentlemen v Players matches between amateurs and professionals. Few cricketers changed their status, but there were some notable exceptions such as Wally Hammond who became (or was allowed to become) an amateur in 1938 so that he could captain England. Hammond was an example of "shamateurism", in that he was offered a "job" which paid more than he earned as a professional cricketer to act as a company's representative and play cricket. Amateurs touring abroad could claim more in expenses than professionals were paid. M.J.K. Smith was a well-salaried secretary – and an amateur captain – of Warwickshire County Cricket Club. Trevor Bailey at Essex and Reg Simpson at Nottinghamshire were in a similar situation.

Professionals were often expected to address amateurs, at least to their faces, as "Mister" or "Sir" whereas the amateurs often referred to professionals by their surnames. Newspaper reports often prefaced amateurs' names with "Mr" while professionals were referred to by surname, or sometimes surname and initials. At some grounds amateurs and professionals had separate dressing rooms and entered the playing arena through separate gates.

An anecdote narrated by Fred Root epitomises the difference between amateurs and professionals: In a match against Glamorgan, the batsmen, Arnold Dyson and Eddie Bates, had collided mid-pitch, and the ball was returned to Root, the bowler. Root did not break the stumps as both batsmen seemed injured. An amateur repeatedly shouted "Break the wicket, Fred, break the wicket!" until Root said: "If you want to run him out, here's the ball: you come and do it." The amateur responded with the words "Oh, I'm an amateur. I can't do such a thing."

After the Second World War the division was increasingly questioned. When Len Hutton was appointed as English national cricket captain in 1952 he remained a professional. In 1962 the division was removed, and all cricket players became known as "cricketers".

=== Other countries ===
In Australia the amateur-professional division was rarely noticed in the years before World Series Cricket, as many top-level players expected to receive something for their efforts on the field: before World War I profit-sharing of tour proceeds was common. Australian cricketers touring England were considered amateurs and given the title "Mr" in newspaper reports.

Before the Partition of India some professionalism developed, but talented cricketers were often employed by wealthy princely or corporate patrons and thus retained a notional amateur status.

Women's cricket has always been almost entirely amateur; however, the recent popularity of women's sport has seen many top-level female cricketers become fully professional, with top international players earning up to $300,000 before endorsements and franchise contracts.

== Association football ==
=== United Kingdom ===
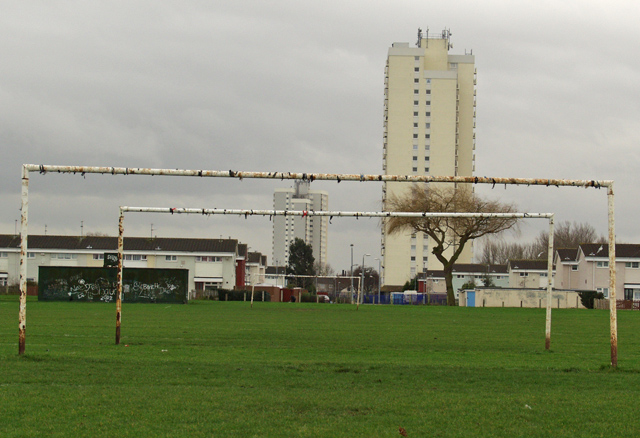
Public football pitches are common in residential areas, such as this pitch on the Orchard Park Estate, Kingston upon Hull, England.

Boot money has been a phenomenon in amateur sport for centuries. The term "boot money" became popularised in the 1880s when it was not unusual for players to find half a crown (corresponding to 12 1/2 pence after decimalisation) in their boots after a game.

The Football Association prohibited paying players until 1885, and this is referred to as the "legalisation" of professionalism because it was an amendment of the "Laws of the Game". However, a maximum salary cap of £12 per week for a player with outside employment and £15 per week for a player with no outside employment lingered until the 1960s, even as transfer fees reached over a hundred thousand pounds; again, "boot money" was seen as a way of topping up pay.

Today, the most prominent English football clubs that are not professional are semi-professional (paying part-time players more than the old maximum for top professionals). Until 2019, when it abandoned amateur status, the most prominent true amateur men's club was probably Queen's Park, the oldest football club in Scotland, founded in 1867 and with a home ground (Hampden Park) which is one of UEFA's five-star stadia. They have also won the Scottish Cup more times than any club outside the Old Firm. Amateur football in both genders is now found mainly in small village and Sunday clubs and the Amateur Football Alliance.

=== Soviet Union ===
A peculiar situation took place in the Soviet Union which had Soviet-type economic planning in the country and no non-state enterprises were permitted. In 1936 the government agency for sports adopted a decision to form competitions for "teams of [football] masters", while at the republican level there were separate competitions among teams from factories and government agencies—players were officially on the payrolls of those institutions. In this way athletes were officially getting paid as workers or officials. Athletes of the Soviet Armed Forces Sports Society or Dynamo Sports Club (NKVD sports society) carried a rank and a uniform. The difference between the teams of masters and other teams was that the first competed at the all-Union level and was considered non-amateur, while those at the republican level were considered to be amateur. The preceding football competitions among cities and regions were phased away.

== Sailing ==
Around the turn of the 20th century, much of sailing was professionals paid by interested idle rich. Today, sailing, especially dinghy sailing, is an example of a sport which is still largely populated by amateurs. For example, in the recent Team Racing Worlds, and the American Team Racing Nationals, most of the sailors competing in the event were amateurs. While many competitive sailors are employed in businesses related to sailing (including sailmaking, naval architecture, boatbuilding and coaching), most are not compensated for their own competitions. In large keelboat racing, such as the Volvo Around the World Race and the America's Cup, this amateur spirit has given way in recent years to large corporate sponsorships and paid crews.

== Figure skating ==
Like other Olympic sports, figure skating used to have very strict amateur status rules. Over the years, these rules were relaxed to allow competitive skaters to receive token payments for performances in exhibitions (amid persistent rumors that they were receiving more money "under the table"), then to accept money for professional activities such as endorsements provided that the payments were made to trust funds rather than to the skaters themselves.

In 1992, trust funds were abolished, and the International Skating Union voted both to remove most restrictions on amateurism, and to allow skaters who had previously lost their amateur status to apply for reinstatement of their eligibility. A number of skaters, including Brian Boitano, Katarina Witt, Jayne Torvill and Christopher Dean, and Ekaterina Gordeeva and Sergei Grinkov, took advantage of the reinstatement rule to compete at the 1994 Winter Olympics. However, when all of these skaters promptly returned to the pro circuit again, the ISU decided the reinstatement policy was a failure and it was discontinued in 1995.

Prize money at ISU competitions was introduced in 1995, paid by the sale of the television rights to those events. In addition to prize money, Olympic-eligible skaters may also earn money through appearance fees at shows and competitions, endorsements, movie and television contracts, coaching, and other "professional" activities, provided that their activities are approved by their national federations. The only activity that is strictly forbidden by the ISU is participating in unsanctioned "pro" competitions, which the ISU uses to maintain their monopoly status as the governing body in the sport.

Many people in the skating world still use "turning pro" as jargon to mean retiring from competitive skating, even though most top competitive skaters are already full-time professionals, and many skaters who retire from competition to concentrate on show skating or coaching do not actually lose their competition eligibility in the process.

== Rugby football ==
=== Background ===
Rugby has provided one of the most visible and lasting examples of the tension between amateurism and professionalism during the development of nationally organised sports in Britain in the late-19th century. The split in rugby in 1895 between what became rugby league and rugby union arose as a direct result of a dispute over the pretence of a strict enforcement of its amateur status – clubs in Leeds and Bradford were fined after compensating players for missing work, whilst at the same time the Rugby Football Union (RFU) was allowing other players to be paid.

Rugby football, despite its origins in the privileged English public schools, was a popular game throughout England by around 1880, including in the large working-class areas of the industrial north. However, as the then-amateur sport became increasingly popular and competitive, attracting large paying crowds, teams in such areas found it difficult to attract and retain good players. This was because physically fit local men needed to both work to earn a wage – limiting the time that they could devote to unpaid sport – and to avoid injuries that might prevent them working in the future. Certain teams faced with these circumstances wanted to pay so-called 'broken time' money to their players to compensate them for missing paid work due to their playing commitments, but this contravened the amateur policy of the Rugby Football Union (RFU).

=== Organization ===
Following a lengthy dispute on this point during the early 1890s, representatives of more than 20 prominent northern rugby clubs met in Huddersfield in August 1895 to form the Northern Rugby Football Union (NRFU), a breakaway administrative body which would permit payments to be made to players. The NRFU initially adopted established RFU rules for the game itself, but soon introduced a number of changes, most obviously a switch from 15 to 13 players per side. It became the Rugby Football League in 1922, by which time the key differences in the two codes were well established, with the 13-a-side variant becoming known as rugby league.

The RFU took strong action against the clubs involved in the formation of the NRFU, all of whom were deemed to have forfeited their amateur status and therefore to have left the RFU. A similar interpretation was applied to all players who played either for or against such clubs, whether or not they themselves received any compensation. Such players were effectively barred sine die from any involvement in organised rugby union. These comprehensive and enduring sanctions, combined with the very localised nature of most rugby competition, meant that most northern clubs had little practical alternative but to affiliate with the NRFU in the first few years of its existence.

Rugby football in Britain therefore became subject to a de facto schism along regional – and to some extent class – lines, reflecting the historical origins of the split. Rugby league – in which professionalism was permitted – was predominant in northern England, particularly in industrial areas, and was viewed as a working class game. Rugby union – which remained amateur – was predominant in the rest of England, as well as in Wales and Scotland. Rugby union also had a more affluent reputation, although there are areas – notably in South Wales and in certain English cities such as Gloucester – with a strong working-class rugby union tradition.

=== Discrimination ===
Discrimination against rugby league players could verge on the petty – former Welsh international Fred Perrett was once excluded in lists of players who died in the First World War due to his 'defection' to the league code. One Member of Parliament, David Hinchliffe, described it as "one of the longest (and daftest) grievances in history" with anyone over the age of 18 associated with rugby league being banned forever from rugby union.

=== Scotland and Wales ===
The Scottish Rugby Union was a particular bastion of amateurism and extreme care was taken to avoid the 'taint' of professionalism: a player rejoining the national team after the end of the Second World War applied to be issued with a new shirt and was reminded that he had been supplied with a shirt prior to the outbreak of hostilities.

In Wales the position was more equivocal with clubs attempting to stem the tide of players going north with boot money, a reference to the practice of putting cash payments into player's footwear whilst they were cleaning up after a game. Sometimes payments were substantial. Barry John was once asked why he hadn't turned professional and responded, "I couldn't afford to."

=== Open union ===
Rugby union was declared "open" in August 1995 – almost exactly 100 years after the original split occurred – meaning that professionalism has been permitted in both rugby codes since that date. However, while the professional-amateur divide remained in force, there was originally very limited crossover between the two codes, the most obvious occasions being when top-class rugby union players 'switched codes' to rugby league in order to play professionally. Welsh international Jonathan Davies was a high-profile example of this switch. Since professionalism has been allowed in rugby union the switches have started to come the opposite way. Union has swiftly grown to embrace the professional game with many league players joining union to take a slice of the larger amounts of money available in the sport.

Nowadays, while rugby union no longer makes the professional-amateur distinction, the professional-amateur split still exists within rugby league with the British Amateur Rugby League Association (BARLA) strictly amateur, though it allows some ex-professionals to play provided they are no longer under contract. The most recent club to get a ban for fielding a contracted professional was Brighouse Rangers who were expelled from the National Conference League during 2007–2008 season, and the player handed a sine die ban (though in part for gouging), although the club itself has since been admitted to the Pennine League.

Also, some rugby unions have amateur rules, most notably the Argentine Rugby Union, where all member clubs are amateur. The Campeonato Argentino, the national championship for provincial teams, does not include players contracted to the country's Super Rugby side, the Jaguares.

== Ultimate and disc sports (Frisbee) ==
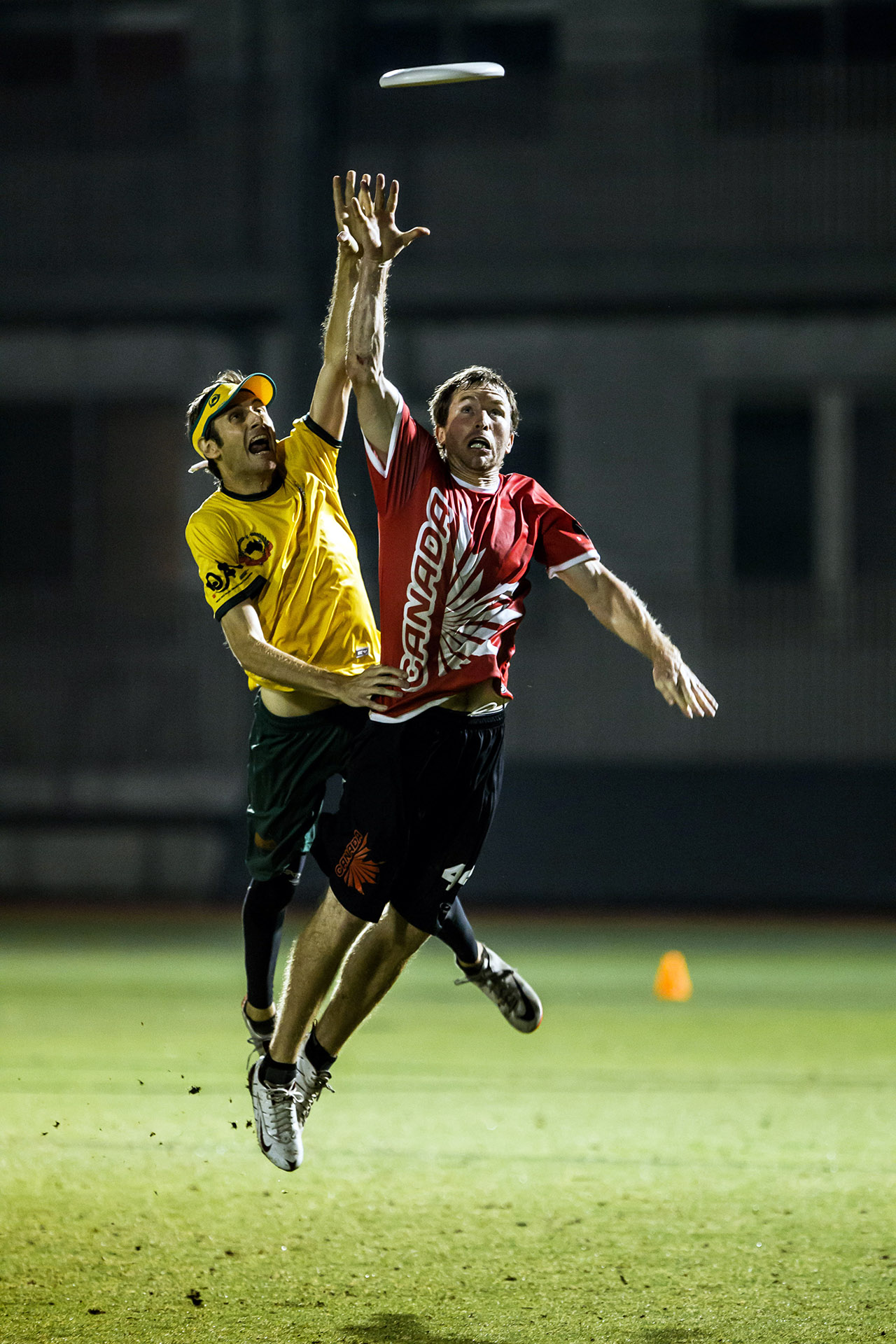
Australia vs Canada, ultimate players at the 2012 WUGC in Japan. Ultimate Canada

Alternative sports, using the flying disc, began in the mid-sixties. As numbers of young people became alienated from social norms, they resisted and looked for alternative recreational activities, including that of throwing a Frisbee. What started with a few players, in the sixties, like Victor Malafronte, Z Weyand and Ken Westerfield experimenting with new ways of throwing and catching a Frisbee, later would become known as playing freestyle. Organized disc sports, in the 1970s, began with promotional efforts from Wham-O and Irwin Toy (Canada), a few tournaments and professionals using Frisbee show tours to perform at universities, fairs and sporting events. Disc sports such as freestyle, double disc court, guts, disc ultimate and disc golf became this sports first events. Two sports, the team sport of disc ultimate and disc golf are very popular worldwide and are now being played semi professionally. The World Flying Disc Federation, Professional Disc Golf Association, and the Freestyle Players Association, are the official rules and sanctioning organizations for flying disc sports worldwide.

Disc ultimate is a team sport played with a flying disc. The object of the game is to score points by passing the disc to members of your own team, on a rectangular field, 120 yards (110 m) by 40 yards (37 m), until you have successfully completed a pass to a team member in the opposing team's end zone. There are currently over five million people that play some form of organized ultimate in the US. Ultimate has started to be played semi-professionally with two newly formed leagues, the American Ultimate Disc League (AUDL) and Major League Ultimate (MLU).

The game of guts was invented by the Healy Brothers in the 1950s and developed at the International Frisbee Tournament (IFT) in Marquette, Michigan. The game of ultimate, the most widely played disc game, began in the late 1960s with Joel Silver and Jared Kass. In the 1970s it developed as an organized sport with the creation of the Ultimate Players Association with Dan Roddick, Tom Kennedy and Irv Kalb. Double disc court was invented and introduced in the early 1970s by Jim Palmeri. In 1974, freestyle competition was created and introduced by Ken Westerfield and Discrafts Jim Kenner. In 1976, the game of disc golf was standardized with targets called "pole holes" invented and developed by Wham-O's Ed Headrick.

== High school sports ==
Sports teams commonly exist at the high school level. Those who participate, commonly referred to as student athletes, do so during their course of study.

In the United States, each state has one or two high school sports associations, which are members of the National Federation of State High School Associations. Over 7 million high school students participate in athletics every year. Occasionally, success in high school sports may lead to a professional career in the field.

The benefit of sports in high school is debated; some believe that they promote discipline and teamwork, while others find that they can cause injury. One study on the relationship between high school athletic and academic successes finds that, for the most part, higher participation and success rates in sports is positively related school-wide student successes on academic outcomes such as standardized test scores and educational attainment. The National Center for Educational Statistics reports that student athletes have a 20% higher chance of completing a college degree, and are more likely to be employed and in better health than non-athletes. However, a survey of high school athletes in 2006 showed that high school athletes are more likely to cheat inside of the classroom than non-athletes, especially boys participating in football, baseball, and basketball and girls participating in softball and basketball. The survey does not indicate to what extent cheating contributes to the greater academic outcomes of high school athletes.

In the world of middle school and high school sports, several fees have risen over the last few years making sports more expensive. The term "Pay-to-Play" means that students and their parents must pay a flat fee to participate, and that fee often leaves out the costs of uniforms, transportation, and other team fees. This affects low-income families (those who earn less than $60,000 per year) and their ability to participate in the sports. The average cost is $381 per child per sport (Pay-to-Play Sports). Physical and mental health can improve with the right amount of physical fitness incorporated into everyday life. It allows for the child to have a healthy developing body, and a BMI within the normal range. Physical activity has been proven to improve mood and decrease both stress and anxiety. Studies have shown that the more physical activity one participates in as a child, the happier and more stable that person will be as an adult. Thus, the more students who participate in school sports, the more students who will find themselves balanced and successful adults later in life.

In Japan, extracurricular sports activities known as bukatsudo (部活動, club activities) and high school sports are extremely popular.

In Japan, National High-school Baseball Tournament of Japan (全日本高等学校野球選手権), which highest of amateur sports of the Japan and world, that one of very interest in sports item for Japan, when held on every August, and also regional primary event held in every July on nationwide Japan. This tournament was first Introduced in 1914.

See also High School Baseball (ja:高校野球). For Japanese soccer, see High School Soccer (ja:高校サッカー). For Japanese high school sports in general, see Club Activities (ja:クラブ活動).

== Golf ==
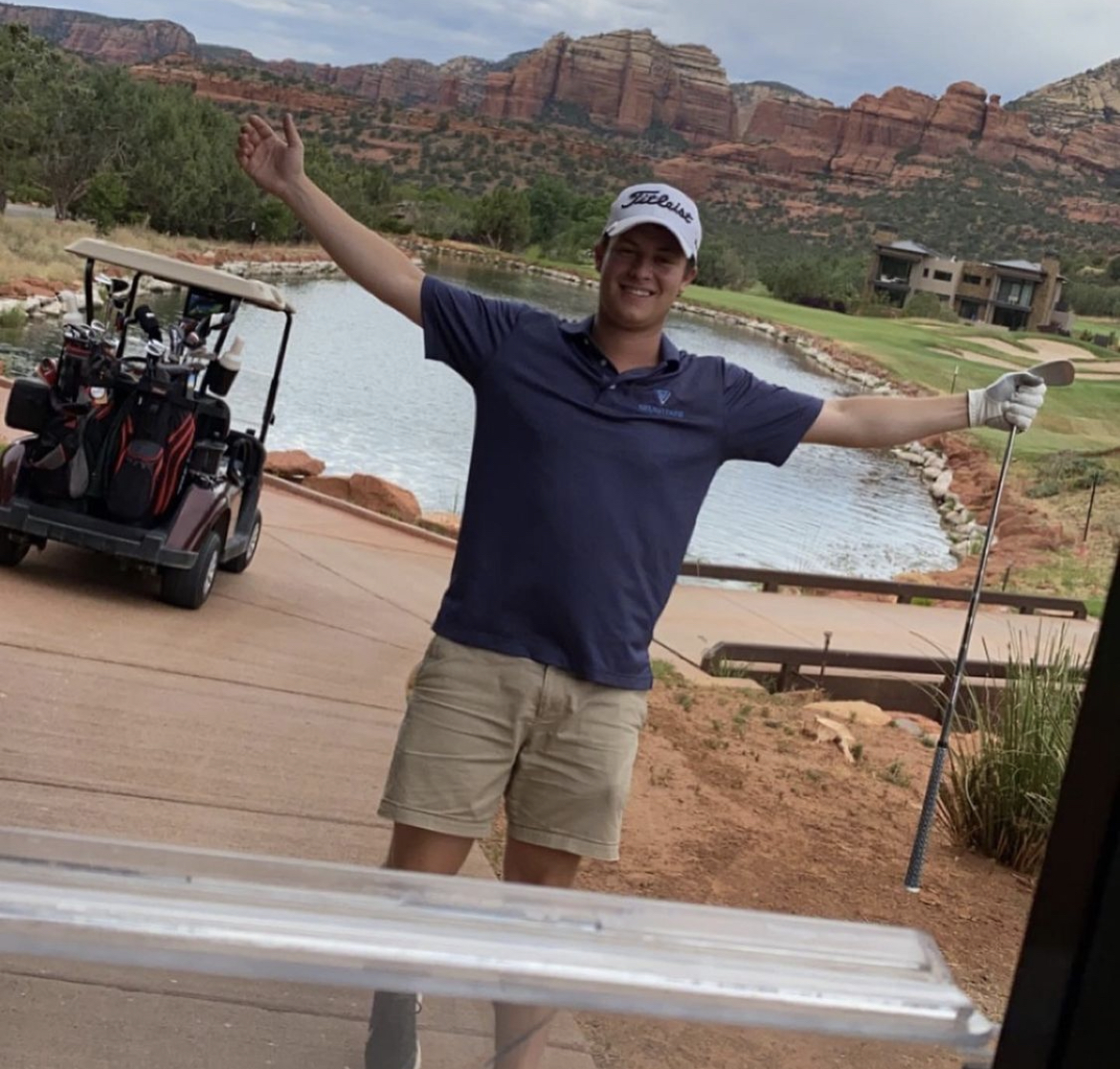
An amateur golfer celebrates his first hole-in-one.

Golf still has amateur championships, most notably the U.S. Amateur Championship, British Amateur Championship, U.S. Women's Amateur, British Ladies Amateur, Walker Cup, Eisenhower Trophy, Curtis Cup and Espirito Santo Trophy. However, amateur golfers are far less known than players of professional golf tours such as the PGA Tour and European Tour. Still, a few amateurs are invited to compete in open events, such as the U.S. Open and British Open or non-open event, such as the Masters Tournament. Amateur golfers that win open tournaments may receive a trophy but are not entitled to any prize money above £700.

== Motorsport ==
In motorsports, there are various forms of amateur drivers. When they compete at professional events, they are often referred to as "pay drivers". They have been a presence in Formula One for many years – drivers such as Felipe Nasr, Esteban Gutiérrez and Rio Haryanto bring sponsorship to the tune of $30 million for a seat, even in backmarker teams. In sports car racing, drivers are often seeded into certain categories, including Amateur and Pro-Am classes. The vast majority of these "gentlemen drivers" however tend to participate at club level, often racing historic or classic cars, which are aimed primarily at amateurs.

== Other sports ==
In Ireland, the Gaelic Athletic Association, or GAA, protects the amateur status of the country's national sports, including Gaelic football, hurling and camogie. The GAA sees Croke Park, with a capacity of 82,300 people, filled for the Senior Football and Hurling Championship finals. Major tennis championships prohibited professionals until 1968, but the subsequent admission of professionals virtually eliminated amateurs from public visibility. Paying players was considered disreputable in baseball until 1869.

== See also ==
- Cheerleading
- Professional sports
- Semi-professional sports
- History of English amateur cricket
- Boot money scandal
- History of rugby union
- History of rugby league
- Athletic director
- Pick-up game
- High performance sport
- Youth sports

== Bibliography ==
- Podnieks, Andrew; Szemberg, Szymon (2007). World of hockey : celebrating a century of the IIHF. Fenn Publishing. ISBN 9781551683072.
