= Corinthian Sailing Club =

Yacht club in Dallas, Texas, US

- Burgee
- Short name: CSC
- Founded: 1939
- Location: 441 E. Lawther Drive, Dallas, Texas
- Website: www.cscsailing.org

The Corinthian Sailing Club is a private yacht club located in Dallas, Texas, on the shore of White Rock Lake (United States).

== History ==
CSC was formally incorporated in June 1939 by Tom Nash, Frank Parker and Wilfred Bruce. It was the third club to be established at White Rock Lake. Dallas Sailing Club (DSC) had been chartered in 1928, and in 1935 eleven Snipe sailors left DSC and formed the West Shore Sailing Club, changing the name to White Rock Sailing Club (WRSC) that same year. Snipe Fleet 1 moved from DSC to WRSC. The Snipe sailors, and Snipe Fleet number 1, moved from WRSC to CSC in 1993.

In the beginning Snipes were the primary boats at CSC, although CSC members were also racing Seagulls and Lightnings in the early 1940s. Lightning Fleet 35 was organized in 1940, the Y flyer fleet in the 1950s, Rebel Fleet 24 in 1960, and Flying Scot Fleet 23 followed in the early 1960s. Lone Star 13 and Corinthian fleets were chartered as Fleet number 1 by their classes, as had the Snipe earlier.

== Fleets ==
At the present time there are the following One-Design fleets:

- Butterfly
- Corinthian 19
- Pearson Ensign
- Flying Scot
- Laser
- Optimist
- Snipe
- Vanguard 15

== Awards ==
CSC received the St. Petersburg Yacht Club Trophy from US Sailing in 1986 after hosting the National Team Racing Championship (Hinman Trophy) and in 2012 after hosting the Championship of Champions (Jack Brown Trophy).
