= Bristol 29.9 =

Sailboat class

Development
- Designer: Halsey Chase Herreshoff
- Location: United States
- Year: 1977
- No. built: 216
- Builder: Bristol Yachts
- Name: Bristol 29.9

Boat
- Displacement: 8,650 lb (3,924 kg)
- Draft: 4.33 ft (1.32 m)

Hull
- Type: Monohull
- Construction: Fiberglass
- LOA: 29.92 ft (9.12 m)
- LWL: 24.00 ft (7.32 m)
- Beam: 10.17 ft (3.10 m)
- Engine: Universal Atomic 4 15 hp (11 kW) gasoline engine

Hull appendages
- Keel: fin keel
- Ballast: 3,600 lb (1,633 kg)
- Rudder: skeg-mounted rudder

Rig
- Rig type: Bermuda rig
- I foretriangle height: 37.50 ft (11.43 m)
- J foretriangle base: 11.25 ft (3.43 m)
- P mainsail luff: 32.00 ft (9.75 m)
- E mainsail foot: 11.25 ft (3.43 m)

Sails
- Sailplan: Masthead sloop
- Mainsail area: 180.00 sq ft (16.723 m^{2})
- Jib/genoa area: 210.94 sq ft (19.597 m^{2})
- Total sail area: 390.94 sq ft (36.320 m^{2})

Racing
- Class association: MORC
- PHRF: 193 (average)

The Bristol 29.9 is an American sailboat that was designed by Halsey Chase Herreshoff as a Midget Offshore Racing Class and International Offshore Rule racer and first built in 1977.

== Production ==
The design was built between 1977 and 1986 by Bristol Yachts in Bristol, Rhode Island, United States, but it is now out of production. Total production was 216 examples.

== Design ==
The Bristol 29.9 is a recreational keelboat, built predominantly of fiberglass, with wood trim. It has a masthead sloop rig, a spooned raked stem, a vertical transom, a skeg-mounted rudder controlled by a wheel and a fixed fin keel or optionally, a stub keel and centerboard. It displaces 8,650 lb (3,924 kg) and carries 3,600 lb (1,633 kg) of lead ballast.

The keel-equipped version of the boat has a draft of 4.33 ft (1.32 m), while the centerboard-equipped version has a draft of 7.5 ft (2.3 m) with the centerboard extended and 3.5 ft (1.1 m) with it retracted.

A taller rig for use in areas with lighter winds was an option. The tall mast was about 2.5 ft (0.76 m) taller than standard.

The design was initially fitted with a Universal Atomic 4 gasoline engine, but this was replaced in production by a Yanmar diesel engine of 15 hp (11 kW). Later a Universal diesel engine of 16 hp (12 kW) was used. The fuel tank holds 18 U.S. gallons (68 L; 15 imp gal) and the fresh water tank has a capacity of 63 U.S. gallons (240 L; 52 imp gal).

The boat had two factory cabin layouts that were available, differing in the galley location. Both galley layouts have a stainless steel sink and a two-burner stove. The head has a privacy door and is located forward, just aft of the bow "V"-berth. Additional sleeping space is provided by the dinette settee, a second settee and an aft berth, for a total sleeping accommodation for six people. Interior wood trim is mahogany while the cabin sole is teak.

Ventilation is provided by a scoop-type ventilator forward of the mast, a skylight hatch over the cabin table and a second hatch above the forward cabin. There are ten cabin ports.

The boat has jiffy reefing genoa tracks and four cockpit winches. The mainsheet traveler is mounted on the cabin top.

The design has a PHRF racing average handicap of 193.

== Operational history ==
In a 2005 review in Good Old Boat magazine, writer Karen Larson, described the design, "the 29.9 was designed to race under the International Off-shore Rule (IOR) and Midget Ocean Racing Club (MORC) rules, but people soon realized that it made a better cruiser than racer. At 29 feet 11 inches with a 10-foot 2-inch beam and displacing 8,650 pounds with 3,600 pounds of ballast, it was called “less-than-sprightly” by Practical Sailor."

Jack Hornor, reviewing the design in 2017, in The Spinsheet, noted, "owners report a well mannered boat and general satisfaction with her speed and performance. There is a large rudder that provides a responsive helm and a good sized skeg forward of the rudder for good directional control and to aid in keeping those pesky crab pots off the propeller. I would expect that, with a ballast/displacement ratio of 42%, a relatively wide beam of 10’ 2" and a conservative sail/displacement ratio of 14.8, this is a boat that would stand up to a blow quite well. On the other hand, we sail here on the Chesapeake where summertime winds are often light. I would think a good light air number one genoa would be essential equipment around here."

== See also ==
- List of sailing boat types
