= Starwind 223 =

1980s American recreational keelboat

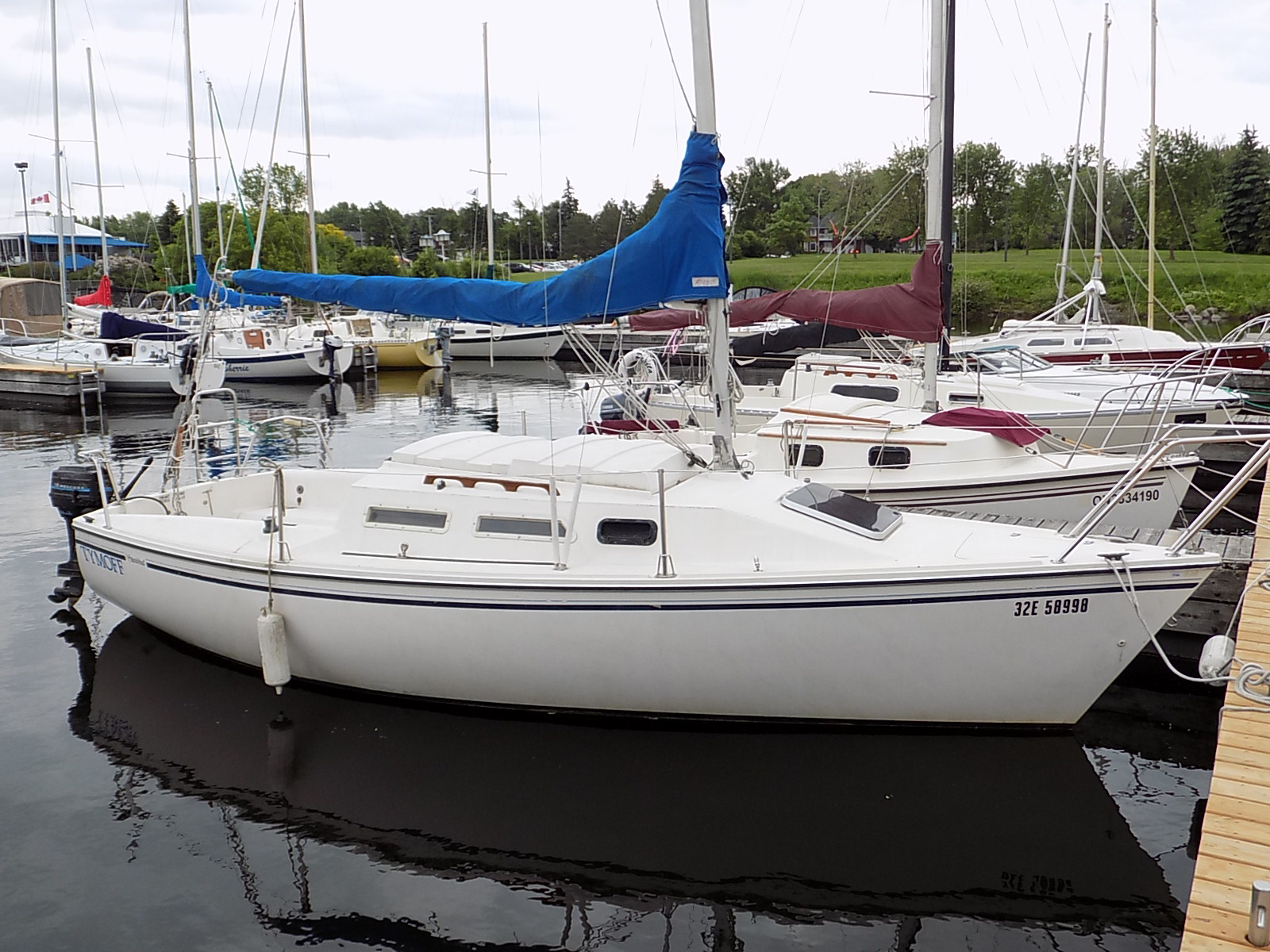

Development
- Designer: Cortland Steck
- Location: United States
- Year: 1982
- Builders: Starwind; Rebel Industries
- Name: Starwind 223

Boat
- Displacement: 2,435 lb (1,104 kg)
- Draft: 5.00 ft (1.52 m) with centerboard down, 1.83 ft (0.56 m) with centerboard up

Hull
- Type: Monohull
- Construction: Fiberglass
- LOA: 22.25 ft (6.78 m)
- LWL: 19.33 ft (5.89 m)
- Beam: 8.50 ft (2.59 m)
- Engine: Outboard motor

Hull appendages
- Keel: Centerboard
- Ballast: 700 lb (318 kg)
- Rudder: transom-mounted rudder

Rig
- Rig type: Bermuda rig
- I foretriangle height: 22.50 ft (6.86 m)
- J foretriangle base: 7.67 ft (2.34 m)
- P mainsail luff: 25.00 ft (7.62 m)
- E mainsail foot: 10.75 ft (3.28 m)

Sails
- Sailplan: Fractional rigged sloop
- Mainsail area: 134.38 sq ft (12.484 m^{2})
- Jib/genoa area: 86.29 sq ft (8.017 m^{2})
- Total sail area: 220.66 sq ft (20.500 m^{2})

Racing
- PHRF: 264 (average)

The Starwind 223 is an American sailboat, that was designed by Cortland Steck and first built in 1984.

== Production ==
The design was built by the Starwind division of Wellcraft Marine Corp in the United States from 1982 to 1984 and then by Rebel Industries near Sarasota, Florida from 1985 to 1987.

== Design ==
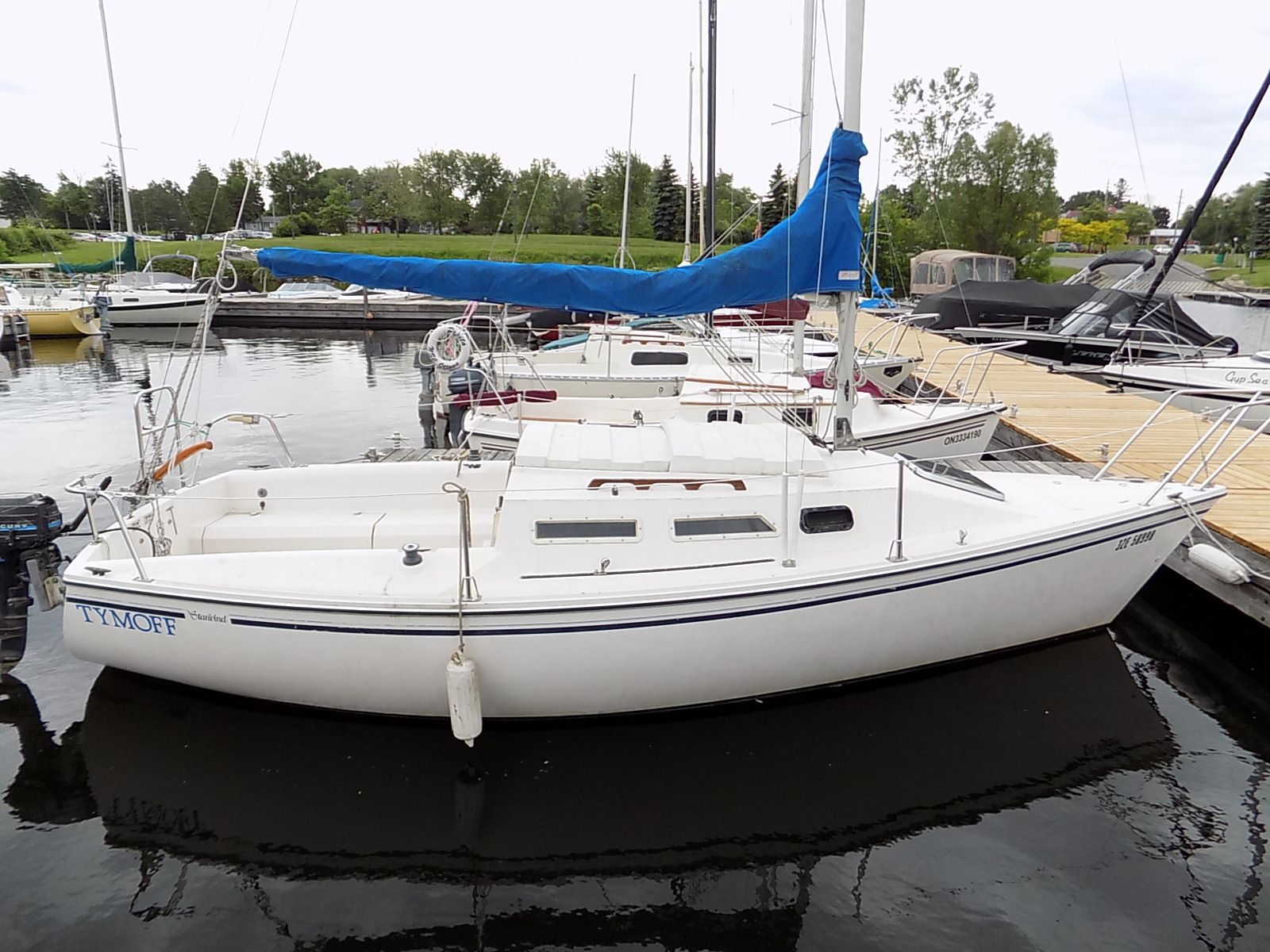
Starwind 223

The Starwind 223 is a small recreational keelboat, built predominantly of fiberglass, with wood trim. It has a fractional sloop rig, a raked stem, a reverse transom, a transom-hung rudder controlled by a tiller and a retractable centerboard keel. It displaces 2,435 lb (1,104 kg) and carries 700 lb (318 kg) of ballast.

The boat has a draft of 5.00 ft (1.52 m) with the centerboard extended and 1.83 ft (0.56 m) with it retracted, allowing ground transportation on a trailer.

The boat is normally fitted with a small 3 to 6 hp (2 to 4 kW) outboard motor for docking and maneuvering.

The design has sleeping accommodation for four people, with a double "V"-berth in the bow cabin and two straight settee berths in the main cabin. The galley is located on the port side just aft of the bow cabin and is equipped with a sink. The head is located in the bow cabin under the "V"-berth. Cabin headroom is 56 in (142 cm).

The design has a PHRF racing average handicap of 264 with a high of 261 and low of 270. It has a hull speed of 5.89 kn (10.91 km/h).

== Operational history ==
In a 2010 review Steve Henkel wrote, "This attractive design ... has plenty of nice features ... and not a lot of faults. Best features: She has the biggest beam and hence the highest Space Index of her competitors. Marks of quality include a well-molded hull of mat, roving, and Coremat, with no chopped strand, a teak-and-holly cabin sole, cedar-lined hanging locker, anchor locker on deck, with a separate rope locker to help avoid tangle, a big Lexan translucent forward hatch for ventilation over the head, a sea hood over the main hatch to help provide watertight integrity, and a dinette table that attaches to either galley below or cockpit on deck. Settee and quarter berths are a generous 7' 9" long, and the wood-bottomed after cushions can be placed between the settees to make a cozy 6' 6" by 4' 4" double 'honeymoon' berth. Worst features: The inboard chainplates make it less easy to go forward on deck, but provide a tighter sheeting angle for the jib, so to most sailors the extra performance upwind is worth the slight inconvenience."
