= Dallas Corinthian Yacht Club =

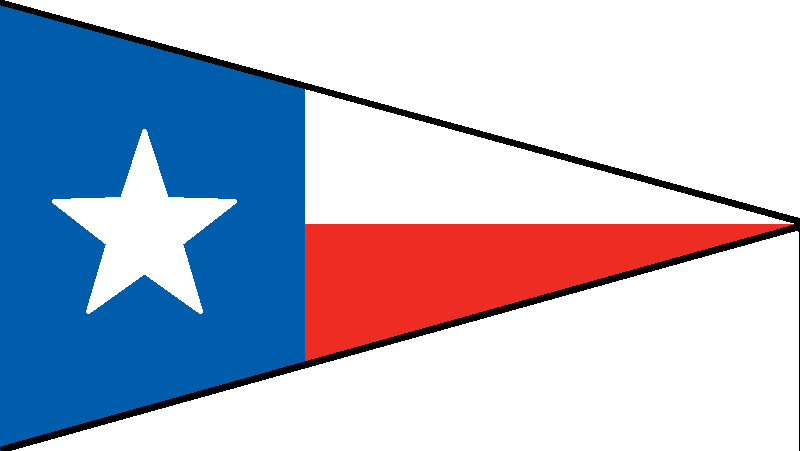
- Burgee
- Short name: DCYC
- Founded: 1928
- Location: 1399 Yacht Club Rd, Oak Point, Texas 75068
- Website: www.dcyc.org

The Dallas Corinthian Yacht Club is a yacht club located in Oak Point, Texas (United States), on the shore of Lewisville Lake.

== History ==
The club was founded as Dallas Sailing Club (DSC) in 1928 on White Rock Lake. When White Rock Lake dried up in 1956, the Dallas Sailing Club, together with some members of the Corinthian Sailing Club decided to move to Lewisville Lake under the name Dallas Corinthian Yacht Club.

== Fleets ==
The club has hosted active fleets of Snipe, Lightning, Pearson Ensign, Rebel, Longhorn, Tigercat, Sunfish, Lone Star 16, Victory 21, Thistle, Omega, 470, Laser, Catalina 22 and J/22. The J/24 class is active at the club in 2016 going forward.

== Sailors ==
William E. Bracey won the Snipe Worlds in 1934.
