= Chrysler 20 =

Sailboat class

Development
- Designer: Halsey Herreshoff
- Location: United States
- Year: 1977
- Builder: Chrysler Marine

Boat
- Displacement: 2,200 lb (998 kg)
- Draft: 5.58 ft (1.70 m) with keel down

Hull
- Type: monohull
- Construction: fiberglass
- LOA: 20.00 ft (6.10 m)
- LWL: 18.00 ft (5.49 m)
- Beam: 7.08 ft (2.16 m)
- Engine: outboard motor

Hull appendages
- Keel: swing keel
- Ballast: 810 lb (367 kg)
- Rudder: internally-mounted spade-type rudder

Rig
- Rig type: Bermuda rig

Sails
- Sailplan: masthead sloop
- Total sail area: 193 sq ft (17.9 m^{2})

Racing
- PHRF: 264

The Chrysler 20 is an American trailerable sailboat that was designed by Halsey Herreshoff and first built in 1977.

== Production ==
The design was built by Chrysler Marine in Plano, Texas, United States, from 1977 to 1980, but it is now out of production.

== Design ==
The Chrysler 20 is a recreational keelboat, built predominantly of fiberglass, with wood trim. It has a masthead sloop rig; a raked stem; a nearly-plum transom; an internally mounted, swing-up, spade-type rudder controlled by a tiller and a stub keel with a swing keel. It displaces 2,200 lb (998 kg) and carries 810 lb (367 kg) of ballast.

The boat has a draft of 5.58 ft (1.70 m) with the swing keel extended and 1.92 ft (0.59 m) with it retracted, allowing ground transportation on a trailer.

The boat is normally fitted with a small 3 to 6 hp (2 to 4 kW) outboard motor for docking and maneuvering.

The design has sleeping accommodation for four people, with a double "V"-berth in the bow cabin and two settee-style quarter berths in the main cabin. The optional head is a portable type, located under the bow cabin "V"-berth. Cabin headroom is 45 in (110 cm).

The design has a PHRF racing average handicap of 264 and a hull speed of 5.7 kn (10.6 km/h).

== Operational history ==
The boat is supported by two active class clubs that organize racing events, the Chrysler Sailing Association and the Chrysler Sailors.

In a 2010 review Steve Henkel wrote, "The boat is nicely constructed, with good finish, smooth fiberglass cabin liner, and quality hardware (eg., Harken blocks). She doesn't look bad on the water either. Worst features: Probably the most unusual (and least attractive) feature of the Chrysler 20 is her inboard pivoting rudder. Very seldom is this type of rudder design used, since it is complicated (and therefore hard to repair), and subject to collecting weed and plastic bags on its leading edge. A flip-up outboard rudder hung on the transom would have been a better choice."

== See also ==
- List of sailing boat types

Similar sailboats

- Buccaneer 200
