= Ted Hood =

American yachtsman (1927–2013)

Frederick Emmart Hood
- Hood in front of the Little Harbor facility in Portsmouth, Rhode Island c. 1990s
- Born: May 5, 1927; Beverly, Massachusetts, U.S.
- Died: June 28, 2013 (aged 86)

Frederick Emmart Hood (May 5, 1927 — June 28, 2013) was an American yachtsman and naval architect. He founded the sailmaker Hood Sails in Marblehead, Massachusetts in 1952. Hood Sails operated until purchased by Quantum Sails in 2017. Hood founded Little Harbor Custom Yachts in 1959 and sold it to Hinckley Yachts in 1999. He won the America's Cup in 1974 skippering the yacht Courageous, which was built at Minnefords Shipyard in City Island, New York, after which he built a what he believed to have been a faster yacht and sold Courageous to Ted Turner, who beat him in it on his way to winning the 1977 America's Cup.

He built the Ted Hood Marine Complex in Portsmouth, Rhode Island in 1985, where he moved Little Harbor Marine. His full service marina provided his customers with repairs for their yachts. Construction operations of Little Harbor Yachts were moved to Northern Taiwan. This operation began to design power boats exclusively due to changes in the boating market in the 1990s. In 1999 his company was sold to Hinckley Yachts.

Ted then started another independent yacht design company, Ted Hood Yachts, LLC, located in the Hinckley Yachts complex of the Melville Marina in Portsmouth, Rhode Island. Ted Hood Yachts has eight power yacht designs, including two Coastal Explorers and six Expedition series yachts, as well as two motor sailor designs on the market all with ocean-going capabilities. All of Ted Hood's yachts are currently under production in Xiamen, China.

Ted was inducted into the America's Cup Hall of Fame in 1993, and the National Sailing Hall of Fame in 2011.

== Designs ==
- AMF 2100
- Bristol 39
- Bristol 40
- Bristol 45.5
- Cape Dory 30
- Hinckley 43 (Hood)
- Hinckley 43 (Hood)-2
- Little Harbor 44
- Paceship Westwind
