= Corinthian 19 =

Sailboat class

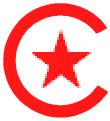

Development
- Designer: Carl Alberg
- Location: United States
- Year: 1966
- No. built: over 700
- Builders: Sailstar Boat Company; Bristol Yachts
- Role: Cruiser

Boat
- Displacement: 2,724 lb (1,236 kg)
- Draft: 2.75 ft (0.84 m)

Hull
- Type: monohull
- Construction: fiberglass
- LOA: 19.50 ft (5.94 m)
- LWL: 14.50 ft (4.42 m)
- Beam: 6.50 ft (1.98 m)
- Engine: outboard motor

Hull appendages
- Keel: long keel
- Ballast: 1,100 lb (499 kg)
- Rudder: keel-mounted rudder

Rig
- Rig type: Bermuda rig
- I foretriangle height: 22.50 ft (6.86 m)
- J foretriangle base: 6.70 ft (2.04 m)
- P mainsail luff: 23.50 ft (7.16 m)
- E mainsail foot: 10.00 ft (3.05 m)

Sails
- Sailplan: fractional rigged sloop
- Mainsail area: 117.50 sq ft (10.916 m^{2})
- Jib/genoa area: 75.38 sq ft (7.003 m^{2})
- Total sail area: 192.88 sq ft (17.919 m^{2})

Racing
- PHRF: 292

The Corinthian 19, also called the Bristol 19, is an American trailerable sailboat that was designed by Carl Alberg as a cruiser and first built in 1966.

== Production ==
The design was initially built by the Sailstar Boat Company in the United States and later by Bristol Yachts after it acquired Sailstar. Bristol sold it as the Bristol 19. Production started in 1966, with over 700 completed, but the boat is now out of production.

== Design ==
The Corinthian 19 is a recreational keelboat, built predominantly of fiberglass, with wood trim. It has a fractional sloop rig; a spooned, raked stem; a raised counter, angled transom; a keel-mounted rudder controlled by a tiller and a fixed long keel. It displaces 2,724 lb (1,236 kg) and carries 1,100 lb (499 kg) of lead ballast.

The boat has a draft of 2.75 ft (0.84 m) with the standard keel.

The boat is normally fitted with a small 3 to 6 hp (2 to 4 kW) outboard motor for docking and maneuvering. The motor is mounted in a transom well on the port side.

The design has sleeping accommodation for two people, with two straight settee quarter berths in the main cabin. There are no galley provisions. The head is located forward in between the two berths. Cabin headroom is 50 in (130 cm).

The design has a PHRF racing average handicap of 292 and a hull speed of 5.1 kn (9.4 km/h).

== Operational history ==
In a 2010 review Steve Henkel wrote, "over 700 of these shippy-looking little sloops were built between 1965 and the early 1980s. Alberg’s designs are so distinctive that his trademark look is hard to miss ... while not usually seen on the racing circuit, like most Alberg designs, this ones a solid, wholesome, forgiving, and easy-to-sail vessel, great for daysailing and overnighting in that harbor a few miles away from your home base. Best features: The Corinthian’s springy sheer, extended overhangs fore and aft, and reasonably good finish make her a pleasure to behold. Her in-the-cockpit engine well (an optional extra when new) offers convenience to the helms-person, and because of her hull shape, keeps propeller cavitation in waves to a minimum. Worst features: Her SA/D of 15.3 is in the 'very low' category, and her D/L of 399 is considered very high, making her relatively slow in light air (but relatively stable in heavy air)."

== See also ==
- List of sailing boat types
