= Halsey Chase Herreshoff =

Naval architect of production and custom yachts

Halsey Chase Herreshoff (born 1933) is a naval architect of production and custom yachts, sailor and former president of Herreshoff Marine Museum. At the museum he and Edward duMoulin founded the America's Cup Hall of Fame in 1992. Halsey is son of Algernon Sidney DeWolf Herreshoff (1886–1977) and Rebecca Chase (maiden; 1894–1991) and the grandson of the famous Nathanael Greene Herreshoff (1848–1938). As several before him in the Herreshoff family he studied Naval Architecture. At Webb Institute of Naval Architecture he finished a bachelor's degree and later a master's at Massachusetts Institute of Technology. In the US Navy, he achieved rank of Lieutenant before he started as a Naval Architect at the Bethlehem Steel Company and as a teacher at MIT. Halsey was involved in politics and was the elected chief executive officer (Town Administrator) in Bristol, Rhode Island from 1986 to 1994.

As a yacht designer, his Herreshoff Freedom 40 design led to a line of Herreshoff ketches from 27 to 45 feet and changed the way the world felt about un-stayed masts. Halsey might be best known for his career as an America's Cup sailor, having served on many cup defenders of the 12-metre class Era, first as bowman on Columbia in 1958 and concluding as navigator on Liberty in 1983. But perhaps his greatest contribution to sailing has been his development of the America's Cup Hall of Fame at the Herreshoff Marine Museum.

== Designs ==
Halsey Chase Herreshoff's sailboat designs:

- Alerion 38
- Bristol 22 Caravel
- Bristol 26
- Bristol 27.7
- Bristol 28
- Bristol 29
- Bristol 29.9
- Bristol 30
- Bristol 33
- Bristol 34
- Chrysler 20
- Chrysler 22
- Chrysler 26
- Chrysler 30
- Courier 26
- Freedom 40 AC
- Freedom 44
- Herreshoff 27
- Herreshoff 31
- Herreshoff 37
- Herreshoff 38
- Herreshoff 45
- Herreshoff America
- Herreshoff Eagle
- Herreshoff H-26
- Herreshoff Scout
- Horizon Cat 20
- Horizon Day Cat 20
- Sailstar 26
- Starwind 22
- Ticon 30
- Tmi 26
- Tmi 30
