= Irwin 27 =

Sailboat class

Development
- Designer: Ted Irwin
- Location: United States
- Year: 1967
- Builder: Irwin Yachts
- Role: Cruiser
- Name: Irwin 27

Boat
- Displacement: 6,600 lb (2,994 kg)
- Draft: 7.83 ft (2.39 m) with centerboard down

Hull
- Type: Monohull
- Construction: Fiberglass
- LOA: 27.08 ft (8.25 m)
- LWL: 20.50 ft (6.25 m)
- Beam: 8.67 ft (2.64 m)
- Engine: Universal Atomic 4 gasoline engine

Hull appendages
- Keel: keel and centerboard
- Rudder: spade-type rudder

Rig
- Rig type: Bermuda rig
- I foretriangle height: 34.00 ft (10.36 m)
- J foretriangle base: 10.50 ft (3.20 m)
- P mainsail luff: 31.67 ft (9.65 m)
- E mainsail foot: 12.25 ft (3.73 m)

Sails
- Sailplan: Masthead sloop
- Mainsail area: 193.98 sq ft (18.021 m^{2})
- Jib/genoa area: 178.50 sq ft (16.583 m^{2})
- Total sail area: 372.48 sq ft (34.605 m^{2})

The Irwin 27 is an American sailboat that was designed by Ted Irwin as a cruiser and first built in 1967.

== Production ==
The design was built by Irwin Yachts in the United States starting in 1967, but it is now out of production.

The Irwin 27 was the first production boat built by the fledgling company after its founding in 1966. The Irwin 27 followed on from the 31 ft (9.4 m) racing boat Voodoo that Irwin had constructed in 1963. Irwin had raced the boat from 1964 to 1966 and won 24 of the 28 races that he had competed in. Following the introduction of the Irwin 27, the company went on to build a line of smaller boats and later larger boats, such as the Irwin 41 and the Irwin 41 Citation racer. The company became one of the largest producers of sailboats in the United States. It went through multiple bankruptcies and name changes, before finally closing in 1992.

== Design ==
The Irwin 27 is a recreational keelboat, built predominantly of fiberglass, with wood trim. It has a masthead sloop rig, a raked stem, a raised counter transom, an internally mounted spade-type rudder controlled by a tiller and a stub keel with a centerboard. It can be fitted with a spinnaker and displaces 6,600 lb (2,994 kg).

The boat has a draft of 7.83 ft (2.39 m) with the centreboard extended and 2.67 ft (0.81 m) with it retracted, allowing operation in shallow water.

The boat was factory-delivered with a Universal Atomic 4 gasoline engine for docking and maneuvering.

The design has sleeping accommodation for five people, with a double "V"-berth in the bow cabin, an U-shaped settee with a drop-table on the port side and a quarter-berth starboard aft. The galley is located on the starboard side just forward of the companionway ladder. The galley is a straight design and is equipped with a two-burner stove and a sink. The head is located just aft of the bow cabin on the port side.

== Operational history ==
The boat is supported by an active class club, the Irwin Yacht Owners.

== See also ==
- List of sailing boat types

Similar sailboats

- Aloha 27
- C&C 27
- Catalina 27
- CS 27
- Express 27
- Fantasia 27
- Halman Horizon
- Hotfoot 27
- Hullmaster 27
- Hunter 27
- Hunter 27-2
- Island Packet 27
- Mirage 27 (Perry)
- Mirage 27 (Schmidt)
- O'Day 272
- Orion 27-2
- Tanzer 27
- Watkins 27
- Watkins 27P
