= Dickerson 41 =

Sailboat class

Development
- Designer: Ernest Tucker
- Location: United States
- Year: 1973
- No. built: 19
- Builder: Dickerson Boatbuilders
- Role: Cruiser
- Name: Dickerson 41

Boat
- Displacement: 24,500 lb (11,113 kg)
- Draft: 4.50 ft (1.37 m)

Hull
- Type: Monohull
- Construction: Fiberglass
- LOA: 41.00 ft (12.50 m)
- LWL: 31.50 ft (9.60 m)
- Beam: 12.50 ft (3.81 m)
- Engine: Westerbeke 4-230 diesel engine 50 hp (37 kW)

Hull appendages
- Keel: modified long keel
- Ballast: 8,500 lb (3,856 kg)
- Rudder: keel-mounted rudder

Rig
- Rig type: Ketch rig
- I foretriangle height: 47.50 ft (14.48 m)
- J foretriangle base: 15.50 ft (4.72 m)
- P mainsail luff: 41.00 ft (12.50 m)
- E mainsail foot: 15.00 ft (4.57 m)

Sails
- Sailplan: Masthead ketch
- Mainsail area: 307.50 sq ft (28.568 m^{2})
- Jib/genoa area: 368.13 sq ft (34.200 m^{2})
- Total sail area: 753 sq ft (70.0 m^{2}) (ketch rigged)

The Dickerson 41 is an American sailboat that was designed by Ernest Tucker as a cruiser and first built in 1973.

== Production ==
The design was built by Dickerson Boatbuilders in Trappe, Maryland, United States. The company built the boats individually with custom interiors, between 1973 and 1983, completing 19 examples of the design.

== Design ==
The Dickerson 41 is a recreational keelboat, built predominantly of hand-laid fiberglass, with marine-grade plywood bulkheads and teak wood trim. It has a masthead sloop or optional ketch rig, with epoxy-finished aluminum spars and a bowsprit. The design features a center cockpit, a concave raked stem, a raised counter transom, a keel-mounted rudder controlled by a wheel tiller and a fixed long keel, with a cutaway forefoot. It displaces 24,500 lb (11,113 kg) and carries 8,500 lb (3,856 kg) of internal keel ingot lead ballast.

The boat has a draft of 4.50 ft (1.37 m) with the standard keel fitted.

The boat is fitted with a Westerbeke 4-230 diesel engine of 50 hp (37 kW), driving a three-bladed propeller for docking and maneuvering. The fuel tank holds 100 U.S. gallons (380 L; 83 imp gal).

The design has a number of optional cabin layouts. A typical arrangement includes a double "V"-berth in the bow cabin, an L-shaped settee with a drop-down dinette table that makes a double berth and a straight settee in the main cabin. There is also an aft cabin with a double berth. The galley is located on the port side just forward of the center companionway ladder. The galley is L-shaped and is equipped with a three-burner alcohol-fired stove, a 100 lb (45 kg) capacity fiberglass icebox and a sink with a pressurized water supply. An optional navigation station is opposite the galley, on the starboard side. There are two heads, one amidships on the starboard side that includes a shower and a second optional one in the aft cabin. The headroom below decks is 6.50 ft (1.98 m).

Ventilation is provided by three opening ports and three deck hatches. There are also two fixed portlights.

The wood above decks is all teak, including the cockpit coaming, toe-rails, handrails and the hatches.

For sailing there are two speed genoa winches in the cockpit, plus genoa tracks. Three halyard winches are standard equipment. Both the mainsail and the mizzen sail have jiffy reefing. The bow incorporates an anchor locker. A teak deck was an option.

== Operational history ==
A Dickerson 41 ketch built in 1974 completed a global circumnavigation between 1975 and 1979.

In a 1994 review Richard Sherwood wrote, "the 41 is the intermediate Dickerson. Dickerson also makes a 37 and a 50. All are based on Dickerson’s long experience with cruising ketches. The 41 has a number of rig options, such as a cutter or ketch rig, a self-tacking forestaysail, twin headsails, and a roller-furling genoa."

== See also ==
- List of sailing boat types

Related development

- Dickerson 37

Similar sailboats

- Baltic 40
- Bayfield 40
- Bristol 40
- Bermuda 40
- Caliber 40
- Endeavour 40
- Irwin 41
- Irwin 41 Citation
- Islander 40
- Lord Nelson 41
- Morgan Out Island 41
- Newport 41
- Nimbus 42
- Nordic 40
