= Newport 33 =

Sailboat class

Development
- Designer: Gary Mull
- Location: United States
- Year: 1971
- Builder: Capital Yachts
- Name: Newport 33

Boat
- Displacement: 9,500 lb (4,309 kg)
- Draft: 5.20 ft (1.58 m)

Hull
- Construction: Fiberglass
- LOA: 33.00 ft (10.06 m)
- LWL: 27.00 ft (8.23 m)
- Beam: 10.83 ft (3.30 m)
- Engine: Universal M30 diesel engine 25 hp (19 kW)

Hull appendages
- General: internally-mounted spade-type rudder
- Keel: fin keel
- Ballast: 4,000 lb (1,814 kg)

Rig
- General: Masthead sloop
- I foretriangle height: 43.00 ft (13.11 m)
- J foretriangle base: 12.83 ft (3.91 m)
- P mainsail luff: 37.00 ft (11.28 m)
- E mainsail foot: 10.25 ft (3.12 m)

Sails
- Mainsail area: 189.63 sq ft (17.617 m^{2})
- Jib/genoa area: 275.85 sq ft (25.627 m^{2})
- Total sail area: 465.47 sq ft (43.244 m^{2})

Racing
- PHRF: 159 (average)

The Newport 33 is an American sailboat, that was designed by Gary Mull and first built in 1971.

The Newport 33 is a development of the Newport 30.

== Production ==
The boat was built by Capital Yachts in the United States from 1971 to 1996. The design is out of production.

== Design ==
The Newport 33 is a small recreational keelboat, built predominantly of fiberglass, with wood trim. It has a masthead sloop rig, an internally-mounted spade-type rudder and a fixed fin keel.

The boat has with the and 4.00 ft (1.22 m) with the optional shoal draft keel. It is fitted with a Universal M30 diesel engine of 25 hp (19 kW) and has a hull speed of 6.96 kn (12.89 km/h).

== Variants ==
Newport 33
Base model with a standard keel, giving a draft of 5.20 ft (1.58 m). The displacement is 9,500 lb (4,309 kg) and it carries 4,000 lb (1,814 kg) of ballast. The boat has a PHRF racing average handicap of 159 with a high of 159 and low of 159.
Newport 33 SD
Model with a shoal draft keel, giving a draft of 4.00 ft (1.22 m). The displacement is 9,300 lb (4,218 kg). The boat has a PHRF racing average handicap of 174 with a high of 174 and low of 183.
Newport 33 PH
Model with a pilot house cabin and draft of 5.17 ft (1.58 m). The displacement is 9,700 lb (4,400 kg) and it carries 4,000 lb (1,814 kg) of ballast. The boat has a PHRF racing average handicap of 159 with a high of 150 and low of 168.

== See also ==
- List of sailing boat types
