= Newport 41S =

Sailboat class

Development
- Designer: C&C Design
- Location: United States
- Year: 1974
- Builder: Capital Yachts
- Role: Racer-Cruiser
- Name: Newport 41S

Boat
- Displacement: 18,000 lb (8,165 kg)
- Draft: 6.25 ft (1.91 m)

Hull
- Type: monohull
- Construction: fiberglass
- LOA: 41.00 ft (12.50 m)
- LWL: 30.00 ft (9.14 m)
- Beam: 11.25 ft (3.43 m)
- Engine: Yanmar 35 hp (26 kW) diesel engine

Hull appendages
- Keel: swept fin keel
- Ballast: 8,215 lb (3,726 kg)
- Rudder: internally-mounted spade-type rudder

Rig
- Rig type: Bermuda rig
- I foretriangle height: 52.00 ft (15.85 m)
- J foretriangle base: 17.00 ft (5.18 m)
- P mainsail luff: 44.00 ft (13.41 m)
- E mainsail foot: 13.60 ft (4.15 m)

Sails
- Sailplan: masthead sloop
- Mainsail area: 299.20 sq ft (27.797 m^{2})
- Jib/genoa area: 442.00 sq ft (41.063 m^{2})
- Total sail area: 741.20 sq ft (68.860 m^{2})

Racing
- D-PN: 74.5
- PHRF: 114

The Newport 41S is an American sailboat that was designed by C&C Design specifically as an International Offshore Rule racer-cruiser and first built in 1974. It was later developed into a series of Newport 41 family designs.

== Production ==
The design was built by Capital Yachts in Harbor City, California, United States, starting in 1974, but it is now out of production.

== Design ==
The Newport 41S is a racing keelboat, built predominantly of fiberglass, with wood trim. It has a masthead sloop rig; a raked stem; a raised counter, angled transom; an internally mounted spade-type rudder controlled by a wheel and a fixed, swept, fin keel. It displaces 18,000 lb (8,165 kg) and carries 8,215 lb (3,726 kg) of ballast.

The boat has a draft of 6.25 ft (1.91 m) with the standard keel.

The boat is fitted with a Japanese Yanmar diesel engine of 35 hp (26 kW) for docking and maneuvering. The fuel tank holds 35 U.S. gallons (130 L; 29 imp gal) and the fresh water tank has a capacity of 75 U.S. gallons (280 L; 62 imp gal).

The design has sleeping accommodation for eight people, with a double "V"-berth in the bow cabin, an L-shaped settee around a drop-down table and double straight settee in the main cabin and an aft cabin with a double berth on the starboard side. The galley is located on the port side just forward of the companionway ladder. The galley is U-shaped and is equipped with a three-burner stove, an ice box and a sink. A navigation station is opposite the galley, on the starboard side. The head is located just aft of the bow cabin on the port side. Cabin headroom is 75 in (191 cm).

For sailing downwind the design may be equipped with a symmetrical spinnaker.

The design has a hull speed of 7.34 kn (13.59 km/h), a PHRF racing average handicap of 114 and a Portsmouth Yardstick of 74.5.

== Operational history ==
In a 1994 review Richard Sherwood wrote, "perhaps the most unusual aspect of the Newport 41[S model] is the clutter of winches around the mast, all located on the cabin roof. There are five winches that almost complete a circle. These are all for halyards and vangs. All sheeting leads to the cockpit. There are two winches on the coach roof and two primary and two secondary winches at normal locations in the cockpit."

== See also ==
- List of sailing boat types
