= Neptune 24 =

1970s US recreational keelboat

Neptune 24 CB
Development
- Location: United States
- Year: 1978
- Builder: Capital Yachts
- Role: Cruiser
- Name: Neptune 24 CB

Boat
- Displacement: 3,200 lb (1,451 kg)
- Draft: 3.50 ft (1.07 m) with centerboard down

Hull
- Type: monohull
- Construction: fiberglass
- LOA: 24.00 ft (7.32 m)
- LWL: 21.00 ft (6.40 m)
- Beam: 7.98 ft (2.43 m)
- Engine: outboard motor

Hull appendages
- Keel: stub keel with centerboard
- Ballast: 1,200 lb (544 kg)
- Rudder: transom-mounted rudder

Rig
- Rig type: Bermuda rig
- I foretriangle height: 27.00 ft (8.23 m)
- J foretriangle base: 9.58 ft (2.92 m)
- P mainsail luff: 21.75 ft (6.63 m)
- E mainsail foot: 9.00 ft (2.74 m)

Sails
- Sailplan: masthead sloop
- Mainsail area: 97.88 sq ft (9.093 m^{2})
- Jib/genoa area: 129.33 sq ft (12.015 m^{2})
- Total sail area: 227.21 sq ft (21.108 m^{2})

Racing
- PHRF: 222

The Neptune 24 is a recreational keelboat built by Capital Yachts in Harbor City, California, United States, starting in 1978, but it is now out of production.

== Design ==
It is built predominantly of fiberglass, with wood trim. It has a masthead sloop rig, a raked stem, a plumb transom, a transom-hung rudder controlled by a tiller and a fixed fin keel or stub shoal draft keel, with an optional centerboard. A standard height mast or tall rig was offered.

The fixed keel-equipped version of the boat has a draft of 4.67 ft (1.42 m), the shoal draft version has a draft of 2.00 ft (0.61 m), while the centerboard-equipped version has a draft of 3.50 ft (1.07 m) with the centerboard extended and 2.00 ft (0.61 m) with it retracted, allowing operation in shallow water or ground transportation on a trailer.

The design has sleeping accommodation for six people, with a double "V"-berth in the bow cabin, two straight settee berths in the main cabin and an aft cabin with a small double quarter berth on the port side. The galley is located on the starboard side just forward of the companionway ladder. The galley is L-shaped and is equipped with a two-burner stove, icebox and a sink. The head is located just aft of the bow cabin on the port side. Cabin headroom is 66 in (168 cm) with the pop-top closed and over 72 in (183 cm) with it open.

The design has a PHRF racing average handicap of 222 and a hull speed of 6.1 kn (11.3 km/h).

== Reception ==
In a 2010 review Steve Henkel wrote, "Capital Yachts ... offered this commodious vessel in several configurations: shoal draft long keel ... or deep fin keel (at 5-foot draft not easily tailerable or launchable without a crane), and standard rig or tall rig. Some owners of used boats report having boats with shoal keels and 'bilgeboards' or 'daggerboard.' We assume they mean a centerboard, apparently an option with the shoal keel. Best features: A poptop increases headroom to more than six feet, and a big forward hatch is a plus. Despite her beam being less than eight feet ... the Neptune 24's Space Index is best of the lot. That's due to the relatively high freeboard and bulbous trunk cabin, which increase interior space but at some sacrifice of external beauty. Worst features: Owners point out that two adults can't use the aft double (though, as the sales literature says somewhat enigmatically, '1 1/2 people can'), The same is true for the forward V-berth, unless the filler cushion is put in place, which virtually eliminates head use. Other owner complaints include poor windward ability in the shoal draft version, lack of a door on the head, and a stove positioned too close to the side of the boat and to curtains."
