= Newport 28-2 =

Sailboat class

Development
- Designer: C&C Design
- Location: United States
- Year: 1982
- No. built: 1,000 (including the Newport 28)
- Builder: Capital Yachts
- Role: Cruiser-Racer
- Name: Newport 28-2

Boat
- Displacement: 7,000 lb (3,175 kg)
- Draft: 5.18 ft (1.58 m)

Hull
- Type: monohull
- Construction: fiberglass
- LOA: 28.00 ft (8.53 m)
- LWL: 23.50 ft (7.16 m)
- Beam: 9.75 ft (2.97 m)
- Engine: Yanmar diesel engine

Hull appendages
- Keel: fin keel
- Ballast: 3,200 lb (1,451 kg)
- Rudder: internally-mounted spade-type rudder

Rig
- Rig type: Bermuda rig
- I foretriangle height: 38.00 ft (11.58 m)
- J foretriangle base: 12.00 ft (3.66 m)
- P mainsail luff: 32.50 ft (9.91 m)
- E mainsail foot: 10.25 ft (3.12 m)

Sails
- Sailplan: masthead sloop
- Mainsail area: 166.56 sq ft (15.474 m^{2})
- Jib/genoa area: 228.00 sq ft (21.182 m^{2})
- Total sail area: 394.56 sq ft (36.656 m^{2})

Racing
- PHRF: 186

The Newport 28-2 is an American sailboat that was designed by C&C Design as a cruiser-racer and first built in 1982.

The design was a development of the 1974 Newport 28, using the same hull design, but with a new unswept keel, revised rudder, new coach house top and interior.

== Production ==
The design was built by Capital Yachts in Harbor City, California, United States, from 1982 until 1987, but it is now out of production.

== Design ==
The Newport 28-2 is a recreational keelboat, built predominantly of fiberglass, with wood trim. It has a masthead sloop rig, a raked stem, a plumb transom, an internally mounted spade-type rudder controlled by a tiller or optional wheel and a fixed fin keel. It displaces 7,000 lb (3,175 kg) and carries 3,200 lb (1,451 kg) of ballast.

The boat has a draft of 5.18 ft (1.58 m) with the standard keel. The design may be fitted with a factory optional Yanmar or Universal diesel engine, for docking and maneuvering.

The design has sleeping accommodation for five people, with a double "V"-berth in the bow cabin, two straight settee berths in the main cabin and an aft quarter berth. The galley had two layout options: aft on the port or starboard side. The arrangement with the galley on aft, starboard side was the only one that included an oven. The cabin headroom is 72 in (183 cm).

The design has a hull speed of 6.49 kn (12.02 km/h) and a PHRF racing average handicap of 186.

== Operational history ==
The boat is raced in both Performance Handicap Racing Fleet and one-design fleets.

In a 2000 used boat review for Practical Sailor, Darrell Nicholson noted, "The Newport 28 has a tall, high aspect ratio masthead rig. The newer [Newport 28-2] deep keel models are about six seconds per mile faster than the original [Newport 28] version of the boat, which typically sails with a PHRF rating of 192. This is comparable to other cruiser-racers of the same size. Despite a fairly high ballast/displacement ratio, owners report that the boat is tender. This is due in part to the fairly round midship section, and in part to the fact that few 28' boats are really very stiff. Racing in Newport 28s is quite keen in some areas, particularly on the West Coast, where there are large fleets that race both as one-designs and under PHRF. The boat is a competitive PHRF racer, and enough boats have been rated so that its handicap appears fair. This means you are likely to get a rating based on the boat’s performance, not on your own sailing ability."

== See also ==
- List of sailing boat types

Related development

- Newport 28
