= William Garden =

Canadian architect

William Garden, CM (5 November 1918 – 29 April 2011) was a Canadian and American naval architect and marine engineer. For six decades, he designed watercraft ranging from commercial fishing vessels and tugboats to motor and sailing yachts.

Garden was born in Calgary, Alberta. His family moved to Oregon (and later Washington) while he was a child in 1924. After graduating from high school in Seattle, he studied boat building at the Edison Technical School, which later became part of Seattle Central Community College. He then went to work for Andrew's Boat Company on Seattle's Portage Bay and by the age of 24, had turned out more than 50 vessel designs. He served at an army ship repair facility in Adak, Alaska – "I was the only man in the Army employed in what I liked doing." He was discharged in the spring of 1946 as a master sergeant, After World War II Garden became licensed as a naval architect and set up his own design shop in Washington. He moved to Victoria, B.C., in the late 1960s and bought a nearby private island he renamed Toad's Landing, where he did his design work from then on.

He was made a Member of the Order of Canada in 2006 in recognition for being "an accomplished naval architect and marine engineer".

He died April 29, 2011, at age 92.

== Designs ==
- Bluejacket MS 23
- Gulf 32
- US Yachts US 305
