= Gulf 39 =

Sailboat class

- G-39

Development
- Designer: Capital Yachts
- Location: United States
- Year: 1971
- Builder: Capital Yachts
- Role: Cruiser
- Name: Gulf 39

Boat
- Displacement: 17,500 lb (7,938 kg)
- Draft: 5.00 ft (1.52 m)

Hull
- Type: monohull
- Construction: fiberglass
- LOA: 38.83 ft (11.84 m)
- LWL: 33.50 ft (10.21 m)
- Beam: 12.00 ft (3.66 m)
- Engine: 15 hp (11 kW) diesel engine

Hull appendages
- Keel: fin keel
- Rudder: skeg-mounted rudder

Rig
- Rig type: Bermuda rig
- I foretriangle height: 50.00 ft (15.24 m)
- J foretriangle base: 16.21 ft (4.94 m)
- P mainsail luff: 42.00 ft (12.80 m)
- E mainsail foot: 13.50 ft (4.11 m)

Sails
- Sailplan: masthead sloop
- Mainsail area: 283.50 sq ft (26.338 m^{2})
- Jib/genoa area: 405.25 sq ft (37.649 m^{2})
- Total sail area: 688.75 sq ft (63.987 m^{2})

The Gulf 39 is an American sailboat that was designed by Capital Yachts as a cruiser and first built in 1971.

== Production ==
The design was built by Capital Yachts in Harbor City, California, United States, starting in 1971, but it is now out of production.

== Design ==
The Gulf 39 is a recreational keelboat, built predominantly of fiberglass, with wood trim. It has a masthead sloop rig, a raked stem, a reverse transom, a pilot house, a skeg-mounted rudder controlled by a wheel and a fixed fin keel. It displaces 17,500 lb (7,938 kg).

The boat has a draft of 5.00 ft (1.52 m) with the standard keel and is fitted with a diesel engine of 15 hp (11 kW) for docking and maneuvering.

The design has a hull speed of 7.76 kn (14.37 km/h).

== See also ==
- List of sailing boat types
