= Newport 20 =

Sailboat class

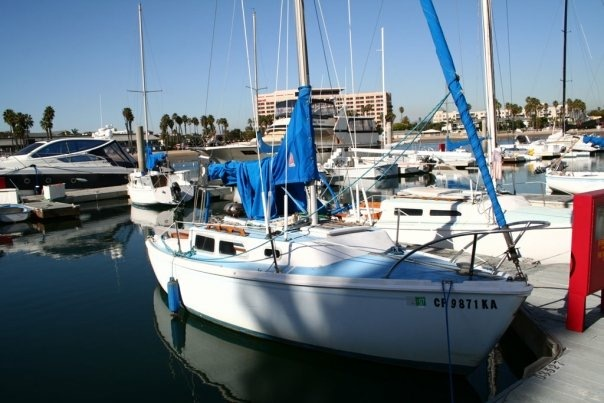

Development
- Designer: Gary Mull
- Location: United States
- Year: 1968
- No. built: three or four
- Builder: Lindsey Plastics/Capital Yachts Inc.
- Name: Newport 20

Boat
- Displacement: 2,500 lb (1,134 kg)
- Draft: 3.33 ft (1.01 m)

Hull
- Construction: Fiberglass
- LOA: 22.00 ft (6.71 m)
- LWL: 18.00 ft (5.49 m)
- Beam: 7.50 ft (2.29 m)

Hull appendages
- General: transom-mounted rudder
- Keel: fin keel
- Ballast: 990 lb (449 kg)

Rig
- General: Masthead sloop
- I foretriangle height: 25.00 ft (7.62 m)
- J foretriangle base: 8.30 ft (2.53 m)
- P mainsail luff: 21.20 ft (6.46 m)
- E mainsail foot: 8.80 ft (2.68 m)

Sails
- Mainsail area: 103.75 sq ft (9.639 m^{2})
- Jib/genoa area: 93.28 sq ft (8.666 m^{2})
- Total sail area: 197.03 sq ft (18.305 m^{2})

The Newport 20 is an American sailboat, that was designed by Gary Mull and first built in 1968. The design is out of production.

== Production ==
The boat was built by Newport Boats and also by Lindsey Plastics under its Capital Yachts Inc. brand in the United States. Only three or four were built and the design is now out of production.

== Design ==
The Newport 20 is a small recreational keelboat, built predominantly of fiberglass. It has a masthead sloop rig, an internally-mounted spade rudder and a fixed fin keel. It displaces 2,500 lb (1,134 kg) and carries 990 lb (449 kg) of ballast. The boat has a draft of 3.33 ft (1.01 m) with the standard fin keel.

The boat has a hull speed of 5.69 kn (10.54 km/h).

== See also ==
- List of sailing boat types
