= Irwin 41 =

Sailboat class

Development
- Designer: Ted Irwin
- Location: United States
- Year: 1982
- Builder: Irwin Yachts
- Role: Cruiser
- Name: Irwin 41

Boat
- Displacement: 25,000 lb (11,340 kg)
- Draft: 4.50 ft (1.37 m)

Hull
- Type: Monohull
- Construction: Fiberglass
- LOA: 41.50 ft (12.65 m)
- LWL: 35.08 ft (10.69 m)
- Beam: 13.50 ft (4.11 m)
- Engine: Perkins Engines 4-154 62 hp (46 kW) diesel engine

Hull appendages
- Keel: fin keel
- Ballast: 8,000 lb (3,629 kg)
- Rudder: skeg-mounted rudder

Rig
- Rig type: Bermuda rig
- I foretriangle height: 50.50 ft (15.39 m)
- J foretriangle base: 18.30 ft (5.58 m)
- P mainsail luff: 44.90 ft (13.69 m)
- E mainsail foot: 15.20 ft (4.63 m)

Sails
- Sailplan: Masthead ketch
- Mainsail area: 341.24 sq ft (31.702 m^{2})
- Jib/genoa area: 462.08 sq ft (42.929 m^{2})
- Total sail area: 803.32 sq ft (74.631 m^{2})

The Irwin 41 is an American sailboat that was designed by Ted Irwin as a cruiser and first built in 1982.

The Irwin 41 is sometimes confused with the Irwin 41 Citation, a racing sailboat design also introduced in 1982.

== Production ==
The design was built by Irwin Yachts in the United States starting in 1982, but it is now out of production.

== Design ==
The Irwin 41 is a recreational keelboat, built predominantly of fiberglass, with teak wood trim. It has a masthead ketch rig and may be optionally cutter rigged. All spars are coated aluminum. It features a center cockpit, a raked stem, a near-vertical transom, a skeg-mounted rudder controlled by a wheel and a fixed fin keel, deep keel or keel and centerboard. It displaces 25,000 lb (11,340 kg) and carries 8,000 lb (3,629 kg) of ballast. There are optional dinghy davits at the stern.

The boat has a draft of 4.50 ft (1.37 m) with the standard keel and 6.5 ft (2.0 m) with the optional deep draft keel. The centerboard model has a draft of 10.08 ft (3.07 m) with the centerboard extended and 4.50 ft (1.37 m) with it retracted, allowing operation in shallow water.

The boat is fitted with a British Perkins Engines 4-154 diesel engine of 62 hp (46 kW) for docking and maneuvering. The fuel tank holds 150 U.S. gallons (570 L; 120 imp gal) and the fresh water tank has a capacity of 160 U.S. gallons (610 L; 130 imp gal).

The design has sleeping accommodation for seven people, with a double "V"-berth in the bow cabin, an L-shaped settee, with a drop-down table and a straight settee in the main cabin and an aft cabin with a double berth. The galley is located on the starboard side just aft of the companionway ladder from the centre cockpit. The galley has a tiled sole and is equipped with a three-burner propane stove, an oven and a double sink. A navigation station is opposite the galley, on the port side. There are two heads, both equipped with showers, one just aft of the bow cabin on the port side and one on the starboard side in the aft cabin. The passageway to the aft cabin may include an optional entertainment center with a bar, stereo and television.

Ventilation is provided by seven opening cabin hatches.

The cockpit coaming, hand rails and toerails are all made from teak. There is an aluminum bowsprit and stainless steel pulpits at the bow and stern.

For sailing the design is equipped with winches for the mainsail, jib and mizzen halyards, genoa and mizzen sheets. The 4:1 mechanical advantage mainsheet is led to a winch on the aft cockpit coaming. Both the main and mizzen booms are equipped with internally-mounted outhauls. The mainsail has slab reefing.

== Operational history ==
The boat is supported by an active class club, the Irwin Yacht Owners.

In a 1994 review Richard Sherwood wrote, "The Irwin 41 was designed as a blue-water cruiser. The hull is moderate displacement, the keel is long, and the ballast/displacement ratio is 32 percent. Optional hulls are a centerboard/keel and a deep keel. The sail plan is balanced and designed to be handled by two people."

== See also ==
- List of sailing boat types

Similar sailboats

- Dickerson 41
- Irwin 41 Citation
- Lord Nelson 41
- Morgan Out Island 41
- Newport 41
- Nimbus 42
