= Bluejacket MS 23 =

Sailboat class

Development
- Designer: William Garden
- Location: Canada
- Year: 1984
- No. built: fewer than ten
- Builders: Halman Manufacturing; Collingwood Yachts
- Role: Motorsailer
- Name: Bluejacket MS 23

Boat
- Displacement: 6,000 lb (2,722 kg)
- Draft: 2.25 ft (0.69 m)

Hull
- Type: monohull
- Construction: fibreglass
- LOA: 24.25 ft (7.39 m)
- LWL: 20.75 ft (6.32 m)
- Beam: 10.00 ft (3.05 m)
- Engine: Yanmar 1GM 18 hp (13 kW) diesel engine

Hull appendages
- Keel: long keel
- Ballast: 700 lb (318 kg)
- Rudder: keel-mounted rudder

Rig
- Rig type: Bermuda rig

Sails
- Sailplan: masthead sloop
- Total sail area: 215.00 sq ft (19.974 m^{2})

The Bluejacket MS 23, also called the Bluejacket Motorsailer 23 and the Bluejacket 23 MS, is a motorsailer first built in 1984. It was initially built by Halman Manufacturing in Beamsville, Ontario, Canada. Later it was produced by Collingwood Yachts, in Collingwood, Ontario, but it is now out of production. The boat was hand-built on an order basis and it is thought that fewer than ten boats were completed in total.

== Design ==
It was designed by William Garden and is a development of the earlier Garden-designed Family Cat 23.

The Bluejacket MS 23 is a recreational motorsailer, built predominantly of fibreglass, with wood trim. It has a masthead sloop rig, a slightly reversed raked stem, a sharply angled transom, a keel-mounted rudder controlled by a tiller from the cockpit and a wheel from the wheelhouse. The wheel can be disconnected to allow tiller steering. It has a fixed long keel, displaces 6,000 lb (2,722 kg) and carries 700 lb (318 kg) of ballast.

The boat has a draft of 2.25 ft (0.69 m) with the standard keel.

The boat is fitted with a Japanese Yanmar 1GM diesel engine of 18 hp (13 kW) for docking and manoeuvring. The fuel tank holds 24 U.S. gallons (91 L; 20 imp gal) and the fresh water tank has a capacity of 15 U.S. gallons (57 L; 12 imp gal).

The design has sleeping accommodation for three people, with a double "V"-berth in the bow cabin. The main cabin has a dinette table, that can be converted into a third berth. The galley is located on the starboard side, just forward of the companionway ladder. The galley is equipped with a two-burner stove, a 3.3 cu ft (93 L) icebox and a sink. The enclosed head is located just aft of the bow cabin on the starboard side. Cabin headroom is 74 in (190 cm).

The design has a hull speed of 6.1 kn (11.3 km/h).

== Operational history ==
In a 2010 review Steve Henkel wrote, "best features: The accommodations offer great comfort for two. The furniture is mostly single function so, for example, you don't have to fold up your berth before you can have breakfast, or unfold the dinette (though the dinette does convert into a third berth if desired) ... Worst features: The towing weight of around 8,500 lbs (including 2,500 lbs. for stowed gear and the trailer itself) is a hefty load to pull, requiring a truck or SUV equivalent."

== See also ==
- List of sailing boat types
