= Irwin 30 Citation =

Sailboat class

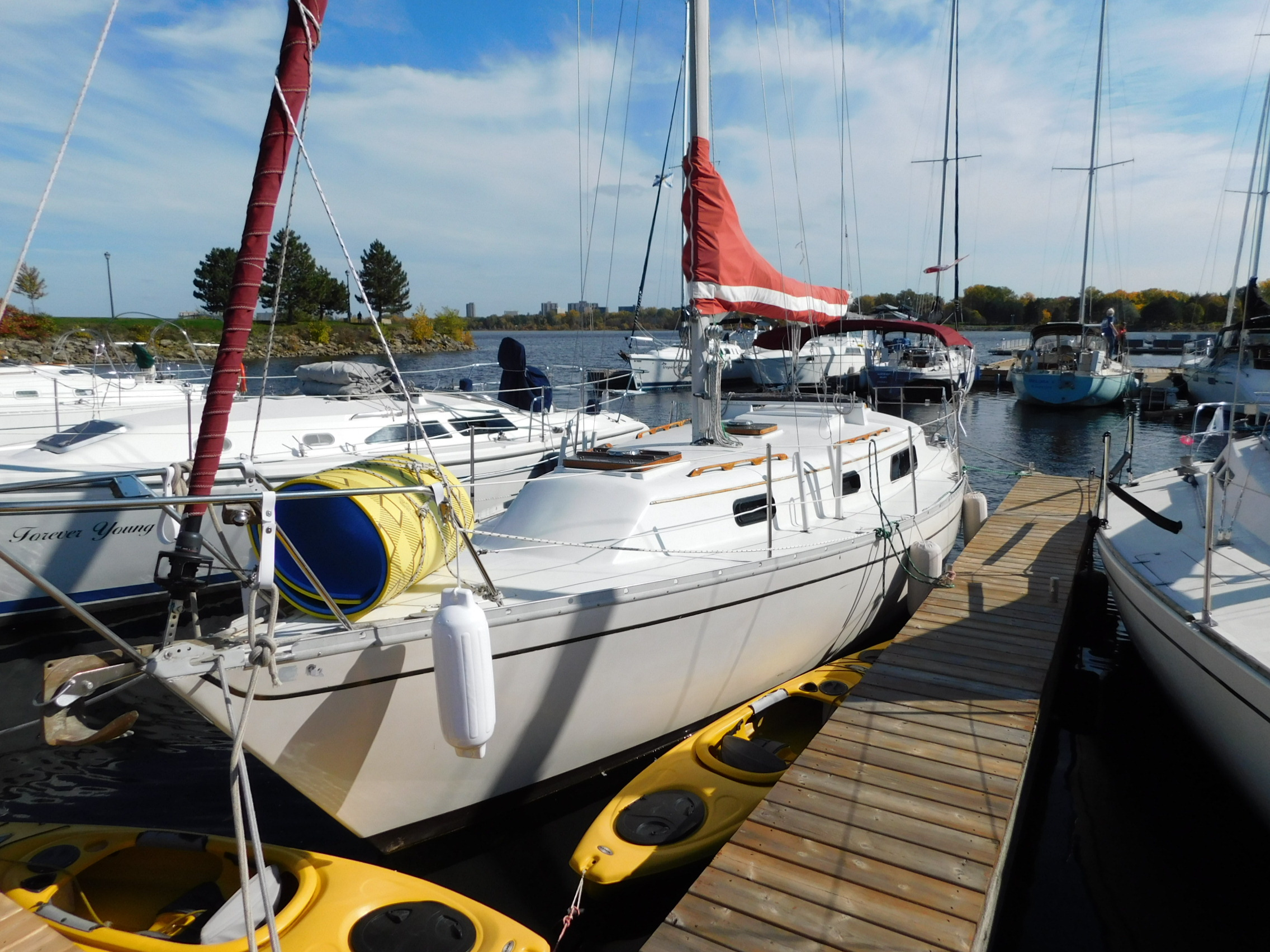

Development
- Designer: Ted Irwin
- Location: United States
- Year: 1977
- Builder: Irwin Yachts
- Role: Cruiser
- Name: Irwin 30 Citation

Boat
- Displacement: 10,400 lb (4,717 kg)
- Draft: 5.30 ft (1.62 m)

Hull
- Type: monohull
- Construction: fiberglass
- LOA: 30.00 ft (9.14 m)
- LWL: 26.92 ft (8.21 m)
- Beam: 10.00 ft (3.05 m)
- Engine: Yanmar 15 hp (11 kW) diesel engine

Hull appendages
- Keel: fin keel
- Ballast: 4,300 lb (1,950 kg)
- Rudder: skeg-mounted rudder

Rig
- Rig type: Bermuda rig
- I foretriangle height: 42.00 ft (12.80 m)
- J foretriangle base: 13.00 ft (3.96 m)
- P mainsail luff: 37.00 ft (11.28 m)
- E mainsail foot: 12.00 ft (3.66 m)

Sails
- Sailplan: masthead sloop
- Mainsail area: 222.00 sq ft (20.624 m^{2})
- Jib/genoa area: 273.00 sq ft (25.363 m^{2})
- Total sail area: 495.00 sq ft (45.987 m^{2})

The Irwin 30 Citation is an American sailboat that was designed by Ted Irwin as a cruiser and first built in 1977.

== Production ==
The design was built by Irwin Yachts in the United States starting in 1977, but it is now out of production.

== Design ==
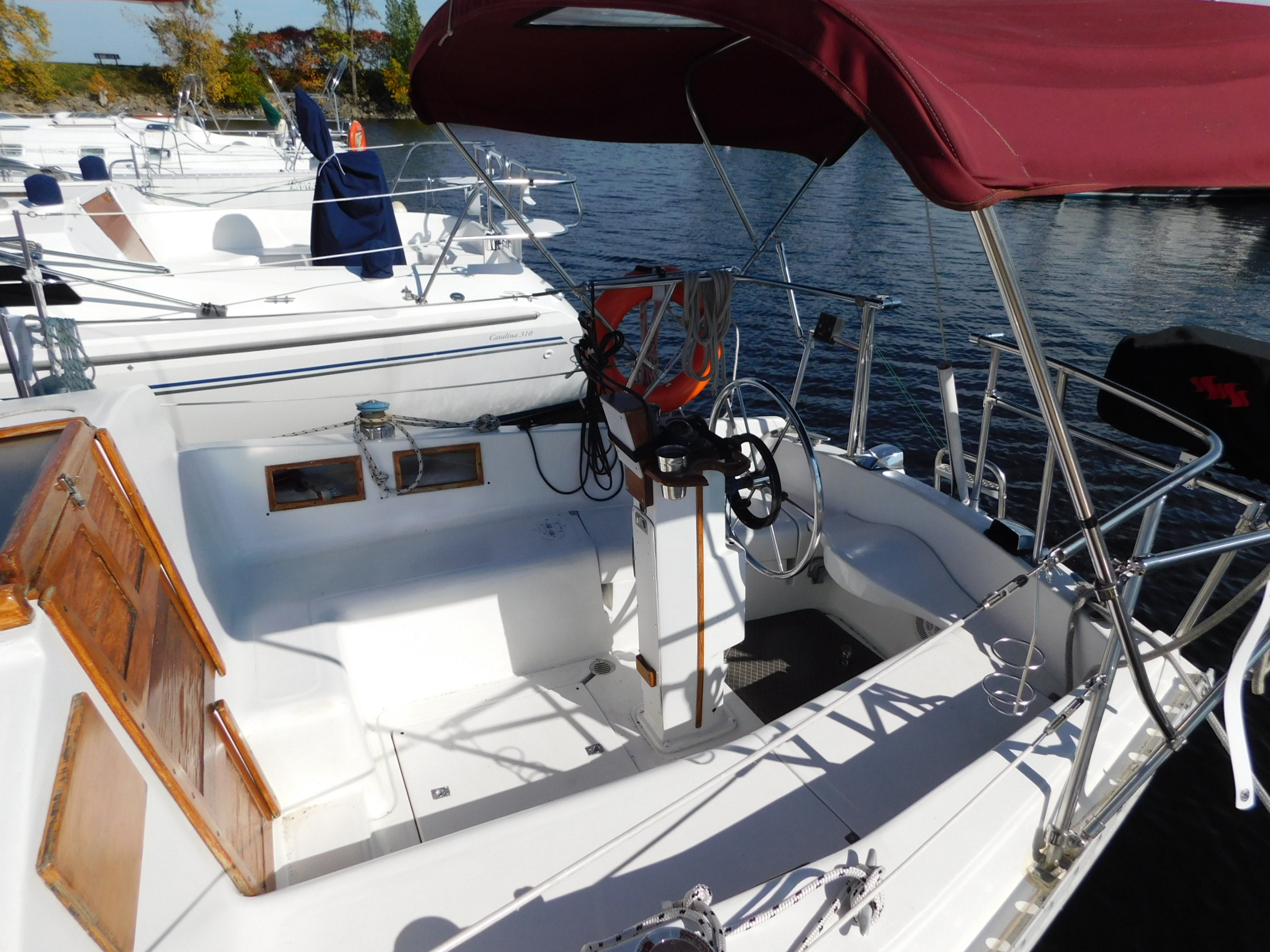
Irwin 30 Citation cockpit

The Irwin 30 Citation is a recreational keelboat, built predominantly of fiberglass, with wood trim. It has a masthead sloop rig, a raked stem, a plumb transom, a skeg-mounted rudder controlled by a wheel and a fixed shoal draft, optional deep fin keel or keel and centerboard. It displaces 10,400 lb (4,717 kg) and carries 4,300 lb (1,950 kg) of ballast.

The deep fin keel-equipped version of the boat has a draft of 5.30 ft (1.62 m), while the centerboard-equipped version has a draft of 8.08 ft (2.46 m) with the centerboard extended and 4.0 ft (1.2 m) with it retracted, allowing operation in shallow water.

The design was factory-fitted with a Japanese Yanmar diesel engine of 15 hp (11 kW) for docking and maneuvering. The fuel tank holds 30 U.S. gallons (110 L; 25 imp gal) and the fresh water tank has a capacity of 75 U.S. gallons (280 L; 62 imp gal).

For sailing downwind the design may be equipped with a symmetrical spinnaker.

The design has a hull speed of 6.95 kn (12.87 km/h).

== Operational history ==
The boat is supported by an active class club, Irwin Yacht Owners.

== See also ==
- List of sailing boat types
