= Nimbus 42 =

Sailboat class

Development
- Designer: Kaufman & Ladd
- Location: Sweden
- Year: 1981
- Builder: Albin Marine
- Role: Cruiser-Racer
- Name: Nimbus 42

Boat
- Displacement: 23,325 lb (10,580 kg)
- Draft: 5.83 ft (1.78 m)

Hull
- Type: Monohull
- Construction: Fiberglass
- LOA: 41.42 ft (12.62 m)
- LWL: 34.17 ft (10.42 m)
- Beam: 12.50 ft (3.81 m)
- Engine: Pathfinder 50 hp (37 kW) diesel engine

Hull appendages
- Keel: fin keel
- Ballast: 10,000 lb (4,536 kg)
- Rudder: skeg-mounted rudder

Rig
- Rig type: Cutter rig
- I foretriangle height: 54.00 ft (16.46 m)
- J foretriangle base: 18.0 ft (5.5 m)
- P mainsail luff: 49.00 ft (14.94 m)
- E mainsail foot: 15.0 ft (4.6 m)

Sails
- Sailplan: Cutter rigged sloop
- Mainsail area: 367.50 sq ft (34.142 m^{2})
- Jib/genoa area: 486.0 sq ft (45.15 m^{2})
- Total sail area: 853.50 sq ft (79.293 m^{2})

Racing
- PHRF: 90-99

The Nimbus 42 is a Swedish sailboat that was designed by Americans F. Michael Kaufman and Robert Ladd as a cruiser-racer and first built in 1981.

== Production ==
The design was built by Albin Marine in Sweden. It was produced from 1981 to 1985, but it is now out of production.

== Design ==
The Nimbus 42 is a recreational keelboat, built predominantly of fiberglass, with an Airex-cored deck and wood trim, including teak decks. It has a cutter rig, with aluminum spars and a keel-stepped mast. It features a raked stem, a raised counter reverse transom, a skeg-mounted rudder controlled by a wheel and a fixed fin keel, deep keel or optional stub keel and centerboard. It displaces 23,325 lb (10,580 kg) and carries 10,000 lb (4,536 kg) of ballast.

The boat is fitted with a Pathfinder diesel engine of 50 hp (37 kW) for docking and maneuvering. The fuel tank holds 60 U.S. gallons (230 L; 50 imp gal) and the fresh water tank has a capacity of 120 U.S. gallons (450 L; 100 imp gal).

The design has sleeping accommodation for eight people, with a double "V"-berth in the bow cabin, an U-shaped settee and drop-down dinette table that forms a double berth, plus a straight settee in the main cabin. There is an aft stateroom with a double berth on the port side and a single berth on the starboard side. The galley is located on the port side just forward of the companionway steps. The galley is U-shaped and is equipped with a three-burner propane-fired stove and oven, plus a double sink and an icebox. A navigation station is opposite the galley, on the starboard side. There are two heads, one just aft of the bow cabin on the port side and one on the starboard side in the aft cabin. The below deck headroom is 76 in (190 cm) and the cabin trim and sole are made from teak and holly.

Ventilation is provided by six translucent opening hatches, two dorade vents and four deck cowl intakes. Additional light is provided by four deck-mounted prisms.

For sailing the design is equipped with four halyard winches and two jib winches. The halyards are all internally-mounted. There are topping lifts for the boom and spinnaker. Both the genoa and spinnaker pole are mounted on tracks with cars. There is a bow-mounted anchor locker.

The design has a PHRF racing average handicap of 90-99 and a hull speed of 7.83 kn (15 km/h).

== Variants ==
Nimbus 42 Standard
This model has a fin keel with a draft of 5.83 ft (1.78 m).
Nimbus 42 Race
This model has deep draft keel and a draft of 7.17 ft (2.19 m), for better upwind performance.
Nimbus 42 Keel & Centerboard
This stub keel and centerboard model has a draft of 4.75 ft (1.45 m) with the centerboard retracted and 10.25 ft (3.12 m) with it extended.

== Operational history ==
In a 1994 review Richard Sherwood wrote, "Nimbus is a big auxiliary with three cabins, but with a tall, high-aspect rig for racing, Shrouds are inboard for good wind ward sheeting angles. The keel is relatively short and the rudder is well aft."

== See also ==
- List of sailing boat types

Similar sailboats

- Dickerson 41
- Irwin 41
- Irwin 41 Citation
- Lord Nelson 41
- Morgan Out Island 41
- Newport 41
