= Gulf 29 =

Sailboat class

- G 29

Development
- Designer: Capital Yachts
- Location: United States
- Year: 1982
- Builder: Capital Yachts
- Role: Cruiser
- Name: Gulf 29

Boat
- Displacement: 7,500 lb (3,402 kg)
- Draft: 4.50 ft (1.37 m)

Hull
- Type: monohull
- Construction: fiberglass
- LOA: 28.67 ft (8.74 m)
- LWL: 23.50 ft (7.16 m)
- Beam: 9.33 ft (2.84 m)
- Engine: Universal M-18 15 hp (11 kW) diesel engine

Hull appendages
- Keel: fin keel
- Ballast: 3,200 lb (1,451 kg)
- Rudder: internally-mounted spade-type rudder

Rig
- Rig type: Bermuda rig
- I foretriangle height: 36.00 ft (10.97 m)
- J foretriangle base: 11.82 ft (3.60 m)
- P mainsail luff: 31.00 ft (9.45 m)
- E mainsail foot: 10.25 ft (3.12 m)

Sails
- Sailplan: fractional rigged sloop masthead sloop
- Mainsail area: 158.88 sq ft (14.760 m^{2})
- Jib/genoa area: 212.76 sq ft (19.766 m^{2})
- Total sail area: 371.64 sq ft (34.526 m^{2})

The Gulf 29 is an American sailboat that was designed by Capital Yachts as a pilothouse cruiser and first built in 1982.

The boat is most likely a lengthened hull development of the Gulf 27.

== Production ==
The design was built by Capital Yachts in Harbor City, California, United States, starting in 1982, but it is now out of production. It was the last of Capital Yachts Gulf-series of boats.

== Design ==
The Gulf 29 is a recreational keelboat, built predominantly of fiberglass, with wood trim. It has a masthead sloop rig, a raked stem, a reverse transom, an internally mounted spade-type rudder controlled by two wheels, one in the cockpit and one in the wheelhouse, and a fixed fin keel. It displaces 7,500 lb (3,402 kg) and carries 3,200 lb (1,451 kg) of ballast.

The boat has a draft of 4.50 ft (1.37 m) with the standard keel and is fitted with a Universal M-18 diesel engine of 15 hp (11 kW) for docking and maneuvering.

The design was offered with three different internal accommodation plans. The starboard aft galley arrangement has sleeping accommodation for four people, with a double "V"-berth in the bow cabin, a straight settee in the main cabin with a drop-leaf table and an aft cabin with a single berth on the port side. The galley is located on the starboard side just forward of the companionway ladder and adjacent to the navigation station. The galley is L-shaped and is equipped with a two-burner stove, ice box and a sink. The head is located just aft of the bow cabin on the port side.

The port aft galley layout has sleeping accommodation for four people, with a double "V"-berth in the bow cabin, a straight settee in the main cabin with a drop-leaf table and an aft cabin with a single berth on the starboard side. The galley is located on the port side opposite the navigation station and just forward of the companionway ladder. The galley is L-shaped and is equipped with a two-burner stove, ice box and a sink. The head is located just aft of the bow cabin on the port side.

The aft cabin-aft head arrangement has sleeping accommodation for five people, with a double "V"-berth in the bow cabin, two straight settee berths in the main cabin around a drop-leaf table and an aft cabin with a wide single berth on the starboard side. The galley is located on both sides just forward of the companionway ladder, next to the navigation station and opposite it, with the stove to starboard and the ice box and sink to port. The head is located just aft of the gallery and companionway, on the port side.

The design has a hull speed of 6.49 kn (12.02 km/h).

== See also ==
- List of sailing boat types

Related development

- Gulf 27
