= Gulf 27 =

Sailboat class

- G 27

Development
- Designer: Capital Yachts
- Location: United States
- Year: 1970
- Builder: Capital Yachts
- Role: Cruiser

Boat
- Displacement: 6,900 lb (3,130 kg)
- Draft: 4.20 ft (1.28 m)

Hull
- Type: monohull
- Construction: fiberglass
- LOA: 27.17 ft (8.28 m)
- LWL: 22.50 ft (6.86 m)
- Beam: 9.33 ft (2.84 m)
- Engine: 15 hp (11 kW) diesel engine gasoline engine

Hull appendages
- Keel: fin keel
- Ballast: 2,750 lb (1,247 kg)
- Rudder: internally-mounted spade-type rudder

Rig
- Rig type: Bermuda rig
- I foretriangle height: 35.00 ft (10.67 m)
- J foretriangle base: 11.70 ft (3.57 m)
- P mainsail luff: 29.50 ft (8.99 m)
- E mainsail foot: 10.30 ft (3.14 m)

Sails
- Sailplan: masthead sloop
- Mainsail area: 151.93 sq ft (14.115 m^{2})
- Jib/genoa area: 204.75 sq ft (19.022 m^{2})
- Total sail area: 356.68 sq ft (33.137 m^{2})

The Gulf 27 is an American sailboat that was designed by Capital Yachts as a cruiser and first built in 1970.

The design was mostly likely the basis for the extended Gulf 29, introduced in 1982.

== Production ==
The design was built by Capital Yachts in Harbor City, California, United States, starting in 1970, but it is now out of production.

== Design ==
The Gulf 27 is a recreational keelboat, built predominantly of fiberglass, with wood trim. It has a masthead sloop rig, a raked stem, a plumb transom, an internally mounted spade-type rudder controlled by two wheels, one in the cockpit and one in the pilot house and a fixed fin keel. It displaces 6,900 lb (3,130 kg) and carries 2,750 lb (1,247 kg) of ballast.

The boat has a draft of 4.20 ft (1.28 m) with the standard keel and is fitted with a 15 hp (11 kW) two-cylinder diesel engine for docking and maneuvering.

The design has sleeping accommodation for three people, with a double "V"-berth in the bow cabin and a straight settee in the main cabin, next to a drop-leaf table. The galley is located on both sides of the companionway ladder, with a two-burner stove to starboard and a sink and ice box to port. The navigation station is on the starboard side of the pilot house. The head is located just aft of the bow cabin on the port side.

The design has a hull speed of 6.36 kn (11.78 km/h).

== See also ==
- List of sailing boat types

Related development

- Gulf 29
