= Newport 27-1 =

Sailboat class

Development
- Designer: C&C Design
- Location: United States
- Year: 1970
- Builder: Capital Yachts
- Role: Cruiser-Racer
- Name: Newport 27-1

Boat
- Displacement: 6,000 lb (2,722 kg)
- Draft: 4.25 ft (1.30 m)

Hull
- Type: monohull
- Construction: fiberglass
- LOA: 27.00 ft (8.23 m)
- LWL: 21.50 ft (6.55 m)
- Beam: 9.18 ft (2.80 m)
- Engine: Universal Atomic 4 gasoline engine

Hull appendages
- Keel: fin keel
- Ballast: 2,500 lb (1,134 kg)
- Rudder: internally-mounted spade-type rudder

Rig
- Rig type: Bermuda rig
- I foretriangle height: 34.00 ft (10.36 m)
- J foretriangle base: 11.50 ft (3.51 m)
- P mainsail luff: 29.00 ft (8.84 m)
- E mainsail foot: 10.30 ft (3.14 m)

Sails
- Sailplan: masthead sloop
- Mainsail area: 149.35 sq ft (13.875 m^{2})
- Jib/genoa area: 195.50 sq ft (18.163 m^{2})
- Total sail area: 344.85 sq ft (32.038 m^{2})

The Newport 27-1 is an American sailboat that was designed by the Canadian design firm C&C Design as a cruiser-racer and first built in 1970.

== Production ==
The design was built by Capital Yachts in Harbor City, California, United States, starting in 1970, but it is now out of production.

== Design ==
The Newport 27-1 is a recreational keelboat, built predominantly of fiberglass, with wood trim. It has a masthead sloop rig, a raked stem, a plumb transom, an internally mounted spade-type rudder controlled by a tiller and a fixed swept fin keel. It displaces 6,000 lb (2,722 kg) and carries 2,500 lb (1,134 kg) of lead ballast.

The boat has a draft of 4.25 ft (1.30 m) with the standard keel.

The boat is optionally fitted with a Universal Atomic 4 gasoline engine for docking and maneuvering. The fuel tank holds 15 U.S. gallons (57 L; 12 imp gal), the fresh water tank has a capacity of 20 U.S. gallons (76 L; 17 imp gal), while the holding tank is 6 U.S. gallons (23 L; 5.0 imp gal).

The design has sleeping accommodation for five people, with a double "V"-berth in the bow cabin, a straight settee and a drop-down dinette table that converts to a double berth in the main cabin. The galley is located on both sides of the companionway ladder and has a two-burner stove to starboard and a sink and ice box to port. The head is located just aft of the bow cabin on the port side. Cabin headroom is in excess of 72 in (183 cm).

The design has a hull speed of 6.21 kn (11.50 km/h).

== Operational history ==
In a 2010 Cruising World review Micheal Robertson wrote, "construction is typical for the era and the price point. The hull is hand laid, and the keel is lead. All through-hulls are bronze, but they're fitted with PVC gate valves. Dry storage seems endless, but tankage is inadequate for longer than a weekend cruise; the holding tank is only 6 gallons. Tiller steering is standard, and the underbody features a fin keel and a balanced spade rudder."

== See also ==
- List of sailing boat types
