= Newport 27-3 =

Sailboat class

Development
- Designer: C&C Design
- Location: United States
- Year: 1975
- Builder: Capital Yachts
- Role: Cruiser-Racer
- Name: Newport 27-3

Boat
- Displacement: 6,000 lb (2,722 kg)
- Draft: 5.16 ft (1.57 m)

Hull
- Type: monohull
- Construction: fiberglass
- LOA: 27.16 ft (8.28 m)
- LWL: 22.00 ft (6.71 m)
- Beam: 9.25 ft (2.82 m)
- Engine: optional Universal Atomic 4 gasoline engine

Hull appendages
- Keel: fin keel
- Rudder: internally-mounted spade-type rudder

Rig
- Rig type: Bermuda rig
- I foretriangle height: 36.00 ft (10.97 m)
- J foretriangle base: 11.50 ft (3.51 m)
- P mainsail luff: 31.00 ft (9.45 m)
- E mainsail foot: 10.25 ft (3.12 m)

Sails
- Sailplan: masthead sloop
- Mainsail area: 158.88 sq ft (14.760 m^{2})
- Jib/genoa area: 207.00 sq ft (19.231 m^{2})
- Total sail area: 365.88 sq ft (33.991 m^{2})

The Newport 27-3, also called the Newport 27 Mark III, is an American sailboat that was designed by the Canadian design firm of C&C Design as a cruiser-racer and first built in 1975.

== Production ==
The design was built by Capital Yachts in Harbor City, California, United States, starting in 1975, but it is now out of production.

== Design ==
The Newport 27-3 is a recreational keelboat, built predominantly of fiberglass, with wood trim. It has a masthead sloop rig, a raked stem, a slightly angled transom, an internally mounted spade-type rudder controlled by a wheel and a fixed fin keel. It displaces 6,000 lb (2,722 kg).

The boat has a draft of 5.16 ft (1.57 m) with the standard keel.

The boat may be optionally fitted with a Universal Atomic 4 gasoline engine for docking and maneuvering. The fuel tank holds 20 U.S. gallons (76 L; 17 imp gal) and the fresh water tank also has a capacity of 20 U.S. gallons (76 L; 17 imp gal).

The design was factory delivered with two different cabin layouts. The "aft-cabin" arrangement has sleeping accommodation for six people, with a double "V"-berth in the bow cabin, two straight settee berths in the main cabin and an aft cabin with a double berth on the starboard side. The galley is located on both sides of the companionway ladder, with a two-burner stove to starboard and an ice box and sink to port. The head is located just aft of the galley on the port side.

The "traditional" layout has sleeping accommodation for four people, with a double "V"-berth in the bow cabin and two straight settee berths in the main cabin. The galley is located on both sides of the companionway ladder, with a two-burner stove to starboard and an ice box and sink to port. The head is located just aft of the bow cabin on the port side.

The design has a hull speed of 6.29 kn (11.65 km/h).

== See also ==
- List of sailing boat types
