= Capital Yachts =

Sailboat manufacturer

- Company type: Privately held company
- Industry: Boat building
- Founded: 1971
- Founder: Jon Williams and Bill Smith
- Defunct: 1996
- Headquarters: Harbor City, California, United States
- Key people: President: Bill Smith
- Products: Sailboats

Capital Yachts Corporation, also called Capital Yachts, Inc. was an American boat builder based in Harbor City, California. The company operated as a division of Lindsey Plastics and specialized in the design and manufacture of fiberglass sailboats.

== History ==
The company was founded by Jon Williams and Bill Smith in 1971 when they purchased the tooling for the Newport series of boats from Elgin National Industries of New York, who owned Newport Boats. Capital Yachts put the Newport series back into production and also had new boats designed by American naval architect Gary Mull and the Canadian design firm of Cuthbertson & Cassian, famous for the C&C Yachts series. Williams and Smith had their start as sailboat dealers in the area of Santa Monica, California, before moving into manufacturing.

The company produced boats in three marketing lines: Gulf, Neptune and Newport, ranging in size from the 15.58 ft (4.75 m) Neptune 16 to the 41.00 ft (12.50 m) Newport 41.

In a 2010 review Steve Henkel noted that the company was focused on low-price over quality construction using iron keels in place of lead ones.

The company continued until business was suspended in 1996.

== Boats ==
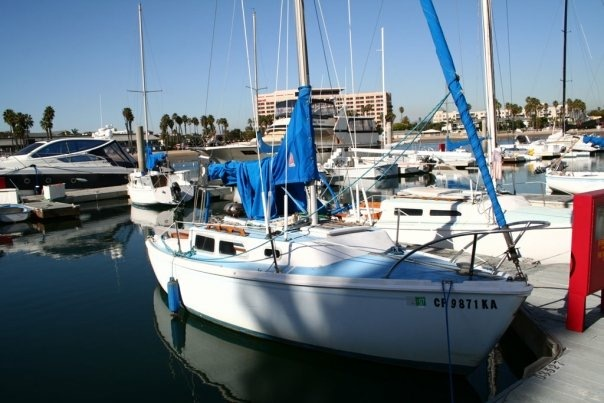
Newport 20

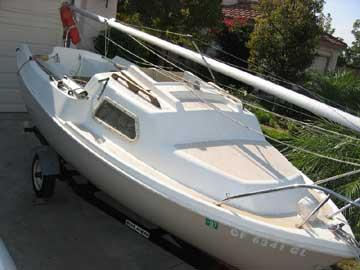
Neptune 16

Summary of boats built by Capital Yachts:

- Newport 27-1 - 1970
- Gulf 27 - 1971
- Gulf 32 - 1971
- Gulf 39 - 1971
- Newport 20 - 1971
- Newport 30-1 - 1971
- Newport 33 - 1971
- Newport 33 PH - 1971
- Newport 41 - 1971
- Newport 27S - 1974
- Newport 28 - 1974
- Newport 30-2 - 1974
- Newport 41S - 1974
- Newport 27-3 - 1975
- Neptune 24 - 1978
- Newport 27S-2 - 1978
- Neptune 16 - 1981
- Gulf 29 - 1982
- Newport 28-2 - 1982
- Newport 41 Mark II - 1982
- Newport 30-3 - 1984
- Newport 41 Mark IIIA - 1984
- Newport 31 - 1987

== See also ==
- List of sailboat designers and manufacturers
