= Irwin 10/4 =

Sailboat class

Development
- Designer: Ted Irwin and Walter Scott
- Location: United States
- Year: 1975
- Builder: Irwin Yachts
- Role: Cruiser

Boat
- Displacement: 7,000 lb (3,175 kg)
- Draft: 6.67 ft (2.03 m), with centerboard down

Hull
- Type: monohull
- Construction: fiberglass
- LOA: 25.33 ft (7.72 m)
- LWL: 21.83 ft (6.65 m)
- Beam: 10.33 ft (3.15 m)
- Engine: Yanmar 8 hp (6 kW) diesel engine or Universal Atomic 2 gasoline engine

Hull appendages
- Keel: modified long keel
- Ballast: 2,000 lb (907 kg)
- Rudder: internally-mounted spade-type rudder

Rig
- Rig type: Cutter rig
- I foretriangle height: 35.00 ft (10.67 m)
- J foretriangle base: 12.00 ft (3.66 m)
- P mainsail luff: 30.16 ft (9.19 m)
- E mainsail foot: 12.25 ft (3.73 m)

Sails
- Sailplan: cutter rigged sloop
- Mainsail area: 184.73 sq ft (17.162 m^{2})
- Jib/genoa area: 210.00 sq ft (19.510 m^{2})
- Total sail area: 394.73 sq ft (36.672 m^{2})

Racing
- PHRF: 234

The Irwin 10/4 is an American trailerable sailboat that was designed by Ted Irwin and Walter Scott as a cruiser and first built in 1975.

Unconventionally, the boat's designation indicates its beam of 10 ft 4 in (3.15 m), rather than its length overall.

== Production ==
The design was built by Irwin Yachts in the United States, from 1975 until 1982, but it is now out of production.

== Design ==
The Irwin 10/4 is a recreational keelboat, built predominantly of fiberglass, with wood trim. It is a cutter rigged sloop, with a raked stem with a bowsprit, an angled transom, an internally mounted spade-type rudder controlled by a wheel and a fixed long keel, with a cutaway forefoot and a centerboard. It displaces 7,000 lb (3,175 kg) and carries 2,000 lb (907 kg) of ballast.

The boat has a draft of 6.67 ft (2.03 m) with the centerboard extended and 2.75 ft (0.84 m) with it retracted, allowing operation in shallow water, or ground transportation on a trailer.

The boat is fitted with a Japanese Yanmar diesel engine of 8 hp (6 kW) or a Universal Atomic 2 gasoline engine for docking and maneuvering. The fuel tank holds 20 U.S. gallons (76 L; 17 imp gal) and the fresh water tank has a capacity of 45 U.S. gallons (170 L; 37 imp gal).

The design has sleeping accommodation for four people, with a double "V"-berth in the bow cabin and a U-shaped settee in the main cabin that can be combined with a drop-dinette table to become a second double berth. The galley is located on the starboard side just forward of the companionway ladder. The galley is L-shaped and is equipped with a two-burner stove and a sink. The icebox is accessible from both the galley and the cockpit. The enclosed head is located just aft of the bow cabin on the port side. Cabin headroom is 68 in (173 cm).

The design has a PHRF racing average handicap of 234 and a hull speed of 6.3 kn (11.7 km/h).

== Operational history ==
The boat is supported by an active class club, the Irwin Yacht Owners.

In a 2010 review Steve Henkel wrote, "best features: Her layout below provides a feeling of spaciousness rare in a 25-footer. Her heavy displacement and wide beam makes her stable in a breeze. The icebox, on the port side, is accessible both from the cockpit (so those on deck don't have to bother the cook to get a cold drink) and also from below deck. Worst features: In light air she's slow. There was one of these in our home harbor, and I remember literally running rings around her in four or five knots with our (then) South Coast 23. Over 10 knots of breeze, she peps up."

== See also ==
- List of sailing boat types
