= Newport 31 =

Sailboat class

Development
- Designer: Gary Mull
- Location: United States
- Year: 1987
- Builder: Lindsay Plastics/Capital Yachts Inc.
- Name: Newport 31

Boat
- Displacement: 8,500 lb (3,856 kg)
- Draft: 5.16 ft (1.57 m)

Hull
- Construction: Fiberglass
- LOA: 30.67 ft (9.35 m)
- LWL: 27.00 ft (8.23 m)
- Beam: 10.50 ft (3.20 m)

Hull appendages
- General: internally-mounted spade-type rudder
- Keel: fin keel
- Ballast: 2,600 lb (1,179 kg)

Rig
- General: Masthead sloop
- I foretriangle height: 43.00 ft (13.11 m)
- J foretriangle base: 12.67 ft (3.86 m)
- P mainsail luff: 34.00 ft (10.36 m)
- E mainsail foot: 10.25 ft (3.12 m)

Sails
- Mainsail area: 272.41 sq ft (25.308 m^{2})
- Jib/genoa area: 174.25 sq ft (16.188 m^{2})
- Total sail area: 446.66 sq ft (41.496 m^{2})

Racing
- PHRF: 180 (average)

The Newport 31 is an American sailboat, that was designed by Gary Mull and first built in 1987. The design is out of production.

The Newport 31 is a development of the 1968 Mull-designed Newport 30.

== Production ==
The boat was built by Lindsay Plastics under their Capital Yachts Inc. brand in the United States, starting in 1987.

== Design ==
The Newport 31 is a small recreational keelboat, built predominantly of fiberglass. It has a masthead sloop rig, an internally-mounted spade-type rudder and a fixed fin keel. It displaces 8,500 lb (3,856 kg) and carries 2,600 lb (1,179 kg) of ballast.

The boat has a draft of 5.16 ft (1.57 m) with the standard keel, but an optional shoal draft keel was also available.

The boat has a PHRF racing average handicap of 180 with a high of 180 and low of 180. It has a hull speed of 6.96 kn (12.89 km/h).

== See also ==
- List of sailing boat types
