= Irwin 23 =

Sailboat class

Development
- Designer: Ted Irwin
- Location: United States
- Year: 1968
- Builder: Irwin Yachts
- Role: Cruiser
- Name: Irwin 23

Boat
- Displacement: 3,200 lb (1,451 kg)
- Draft: 5.75 ft (1.75 m) with centerboard down

Hull
- Type: monohull
- Construction: fiberglass
- LOA: 23.00 ft (7.01 m)
- LWL: 18.50 ft (5.64 m)
- Beam: 8.00 ft (2.44 m)
- Engine: outboard motor

Hull appendages
- Keel: fin keel with centerboard
- Ballast: 1,500 lb (680 kg)
- Rudder: internally-mounted spade-type rudder

Rig
- Rig type: Bermuda rig
- I foretriangle height: 28.50 ft (8.69 m)
- J foretriangle base: 9.50 ft (2.90 m)
- P mainsail luff: 25.00 ft (7.62 m)
- E mainsail foot: 10.25 ft (3.12 m)

Sails
- Sailplan: masthead sloop
- Mainsail area: 128.13 sq ft (11.904 m^{2})
- Jib/genoa area: 135.38 sq ft (12.577 m^{2})
- Total sail area: 263.50 sq ft (24.480 m^{2})

Racing
- PHRF: 252

The Irwin 23 is an American trailerable sailboat that was designed by Ted Irwin as a cruiser and first built in 1968.

== Production ==
The design was built by Irwin Yachts in the United States, from 1968 until 1975, but it is now out of production.

== Design ==
The Irwin 23 is a recreational keelboat, built predominantly of fiberglass, with wood trim. It has a masthead sloop rig, a spooned raked stem, a plumb transom, an internally mounted spade-type rudder controlled by a tiller and a fixed fin keel, with retractable centerboard. It displaces 3,200 lb (1,451 kg) and carries 1,500 lb (680 kg) of lead ballast.

The boat has a draft of 5.75 ft (1.75 m) with the centerboard extended and 2.42 ft (0.74 m) with it retracted, allowing operation in shallow water or ground transportation on a trailer.

The boat is normally fitted with a small 3 to 6 hp (2 to 4 kW) outboard motor for docking and maneuvering.

The design has sleeping accommodation for four people, with a double "V"-berth in the bow cabin, a drop-down dinette table and a straight settee in the main cabin and an aft pilot berth on the port side. The galley is located on the port side amidships. The galley is equipped with a sink. The head is located in the bow cabin on the starboard side. Cabin headroom is 57 in (145 cm).

For sailing downwind the design may be equipped with a symmetrical spinnaker.

The design has a PHRF racing average handicap of 252 and a hull speed of 5.8 kn (10.7 km/h).

== Operational history ==
The boat is supported by an active class club, the Irwin Yacht Owners.

In a 2010 review Steve Henkel wrote, "The Irwin 23 was the smallest boat commercially produced by Irwin, who ended up building hundreds of boats and dozens of models. Best features: Among her comp[etitor]s, the Irwin is probably the fastest boat, despite her PHRF rating and maximum theoretical speed being equal to both the Sovereign [23 and Sovereign Antares], which have no centerboard for going upwind efficiently, as does the Irwin. The Sovereigns also have higher topsides and a taller cabin, which may provide better headroom but contribute 'top hamper' or windage that tends to slow the boat upwind. Worst features: Irwin's construction quality tended to be so-so at best."

== See also ==
- List of sailing boat types
