= Irwin Yachts =

Sailboat manufacturer

Irwin Yacht & Marine Corporation
- Company type: Privately held company
- Industry: Boat building
- Founded: 1966
- Founder: Ted Irwin
- Defunct: 1992
- Headquarters: St. Petersburg, Florida, United States
- Products: Sailboats
- Number of employees: 200

Irwin Yacht and Marine Corporation, often just called Irwin Yachts, was an American boat builder based in St. Petersburg, Florida. The company specialized in the design and manufacture of fiberglass sailboats and became one of the largest producers of sailboats in the United States.

The company was founded by Ted Irwin (June 28, 1940 – February 5, 2015) in 1966 and went through a succession of bankruptcies and subsequent name changes, before finally closing in 1992. The company produced more than 6,000 boats.

Ted Irwin was a competitive sailboat racer, but the company built many of their boats specifically for the cruising market. Many designs were aimed at the Caribbean yacht charter market, including the Irwin 42, 52 and 65.

== History ==
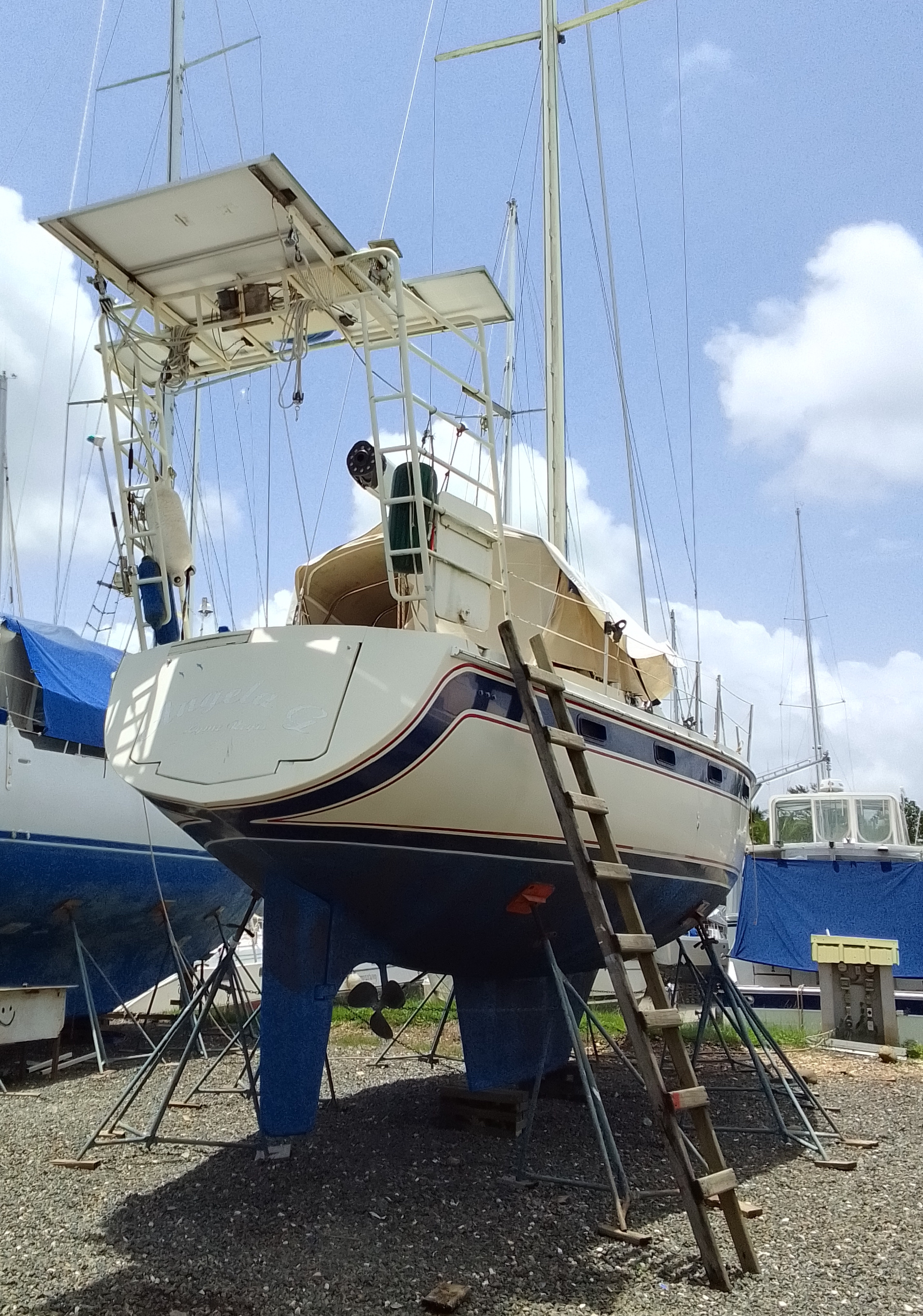
Ted Irwin's personal Irwin 44

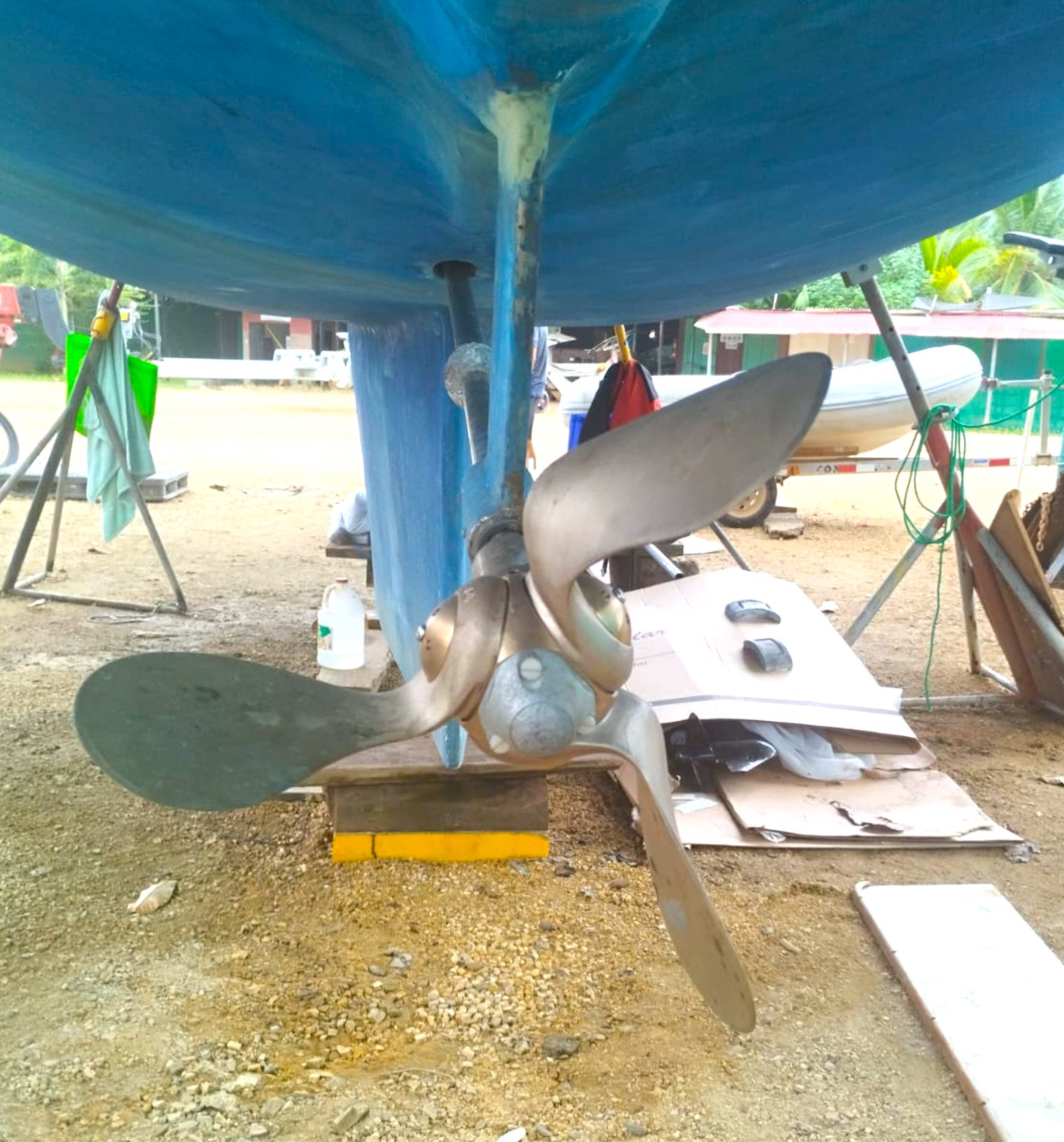
Bruntons Autoprop fitted to an Irwin 44

Irwin was born in Elizabeth, New Jersey in 1940 and developed a passion for sailing at an early age. He built his own Moth and went on to sail it to win the class North American and world championships. He served in the US Coast Guard and also worked for Charley Morgan at Morgan Yachts as a draftsman, illustrator and boat builder. He commenced his first design, the 31 ft (9.4 m) Voodoo in 1963, a boat that took six months to complete. He raced the boat from 1964 to 1966 and won 24 of the 28 races that he competed in.

Irwin founded his own company, Irwin Yacht & Marine Corporation, in 1966. He ran the company and was also the chief designer. The first design produced was the Irwin 27, in 1967.

To control costs, Irwin bought his supplies in large lots and also owned his factory and the land it was located upon, as well as the production tooling. He also produced everything possible in-house, from the boats' masts, right down to the marketing brochures.

The company started out with a 12,500 sq ft (1,160 m^{2}) factory, but expanded to 75,000 sq ft (7,000 m^{2}) and employed more than 200 people at its peak.

Typical of his cruising boats was the Irwin 41, a 41.50 ft (12.6 m) blue-water cruiser introduced in 1982.

In the 1980s, Irwin designed a series of racing boats, all named Razzle Dazzle, that he raced in the Southern Ocean Racing Conference (SORC) in Florida. His 1982 Razzle Dazzle was sold after winning the SORC that year, but the design was the basis for the Irwin 41 Citation, of which four boats were completed. Many years he sold his winning boats, which fetched high prices, using the funds and lessons learned to design better boats for subsequent years.

Irwin encouraged other builders, even when they became competitors. In 1974 he traded the molds for the 1970 model Irwin 32 in exchange for a small number of shares in the fledgling Endeavour Yacht Corporation to get founders John Brooks and Rob Valdes started in the boat building business.

The company built more cruising sailboats with a length overall of greater than 50 ft (15.2 m) than any other company worldwide, with more than 300 of the Irwin 52, 54, 65 and 68 models completed. Irwin Yacht & Marine closed in 1992 for the final time.

Ted Irwin died in Little Rock, Arkansas on 5 February 2015, from multiple myeloma, at age 74.

== Boats ==
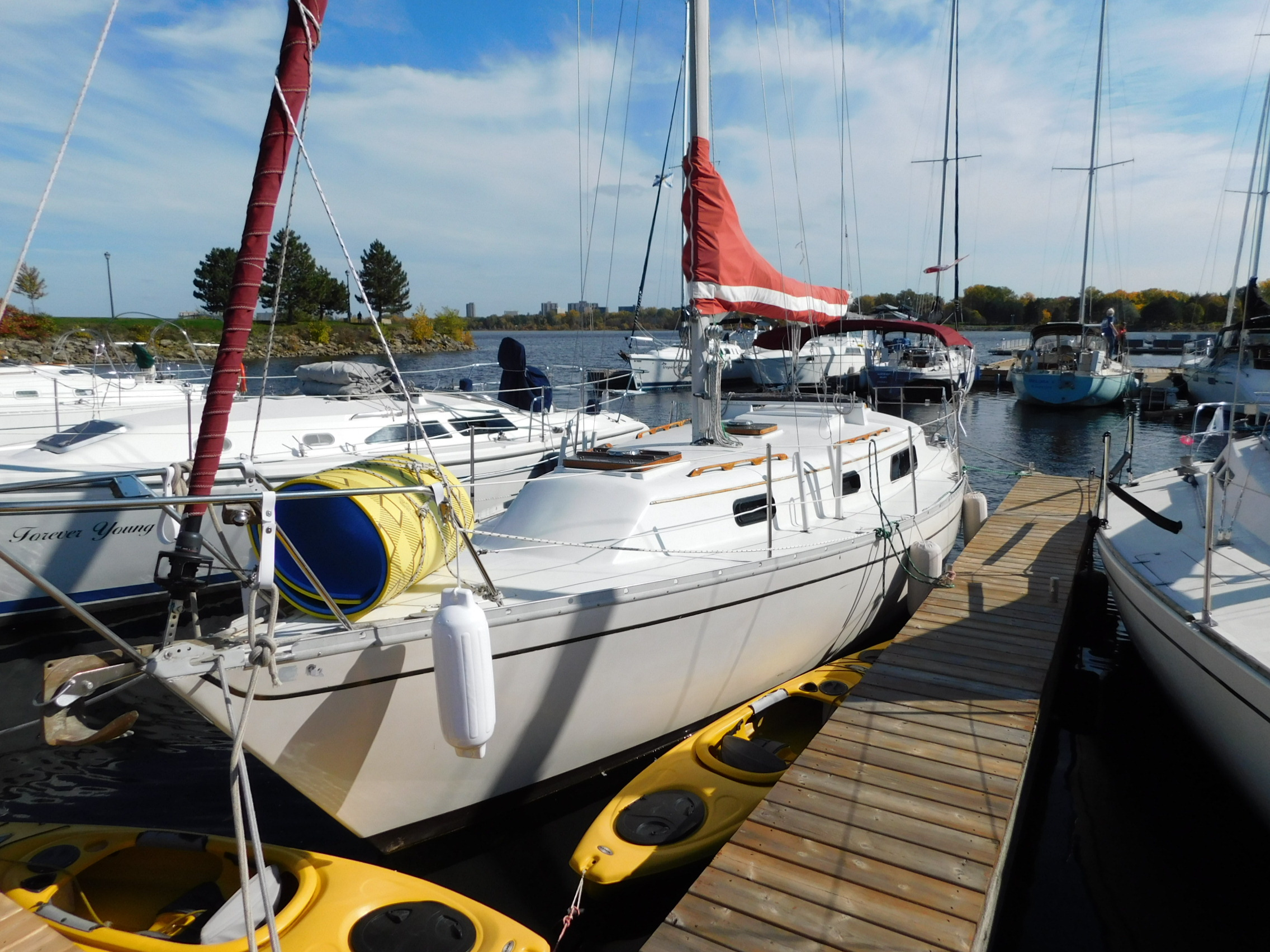
Irwin 30 Citation

Summary of boats built by Irwin Yachts:

- Irwin 27 - 1967
- Irwin 23 - 1968
- Irwin 24 - 1968
- Irwin 31 - 1968
- Irwin 25 - 1969
- Irwin 28 - 1970
- Irwin 32 - 1970
- Irwin 38-1 - 1970
- Irwin 45 - 1970
- Irwin 37-1 - 1971
- Irwin 43 (1971) - 1971
- Irwin 30 Competition - 1972
- Irwin 32.5 - 1972
- Irwin 37 1 Ton - 1972
- Irwin 37 Competition - 1973
- Irwin 28 Mk III - 1974
- Irwin 33 - 1974
- Irwin 10/4 - 1975
- Irwin Avanti 42 - 1975
- Irwin 1/2 Ton - 1976
- Irwin 28 Mk IV - 1976
- Irwin 3/4 Ton - 1976
- Irwin 30 - 1976
- Irwin 33 Mk II - 1976
- Irwin 37-2 - 1976
- Irwin 37-3 - 1976
- Irwin 42 - 1976
- Irwin 52 - 1976
- Irwin 1/2 Ton Mk II - 1977
- Irwin 30 Citation - 1977
- Irwin 37-4 - 1977
- Irwin 40 Citation - 1978
- Irwin Mini-Ton - 1978
- Irwin 34 Citation - 1979
- Irwin 39 Citation - 1979
- Irwin 21 Free Spirit - 1980
- Irwin 46 - 1980
- Irwin 65/68 - 1981
- Irwin 34 - 1982
- Irwin 37-5 -1982
- Irwin 41 - 1982
- Irwin 41 Citation - 1982
- Irwin 52-2 - 1982
- Irwin 31 Citation - 1983
- Irwin 38-2 - 1984
- Irwin 43-CC Mk I - 1984
- Irwin 32 Citation - 1985
- Irwin 43-CC Mk II - 1985
- Irwin 35 Citation - 1986
- Irwin 38 Citation - 1986
- Irwin 43-CC Mk III - 1986
- Irwin 44 - 1987
- Irwin 52-3 - 1987
- Irwin 54 - 1988

== See also ==
- List of sailboat designers and manufacturers
