= Gulf 32 =

Sailboat class

- G 32

Development
- Designer: William Garden
- Location: United States
- Year: 1965
- No. built: 400
- Builders: Gulf Marine Products; Capital Yachts
- Role: Cruiser
- Name: Gulf 32

Boat
- Displacement: 16,000 lb (7,257 kg)
- Draft: 5.17 ft (1.58 m)

Hull
- Type: monohull
- Construction: fiberglass
- LOA: 32.00 ft (9.75 m)
- LWL: 23.33 ft (7.11 m)
- Beam: 10.00 ft (3.05 m)
- Engine: Universal 40 36 hp (27 kW) diesel engine

Hull appendages
- Keel: long keel
- Ballast: 6,500 lb (2,948 kg)
- Rudder: keel-mounted rudder

Rig
- Rig type: Bermuda rig
- I foretriangle height: 39.00 ft (11.89 m)
- J foretriangle base: 12.21 ft (3.72 m)
- P mainsail luff: 35.00 ft (10.67 m)
- E mainsail foot: 12.58 ft (3.83 m)

Sails
- Sailplan: cutter rigged sloop
- Mainsail area: 220.15 sq ft (20.453 m^{2})
- Jib/genoa area: 238.10 sq ft (22.120 m^{2})
- Total sail area: 458.25 sq ft (42.573 m^{2})

The Gulf 32 is an American sailboat that was designed by William Garden as a cruiser and first built in 1965.

== Production ==
The design was initially built by Gulf Marine Products starting in 1965 and later by Capital Yachts in Harbor City, California, United States. It was produced until 1990, with 400 boats completed, but it is now out of production.

== Design ==
The Gulf 32 is a recreational keelboat, built predominantly of fiberglass, with wood trim. It is a cutter riged sloop, with a raked stem, an angled transom, a keel-hung rudder controlled by two wheels, one on the aft cockpit and one in the pilot house. It has a fixed long keel or an optional shoal draft keel. It displaces 16,000 lb (7,257 kg) and carries 6,500 lb (2,948 kg) of ballast.

The boat has a draft of 5.17 ft (1.58 m) with the standard keel and 4.5 ft (1.4 m) with the optional shoal draft keel. The boat is fitted with a Universal 40 36 hp (27 kW) diesel engine for docking and maneuvering.

The design has sleeping accommodation for six people, with a truncated double "V"-berth in the bow cabin, an L-shaped settee and a straight settee in the main cabin and an aft cabin with a quarter berth on the starboard side. The galley is located on the port side of the wheelhouse. The galley is U-shaped and is equipped with a three-burner stove, ice box and a double sink. A navigation station is opposite the galley, on the starboard side. The head is located just aft of the bow cabin on the starboard side.

The design has a hull speed of 6.47 kn (11.98 km/h).

== Operational history ==
In a 2016 article in Cruising World magazine, Ken Painter wrote, "nine years ago I decided to take the leap from trailer-sailer to smaller ocean cruiser, and went looking for an affordable, seaworthy and comfortable sailboat capable of exploring the Pacific Northwest and maybe, someday, sailing around the world. When I first viewed Mariah, a 1978 Gulf Pilothouse 32 I'd found on Craigslist, I was struck by her lines, her interior volume and the flush deck ... Mariah proved herself reliable and comfortable throughout an eight-month cruise from Seattle to Puerto Vallarta, Mexico, and back to San Diego in 2012 and 2013. I still get regular compliments on her design."

== See also ==
- List of sailing boat types
