= Hotfoot 27 =

Sailboat class

Development
- Designer: Doug Hemphill
- Location: Canada
- Year: 1981
- Builder: Hotfoot Boats
- Name: Hotfoot 27

Boat
- Displacement: 3,600 lb (1,633 kg)
- Draft: 5.50 ft (1.68 m)

Hull
- Type: Monohull
- Construction: Fibreglass
- LOA: 27.00 ft (8.23 m)
- LWL: 22.00 ft (6.71 m)
- Beam: 9.33 ft (2.84 m)
- Engine: Outboard motor

Hull appendages
- Keel: fin keel
- Ballast: 1,500 lb (680 kg)
- Rudder: transom-mounted rudder

Rig
- Rig type: Bermuda rig
- I foretriangle height: 29.08 ft (8.86 m)
- J foretriangle base: 9.75 ft (2.97 m)
- P mainsail luff: 31.50 ft (9.60 m)
- E mainsail foot: 13.00 ft (3.96 m)

Sails
- Sailplan: Fractional rigged sloop
- Mainsail area: 204.75 sq ft (19.022 m^{2})
- Jib/genoa area: 141.77 sq ft (13.171 m^{2})
- Total sail area: 346.52 sq ft (32.193 m^{2})

Racing
- PHRF: 147 (average)

The Hotfoot 27 is a Canadian sailboat that was designed by Doug Hemphill as racer-cruiser and first built in 1981.

== Production ==
The design was built by Hotfoot Boats in Canada, but the company is no longer in business and the boat design is now out of production.

== Design ==
The Hotfoot 27 is a recreational keelboat, built predominantly of fibreglass, with wood trim. It has a fractional sloop rig, a raked stem, a vertical transom, a transom-hung rudder controlled by a tiller and a fixed fin keel. It displaces 3,600 lb (1,633 kg) and carries 1,500 lb (680 kg) of ballast.

The boat has a draft of 5.50 ft (1.68 m) with the standard keel fitted. The fresh water tank has a capacity of 12 U.S. gallons (45 L; 10.0 imp gal). The boat is normally fitted with a small outboard motor for docking and maneuvering. The motor is mounted in the starboard lazarette and can be swung up when not in use and the hull opening covered with a hatch.

The boat's galley is located on the starboard side. It includes a sink and a single-burner alcohol stove, which both slide under the cockpit for stowage. The head is a chemical type and is located forward, just aft of the bow "V"-berth, forward of the bulkhead. Additional sleeping space is provided in the cabin, with two berths. A chart table is located on the port side and also stows under the cockpit when not in use.

Standard equipment includes a spinnaker and associated gear, an outboard motor bracket, headfoil (a headsail airfoil-shaped reinforcement) and a compass. The boat's controls all can be actuated from the cockpit and include internally-mounted halyards. The cockpit has two genoa winches and two winches for the halyards. There is a 4:1 internal outhaul, an 8:1 boom vang and adjustable backstay and running backstays.

The design has a PHRF racing average handicap of 147 with a high of 152 and low of 138. It has a hull speed of 6.29 kn (11.65 km/h).

== Operational history ==
In a review Richard Sherwood wrote, "the Hotfoot is a new design that is selling well in Victoria, B.C., and starting to move south. Keel and rudder are both deep to assist to windward, often a problem with boats this light. The running backstays are unusual. The manufacturers feel that they are needed for shaping the sail, not for keeping the rig up."

== See also ==
- List of sailing boat types

Similar sailboats

- Aloha 27
- Cal 27
- Cal 2-27
- Cal 3-27
- Catalina 27
- Catalina 270
- Catalina 275 Sport
- C&C 27
- Crown 28
- CS 27
- Edel 820
- Express 27
- Fantasia 27
- Halman Horizon
- Hullmaster 27
- Hunter 27
- Hunter 27-2
- Hunter 27-3
- Irwin 27
- Island Packet 27
- Mirage 27 (Schmidt)
- Mirage 27 (Perry)
- Mirage 275
- O'Day 272
- Orion 27-2
- Watkins 27
- Watkins 27P
