= Newport 27S-2 =

Sailboat class

Development
- Designer: C&C Design
- Location: United States
- Year: 1978
- Builder: Capital Yachts
- Role: Cruiser
- Name: Newport 27S-2

Boat
- Displacement: 6,400 lb (2,903 kg)
- Draft: 5.20 ft (1.58 m)

Hull
- Type: monohull
- Construction: fiberglass
- LOA: 6,400 ft (2,000 m)
- LWL: 27.00 ft (8.23 m)
- Beam: 9.26 ft (2.82 m)

Hull appendages
- Keel: fin keel
- Rudder: internally-mounted spade-type

Rig
- Rig type: Bermuda rig
- I foretriangle height: 36.00 ft (10.97 m)
- J foretriangle base: 11.50 ft (3.51 m)
- P mainsail luff: 31.00 ft (9.45 m)
- E mainsail foot: 10.30 ft (3.14 m)

Sails
- Sailplan: masthead sloop
- Mainsail area: 159.65 sq ft (14.832 m^{2})
- Jib/genoa area: 207.00 sq ft (19.231 m^{2})
- Total sail area: 366.65 sq ft (34.063 m^{2})

The Newport 27S-2, or Newport 27S-II, is an American sailboat that was designed by the Canadian design firm C&C Design as a cruiser and first built in 1978.

== Production ==
The design was built by Capital Yachts in Harbor City, California, United States, starting in 1978, but it is now out of production.

== Design ==
The Newport 27S-2 is a recreational keelboat, built predominantly of fiberglass, with wood trim. It has a masthead sloop rig, a raked stem, a plumb transom, a spade-type rudder controlled by a wheel and a fixed fin keel. It displaces 6,400 lb (2,903 kg).

The boat has a draft of 5.20 ft (1.58 m) with the standard keel.

The design has sleeping accommodation for four people, with a double "V"-berth in the bow cabin and two straight settee berths in the main cabin. The galley is located on both sides of the companionway ladder, with a two-burner stove to starboard and a sink and ice box to port. The head is located just aft of the bow cabin on the port side and includes a shower.

The design has a hull speed of 6.33 kn (11.72 km/h).

== See also ==
- List of sailing boat types
