= Irwin 25 =

Sailboat class

Development
- Designer: Ted Irwin
- Location: United States
- Year: 1969
- Builder: Irwin Yachts
- Role: Cruiser

Boat
- Displacement: 5,400 lb (2,449 kg)
- Draft: 6.67 ft (2.03 m) with centerboard down

Hull
- Type: monohull
- Construction: fiberglass
- LOA: 25.25 ft (7.70 m)
- LWL: 20.50 ft (6.25 m)
- Beam: 8.00 ft (2.44 m)
- Engine: inboard engine or outboard motor

Hull appendages
- Keel: fin keel with centerboard
- Ballast: 2,200 lb (998 kg)
- Rudder: internally-mounted spade-type rudder

Rig
- Rig type: Bermuda rig
- I foretriangle height: 31.25 ft (9.53 m)
- J foretriangle base: 10.00 ft (3.05 m)
- P mainsail luff: 29.50 ft (8.99 m)
- E mainsail foot: 11.00 ft (3.35 m)

Sails
- Sailplan: masthead sloop
- Mainsail area: 162.25 sq ft (15.074 m^{2})
- Jib/genoa area: 156.25 sq ft (14.516 m^{2})
- Total sail area: 318.50 sq ft (29.590 m^{2})

Racing
- PHRF: 228

The Irwin 25 is an American trailerable sailboat that was designed by Ted Irwin as a cruiser and first built in 1969.

== Production ==
The design was built by Irwin Yachts in the United States from 1969 until 1976, but it is now out of production.

== Design ==
The Irwin 25 is a recreational keelboat, built predominantly of fiberglass, with wood trim. It has a masthead sloop rig; a spooned, raked stem; a raised counter, plumb transom; an internally mounted spade-type rudder controlled by a tiller and a fixed fin keel with a retractable centerboard. A fixed fin keel model was also available. It displaces 5,400 lb (2,449 kg) and carries 2,200 lb (998 kg) of lead ballast.

The keel-equipped version of the boat has a draft of 4.0 ft (1.2 m), while the centreboard-equipped version has a draft of 6.67 ft (2.03 m) with the centerboard extended and 2.67 ft (0.81 m) with it retracted, allowing operation in shallow water or ground transportation on a trailer.

The boat is normally fitted with a small 4 to 8 hp (3 to 6 kW) outboard motor, or an inboard motor for docking and maneuvering.

The design has sleeping accommodation for four to six people, with a double "V"-berth in the bow cabin, two straight settees in the main cabin, one of which can convert to a double with the drop-down dinette table, and an aft quarter berth on the port side. The galley is located on the starboard side abeam the companionway ladder. The galley is equipped with a fold-down two-burner stove, an icebox and a sink. The enclosed head is located just aft of the bow cabin on the port side. Cabin headroom is 69 in (175 cm). The fresh water tank has a capacity of 14 U.S. gallons (53 L; 12 imp gal)

The design has a PHRF racing average handicap of 228 and a hull speed of 6.1 kn (11.3 km/h).

== Operational history ==
The boat is supported by an active class club, the Irwin Yacht Owners.

In a 2010 review Steve Henkel wrote, "Ted Irwin grew up in St. Petersburg, FL, and as a kid sailed boats in Tampa Bay. As a young man, he worked briefly in the plant of Charlie Morgan's Morgan Yacht Corp. That experience may have rubbed off a bit on the design of his Irwin 25 (introduced in 1968), which to a great extent resembles the Morgan 24/25 ... introduced in 1965. Both boats were popular club racers in the later 1960s and 1970s, but somehow the Morgan usually had the edge. The Irwin has the same displacement but a bit more ballast, a foot shorter waterline but a longer LOD as her overhangs are not as chopped off as the Morgan's; she has many similarities below the waterline, including a high aspect ratio centerboard ... her headroom gains an inch due to her doghouse, and her PHRF is a scant three seconds per mile higher. She was available as a keel/centerboarder ... or with a full keel (4' 0" draft, 1825 lbs. ballast). She had a choice of layouts: settee berths and a portside quarter berth ... or a dinette arrangement. Best features: None notable. Worst features: Centerboards and pendants on these boats are prone to problems,"

== See also ==
- List of sailing boat types
