= Newport 41 =

Sailboat class

Newport 41S
Development
- Designer: C&C Design
- Location: United States
- Year: circa 1972
- Builder: Capital Yachts
- Name: Newport 41S

Boat
- Displacement: 18,000 lb (8,165 kg)
- Draft: 6.25 ft (1.91 m)

Hull
- Type: Monohull
- Construction: Fiberglass
- LOA: 41.00 ft (12.50 m)
- LWL: 30.00 ft (9.14 m)
- Beam: 11.25 ft (3.43 m)
- Engine: Yanmar 35 hp (26 kW) diesel engine

Hull appendages
- Keel: fin keel
- Ballast: 8,215 lb (3,726 kg)
- Rudder: spade-type rudder

Rig
- Rig type: Bermuda rig
- I foretriangle height: 52.00 ft (15.85 m)
- J foretriangle base: 17.00 ft (5.18 m)
- P mainsail luff: 44.00 ft (13.41 m)
- E mainsail foot: 13.60 ft (4.15 m)

Sails
- Sailplan: Masthead sloop
- Mainsail area: 299.20 sq ft (27.797 m^{2})
- Jib/genoa area: 442.00 sq ft (41.063 m^{2})
- Total sail area: 741.20 sq ft (68.860 m^{2})

Racing
- D-PN: 74.5
- PHRF: 114

The Newport 41 is a family of American sailboats that was designed by C&C Design as International Offshore Rule (IOR) racer-cruisers and first built in about 1972.

== Production ==
The design was built by Lindsay Plastics and later by Capital Yachts in Harbor City, California, United States. Capital built the various models from about 1972 until the early 1990s, but it is now out of production.

Due to poor surviving documentation, the dates of production and new model introduction are considered to be approximate.

== Design ==
The Newport 41 design was based upon the 1969 C&C Yachts Redline 41 Mark II. The design went out of production in 1972 and C&C sold the molds to Enterprise Yachts who then resold them to Lindsay Plastics who built some boats, and then to Capital Yachts.

The Newport 41 is a recreational keelboat, built predominantly of fiberglass, with teak wood trim. It has a masthead sloop rig with anodized aluminum spars, a raked stem, a raised counter reverse transom, a spade-type rudder controlled by a wheel and a fixed swept fin keel.

Newport 41S is typical of the models for interior layout. The 41S design has sleeping accommodation for seven people, with a double "V"-berth in the bow cabin, screened by a curtain, an L-shaped settee with a fold-down dinette table and a straight settee in the main cabin, with an optional pilot berth above, and an aft cabin with a berth on the starboard side. The galley is located on the port side just forward of the companionway ladder. The galley is U-shaped and is equipped with a three-burner alcohol-fired stove and a sink with manually-pumped fresh water, with manually pumped seawater and pressurized fresh water optional. A navigation station is opposite the galley, on the starboard side. The head is located just aft of the bow cabin on the port side and includes a molded fiberglass shower.

Ventilation is provided by an opening port in the head, two translucent deck hatches and two opening ports. There are also four fixed ports.

For sailing, the design is equipped with a mainsheet traveler on the coach house roof. The perforated toerail can be used to mount sheeting blocks for sail control. A jib sheet track, internally-mounted outhaul, boom vang and a spinnaker were all factory options.

== Variants ==
Newport 41S
This model was introduced in about 1972 specifically for the IOR racing rules. It has a length overall of 41.00 ft (12.5 m), a waterline length of 30.00 ft (9.1 m), displaces 18,000 lb (8,165 kg) and carries 8,215 lb (3,726 kg) of ballast. The boat has a draft of 6.25 ft (1.91 m) with the standard keel fitted. The boat is fitted with a Japanese Yanmar diesel engine of 35 hp (26 kW). The fuel tank holds 35 U.S. gallons (130 L; 29 imp gal) and the fresh water tank has a capacity of 75 U.S. gallons (280 L; 62 imp gal). Below decks headroom is 6.25 ft (191 cm). The boat has a PHRF racing average handicap of 114 and a Portsmouth Yardstick of 74.5.
Newport 41
This model was introduced in about 1977. It has a length overall of 41.00 ft (12.5 m), a waterline length of 30.00 ft (9.1 m), displaces 18,000 lb (8,165 kg) and carries 8,215 lb (3,726 kg) of ballast. The boat has a draft of 6.42 ft (1.96 m) with the standard keel fitted.
Newport 41 Mark II
This model was introduced in about 1982 and incorporated a new coach house roof and rudder design. It has a length overall of 41.00 ft (12.5 m), a waterline length of 32.15 ft (9.8 m), displaces 18,000 lb (8,165 kg) and carries 8,215 lb (3,726 kg) of ballast. The boat has a draft of 6.25 ft (1.91 m) with the standard keel fitted. The boat is fitted with a Universal M-40 diesel engine of 32 hp (24 kW). The fuel tank holds 40 U.S. gallons (150 L; 33 imp gal) and the fresh water tank has a capacity of 80 U.S. gallons (300 L; 67 imp gal).
Newport 41 Mark IIIA
This model was introduced in about 1984. It has a length overall of 41.00 ft (12.5 m), a waterline length of 30.50 ft (9.3 m), displaces 16,427 lb (7,451 kg) and carries 8,215 lb (3,726 kg) of ballast. The boat has a draft of 6.25 ft (1.91 m) with the standard keel fitted.

== Operational history ==
Darrell Nicholson, editor of Practical Sailor, wrote in a 2003 review, "the N-41 makes an excellent case for the fact that a boat that was designed intelligently and built well in the first place has a good chance of standing the tests of time ... Speed and maneuverability are significant virtues in a cruising boat, and the N-41 has retained them. Sailors who enjoy racing but are less happy about the expense, discomfort, and "to the edge”" design of today's racing boats will find the Newport 41 to their liking."

== See also ==
- List of sailing boat types

Related development

- Newport 41S

Similar sailboats

- Dickerson 41
- Irwin 41
- Irwin 41 Citation
- Lord Nelson 41
- Morgan Out Island 41
- Nimbus 42
