= US Yachts US 305 =

Sailboat class

Development
- Designer: William Garden
- Location: United States
- Year: 1978
- Builder: US Yachts
- Role: Cruiser
- Name: US Yachts US 305

Boat
- Displacement: 10,000 lb (4,536 kg)
- Draft: 4.00 ft (1.22 m)

Hull
- Type: monohull
- Construction: fiberglass
- LOA: 30.00 ft (9.14 m)
- LWL: 26.25 ft (8.00 m)
- Beam: 10.17 ft (3.10 m)
- Engine: Optional Volvo MD11C diesel engine

Hull appendages
- Keel: fin keel
- Ballast: 3,500 lb (1,588 kg)
- Rudder: internally-mounted spade-type rudder

Rig
- Rig type: Bermuda rig
- I foretriangle height: 40.00 ft (12.19 m)
- J foretriangle base: 14.00 ft (4.27 m)
- P mainsail luff: 32.50 ft (9.91 m)
- E mainsail foot: 11.00 ft (3.35 m)

Sails
- Sailplan: masthead sloop
- Mainsail area: 178.75 sq ft (16.606 m^{2})
- Jib/genoa area: 280.00 sq ft (26.013 m^{2})
- Total sail area: 458.75 sq ft (42.619 m^{2})

The US Yachts US 305 is an American sailboat that was designed by William Garden as a cruiser and first built in 1978.

The US 305 is a development of the 1977 Buccaneer 305, which was built by Buccaneer Yachts, also a division of Bayliner.

== Production ==
The design was built by US Yachts, a division of Bayliner, in the United States, starting in 1978, but it is now out of production.

== Design ==
The US 305 is a recreational keelboat, built predominantly of fiberglass, with wood trim. It has a masthead sloop rig, a raked stem, a nearly plumb transom, an internally mounted spade-type rudder controlled by a wheel and a fixed fin keel. It displaces 10,000 lb (4,536 kg) and carries 3,500 lb (1,588 kg) of ballast.

The boat has a draft of 4.00 ft (1.22 m) with the standard keel.

A Swedish Volvo MD11C diesel engine was a factory option. The fuel tank holds 42 U.S. gallons (160 L; 35 imp gal) and the fresh water tank has a capacity of 36 U.S. gallons (140 L; 30 imp gal).

The design has sleeping accommodation for six people, with a double "V"-berth in the bow cabin, an L-shaped settee and a straight settee in the main cabin and an aft cabin with a double berth on the starboard side. The galley is located on the port side just forward of the companionway ladder. The galley is L-shaped and is equipped with a three-burner stove and a sink. A navigation station is opposite the galley, on the starboard side. The head is located just aft of the bow cabin on the port side. Cabin headroom is 74 in (188 cm).

For sailing the design may be equipped with one of a number of jibs, genoas or a storm jib.

The design has a hull speed of 6.87 kn (12.72 km/h).

== See also ==
- List of sailing boat types
