= Newport 28 =

Sailboat class

Development
- Designer: C&C Design
- Location: United States
- Year: 1974
- No. built: 1,000 (including the Newport 28-2)
- Builder: Capital Yachts
- Role: Cruiser-Racer
- Name: Newport 28

Boat
- Displacement: 7,000 lb (3,175 kg)
- Draft: 4.50 ft (1.37 m)

Hull
- Type: monohull
- Construction: fiberglass
- LOA: 27.74 ft (8.46 m)
- LWL: 25.00 ft (7.62 m)
- Beam: 9.50 ft (2.90 m)
- Engine: Universal Atomic 4 gasoline engine

Hull appendages
- Keel: fin keel
- Ballast: 3,200 lb (1,451 kg)
- Rudder: internally-mounted spade-type rudder

Rig
- Rig type: Bermuda rig
- I foretriangle height: 38.00 ft (11.58 m)
- J foretriangle base: 12.00 ft (3.66 m)
- P mainsail luff: 32.50 ft (9.91 m)
- E mainsail foot: 10.30 ft (3.14 m)

Sails
- Sailplan: masthead sloop
- Mainsail area: 167.38 sq ft (15.550 m^{2})
- Jib/genoa area: 228.00 sq ft (21.182 m^{2})
- Total sail area: 395.38 sq ft (36.732 m^{2})

Racing
- PHRF: 192

The Newport 28 is an American sailboat that was designed by C&C Design as a cruiser-racer and first built in 1974.

The design was developed into the Newport 28-2 in 1982.

== Production ==
The design was built by Capital Yachts in Harbor City, California, United States, from 1974 until 1981, but it is now out of production.

== Design ==
The Newport 28 is a recreational keelboat, built predominantly of fiberglass, with wood trim. It has a masthead sloop rig, a raked stem, a plumb transom, an internally mounted spade-type rudder controlled by a tiller or optional wheel and a fixed swept fin keel. It displaces 7,000 lb (3,175 kg) and carries 3,200 lb (1,451 kg) of ballast.

The boat has a draft of 4.50 ft (1.37 m) with the standard keel. The design may be fitted with a factory optional Universal Atomic 4 gasoline engine, Yanmar or Universal diesel engine, for docking and maneuvering.

The design has sleeping accommodation for five people, with a double "V"-berth in the bow cabin, two straight settee berths in the main cabin and an aft quarter berth. The galley had three optional locations: starboard main cabin, aft on the port or starboard side. The arrangement with the galley on aft, starboard side was the only one that included an oven. The cabin headroom is 72 in (183 cm).

The design has a hull speed of 6.7 kn (12.4 km/h) and a PHRF racing average handicap of 192.

== Operational history ==
The boat is raced in both Performance Handicap Racing Fleet and one-design competition.

In a 2000 used boat review for Practical Sailor, Darrell Nicholson concluded, "The Newport 28 is a good entry-level cruiser-racer for someone wanting a reasonable combination of accommodations and performance, as long as you’re not too persnickety about details. It would be a reasonable compromise for someone who likes more traditional appearance in a modern boat, but doesn’t have the money to spend for a higher-quality boat of the same size and type, such as a Sabre 28."

== See also ==
- List of sailing boat types

Related development

- Newport 28-2
