= Morgan Out Island 41 =

Sailboat class

Morgan Out Island 41 sloop
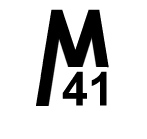
- Class symbol

Development
- Designer: Charley Morgan
- Location: United States
- Year: 1971
- No. built: 1000
- Builder: Morgan Yachts
- Role: Cruiser

Boat
- Displacement: 24,000 lb (10,886 kg)
- Draft: 4.17 ft (1.27 m)

Hull
- Type: Monohull
- Construction: Fiberglass
- LOA: 41.25 ft (12.57 m)
- LWL: 34.00 ft (10.36 m)
- Beam: 13.82 ft (4.21 m)
- Engine: Perkins Engines 62 hp (46 kW) diesel engine

Hull appendages
- Keel: long keel
- Ballast: 10,500 lb (4,763 kg)
- Rudder: keel-mounted rudder

Rig
- Rig type: Bermuda rig
- I foretriangle height: 49.00 ft (14.94 m)
- J foretriangle base: 17.00 ft (5.18 m)
- P mainsail luff: 42.25 ft (12.88 m)
- E mainsail foot: 17.00 ft (5.18 m)

Sails
- Sailplan: Masthead sloop
- Mainsail area: 359.13 sq ft (33.364 m^{2})
- Jib/genoa area: 416.50 sq ft (38.694 m^{2})
- Total sail area: 775.63 sq ft (72.058 m^{2})

Rating
- D-PN: 87.0
- PHRF: 192

The Morgan Out Island 41 is a family of American sailboats that was designed by Charley Morgan for cruising and first built in 1971.

== Production ==
The design was built by Morgan Yachts in the United States starting in 1970 and running until 1991, with more than 1,450 completed, but it is now out of production. At the height of production, Morgan Yachts was producing one OI 41 a day utilizing two assembly lines and cycling the molds during the night. At the time the company was employing 400 - 600 employees.

The series became one of the most commercially successful yacht designs in this size range. Nearly half of the production was purchased by yacht charter operators.

== Design ==
The Morgan Out Island 41 is a recreational keelboat, built predominantly of fiberglass, with teak wood trim. It has a masthead sloop or optional ketch rig with aluminum spars, a raked stem, a conventional transom, a center cockpit equipped with a ship's wheel for steering and a fixed long or fin keel.

There are many variations in layout, but the basic design has sleeping accommodation for seven people, with a double "V"-berth in the bow cabin, an L-shaped settee, with a folding table and a straight settee in the main cabin and an aft cabin with a double berth. The aft cabin is accessible from the main cabin or from the center cockpit directly, via its own companionway. The passageway between the aft cabin and the main cabin has a workbench on the port side and double doors to access the engine room on starboard. The galley is located on the starboard side just forward of the forward companionway ladder. The galley is L-shaped and is equipped with a two-burner alcohol-fired stove, a 7 cu ft (0.20 m^{3}) icebox and a double sink. A navigation station is opposite the galley, on the port side and has a second 10 cu ft (0.28 m^{3}) icebox below it. There are two heads, one in the bow cabin on the starboard side and one on the starboard side in the aft cabin, both with showers. The below deck trim is teak.

Ventilation is provided by a total of 14 opening ports, two opening ports on the transom, aft cabin, bow cabin and galley hatches. Light for the engine room is provided by a cockpit floor prism port light.

For sailing the design is equipped with full-length perforated toe-rails that can be used for jib sheeting. The cockpit sheeting winches are two-speed. There are halyard winches on the main mast and the mizzen mast. Both masts are provided with topping lifts. The bow is fitted with an anchor roller.

== Variants ==
Out Island 41
This masthead sloop model was introduced in 1971, with 1,000 boats completed. It has a length overall of 41.25 ft (12.6 m), a waterline length of 34.00 ft (10.4 m), displaces 24,000 lb (10,886 kg) and carries 10,500 lb (4,763 kg) of ballast. The boat has a draft of 4.17 ft (1.27 m) with the standard long keel. A stub keel and retractable centerboard model was also produced in small numbers. The boat is fitted with a British Perkins Engines 4-108 diesel engine of 62 hp (46 kW). Later boats produced were powered by a Westerbeke model 4-107 diesel or a Perkins 4-154 diesel. The fuel tank holds 138 U.S. gallons (520 L; 115 imp gal) and the fresh water tank has a capacity of 170 U.S. gallons (640 L; 140 imp gal). The design has a PHRF racing average handicap of 192 and a Portsmouth Yardstick of 87.0.
Out Island 41 Ketch
This ketch-rigged model was introduced in 1972. It has a length overall of 41.25 ft (12.6 m), a waterline length of 34.00 ft (10.4 m), displaces 24,000 lb (10,886 kg) and carries 10,500 lb (4,763 kg) of ballast. The boat has a draft of 4.17 ft (1.27 m) with the standard long keel. The boat is fitted with a British Perkins Engines diesel engine of 62 hp (46 kW). The fuel tank holds 138 U.S. gallons (520 L; 115 imp gal) and the fresh water tank has a capacity of 170 U.S. gallons (640 L; 140 imp gal).
Out Island 415
This masthead sloop model was introduced in 1975 and built until 1981, with 300 boats completed. It features a "walk-though" interior and could be ordered with an optional tall rig for sailing in areas with lighter winds. It has a length overall of 41.00 ft (12.5 m), a waterline length of 34.00 ft (10.4 m), displaces 27,000 lb (12,247 kg) and carries 9,000 lb (4,082 kg) of ballast. The boat has a draft of 4.20 ft (1.28 m) with the standard long keel. The boat is fitted with a British Perkins diesel engine. The fuel tank holds 138 U.S. gallons (520 L; 115 imp gal) and the fresh water tank has a capacity of 170 U.S. gallons (640 L; 140 imp gal).
Out Island 415 Ketch
This ketch-rigged model was introduced in 1977. It has a length overall of 41.00 ft (12.5 m), a waterline length of 34.00 ft (10.4 m), displaces 27,000 lb (12,247 kg) and carries 9,000 lb (4,082 kg) of ballast. The boat has a draft of 4.20 ft (1.28 m) with the standard long keel. The boat is fitted with a British Perkins diesel engine. The fuel tank holds 138 U.S. gallons (520 L; 115 imp gal) and the fresh water tank has a capacity of 170 U.S. gallons (640 L; 140 imp gal).
Out Island 416
This cutter or ketch-rigged model was introduced in 1981 to replace the 415 in production and was produced until 1985. It features a 7.00 ft (2.1 m) taller mast with increased sail area over earlier models. It has a length overall of 41.25 ft (12.6 m), a waterline length of 34.00 ft (10.4 m), displaces 27,000 lb (12,247 kg) and carries 9,000 lb (4,082 kg) of lead ballast. The boat has a draft of 4.16 ft (1.27 m) with the standard long keel. The boat is fitted with a British Perkins 4-154 diesel engine of 62 hp (46 kW).
Out Island 41 Classic (Morgan Classic 41)

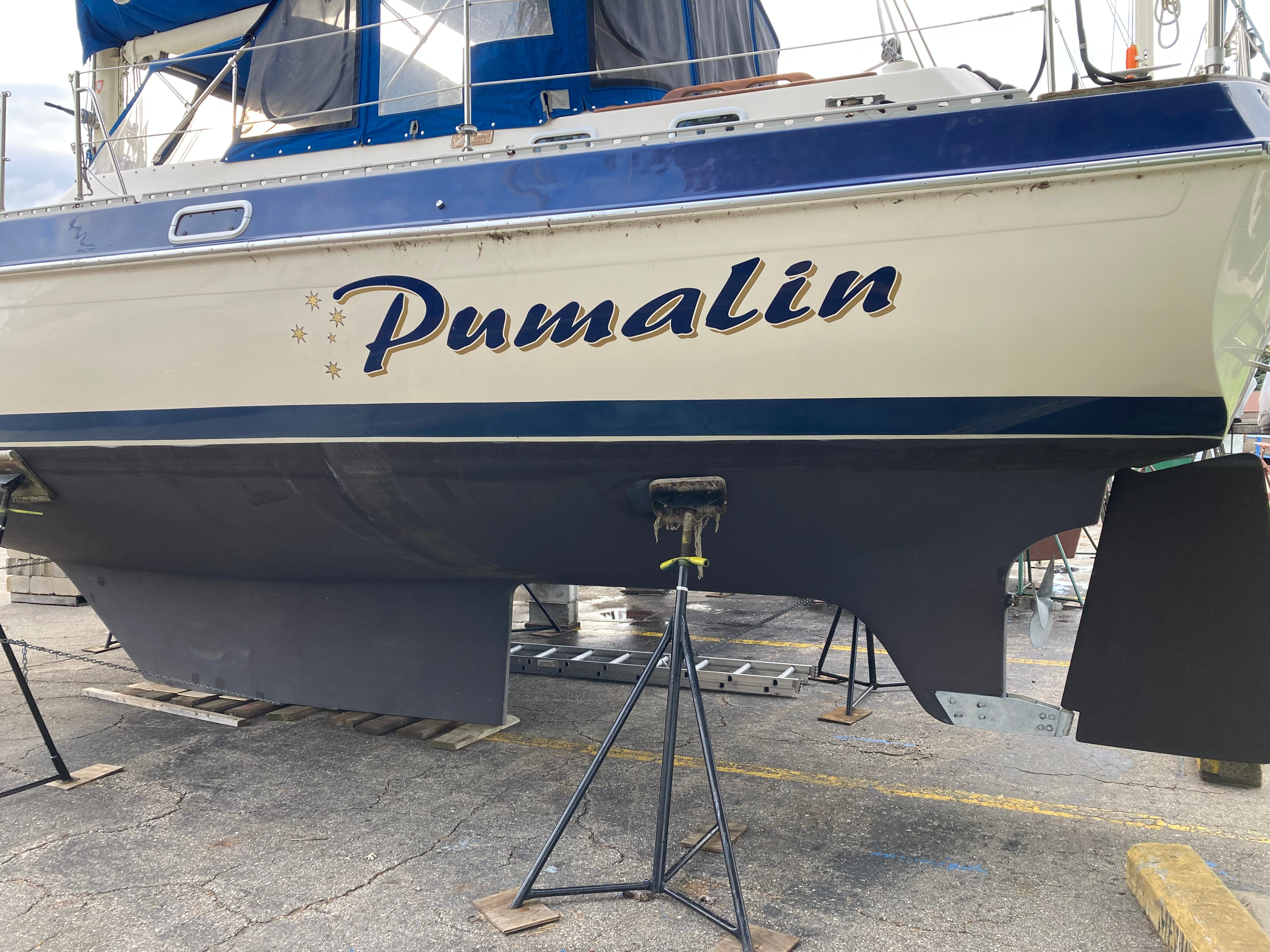
Example of modified keel on Morgan OI 41 Classic

This masthead sloop model was introduced in 1986 and built until 1991, with 150 boats completed. It was introduced after the manufacturer was bought out by Catalina Yachts and was sold as the Out Island 41 Classic and Morgan Classic 41. It differs from all the other boats in the series in having a fin keel and a skeg-mounted rudder in place of the long keel and keel-mounted rudder, plus a new deck design. It has a length overall of 41.25 ft (12.6 m), a waterline length of 34.00 ft (10.4 m), displaces 23,000 lb (10,433 kg) and carries 8,500 lb (3,856 kg) of ballast. The boat has a draft of 4.83 ft (1.47 m) with the standard keel. The boat is fitted with a Japanese Yanmar diesel engine. The fuel tank holds 85 U.S. gallons (320 L; 71 imp gal) and the fresh water tank has a capacity of 215 U.S. gallons (810 L; 179 imp gal).

== Operational history ==
In a 1994 review Richard Sherwood wrote, "the Morgan Out Island 41 is one of the world’s most popular cruising boats. Over 800 have been built, and the boat is used extensively in the charter industry. There is often roller furling for the jib, There are two double cabins that are really private main cabin with a double and a single; and in desperate cases, the nav station and workbench could be used for one person."

A 1996 review in the Spinsheet by marine surveyor Jack Hornor stated, "my reaction to the introduction of the Morgan Out Island 41 in 1972 was, to say the least, disappointment. At the time, I was working as an apprentice marine surveyor and although I had no formal training yet, I was a serious student of yacht design. Much of my spare time was spent studying the work of my favorite designers. I was a traditionalist, fond of the sweet sheer lines, near perfect balance, and classic elegance evident in the designs of Philip Rhodes, Bill Tripp, and Charlie Morgan. In much the same way that I felt Bob Dylan had sold out to pop culture by going electric, I felt Morgan had betrayed his traditional roots and sacrificed elegance and balance for volume and head room with his design of the Morgan Out Island 41. Well, times they are a changing. More than 25 years later, I have a whole different perspective on this design. Dylan did some pretty good stuff too. Pure traditionalists and lovers of all out sailing performance will still not be drawn to the pudgy appearance and less than stellar sailing performance of the Morgan Out Island 41, but time has proven that this is the most popular boat over 40' ever built. More than 1,000 are still sailing all around the world. No comparable boat even comes close to this success. Conservative estimates suggest that 30 to 35 percent of the Out Island 41s went into the charter trade, and I think it's safe to say more sailors have had an opportunity to sail this venerable cruising classic than any other boat over 40'."

In a 2010 review, writer Charles Diane said of the design, "the legendary designer/builder Charley Morgan allegedly conceived this boat in a fit of pique when the IOR supplanted the old CCA rule as the racing rule du jour back in 1970. If so it was an auspicious tantrum, as the Out Island 41 turned out to be an extremely successful boat and ultimately helped to transform the business of fiberglass sailboat production. The OI 41 was not only one of the first designs targeted at the emerging bareboat charter industry (the original "charter barge," if you will), it was also one of the first center-cockpit boats and one of the first to blatantly discount sailing performance in favor of maximum accommodation space."

== See also ==
- List of sailing boat types

Similar sailboats

- Dickerson 41
- Irwin 41
- Irwin 41 Citation
- Lord Nelson 41
- Nimbus 42
- Newport 41
