= Newport 27S =

Sailboat class

Development
- Designer: C&C Design
- Location: United States
- Year: 1974
- Builder: Capital Yachts
- Role: Cruiser

Boat
- Displacement: 6,000 lb (2,722 kg)
- Draft: 4.25 ft (1.30 m)

Hull
- Type: monohull
- Construction: fiberglass
- LOA: 27.00 ft (8.23 m)
- LWL: 2,233 ft (681 m)
- Beam: 9.16 ft (2.79 m)

Hull appendages
- Keel: fin keel
- Ballast: 2,400 lb (1,089 kg)
- Rudder: internally-mounted spade-type rudder

Rig
- Rig type: Bermuda rig
- I foretriangle height: 34.50 ft (10.52 m)
- J foretriangle base: 11.50 ft (3.51 m)
- P mainsail luff: 29.00 ft (8.84 m)
- E mainsail foot: 10.30 ft (3.14 m)

Sails
- Sailplan: masthead sloop
- Mainsail area: 149.35 sq ft (13.875 m^{2})
- Jib/genoa area: 198.38 sq ft (18.430 m^{2})
- Total sail area: 347.73 sq ft (32.305 m^{2})

The Newport 27S is an American sailboat that was designed by C&C Design as a cruiser and first built in 1974.

== Production ==
The design was built by Capital Yachts in Harbor City, California, United States, starting in 1974, but it is now out of production.

== Design ==
The Newport 27S is a recreational keelboat, built predominantly of fiberglass, with wooden trim. It has a masthead sloop rig, a raked stem plumb stem, a plumb transom, an internally mounted spade-type rudder controlled by a tiller and a fixed fin keel. It displaces 6,000 lb (2,722 kg) and carries 2,400 lb (1,089 kg) of ballast.

The boat has a draft of 4.25 ft (1.30 m) with the standard keel.

A tall mast was optional, with a mast that was about 2 ft (0.61 m) higher, for sailing in areas with lighter winds.

The design has a hull speed of 6.33 kn (11.72 km/h).

== See also ==
- List of sailing boat types
