= Newport 30 =

Sailboat class

Development
- Designer: Gary Mull
- Location: United States
- Year: 1968
- Builder: Lindsay Plastics/Capital Yachts Inc.
- Name: Newport 30

Boat
- Displacement: 7,500 lb (3,402 kg)
- Draft: 4.75 ft (1.45 m)

Hull
- Construction: Fiberglass
- LOA: 30.00 ft (9.14 m)
- LWL: 25.00 ft (7.62 m)
- Beam: 10.50 ft (3.20 m)
- Engine: Universal Atomic 30 hp (22 kW)

Hull appendages
- General: spade-type rudder
- Keel: fin keel
- Ballast: 2,500 lb (1,134 kg) of lead

Rig
- General: Masthead sloop
- I foretriangle height: 36.60 ft (11.16 m)
- J foretriangle base: 12.12 ft (3.69 m)
- P mainsail luff: 29.50 ft (8.99 m)
- E mainsail foot: 12.70 ft (3.87 m)

Sails
- Mainsail area: 187.33 sq ft (17.404 m^{2})
- Jib/genoa area: 221.80 sq ft (20.606 m^{2})
- Total sail area: 409.12 sq ft (38.008 m^{2})

Racing
- PHRF: 195 (average)

The Newport 30 is an American sailboat, that was designed by Gary Mull and first built in 1968. The design is out of production.

The Newport 30 design was developed into the Newport 31 in 1987.

== Production ==
The boat was built by Lindsay Plastics under their Capital Yachts Inc. brand in the United States, starting in 1968.

== Design ==
The Newport 30 is a small recreational and racing keelboat, built predominantly of fiberglass. It has a masthead sloop rig, an internally-mounted spade-type rudder and a fixed fin keel.

== Variants ==
Newport 30–1
This model is also called the "Mark I" and was built from 1968-1973. It displaces 7,500 lb (3,402 kg), carries 2,500 lb (1,134 kg) of lead ballast and has a draft of 4.75 ft (1.45 m) with its standard fin keel. It is fitted with a Universal Atomic gasoline engine of 30 hp (22 kW) and carries 16 U.S. gallons (61 L; 13 imp gal) of fuel and 25 U.S. gallons (95 L; 21 imp gal) of fresh water. The PHRF racing average handicap is 195 with a high of 211 and low of 189. It has a hull speed of 6.7 kn (12.41 km/h).
Newport 30–2
This model is also called the "Mark II" or "Phase II" and was modified to compete in the International Offshore Rule 3/4-ton race class, with a taller mast and shorter main sail boom. It was built starting in 1974. It displaces 8,000 lb (3,629 kg), carries 2,600 lb (1,179 kg) of lead ballast and has a draft of 4.75 ft (1.45 m) with its standard fin keel. It is fitted with a Universal Atomic 4 gasoline engine of 13 hp (10 kW) and carries 20 U.S. gallons (76 L; 17 imp gal) of fuel and 60 U.S. gallons (230 L; 50 imp gal) of fresh water. The PHRF racing average handicap is 183 with a high of 183 and low of 183. It has a hull speed of 6.7 kn (12.41 km/h).
Newport 30-2 SD
This model has a shoal-draft keel of 3.75 ft (1.14 m). It was built starting in 1974. It displaces 8,000 lb (3,629 kg), carries 2,600 lb (1,179 kg) of lead ballast. It is fitted with a Universal Atomic 4 gasoline engine of 13 hp (10 kW) and carries 20 U.S. gallons (76 L; 17 imp gal) of fuel and 60 U.S. gallons (230 L; 50 imp gal) of fresh water. The PHRF racing average handicap is 186 with a high of 205 and low of 174. It has a hull speed of 6.7 kn (12.41 km/h).
Newport 30–3
This model is also called the "Mark III" and was modified for cruising with its mast moved further aft, wheel steering replacing the earlier tiller, longer waterline length and a diesel engine. It was built starting in 1984. It displaces 8,500 lb (3,856 kg), carries 2,600 lb (1,179 kg) of ballast and has a draft of 5.17 ft (1.58 m) with its standard fin keel. It is fitted with a Universal M018 diesel engine and carries 30 U.S. gallons (110 L; 25 imp gal) of fuel and 70 U.S. gallons (260 L; 58 imp gal) of fresh water. It has a hull speed of 6.9 kn (12.78 km/h).
Newport 30-3 SD
This model has a shoal-draft keel, giving a draft of 4.00 ft (1.22 m). It was built starting in 1984. It displaces 8,500 lb (3,856 kg). The PHRF racing average handicap is 183 with a high of 180 and low of 186. It has a hull speed of 6.9 kn (12.78 km/h).
Newport 30-3 TM
This model has a taller mast. It was built starting in 1984. It displaces 8,500 lb (3,856 kg) and has a draft of 4.00 ft (1.22 m) with its standard fin keel. The PHRF racing average handicap is 180 with a high of 198 and low of 174. It has a hull speed of 6.9 kn (12.78 km/h).

== See also ==
- List of sailing boat types
