= Irwin 41 Citation =

Sailboat class

Development
- Designer: Ted Irwin
- Location: United States
- Year: 1982
- No. built: 4
- Builder: Irwin Yachts
- Role: Racer
- Name: Irwin 41 Citation

Boat
- Displacement: 17,500 lb (7,938 kg)
- Draft: 7.25 ft (2.21 m)

Hull
- Type: Monohull
- Construction: Fiberglass
- LOA: 40.77 ft (12.43 m)
- LWL: 33.28 ft (10.14 m)
- Beam: 13.04 ft (3.97 m)
- Engine: Yanmar 30 hp (22 kW) diesel engine

Hull appendages
- Keel: fin keel
- Ballast: 9,500 lb (4,309 kg)
- Rudder: spade-type rudder

Rig
- Rig type: Bermuda rig
- I foretriangle height: 54.90 ft (16.73 m)
- J foretriangle base: 17.00 ft (5.18 m)
- P mainsail luff: 47.50 ft (14.48 m)
- E mainsail foot: 13.50 ft (4.11 m)

Sails
- Sailplan: Masthead sloop
- Mainsail area: 320.63 sq ft (29.788 m^{2})
- Jib/genoa area: 466.65 sq ft (43.353 m^{2})
- Total sail area: 787.28 sq ft (73.141 m^{2})

The Irwin 41 Citation is an American sailboat that was designed by Ted Irwin as a racer and first built in 1982. The design was bases on a custom boat designed by Irwin, named Razzle Dazzle, which won the Southern Ocean Racing Conference (SORC) in 1982.

The Irwin 41 Citation is sometimes confused with the Irwin 41, a cruising sailboat design also introduced in 1982.

== Production ==
The design was built by Irwin Yachts in the United States. A total of four boats were built, starting in 1982, but it is now out of production.

== Design ==
The Irwin 41 Citation is a racing keelboat, built predominantly of fiberglass, with wood trim. It has a masthead sloop rig, a raked stem, a reverse transom, an internally mounted spade-type rudder controlled by a wheel and a fixed fin keel. It displaces 17,500 lb (7,938 kg) and carries 9,500 lb (4,309 kg) of lead ballast.

The boat has a draft of 7.25 ft (2.21 m) with the standard keel fitted.

The boat is fitted with a Japanese Yanmar diesel engine of 30 hp (22 kW) for docking and maneuvering. The fuel tank holds 20 U.S. gallons (76 L; 17 imp gal) and the fresh water tank has a capacity of 40 U.S. gallons (150 L; 33 imp gal).

The design has an aft cockpit for steering, but also has a center crew cockpit, separated by a structure that mounts the mainsheet traveler and ventilation intakes for below decks. The companionway ladder is at the front of the center cockpit.

The design has sleeping accommodation for eight people, with a double "V"-berth in the bow cabin, two straight settees in the main cabin both with pilot berths above them and an aft cabin with a double berth. The galley is located on the port side just forward of the companionway ladder. The galley is L-shaped and is equipped with a three-burner stove and a double sink. A navigation station is opposite the galley, on the starboard side. The head is located on the starboard side in the aft cabin, with a second door from the navigation station.

== Operational history ==
The boat is supported by an active class club, the Irwin Yacht Owners.

== See also ==
- List of sailing boat types

Similar sailboats

- Dickerson 41
- Irwin 41
- Lord Nelson 41
- Morgan Out Island 41
- Newport 41
- Nimbus 42
