= Ernest Tucker =

Canadian author, educator, and journalist (1931-2019)

- Born: Ernest Scott Tucker; 1931; Warwick, Bermuda, British West Indies
- Died: January 3, 2019 (aged 87–88); Châteauguay, Montreal, Quebec, Canada
- Occupation: Author
- Writing career
- Notable awards: CBC News Hall of Fame (2020)

Ernest Tucker was a Bermudian-born Canadian author, educator, and former journalist with the Canadian Broadcasting Corporation. Tucker is considered to be the first Black journalist at CBC.

== Early life and education ==
Ernest Scott Tucker was born in Warwick, Bermuda, in 1931.

He was the son of Benjamin Tucker and Eleanor Anderson, one of seven siblings, and named for his grandfather Ernest Scott Tucker, a founding member of the Bermuda Union of Teachers in 1919. His aunts Elmira Tucker Hunt (wife of Alma Hunt), May Johnston, and cousin Esther DeShields Pitt taught him at Spring Hill School in Warwick. His earliest employment was at Belmont Manor Hotel, working as a waiter under his father, the maître d'hôtel.

Tucker attended The Berkeley Institute in Pembroke Parish, Bermuda, until he was 14. He moved to Canada at 14 in the 1950s, following his older brother George, who earned a teaching scholarship in Toronto. He completed high school in Toronto and in 1954 became the first Black graduate of the journalism program at Ryerson Institute of Technology (now Toronto Metropolitan University). During his studies at Ryerson, Tucker interviewed entertainers for The Ryersonian, gaining experience with reporters in his final year. He used his backstage pass to cover the club circuit and interview celebrities including Nat King Cole, Vic Damone, Louis Armstrong, and Joe Louis. During his time as a trainee reporter, the journalism student also interviewed Broadway singer and dancer Josephine Baker.

== Career ==
After graduation, he traveled to Sudbury, Ontario, for a reporter interview, only to be told the job had already been "filled" when he got off of the bus. He spent the 1950s traveling between Canada and Bermuda, unable at first to be hired as a journalist in Canada. His early career included work for the Bermuda Recorder in the 1950s and for The Royal Gazette, first freelance and later as a staff member for roughly two years.

Returning to Canada, he initially attended McGill University but transferred to Sir George Williams College to write for the student newspaper, becoming news editor and then editor-in-chief. He worked nights at the Montreal Gazette and was active in theater and music, including leading the Ryerson Opera House Workshop and performing calypsos. He graduated with a Bachelor of Arts in 1958 and returned to Bermuda after struggling to find employment.

Tucker began his Canadian journalism career at the now-defunct Toronto Telegram after an editor discovered his work in Bermuda. A story he wrote for the Gazette attracted the attention of Ernest Bartlett, travel editor of the Toronto Telegram, who arranged for him to be flown to Toronto for an interview with publisher John W. H. Bassett.

He later left the paper to work at the Canadian Broadcasting Corporation in 1961. Tucker started his career at CBC in Toronto's radio newsroom. He became CBC's first Black reporter.

On November 22, 1963, while his supervisors were at lunch, he received the first reports of President Kennedy's assassination. After consulting the newsroom manual and failing to find instructions, he ran the story on air with an announcer. Despite being reprimanded, he was promoted to producer of Across Canada, working with Alex Trebek and Lloyd Robertson.

In 1964, he covered the Beatles' visit to Toronto, interviewing Ringo Starr on the runway. While at CBC, Tucker also edited the West Indian Reporter, Toronto's first Black newspaper.

His 1968 CBC interview with Stokely Carmichael in Montreal was a career highlight. Tucker was present in Montreal for John Lennon and Yoko Ono's 1969 bed-in for peace. Among his assignments were the 1960s civil rights movement and the 1970 Front de libération du Québec kidnapping of James Cross.

He relocated to Châteauguay, a suburb of Montreal, in 1970. Working for CBC's Montreal office, he was frequently on radio and at times on television.

While reporting, he simultaneously began working as a radio and journalism teacher at John Abbott College in 1972. Tucker had also begun a master's degree at Sir George Williams College (later Concordia University), finishing it in 1975.

Years later, he went on to author three novels, one published in 1994 and the other in 2004. He retired first from CBC in the mid-1990s and then from teaching in 2008.

== Death ==
Ernest Tucker died on January 3, 2019, at Anna-Laberge Hospital in Châteauguay, Montreal, Quebec, Canada, at the age of 87.

== Works ==
- Underworld Dwellers (1994)
- Lost Boundaries (2004)

== Awards and honors ==
Ernest Tucker was the first black reporter at The Royal Gazette.

Ernest Tucker was among the first Black people in the Canadian journalism industry. Tucker's career included being the first Black student at Ryerson's School of Journalism, first Black journalist at CBC, first to report Kennedy's assassination for CBC, and a reporter for Toronto's first Black newspaper.

He was among 12 Ryerson journalism alumni honored in 2013, the school's diamond anniversary year, for "Making A Mark" in their careers.

In 2020, Ernest Tucker was posthumously inducted into the CBC News Hall of Fame. He is the seventh inductee.
