= Coaming =

Upstand around a ship's hatch

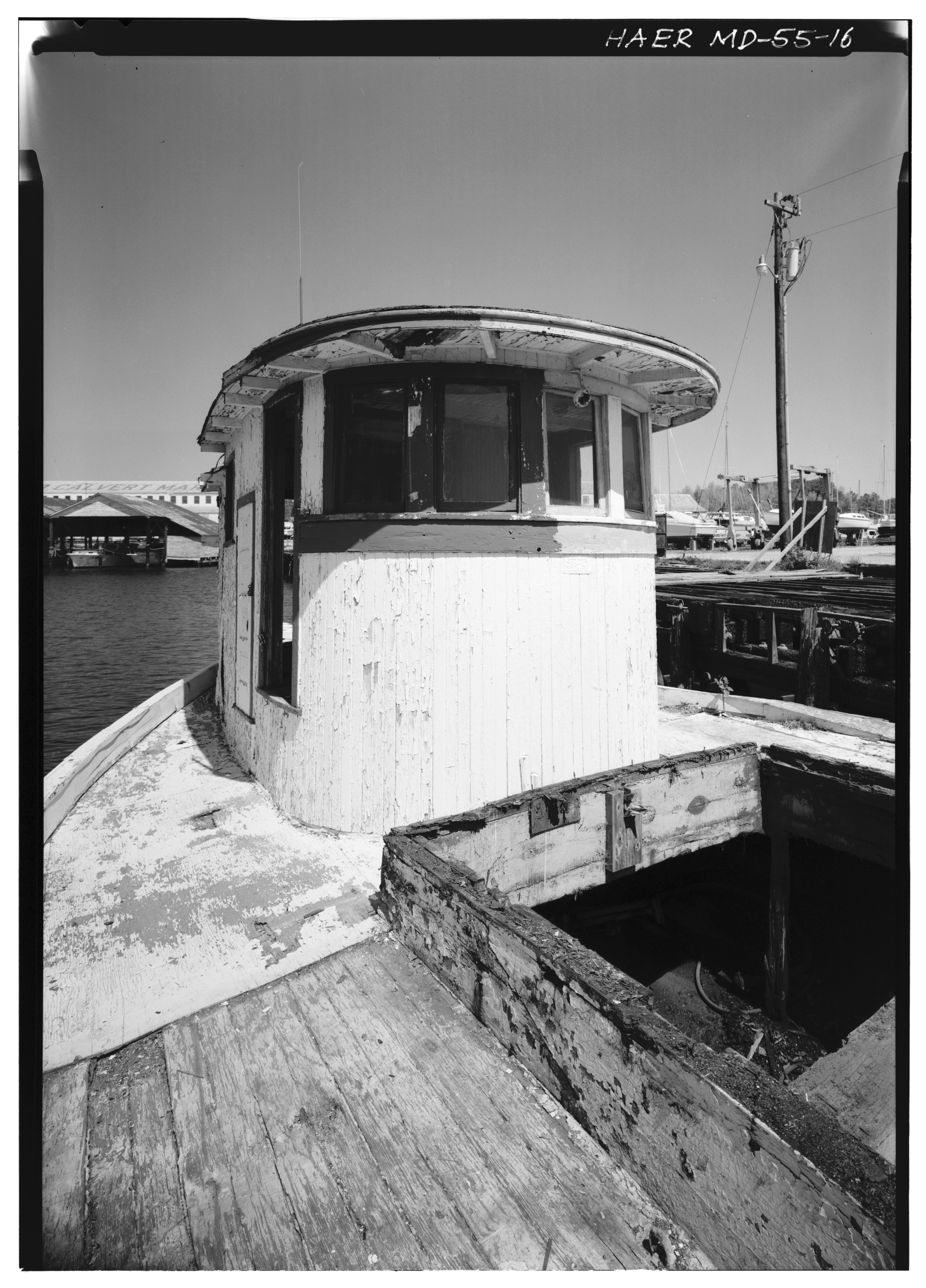
Hatch coaming (bottom right) on a bugeye

Coaming is any vertical surface on a ship designed to deflect or prevent entry of water. It usually consists of a raised section of deck plating around an opening, such as a cargo hatch. Coamings also provide a frame onto which to fit a hatch cover.

The protective metal sheeting or plating protecting against water entry into ventilation shafts in large ships is called a coaming as it fulfills the same water-deflection purpose.

The term was borrowed by the aviation industry to refer to a low rim around the opening for an unenclosed cockpit.

The origin of the term is unknown.

Coaming also refers to the raised structure around the cockpit of a kayak.
