= Cal 3-24 =

Sailboat class

CAL 24
Development
- Designer: C. Raymond Hunt Associates
- Location: United States
- Year: 1983
- Builder: Jensen Marine/Cal Yachts/Bangor Punta Corp.
- Role: Racer-Cruiser
- Name: CAL 24

Boat
- Displacement: 3,300 lb (1,497 kg)
- Draft: 4.25 ft (1.30 m)

Hull
- Type: monohull
- Construction: fiberglass
- LOA: 24.33 ft (7.42 m)
- LWL: 20.00 ft (6.10 m)
- Beam: 8.00 ft (2.44 m)
- Engine: outboard motor

Hull appendages
- Keel: fin keel
- Ballast: 1,175 lb (533 kg)
- Rudder: spade-type rudder

Rig
- Rig type: Bermuda rig
- I foretriangle height: 29.75 ft (9.07 m)
- J foretriangle base: 9.30 ft (2.83 m)
- P mainsail luff: 25.75 ft (7.85 m)
- E mainsail foot: 9.50 ft (2.90 m)

Sails
- Sailplan: masthead sloop
- Mainsail area: 122.31 sq ft (11.363 m^{2})
- Jib/genoa area: 138.34 sq ft (12.852 m^{2})
- Total sail area: 260.65 sq ft (24.215 m^{2})

Racing
- PHRF: 213

The Cal 24, also called the Cal 24-3 and the Cal 3-24 is an American trailerable sailboat that was designed by C. Raymond Hunt Associates as a racer-cruiser and first built in 1983.

The boat was an entirely new design to replace the C. William Lapworth-designed Cal 2-24 in the Cal Yachts product line.

The design was officially marketed by the manufacturer as the Cal 24, but is now often referred to as the Cal 3-24, Cal 24-3 or the Cal 24 (Hunt), to differentiate it from the unrelated 1958 Lapworth-designed Cal 24 and 1967 Cal 2-24. At the time of their market introduction each of these designs was sold under the designation of Cal 24.

== Production ==
The design was built by Cal Yachts in the United States, a brand of Jensen Marine, which was owned by Bangor Punta. The design was built from 1983 to 1985, but it is now out of production.

== Design ==
The design goals for the boat were an off-shore, blue water boat that could be legally ground-transported on a boat trailer.

The Cal 24 is a recreational keelboat, built predominantly of fiberglass, with wood trim. It has a masthead sloop rig; a raked stem; a raised counter, slightly reverse transom; a spade-type rudder controlled by a tiller and a fixed fin keel or shoal draft keel. It displaces 3,300 lb (1,497 kg) and carries 1,175 lb (533 kg) of lead ballast. The shoal draft keel model carries 1,400 lb (635 kg) of lead ballast.

The boat has a draft of 4.25 ft (1.30 m) with the standard keel and 3.33 ft (1.01 m) with the optional shoal draft keel.

The boat is normally fitted with a small 3 to 6 hp (2 to 4 kW) outboard motor for docking and maneuvering. A Yanmar 7.5 HP diesel with a 12 U.S. gallons (45 L; 10.0 imp gal) fuel tank was an option. The fresh water tank has a capacity of 15 U.S. gallons (57 L; 12 imp gal).

The design has sleeping accommodation for four people, with a double "V"-berth in the bow cabin and two straight settee quarter berths in the main cabin. A pull-out double berth for the port settee was an option. The galley is located on the starboard side just aft of the companionway ladder. The galley is equipped with a two-burner stove and a sink. The head is located just aft of bow "V"-berth on the port side; a hanging locker is to starboard. Ventilation is provided by a large forward deck hatch. Cabin headroom is 60 in (150 cm). An anchor locker is located in the bow.

The design has a PHRF racing average handicap of 213 and a hull speed of 6.0 kn (11.1 km/h).

== Operational history ==
In a 2010 review Steve Henkel wrote, "the Cal people asked yacht designer C. Raymond Hunt Associates to come up with "a true blue-water sailboat that would be physically and legally trailerable without special permits." The result was a choice of drafts: 4' 3" for the blue-water-customer contingent, or 3' 4" for the trailer boat folks. Well, both versions are trailerable, though not easily because of the draft. But then they didn't say the boat had to be easy to trailer, just legal. In general, the boat is in the mid- to upper-end in quality of construction, perhaps a cut above O'Day and on a par with Pearson, but below Pacific Seacraft. Best features: The iron bulb keel of the early Lapworth-designed Cal 24-2 was replaced by an external lead keel bolted to a stub in the Cal 24-3. Result: less maintenance, thinner section, lower center of gravity. Hardware is good quality throughout The big main hatch is a plus. Worst features: As with most reverse-transom boats, the outboard bracket on the transom is hard to reach from the cockpit. Standard winches are too small for fall-range sailing; Barient #19ST two-speed self-tailing winches were an extra cost option but worth it. A boom vang, also an extra-cost option, is a necessity too,"

== See also ==
- List of sailing boat types
