= Cal 2-25 =

Sailboat class

Development
- Designer: C. William Lapworth
- Location: United States
- Year: 1977
- No. built: 392
- Builder: Cal Yachts
- Name: Cal 2-25

Boat
- Displacement: 4,500 lb (2,041 kg)
- Draft: 4.50 ft (1.37 m)

Hull
- Type: Monohull
- Construction: Fiberglass
- LOA: 25.25 ft (7.70 m)
- LWL: 22.00 ft (6.71 m)
- Beam: 9.00 ft (2.74 m)
- Engine: Universal 11 hp (8 kW) diesel engine or Outboard motor

Hull appendages
- Keel: fin keel
- Ballast: 2,000 lb (907 kg)
- Rudder: internally-mounted spade-type rudder

Rig
- Rig type: Bermuda rig
- I foretriangle height: 33.00 ft (10.06 m)
- J foretriangle base: 11.00 ft (3.35 m)
- P mainsail luff: 28.00 ft (8.53 m)
- E mainsail foot: 9.50 ft (2.90 m)

Sails
- Sailplan: Masthead sloop
- Mainsail area: 133.00 sq ft (12.356 m^{2})
- Jib/genoa area: 181.50 sq ft (16.862 m^{2})
- Total sail area: 314.50 sq ft (29.218 m^{2})

The Cal 2-25 (also called the Cal 25-2 and Cal 25 Mark II) is an American sailboat that was designed by C. William Lapworth as a cruiser-racer and first built in 1977.

The design was marketed by the manufacturer as the 2-25 to differentiate it from the unrelated 1965 Cal 25 design.

== Production ==
The design was built by Cal Yachts, part of Jensen Marine and Bangor Punta, in the United States. A total of 392 examples were built between 1977 and 1983, but it is now out of production.

The design was also produced under license in Brazil as the Martinique 25.

== Design ==
The Cal 2-25 is a recreational keelboat, built predominantly of fiberglass, with teak wood trim and painted aluminum spars. It has a masthead sloop rig, a raked stem, a vertical transom, an internally mounted spade-type rudder mounted well aft, controlled by a tiller with an extension and a fixed fin keel. It displaces 4,500 lb (2,041 kg) and carries 2,000 lb (907 kg) of ballast.

The boat has a draft of 4.50 ft (1.37 m) with the standard keel and 3.50 ft (1.07 m) with the optional shoal draft keel.

The boat is normally fitted with a small outboard motor for docking and maneuvering or an optional Universal diesel engine of 11 hp (8 kW). The fuel tank holds 12.5 U.S. gallons (47 L; 10.4 imp gal) and the fresh water tank has a capacity of 21 U.S. gallons (79 L; 17 imp gal).

The boat's galley is located on both sides of the cabin. On the port side is a stainless steel sink and on the starboard a two-burner alcohol stove, which slides under the cockpit for stowage, along with a section of the counter. The head is a chemical type, with a marine toilet optional. It has a privacy door and is located forward, just aft of the bow "V"-berth. Additional sleeping space is provided by the dinette settee, which has a folding table, plus a berth under the sliding stove for a total sleeping accommodation for five people.

Ventilation is provided by a flush-mounted forward hatch and two opening ports in the head, while the cabin ports are fixed.

The boat has internally-mounted halyards, with internally-mounted reefing and an outhaul. The cockpit has two genoa winches and a third winch for the halyards. There is a standard boom vang and mainsheet traveler, which is mounted on the bridge deck. There is an anchor locker in the bow.

The design has a hull speed of 6.29 kn (11.65 km/h).

== Operational history ==
The Cal 2-25 was mostly sailed as a cruising sailboat and was not widely raced.

In a 1994 review, Richard Sherwood wrote, "Bill Lapworth designs boats with long waterlines, spade rudders, and moderate to light displacement. The result is a compromise between a cruiser and a racer."

In a 2010 review Steve Henkel wrote, "There is a large Cal 25 ... racing group and fan club centered up and down the West Coast, but they spurn the [2-25], which is a totally different design (though with a similar average PHRF rating). Best features: The Cal [2-25] is a well built boat with good headroom and a relatively roomy head. Worst features: No significant problems."

== See also ==
- List of sailing boat types
