= Crown 23 =

Sailboat class

Development
- Designer: C. William Lapworth
- Location: Canada
- Year: 1969
- Builder: Calgan Marine
- Name: Crown 23

Boat
- Displacement: 3,800 lb (1,724 kg)
- Draft: 4.08 ft (1.24 m)

Hull
- Type: Monohull
- Construction: Fiberglass
- LOA: 23.00 ft (7.01 m)
- LWL: 19.50 ft (5.94 m)
- Beam: 7.67 ft (2.34 m)
- Engine: Outboard motor

Hull appendages
- Keel: fin keel
- Ballast: 1,550 lb (703 kg)
- Rudder: internally-mounted spade-type rudder

Rig
- General: Masthead sloop
- I foretriangle height: 28.90 ft (8.81 m)
- J foretriangle base: 9.33 ft (2.84 m)
- P mainsail luff: 25.50 ft (7.77 m)
- E mainsail foot: 10.50 ft (3.20 m)

Sails
- Mainsail area: 133.88 sq ft (12.438 m^{2})
- Jib/genoa area: 134.82 sq ft (12.525 m^{2})
- Total sail area: 268.69 sq ft (24.962 m^{2})

The Crown 23 is a Canadian sailboat, that was designed by C. William Lapworth and first built in 1969.

The Crown 23 design was renamed the Calgan 23 in 1970.

The Crown 23 is thought to be a development of the slightly larger Cal 24-2, as Calgan Marine produced several other Cal Yachts designs under licence.

== Production ==
The boat was built by Calgan Marine in Canada and named for the street on which the factory was located, Crown Street in North Vancouver, BC. The design is now out of production.

== Design ==
The Crown 23 is a small recreational keelboat, built predominantly of fiberglass, with wood trim. It has a masthead sloop rig, an internally-mounted spade-type rudder and a fixed fin keel. It displaces 3,800 lb (1,724 kg) and carries 1,550 lb (703 kg) of ballast.

The boat has a draft of 4.08 ft (1.24 m) with the standard keel fitted. The Crown 23 is normally fitted with a small outboard motor for docking and maneuvering.

The boat has a hull speed of 5.92 kn (10.96 km/h).

== See also ==
- List of sailing boat types
