= Cal 24 =

Sailboat class

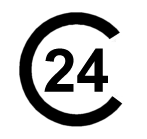

Development
- Designer: C. William Lapworth
- Location: United States
- Year: 1958
- No. built: 184
- Builder: Jensen Marine/Cal Yachts
- Role: Racer
- Name: Cal 24

Boat
- Displacement: 3,000 lb (1,361 kg)
- Draft: 4.50 ft (1.37 m) with centerboard down

Hull
- Type: monohull
- Construction: fiberglass
- LOA: 24.39 ft (7.43 m)
- LWL: 20.05 ft (6.11 m)
- Beam: 8.00 ft (2.44 m)
- Engine: outboard motor

Hull appendages
- Keel: modified long keel with centerboard
- Ballast: 1,000 lb (454 kg)
- Rudder: keel-mounted rudder

Rig
- Rig type: Bermuda rig
- I foretriangle height: 25.50 ft (7.77 m)
- J foretriangle base: 8.50 ft (2.59 m)
- P mainsail luff: 26.50 ft (8.08 m)
- E mainsail foot: 11.50 ft (3.51 m)

Sails
- Sailplan: fractional rigged sloop
- Mainsail area: 152.38 sq ft (14.157 m^{2})
- Jib/genoa area: 108.38 sq ft (10.069 m^{2})
- Total sail area: 260.75 sq ft (24.224 m^{2})

Racing
- Class association: MORC
- PHRF: 228

The Cal 24 is an American trailerable sailboat that was designed by C. William Lapworth as a Midget Ocean Racing Club (MORC) racer and first built in 1958.

The boat was one of the first fiberglass boats produced and the first Cal Yachts brand design produced by Jensen Marine.

The design was unrelated to the 1967 Lapworth Cal 2-24 design and the 1983 C. Raymond Hunt Associates-designed Cal 3-24.

== Production ==
The design was built by Cal Yachts in the United States, from 1958 to 1965 with 184 boats completed, but it is now out of production.

The design was sold as a complete ready-to-sail boat or as a kit for amateur construction.

== Design ==
The Cal 24 is a racing keelboat, built predominantly of fiberglass, with wood trim. It has a fractional sloop rig; a spooned, raked stem; a raised counter, angled transom; a keel-mounted rudder controlled by a tiller and a fixed, stub, modified, long keel with a cutaway forefoot and a retractable centerboard. It displaces 3,000 lb (1,361 kg) and carries 1,000 lb (454 kg) of ballast.

The boat has a draft of 4.50 ft (1.37 m) with the centerboard extended and 2.50 ft (0.76 m) with it retracted, allowing ground transportation on a trailer.

The boat is normally fitted with a small 3 to 6 hp (2 to 4 kW) outboard motor for docking and maneuvering.

The design has sleeping accommodation for four people, with a double "V"-berth in the bow cabin and two straight settee quarter berths in the main cabin. The galley is located on the port side just aft of the bow cabin. The galley is equipped with a stove and a sink. The head is located under the bow "V"-berth. Cabin headroom is 54 in (140 cm).

The design has a PHRF racing average handicap of 228 and a hull speed of 6.0 kn (11.1 km/h).

== Operational history ==
In a 2010 review Steve Henkel wrote, "best features: The hull is graceful, with springy sheer and relatively low freeboard, which minimizes undesirable windage ... Worst features: The beam of the Cal 24-1 is only 8 feet, making her Space Index the lowest among the comp[etitor]s. Plus, not all kit boats were finished to an acceptable standard of quality."

== See also ==
- List of sailing boat types
