= Cal T/4 =

Sailboat class

Development
- Designer: C. William Lapworth
- Location: Canada United States
- Year: 1971
- No. built: 238
- Builder: Cal Yachts
- Role: Racer
- Name: Cal T/4

Boat
- Displacement: 4,000 lb (1,814 kg)
- Draft: 4.00 ft (1.22 m)

Hull
- Type: monohull
- Construction: fiberglass
- LOA: 24.17 ft (7.37 m)
- LWL: 21.00 ft (6.40 m)
- Beam: 8.00 ft (2.44 m)
- Engine: outboard motor

Hull appendages
- Keel: fin keel
- Ballast: 2,000 lb (907 kg)
- Rudder: transom-mounted rudder

Rig
- Rig type: Bermuda rig
- I foretriangle height: 30.00 ft (9.14 m)
- J foretriangle base: 10.00 ft (3.05 m)
- P mainsail luff: 23.60 ft (7.19 m)
- E mainsail foot: 9.00 ft (2.74 m)

Sails
- Sailplan: masthead sloop
- Mainsail area: 106.20 sq ft (9.866 m^{2})
- Jib/genoa area: 150.00 sq ft (13.935 m^{2})
- Total sail area: 256.20 sq ft (23.802 m^{2})

Racing
- PHRF: 234

The Cal T/4 is an American trailerable sailboat that was designed by C. William Lapworth as an International Offshore Rule Quarter Ton class racer and first built in 1971.

== Production ==
The design was built by Cal Yachts, a brand of Jensen Marine in the United States. It was produced from 1971 to 1972 with 238 boats completed, but it is now out of production.

== Design ==
The Cal T/4 is a racing keelboat, built predominantly of fiberglass, with wood trim. It has a masthead sloop rig; a raked stem; a raised counter, reverse transom; a transom-hung rudder controlled by a tiller and a fixed fin keel. It displaces 4,000 lb (1,814 kg) and carries 2,000 lb (907 kg) of ballast.

The boat has a draft of 4.00 ft (1.22 m) with the standard keel and is normally fitted with a small 3 to 6 hp (2 to 4 kW) outboard motor for docking and maneuvering. Cabin headroom is 63 in (160 cm), but the cockpit has 78 in (200 cm) of headroom under the boom.

The design has a PHRF racing average handicap of 234 and a hull speed of 6.1 kn (11.3 km/h).

== Operational history ==
The design was raced on some Quarter on Class races in the 1970s and 1980, but was not noted as winning any of the larger competitions.

The boat is supported by an active racing club that organizes racing events, the Quarter Ton Class.

In a 2010 review Steve Henkel wrote, "the boat was named the T/4 for her builder’s intent that she do well in Quarter Ton racing. (We think she did fairly well in the few official Quarter Ton races staged in the 1970s and 1980s, but fell short of producing headlines.) Best features: With 4-foot deep fin keel, spade rudder, and 50 percent ballast to displacement ratio, she could run rings around the comp[etitor]s ... She has been described as an E-type Jag: robust, quick, agile, and fun. The high-aspect main is rigged far enough above the deck to give standing, headroom for tall people standing up in the cockpit (more than 6'6" clearance over the cockpit sole). Worst features: Compared with her comp[etitor]s, she has less headroom below, a lower Space Index, and perhaps lower directional stability (because of her relatively high aspect ratio keel)."

== See also ==
- List of sailing boat types
