= Cal 40 =

Sailboat class

Development
- Designer: Bill Lapworth
- Location: United States
- Year: 1963
- No. built: 108
- Builder: Jensen Marine
- Role: Offshore racer
- Name: Cal 40

Boat
- Displacement: 15,000 lb (6,804 kg)
- Draft: 5.58 ft (1.70 m)

Hull
- Type: monohull
- Construction: fiberglass
- LOA: 39.33 ft (11.99 m)
- LWL: 30.33 ft (9.24 m)
- Beam: 11.00 ft (3.35 m)
- Engine: Perkins Engines 4108 50 hp (37 kW) diesel engine

Hull appendages
- Keel: fin keel
- Ballast: 6,000 lb (2,722 kg)
- Rudder: internally-mounted spade-type rudder

Rig
- Rig type: Bermuda rig
- I foretriangle height: 46.00 ft (14.02 m)
- J foretriangle base: 15.20 ft (4.63 m)
- P mainsail luff: 40.00 ft (12.19 m)
- E mainsail foot: 17.50 ft (5.33 m)

Sails
- Sailplan: masthead sloop
- Mainsail area: 350.00 sq ft (32.516 m^{2})
- Jib/genoa area: 249.60 sq ft (23.189 m^{2})
- Total sail area: 699.60 sq ft (64.995 m^{2})

The Cal 40 is an American sailboat that was designed by Bill Lapworth as an offshore racer and first built in 1963.

The boat became an acclaimed racer and was also a commercial success. Sailboatdata terms it, "one of the most influential designs and successful racing boats ever".

== Production ==
The design was commissioned by George Griffith, a successful racing sailor, who was a member of Los Angeles Yacht Club. It is said that Griffith sketched the design on the back of a napkin and showed it to Bill Lapworth who designed the boat. The design was offered to a number of builders, who declined to build it. Griffith agreed to back the building of the first ten boats constructed, which convinced Jack Jensen to start production.

The design was built by Jensen Marine in the United States, from 1963 until 1971, with 108 boats completed, but it is now out of production.

== Design ==
The Cal 40 is a racing keelboat, built predominantly of fiberglass, with wood trim. It has a masthead sloop rig; a spooned, raked stem; a raised counter, transom; an internally mounted spade-type rudder controlled by a tiller and a fixed fin keel. It displaces 15,000 lb (6,804 kg) and carries 6,000 lb (2,722 kg) of lead ballast.

The flat-bottomed hull design allows sustained wave surfing and commensurate high speeds.

A raised-deck version was also designed, but, despite orders, only one was built and later orders were cancelled.

The boat has a draft of 5.58 ft (1.70 m) with the standard keel.

The boat is fitted with a British Perkins Engines 4108 diesel engine of 50 hp (37 kW) for docking and maneuvering.

The design has sleeping accommodation for eight people, with a double "V"-berth in the bow cabin, two straight settee berths and two pilot berths in the main cabin and two berth aft. The galley is located on the port side at the companionway ladder. A navigation station is opposite the galley, on the starboard side. The head is located just aft of the bow cabin on the port side.

For sailing downwind the design may be equipped with a symmetrical spinnaker.

The design has a hull speed of 7.38 kn (13.67 km/h).

== Operational history ==
The design has won many races, including the 1964 Southern Ocean Racing Conference, Newport Bermuda Race and the Transpacific Yacht Race, among others. Tom Burden notes, "Cal 40s have twice achieved the record of being the biggest one-design fleet ever in the biennial Transpac Race, with 14 boats in 1966 and 2005."

In a 2020 review Tom Burden wrote, "today the Cal 40 has attained true 'cult' status as a design that is sought after, restored and passed down through multiple generations of families. Try searching for Cal 40s that are for sale on Yachtworld and other sites, and you'll likely come up empty. Folks spend multiple years and a quarter of a million dollars restoring Cal 40s and fitting them out with the latest sails, gear and electronics ... The Cal 40 has endured because it is not only a relatively quick downwind raceboat, but also a sweet-sailing light cruiser that, in the words of Cal 40 owner Stan Honey, 'has no bad habits.' It steers beautifully under autopilot — plus it is rare to find a tiller-steered 40-ft sailboat, especially one with a light helm."

== See also ==
- List of sailing boat types
