= Calgan Marine =

Canadian sailboat manufacturer

Calgan Marine Limited
- Company type: Privately held company
- Industry: Boat building
- Founded: 1962; 64 years ago
- Founder: Al Nairne
- Defunct: 1979; 47 years ago
- Fate: Out of business
- Headquarters: North Vancouver, Canada
- Products: Sailboats

Calgan Marine was a Canadian boat builder that had its factory on Crown Street in North Vancouver. The company specialized in the design and manufacture of fiberglass sailboats.

The company was founded by Al Nairne in 1962 and ceased operations in 1979.

== History ==
Nairne saw a Cal 20 sailboat, built by Cal Yachts, while on a visit to California and convinced Jack Jensen of Jensen Marine to allow him to produce the boats under licence in Canada. The first design produced was the Cal 20, introduced in 1961.

During its 17 years in business, Calgan produced 300 examples of Cal Yachts designs. The company also developed its own designs, including the Crown 28, based on the Cal 2-27.

== Boats ==
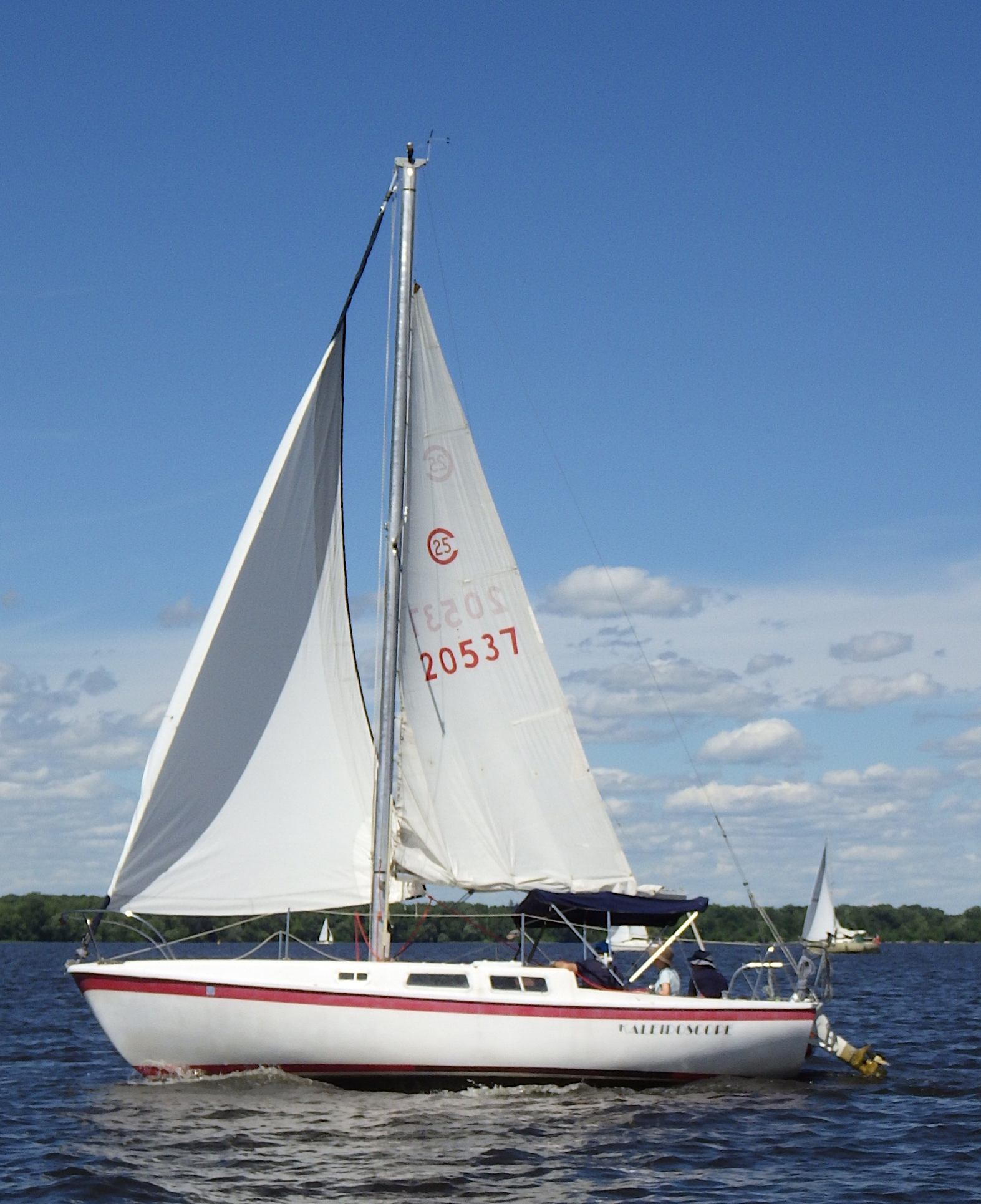
A Cal 25 sailboat on Lac Deschênes, part of the Ottawa River in Canada.

Summary of boats built by Calgan Marine:

- Cal 20 - 1961
- Cal 28 - 1963
- Cal 25 - 1965
- Crown 23 - 1969
- Calgan 23 - 1970
- Cal 29 - 1971
- Crown 34 - 1975
- Crown 28 - 1976

== See also ==
- List of sailboat designers and manufacturers
