= Crown 28 =

Sailboat class

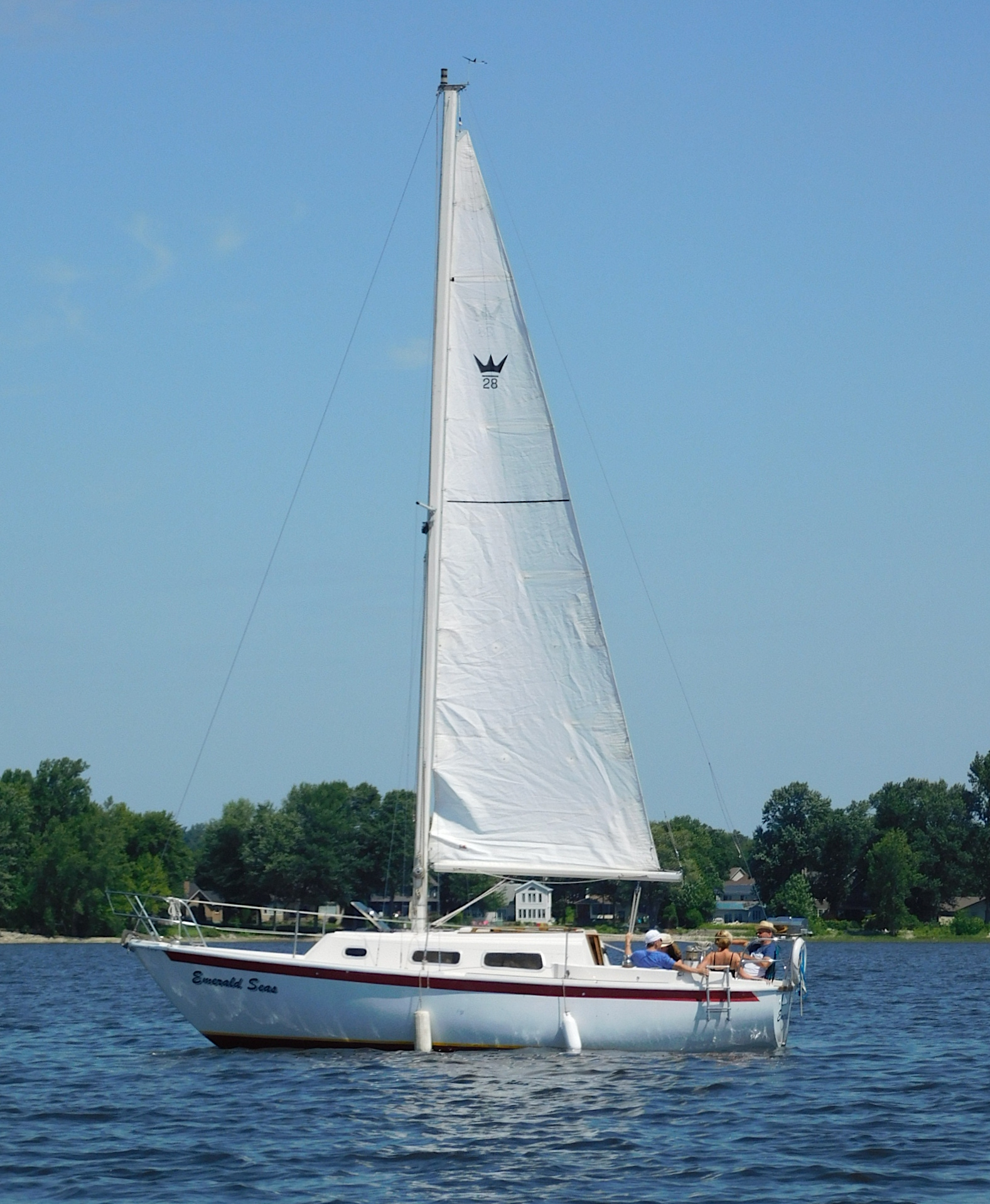

Development
- Designer: C. William Lapworth and Al Nairne
- Location: Canada
- Year: 1976
- Builder: Calgan Marine
- Name: Crown 28

Boat
- Displacement: 6,700 lb (3,039 kg)
- Draft: 4.83 ft (1.47 m)

Hull
- Type: Monohull
- Construction: Fiberglass
- LOA: 27.75 ft (8.46 m)
- LWL: 23.33 ft (7.11 m)
- Beam: 8.83 ft (2.69 m)
- Engine: Inboard motor

Hull appendages
- Keel: fin keel
- Ballast: 2,900 lb (1,315 kg)
- Rudder: internally-mounted spade-type rudder

Rig
- General: Masthead sloop
- I foretriangle height: 36.67 ft (11.18 m)
- J foretriangle base: 11.83 ft (3.61 m)
- P mainsail luff: 31.00 ft (9.45 m)
- E mainsail foot: 10.00 ft (3.05 m)

Sails
- Mainsail area: 155.00 sq ft (14.400 m^{2})
- Jib/genoa area: 216.90 sq ft (20.151 m^{2})
- Total sail area: 371.90 sq ft (34.551 m^{2})

The Crown 28 is a Canadian sailboat, that was designed by naval architect C. William Lapworth in conjunction with Calgan Marine founder Al Nairne and first built in 1976.

Calgan Marine had produced several Cal Yachts designs under licence and the Crown 28 is a development of the 1974 Cal 2-27.

== Production ==
The boat was built by Calgan Marine in North Vancouver, British Columbia, Canada, but it is now out of production.

== Design ==
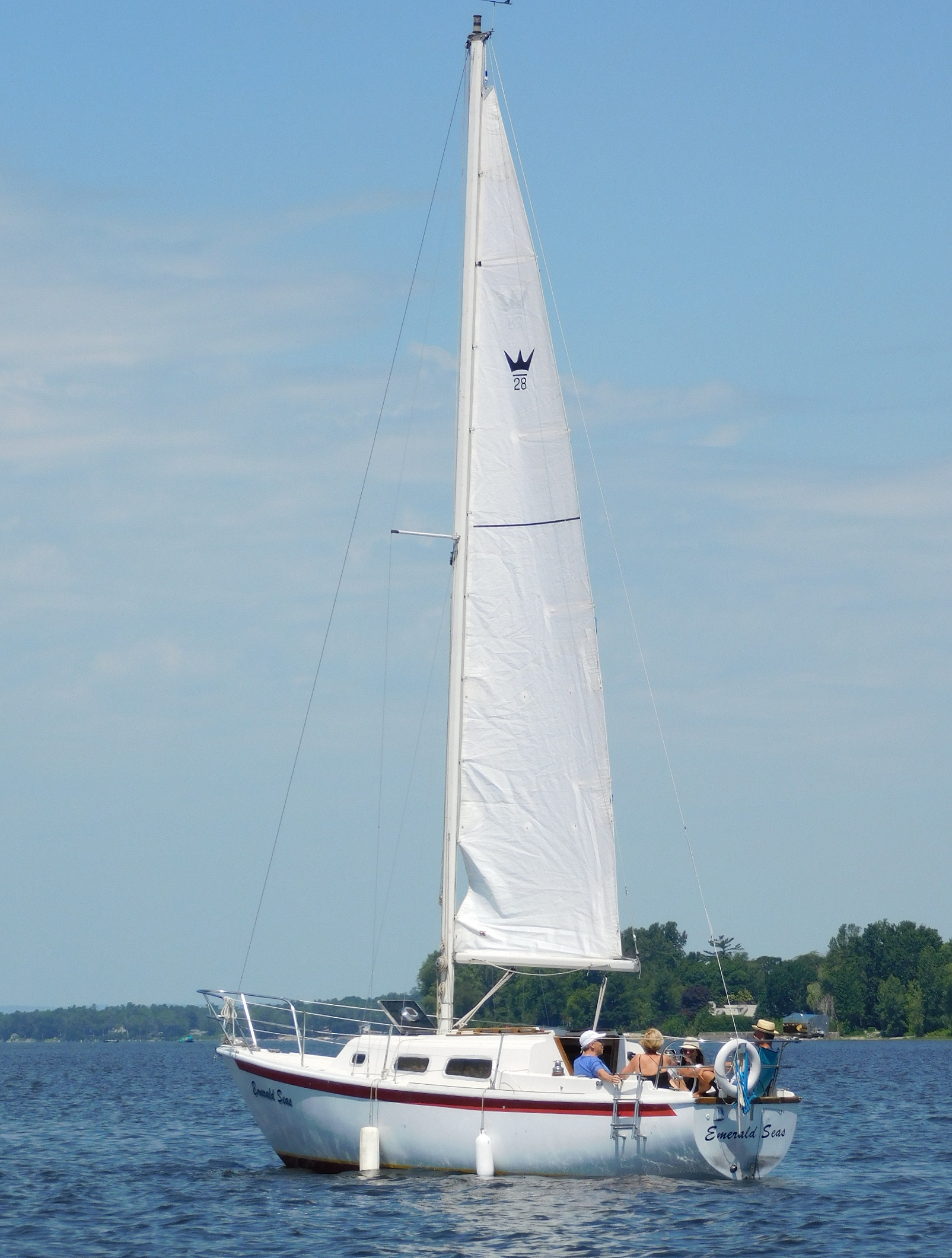
Crown 28

The Crown 28 is a small recreational keelboat, built predominantly of fiberglass, with wood trim. It has a masthead sloop rig, inboard engine, an internally-mounted spade-type rudder and a fixed fin keel. It displaces 6,700 lb (3,039 kg) and carries 2,900 lb (1,315 kg) of ballast.

The boat has a draft of 4.83 ft (1.47 m) with the standard keel fitted. The fuel tank holds 12 U.S. gallons (45 L; 10.0 imp gal) and the fresh water tank has a capacity of 25 U.S. gallons (95 L; 21 imp gal).

The boat has a hull speed of 6.47 kn (11.98 km/h).

== See also ==
- List of sailing boat types

Related development

- Cal 2-27

Similar sailboats

- Aloha 27
- Aloha 28
- C&C 27
- Catalina 27
- Catalina 270
- Catalina 275 Sport
- CS 27
- Edel 820
- Express 27
- Fantasia 27
- Halman Horizon
- Hotfoot 27
- Hullmaster 27
- Hunter 27
- Hunter 27-2
- Hunter 27-3
- Island Packet 27
- Mirage 27 (Perry)
- Mirage 27 (Schmidt)
- O'Day 28
- O'Day 272
- Sabre 28
- Tanzer 27
- Watkins 27
- Watkins 27P
