= Cal 21 =

Sailboat class

Development
- Designer: C. William Lapworth
- Location: United States
- Year: 1969
- No. built: 500
- Builder: Jensen Marine/Cal Yachts
- Role: Cruiser
- Name: Cal 21

Boat
- Displacement: 1,100 lb (499 kg)
- Draft: 4.30 ft (1.31 m) with the keel down

Hull
- Type: monohull
- Construction: fiberglass
- LOA: 20.50 ft (6.25 m)
- LWL: 16.67 ft (5.08 m)
- Beam: 6.67 ft (2.03 m)
- Engine: outboard motor

Hull appendages
- Keel: swing keel
- Ballast: 360 lb (163 kg)
- Rudder: transom-mounted rudder

Rig
- Rig type: Bermuda rig
- I foretriangle height: 23.00 ft (7.01 m)
- J foretriangle base: 8.50 ft (2.59 m)
- P mainsail luff: 23.00 ft (7.01 m)
- E mainsail foot: 8.50 ft (2.59 m)

Sails
- Sailplan: fractional rigged sloop
- Mainsail area: 97.75 sq ft (9.081 m^{2})
- Jib/genoa area: 97.75 sq ft (9.081 m^{2})
- Total sail area: 195.50 sq ft (18.163 m^{2})

Racing
- PHRF: 258

The Cal 21 is an American trailerable sailboat that was designed by C. William Lapworth as a cruiser and first built in 1969.

== Production ==
The design was built by Jensen Marine/Cal Yachts, a division of Bangor Punta Corp. in the United States. Production ran from 1969 to 1976, with 500 boats completed, but it is now out of production.

== Design ==
The Cal 21 is a recreational keelboat, built predominantly of fiberglass, with wood trim. It has a fractional sloop rig; a raked stem; a reverse transom; a transom-hung mahogany, non-folding rudder, controlled by a tiller and a swing keel. It displaces 1,100 lb (499 kg) and carries 360 lb (163 kg) of ballast.

The boat has a draft of 4.30 ft (1.31 m) with the keel extended and 10 in (25 cm) with it retracted, allowing beaching or ground transportation on a trailer.

The swing keel is lowered from a slot in the hull, which is then plugged with a cover that sealed the opening to reduce drag. The cable to raise the keel had to be reattached to lower or raise the keel.

The boat is normally fitted with a small 3 to 6 hp (2 to 4 kW) outboard motor for docking and maneuvering.

The design has sleeping accommodation for four people, with a double "V"-berth in the bow cabin and two quarter berths in the main cabin. The head is located under the "V"-berth in the bow cabin on the starboard side. Cabin headroom is 49 in (120 cm).

The design has a PHRF racing average handicap of 258 and a hull speed of 5.5 kn (10.2 km/h).

== Operational history ==
In a 2010 review Steve Henkel wrote, "In good weather a pair of sleepers can be accommodated on her unusually spacious (eight feet long) cockpit seats, Worst features: The mahogany rudder is detachable but not folding, a potential problem in shallows. The iron keel is subject to pitting and rust. The keel hoisting system is said by some owners to be a weakness."

== See also ==
- List of sailing boat types
