= Cal 29 =

Sailboat class

Development
- Designer: William Lapworth
- Location: United States
- Year: 1971
- No. built: 624
- Builders: Cal Yachts; Calgan Marine
- Name: Cal 29

Boat
- Displacement: 8,000 lb (3,629 kg)
- Draft: 4.50 ft (1.37 m)

Hull
- Type: Monohull
- Construction: Fiberglass
- LOA: 29.00 ft (8.84 m)
- LWL: 24.00 ft (7.32 m)
- Beam: 9.25 ft (2.82 m)
- Engine: Universal Atomic 4 30 hp (22 kW) gasoline engine

Hull appendages
- Keel: fin keel
- Ballast: 3,350 lb (1,520 kg)
- Rudder: internally-mounted spade-type rudder

Rig
- General: Masthead sloop
- I foretriangle height: 37.00 ft (11.28 m)
- J foretriangle base: 12.33 ft (3.76 m)
- P mainsail luff: 31.67 ft (9.65 m)
- E mainsail foot: 12.25 ft (3.73 m)

Sails
- Mainsail area: 193.98 sq ft (18.021 m^{2})
- Jib/genoa area: 228.11 sq ft (21.192 m^{2})
- Total sail area: 422.08 sq ft (39.213 m^{2})

Racing
- PHRF: 183 (average)

The Cal 29 is an American sailboat, that was designed by William Lapworth and first built in 1971.

A special cruising version was designated as the Cal 2-29.

== Production ==
The boat was built by Cal Yachts in the United States, between 1971 and 1974, but it is now out of production.

The design was also built under licence by Calgan Marine in North Vancouver, Canada.

A total of 624 examples of the type were completed, making the Cal 29 one of the most commercially successful models built by Cal Yachts.

== Design ==
The Cal 29 is a small recreational keelboat, built predominantly of fiberglass, with wood trim. It has a masthead sloop rig, an internally-mounted spade-type rudder and a fixed fin keel. It displaces 8,000 lb (3,629 kg) and carries 3,350 lb (1,520 kg) of ballast.

The boat has a draft of 4.50 ft (1.37 m) with the standard keel fitted.

The boat is fitted with a Universal Atomic 4 30 hp (22 kW) gasoline engine. The fuel tank holds 20 U.S. gallons (76 L; 17 imp gal) and the fresh water tank also has a capacity of 20 U.S. gallons (76 L; 17 imp gal).

The boat has a PHRF racing average handicap of 183 with a high of 198 and low of 180. It has a hull speed of 6.56 kn (12.15 km/h).

== Variants ==
The Cal 2-29 was a special cruising version of the basic Cal 29, with the same hull and rigging. It added a Farymann 12 hp (9 kW) diesel engine, a pressurized shower, pedestal steering, a vanity with medicine chest, electric bilge pump, an extra water tank giving a total of 40 U.S. gallons (150 L; 33 imp gal) of fresh water and a shore power system, all as standard equipment. A total of 387 of this model were built between 1974 and 1974-1978.

== See also ==
- List of sailing boat types
