= Gladiator 24 =

Sailboat class

Development
- Designer: Bill Lapworth
- Location: United States
- Year: 1958
- Builder: Continental Plastics
- Role: Racer-Cruiser
- Name: Gladiator 24

Boat
- Displacement: 3,850 lb (1,746 kg)
- Draft: 4.00 ft (1.22 m)

Hull
- Type: monohull
- Construction: fiberglass
- LOA: 24.00 ft (7.32 m)
- LWL: 20.00 ft (6.10 m)
- Beam: 7.50 ft (2.29 m)
- Engine: outboard motor

Hull appendages
- Keel: modified long keel
- Ballast: 2,050 lb (930 kg)
- Rudder: keel-mounted rudder

Rig
- Rig type: Bermuda rig
- I foretriangle height: 26.75 ft (8.15 m)
- J foretriangle base: 9.00 ft (2.74 m)
- P mainsail luff: 30.50 ft (9.30 m)
- E mainsail foot: 10.25 ft (3.12 m)

Sails
- Sailplan: fractional rigged sloop
- Mainsail area: 156.31 sq ft (14.522 m^{2})
- Jib/genoa area: 120.38 sq ft (11.184 m^{2})
- Total sail area: 276.69 sq ft (25.705 m^{2})

Racing
- PHRF: 249

The Gladiator 24 is an American trailerable sailboat that was designed by Bill Lapworth as a racer-cruiser and first built in 1958.

The Gladiator 24 is a development of the Lapworth 24, with a shorter mast and a raised deck.

== Production ==
The design was built by Continental Plastics in Costa Mesa, California, United States, starting in 1958, but is now out of production.

== Design ==
The Gladiator 24 is a recreational keelboat, built predominantly of fiberglass, with wood trim. It has a fractional sloop rig; a spooned, raked stem, a raised counter, angled transom; a keel-mounted rudder controlled by a tiller and a fixed modified long keel, with a cut-away forefoot. It displaces 3,850 lb (1,746 kg) and carries 2,050 lb (930 kg) of ballast.

The boat has a draft of 4.00 ft (1.22 m) with the standard keel.

The boat is normally fitted with a small 3 to 6 hp (2 to 4 kW) outboard motor for docking and maneuvering.

The design has sleeping accommodation for four people, with a double "V"-berth in the bow cabin, a straight settee on the port side of the main cabin and an aft quarter berth on the starboard side. The galley is located on the port side just forward of the companionway ladder and is equipped with an icebox and a sink. The head is located centered under the bow cabin "V"-berth. Cabin headroom is 57 in (140 cm).

For sailing the design may be equipped with either a jib or genoa foresail.

The design has a PHRF racing average handicap of 249 and a hull speed of 6.0 kn (11.1 km/h).

== Operational history ==
In a 2010 review Steve Henkel wrote, "somewhere around 1958 yacht designer William Lapworth drew two boats for the Continental Plastics Corporation of Costa Mesa, CA: the Lapworth 24 (or L24) and the Gladiator 24, The L24 ... featured a longish trunk cabin and the Gladiator had a raised deck; otherwise both vessels looked very similar, with hulls of the same overall dimensions and exactly, or very nearly exactly, the same shape. Both were good on the race course, at least in heavy air, and with their relatively long and deep keels were weatherly and seaworthy. Both boats drew raves from California sailors. Best features: For her day—remember, fiberglass boats were being designed and built for the first time in the late 1950s—the Gladiator was right at the forefront of technology. Worst features: The keel, based on traditional 1950s knowledge of what worked on a sailboat, had a bit too much wetted surface to attain spectacular speeds, especially in light air. Lapworth figured out that a boat with a fin keel with a lot less wetted surface and somewhat less ballast would be better than the Gladiator or L24 as an all-round racing-cruising boat. The result was the Cal 24-2 ..."

== See also ==
- List of sailing boat types
