= Metcalf (dinghy) =

Sailboat class

Development
- Designer: Bill Lapworth
- Location: United States
- Year: 1960
- No. built: 450
- Builder: W. D. Schock Corp
- Role: Racer
- Name: Metcalf

Boat
- Displacement: 130 lb (59 kg)
- Draft: 3.00 ft (0.91 m) with daggerboard down

Hull
- Type: monohull
- Construction: fiberglass
- LOA: 13.00 ft (3.96 m)
- LWL: 12.00 ft (3.66 m)
- Beam: 4.49 ft (1.37 m)

Hull appendages
- Keel: daggerboard
- Rudder: transom-mounted rudder

Rig
- Rig type: Bermuda rig

Sails
- Sailplan: catboat
- Mainsail area: 93.00 sq ft (8.640 m^{2})
- Total sail area: 93.00 sq ft (8.640 m^{2})

The Metcalf is an American sailboat that was designed by Bill Lapworth as a racer and first built in 1960. The boat is named for Darby Metcalf who built the first example.

== Production ==
The design was built by W. D. Schock Corp in the United States, starting in 1960, with 450 boats completed, but it is now out of production.

== Design ==
The Metcalf is a racing, planing, sailing dinghy, built predominantly of fiberglass, with wood trim. It has a cat rig with an anodized aluminum mast and stainless steel standing rigging. The hull has a raked stem, a plumb transom, a transom-hung rudder controlled by a tiller and a retractable daggerboard. It displaces 130 lb (59 kg).

The boat has a draft of 3.00 ft (0.91 m) with the daggerboard extended and 6 in (15 cm) with it retracted, allowing operation in shallow water, beaching or ground transportation on a trailer or car roof top.

The design has a hull speed of 4.64 kn (8.59 km/h).

== See also ==
- List of sailing boat types
