= Newport 16 =

American keelboat first built in 1965

Development
- Designer: Bill Lapworth
- Location: United States
- Year: 1965
- Builders: Newport Boats; Lockley Newport Boats; Gloucester Yachts; Capital Yachts
- Role: Cruiser
- Name: Newport 16

Boat
- Displacement: 750 lb (340 kg)
- Draft: 3.75 ft (1.14 m)

Hull
- Type: monohull
- Construction: fiberglass
- LOA: 15.58 ft (4.75 m)
- LWL: 13.67 ft (4.17 m)
- Beam: 6.25 ft (1.91 m)
- Engine: outboard motor

Hull appendages
- Keel: swing keel
- Ballast: 250 lb (113 kg)
- Rudder: transom-mounted rudder

Rig
- Rig type: Bermuda rig
- I foretriangle height: 15.25 ft (4.65 m)
- J foretriangle base: 7.25 ft (2.21 m)
- P mainsail luff: 18.00 ft (5.49 m)
- E mainsail foot: 9.75 ft (2.97 m)

Sails
- Sailplan: fractional rigged sloop
- Mainsail area: 87.75 sq ft (8.152 m^{2})
- Jib/genoa area: 55.28 sq ft (5.136 m^{2})
- Total sail area: 143.03 sq ft (13.288 m^{2})

The Newport 16 is a recreational keelboat first built in 1965 by Newport Boats, Lockley Newport Boats, Gloucester Yachts and Capital Yachts in the United States, and is now out of production.

It was also made and marketed as the Newport 16, the Lockley Newport 16, the Gloucester 16, and in modified form, as the Neptune 15.

Designed by Bill Lapworth, the fiberglass hull has a raked stem, a slightly angled transom, a transom-hung rudder controlled by a tiller and a fixed fin keel or swing keel.

It has a fractional sloop masthead sloop rig. A good-sized sail plan and relatively big cockpit make it a suitable daysailer.

The design has sleeping accommodation for two adults and two children, with a small double "V"-berth in the bow cabin and two straight settee quarter berths in the main cabin. There are no provisions for a galley. The head is located under the bow "V"-berth. Cabin headroom is 48 in (120 cm).

The design has a hull speed of 5.0 kn (9.3 km/h).

== Variants ==
Newport 16 and Lockley Newport 16
This model was produced by Newport Boats, later called Lockley Newport Boats and introduced in 1965. It has a length overall of 15.58 ft (4.7 m), a waterline length of 13.67 ft (4.2 m), displaces 750 lb (340 kg) and carries 250 lb (113 kg) of ballast. The fin keel-equipped version of the boat has a draft of 2.5 ft (0.76 m), while the swing keel-equipped version has a draft of 3.75 ft (1.14 m) with the keel extended and 1.75 ft (0.53 m) with it retracted, allowing operation in shallow water, beaching or ground transportation on a trailer.

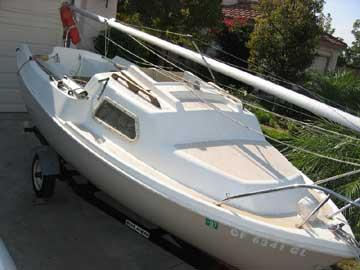
Neptune 16, showing the two-step coach house roof shape

Neptune 16
This model was produced Capital Yachts by and introduced in 1981. It has a revised "two step" coach house roof shape. The boat has a length overall of 15.75 ft (4.8 m), a waterline length of 13.50 ft (4.1 m), displaces 900 lb (408 kg) and carries 200 lb (91 kg) of ballast in the swing keel version. The fin keel version carries 275 lb (125 kg) of ballast. The swing keel-equipped version has a draft of 4.00 ft (1.22 m) with the keel extended and 0.83 ft (0.25 m) with it retracted, while the fin keel-equipped version of the boat has a draft of 2.5 ft (0.76 m).
Gloucester 16
This model was produced by Gloucester Yachts, introduced in 1986 and produced until 1989, with 1,300 boats completed. It has a length overall of 15.58 ft (4.7 m), a waterline length of 14.00 ft (4.3 m), displaces 900 lb (408 kg) and carries 200 lb (91 kg) of iron ballast. The fin keel-equipped version of the boat has a draft of 2.5 ft (0.76 m), while the swing keel-equipped version has a draft of 3.75 ft (1.14 m) with the keel extended and 0.75 ft (0.23 m) with it retracted.
