= Raritan Yacht Club =

Historic yacht club in NJ

- Full name: Raritan Yacht Club
- Founded: 1865; 161 years ago
- Website: www.ryc.org

The Raritan Yacht Club (RYC), located in Perth Amboy, New Jersey, is the second oldest yacht club in New Jersey, and is thought to be one of the oldest yacht clubs in the United States.

== History ==
Founded in 1865, The Raritan Yacht Club came into existence via a merger of two smaller local boat clubs: the Carteret Boat Club (founded in 1865 and included mostly canoes and rowing) and the Perth Amboy Yacht Club (founded in 1874 and included mostly sailboats). Both clubs utilized waterfront buildings near to each other. The original Carteret Boat Club was housed in a one-room building containing a pot-belly stove, some canoes hanging from slings, and a porch where members would sit in rocking chairs watching the boats on the water. The original Perth Amboy Yacht Club consisted mostly of prominent citizens with sailboats—though their numbers were relatively few—with a clubhouse located not far from the Carteret Boat Club. As they both eventually faced near-bankruptcy, the two clubs merged in May 1882 and assumed the name "Raritan Yacht Club," along with adopting the earlier founding date (1865) of the Carteret Boat Club for their official "founding" date as it also shares this date with the construction of the current RYC building. In December 1915, the Raritan Yacht Club was completely destroyed by fire and was rebuilt in 1916 at its current location.

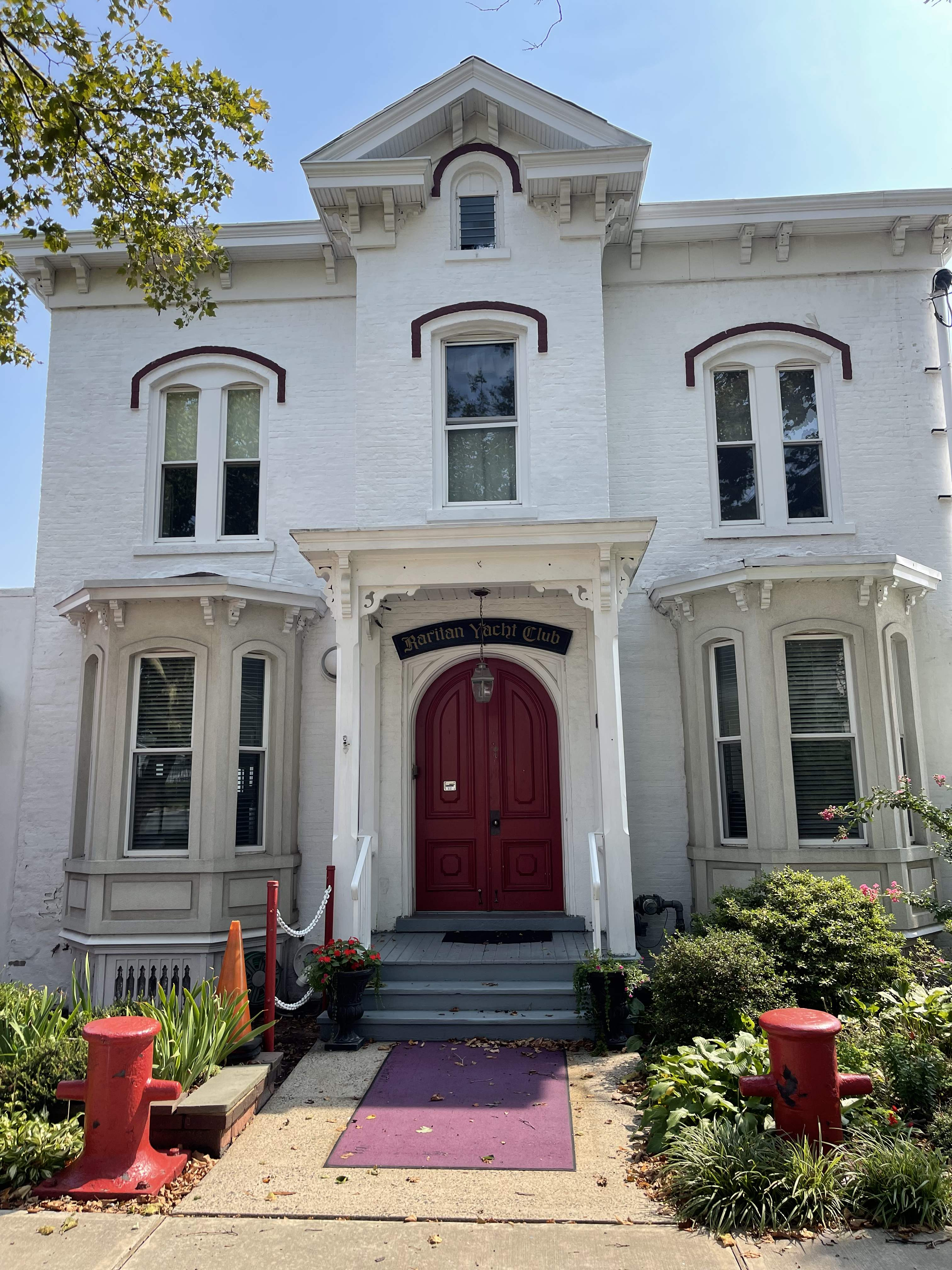
Raritan Yacht Club

Through its history, the club held regattas in the Raritan Bay, and members participated in larger races like the Newport to Bermuda race.

As of 2022, Raritan Yacht Club is a members-only facility with dock slips, moorings, a galley restaurant. The club hosts regattas for members and offers sailing lesson programs for children, teens, and adults during the sailing season, which is generally from mid-Spring to mid-Fall.

RYC adopted the St. George's Cross, which is a red cross on a white background dating back to the Middle Ages for its official burgee (flag).

=== Location ===
The original club building — and all its contents — was destroyed by a fire on December 22, 1915. In 1916, the club purchased the property of its current address (160 Water Street) which was originally the home of Perth Amboy resident Thomas E. Cooper. The Cooper home is waterfront brick Italianate styled mansion built in 1865. The current building has endured additions over the years. The lot measure 6,957 square feet sitting upon .98 of an acre respectively with a combined assessed value (as of 2020) of US$1,279,000.

== Hurricane damage ==
The club endured significant damage from hurricanes over the years, including Hurricane Sandy.

== Images ==
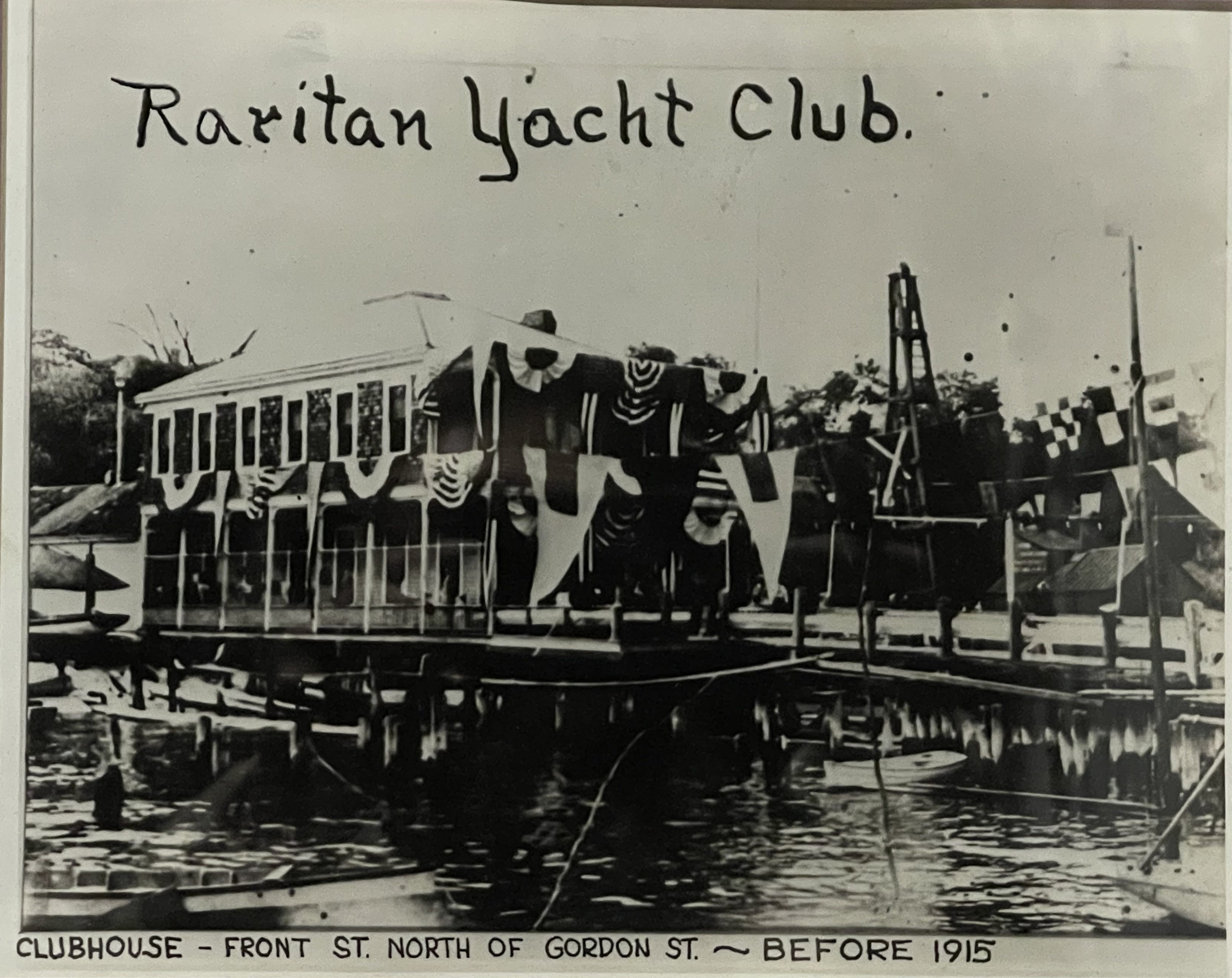
Raritan Yacht Club clubhouse before 1915

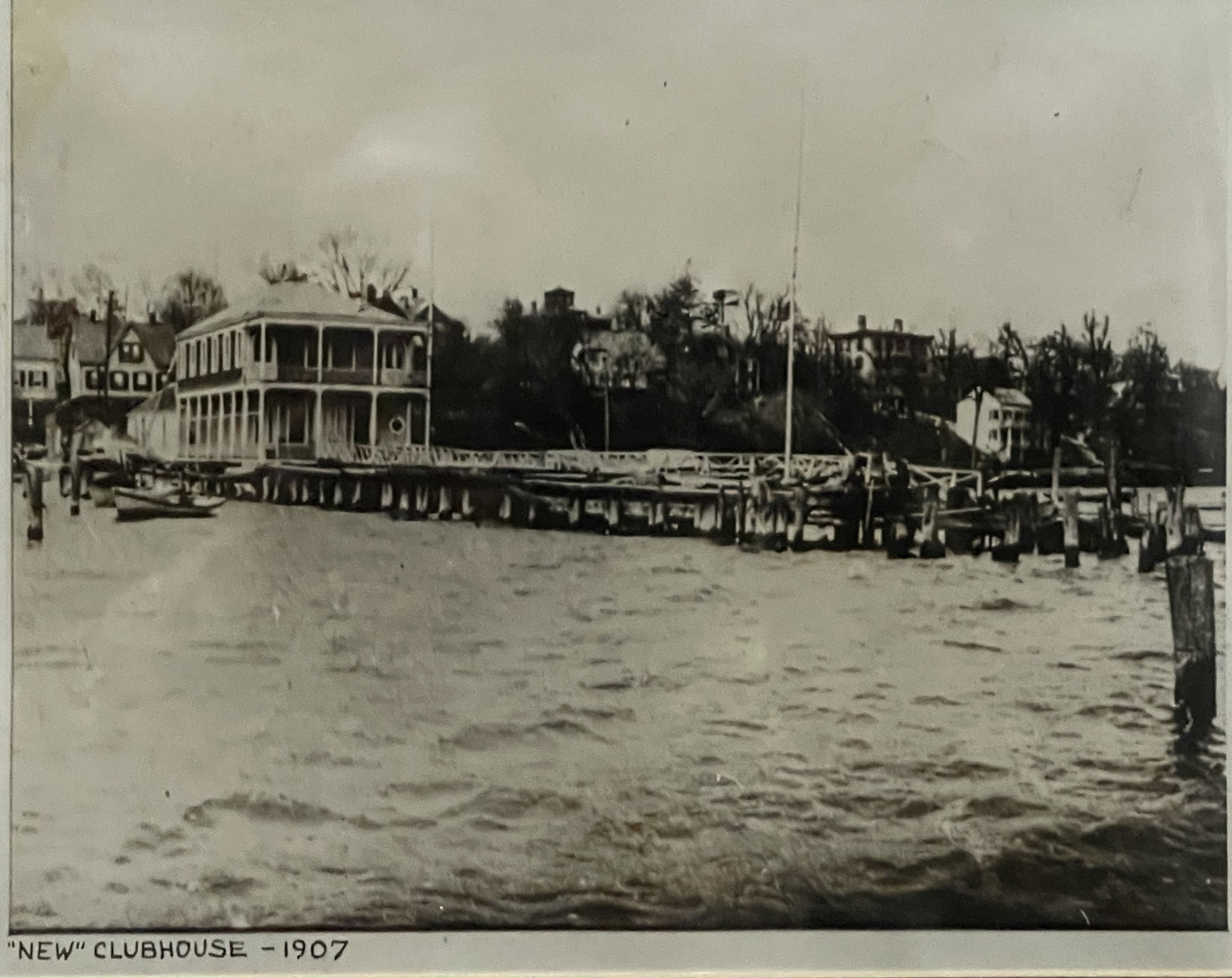
New clubhouse, Raritan Yacht club, 1907

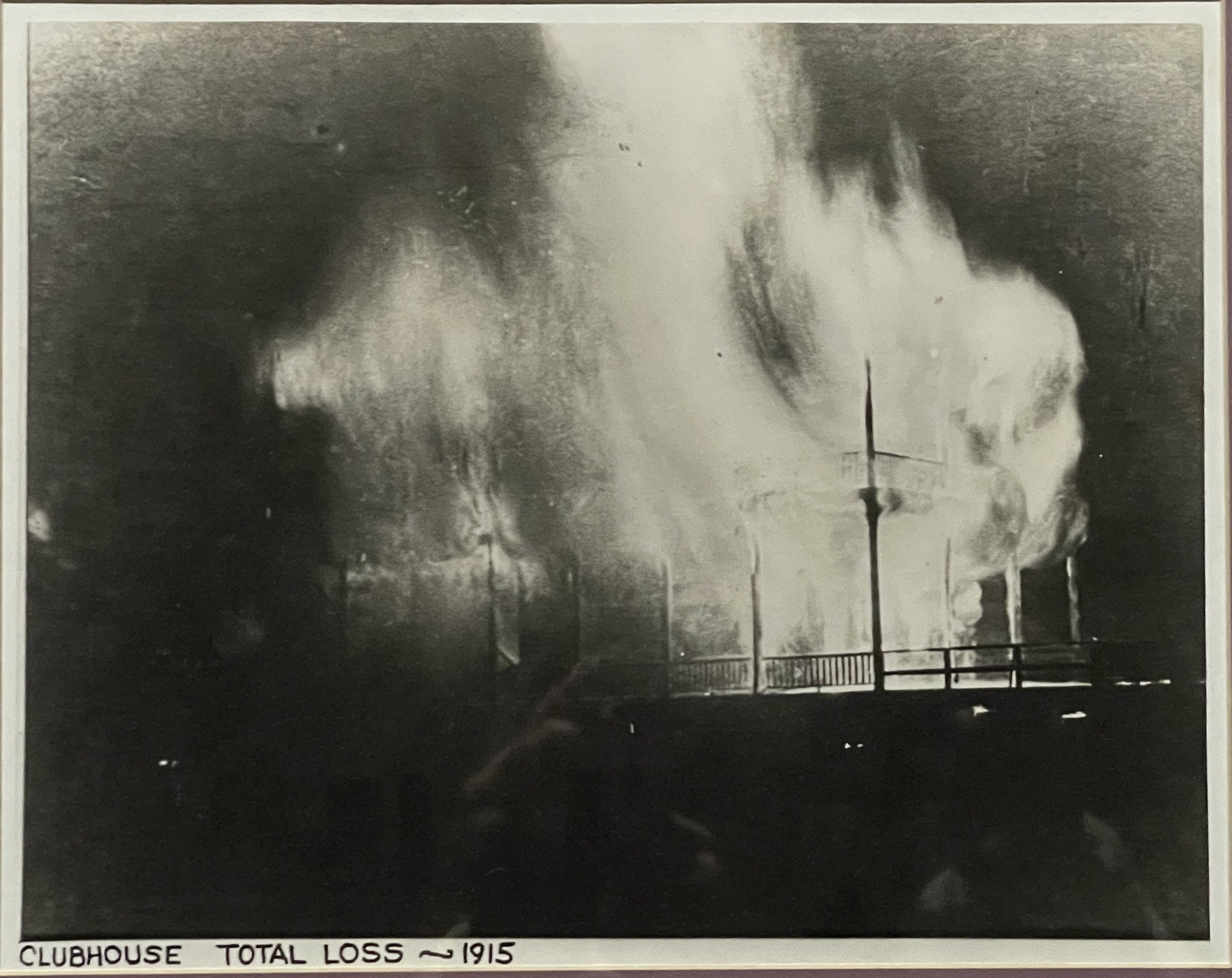
1915 fire burning the Raritan Yacht club

== Sources ==
- Raritan Yacht Club, Perth Amboy, NJ. Published by the club, 1865
- Constitution and By-laws of the Raritan Yacht Club of Perth Amboy, NJ. Published by the club, 1903
- MotorBoating, December 1929, Vol. 44, No. 6. ISSN 1531-2623.
