= Lapworth 24 =

Sailboat class

Development
- Designer: Bill Lapworth
- Location: United States
- Year: 1958
- Builder: Continental Plastics
- Role: Cruiser
- Name: Lapworth 24

Boat
- Displacement: 4,350 lb (1,973 kg)
- Draft: 4.00 ft (1.22 m)

Hull
- Type: monohull
- Construction: fiberglass
- LOA: 24.00 ft (7.32 m)
- LWL: 20.00 ft (6.10 m)
- Beam: 7.50 ft (2.29 m)
- Engine: outboard motor or inboard motor

Hull appendages
- Keel: modified long keel
- Ballast: 1,650 lb (748 kg)
- Rudder: keel-mounted rudder

Rig
- Rig type: Bermuda rig
- I foretriangle height: 24.50 ft (7.47 m)
- J foretriangle base: 9.00 ft (2.74 m)
- P mainsail luff: 30.50 ft (9.30 m)
- E mainsail foot: 12.00 ft (3.66 m)

Sails
- Sailplan: fractional rigged sloop
- Mainsail area: 183.00 sq ft (17.001 m^{2})
- Jib/genoa area: 110.25 sq ft (10.243 m^{2})
- Total sail area: 293.25 sq ft (27.244 m^{2})

Racing
- PHRF: 249

The Lapworth 24, sometimes called an L24, is an American recreational keelboat designed by Bill Lapworth and first built in 1958.

The Lapworth 24 design was developed into the flush-deck Gladiator 24 in 1958. The Spartan 24 was developed from the same design as an economy model.

== Production ==
The design was built by Continental Plastics in Costa Mesa, California, United States, starting in 1958, but is now out of production.

== Design ==
The Lapworth 24 is built predominantly of fiberglass, with wood trim. It has a fractional sloop rig, a spooned raked stem, an angled transom, a keel-mounted rudder controlled by a tiller and a fixed modified long keel, with a cut-away forefoot. It displaces 4,350 lb (1,973 kg) and carries 1,650 lb (748 kg) of lead ballast.

The boat has a draft of 4.00 ft (1.22 m) with the standard keel.

The boat is normally fitted with a 4 to 9 hp (3 to 7 kW) outboard motor or inboard motor for docking and maneuvering.

Designed as a cruiser, there is sleeping accommodation for four people, with a double "V"-berth in the bow cabin and a two straight settee quarter berths in the main cabin. The galley is located on the both sides just forward of the companionway ladder. The galley is equipped with a two-burner stove and a sink to starboard and an icebox to port. A navigation station is on the port side, on top of the ice box. The head is located centered in the bow cabin. Cabin headroom is 60 in (152 cm) and the fresh water tank has a capacity of 10 U.S. gallons (38 L; 8.3 imp gal).

The design has a PHRF racing average handicap of 249 and a hull speed of 6.0 kn (11.1 km/h).

== Operational history ==
Sixteen year old Robin Lee Graham sailed a used Lapworth 24, named Dove west from California in July 1965, reaching Saint Thomas, U.S. Virgin Islands in November 1968 before switching to a Luders 33 to complete the circumnavigation in 1970. His adventures became regular features in National Geographic Magazine and Graham later wrote a bestselling book about the voyage, entitled Dove.

In a 2010 review Steve Henkel wrote, "best features: The comparatively long deep keel on the L24 (and the Gladiator 24) versus her comp[etitor]s provides considerable directional stability (ie., ability to keep sailing in one direction without needing to correct the course using the helm or sail trim). Worst features: Like all her comps except one, the L24's draft is too deep for convenient trailer-sailing."

== See also ==
- List of sailing boat types

Related development

- Gladiator 24
