= Endeavor 26 =

Sailboat class

- E

Development
- Designer: Bill Lapworth
- Location: United States
- Year: 1963
- No. built: 56
- Builder: W. D. Schock Corp
- Role: Racer-day sailer
- Name: Endeavor 26

Boat
- Displacement: 3,200 lb (1,451 kg)
- Draft: 4.00 ft (1.22 m)

Hull
- Type: monohull
- Construction: fiberglass
- LOA: 25.75 ft (7.85 m)
- LWL: 18.00 ft (5.49 m)
- Beam: 7.00 ft (2.13 m)

Hull appendages
- Keel: fin keel
- Ballast: 1,600 lb (726 kg)
- Rudder: keel-mounted rudder

Rig
- Rig type: Bermuda rig
- I foretriangle height: 25.83 ft (7.87 m)
- J foretriangle base: 9.00 ft (2.74 m)
- P mainsail luff: 28.00 ft (8.53 m)
- E mainsail foot: 11.13 ft (3.39 m)

Sails
- Sailplan: fractional rigged sloop
- Mainsail area: 155.82 sq ft (14.476 m^{2})
- Jib/genoa area: 116.24 sq ft (10.799 m^{2})
- Spinnaker area: 340 sq ft (32 m^{2})
- Total sail area: 272.06 sq ft (25.275 m^{2})

The Endeavor 26 is an American trailerable sailboat that was designed by Bill Lapworth as a racer and day sailer and first built in 1963.

== Production ==
The design was built by W. D. Schock Corp in the United States, from 1963 until 1967 with a total of 56 boats completed. It is now out of production.

== Design ==
The Endeavor 26 is a racing keelboat, built predominantly of fiberglass, with wood trim. It has a fractional sloop rig; a spooned, raked stem, a raised counter, angled transom, a keel-mounted rudder controlled by a tiller and a fixed fin keel. It displaces 3,200 lb (1,451 kg) and carries 1,600 lb (726 kg) of lead ballast.

The boat has a draft of 4.00 ft (1.22 m) with the standard keel.

The design has sleeping accommodation for four people, with a double "V"-berth in the bow cabin and two straight settees in the main cabin. The head is located centered in the bow cabin under the "V"-berth.

For sailing downwind the design may be equipped with a symmetrical spinnaker of 340 sq ft (32 m^{2}).

The design has a hull speed of 5.69 kn (10.54 km/h).

== See also ==
- List of sailing boat types
