= Bill Lapworth =

American naval architect (1919–2006)

- Born: Charles William Lapworth; 12 December 1919; Detroit, Michigan
- Died: 3 April 2006 (aged 86)
- Education: University of Michigan
- Occupation: Naval architect
- Known for: Sailboat designs

Charles William Lapworth (12 December 1919 – 3 April 2006) was an American naval architect who designed a large number of sailboats, many of them for Cal Yachts. He was active as a designer from the early 1950s until the 1980s. Described as "one of the foremost West Coast naval architects in the post-World War II period", he has been nominated to the US National Sailing Hall of Fame.

== Early life ==
Born on 12 December 1919 in Detroit, Michigan. He went to the University of Michigan, completing a degree in marine engineering and naval architecture. He went on to serve in the US Navy in World War II as an officer in the bureau of ships at Quincy, Massachusetts. He later served at naval repair base at San Diego.

== Professional life ==
After the war Lapworth moved to California and became partners in a yacht design business with Merle Davis in Los Angeles. In less than a year Davis had died, leaving Lapworth to run the business alone. He earned some income by doing marine surveyor work.

He soon progressed to sailboat design work, drawing new rigs to update some west coast racing sailboats. He designed new rigs for the 82 ft (25 m) sloop Patolita, later renamed Sirius II. He also designed the conversion of the 98 ft (30 m) schooner Morningstar to a ketch rig and the 77 ft (23 m) schooner Queen Mab, which was converted to a staysail schooner.

Lapworth also competed as a racing sailor, sailing International 14s. He completed in the class championships in Rochester, New York in 1948 and in Montreal, Quebec in Canada in 1949.

He created a series of custom boat designs for light displacement racers that quickly developed a reputation for winning races, or at least placing highly in them. His early boats included Flying Scotsman and Nalu II, a 46 ft (14 m) boat that won the Transpacific Yacht Race Class C four times and overall once, in 1958. He designed the second-place overall Transpacific winner in 1961, named Ichiban, a 50 ft (15 m) sloop. By 1958, 70 of his wooden Lapworth 36 design had been produced, but the age of wooden sailboats was at its end.

The new material to construct boats from was now fiberglass and Lapworth started drawing boats taking advantage of its strength and lightness. His skills attracted the attention of Jack Jensen of Jensen Marine, who walked into Lapworth's office and asked him to design a new line of fiberglass sailboats. The deal was closed with just a handshake and became one of the longest and most successful commercial sailboat building relationships, lasting until after Jensen died in 1980.

Lapworth's first design was a 24.39 ft (7.43 m) sloop. Jensen had intended to call it the Lapworth 24, but Lapworth had previously designed a boat with that designation for another customer and so they decided to call it the Cal 24 (for California) and the line became the Cal Yachts brand of Jensen Marine. The most successful was the Cal 20, of which more than 1,900 were built.

His 1963 Cal 40 design was noted for its speed and race-winning history.

== Personal life ==
Lapworth married his wife, Peggy, in 1966 and at the time of his death they had been married for 40 years. They had five children, Barbara Burman Rolph, Charles William Lapworth III, Robert Lapworth Jr., Susan Cohl and Kim Sorenson. They also had five grandchildren.

Lapworth's favourite of his own designs was the Cal Cruising 46 and he owned and sailed one for many years.

His obituary noted his sailing skills, stating, "as a shipmate Bill was absolutely tops to sail with; a consummate helmsman and extremely valuable tactician; always sought as a crew on major races. He also sailed on boats not of his own design, providing these most useful characteristics to their owners. His designs gave him a primacy never before achieved by a naval architect as yet on the west coast. His calm demeanor was a most recognized characteristic and his evenhanded nature fostered only the best in his fellow sailors."

== Death ==
Lapworth died on 3 April 2006 at age 86 and was buried at sea on 7 April 2006 from the Newport Harbor Yacht Club, in Balboa, California.

== Boat designs ==
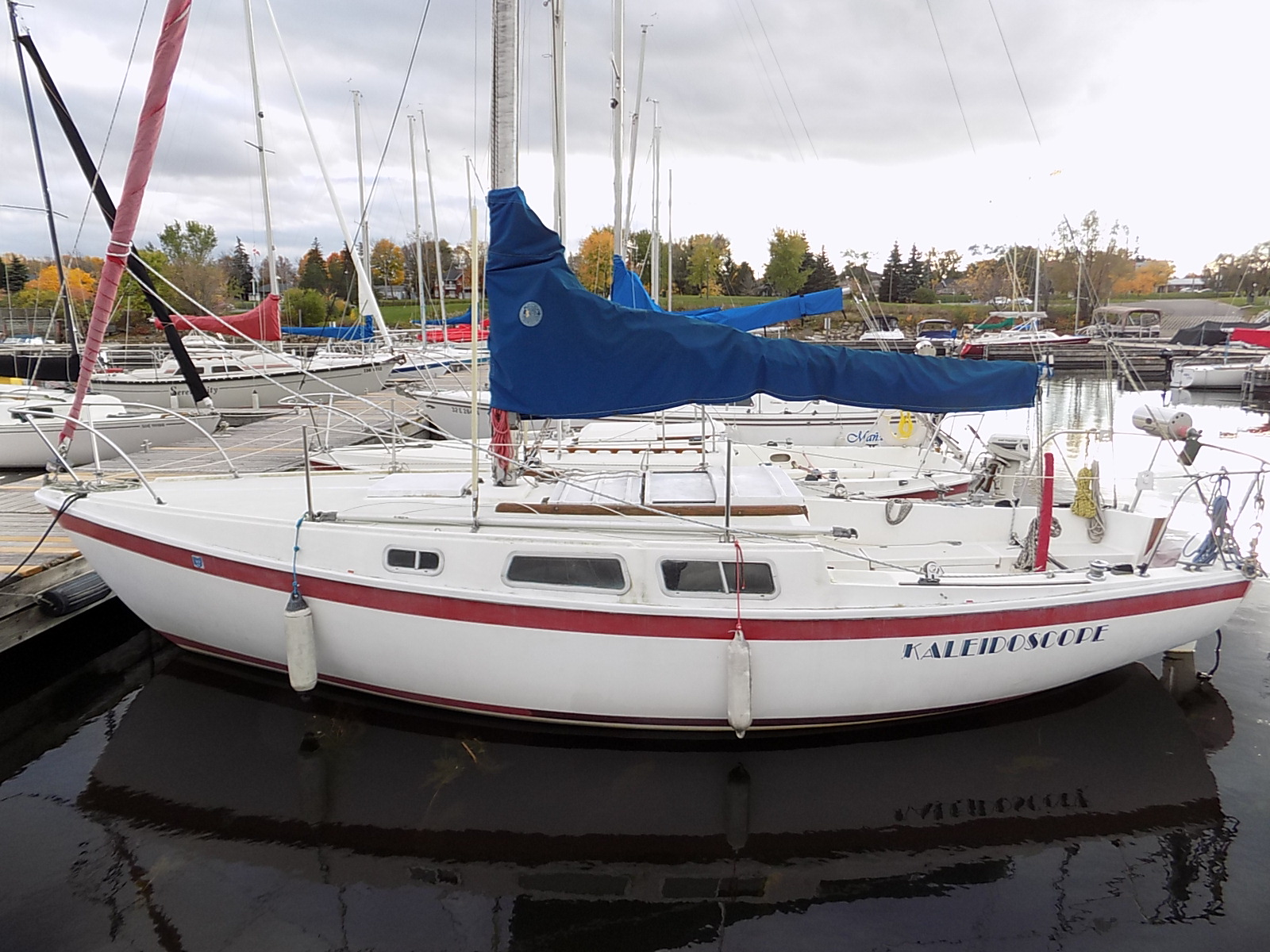
Cal 25

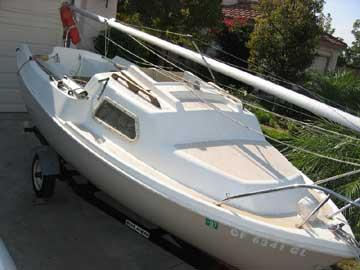
Newport 16

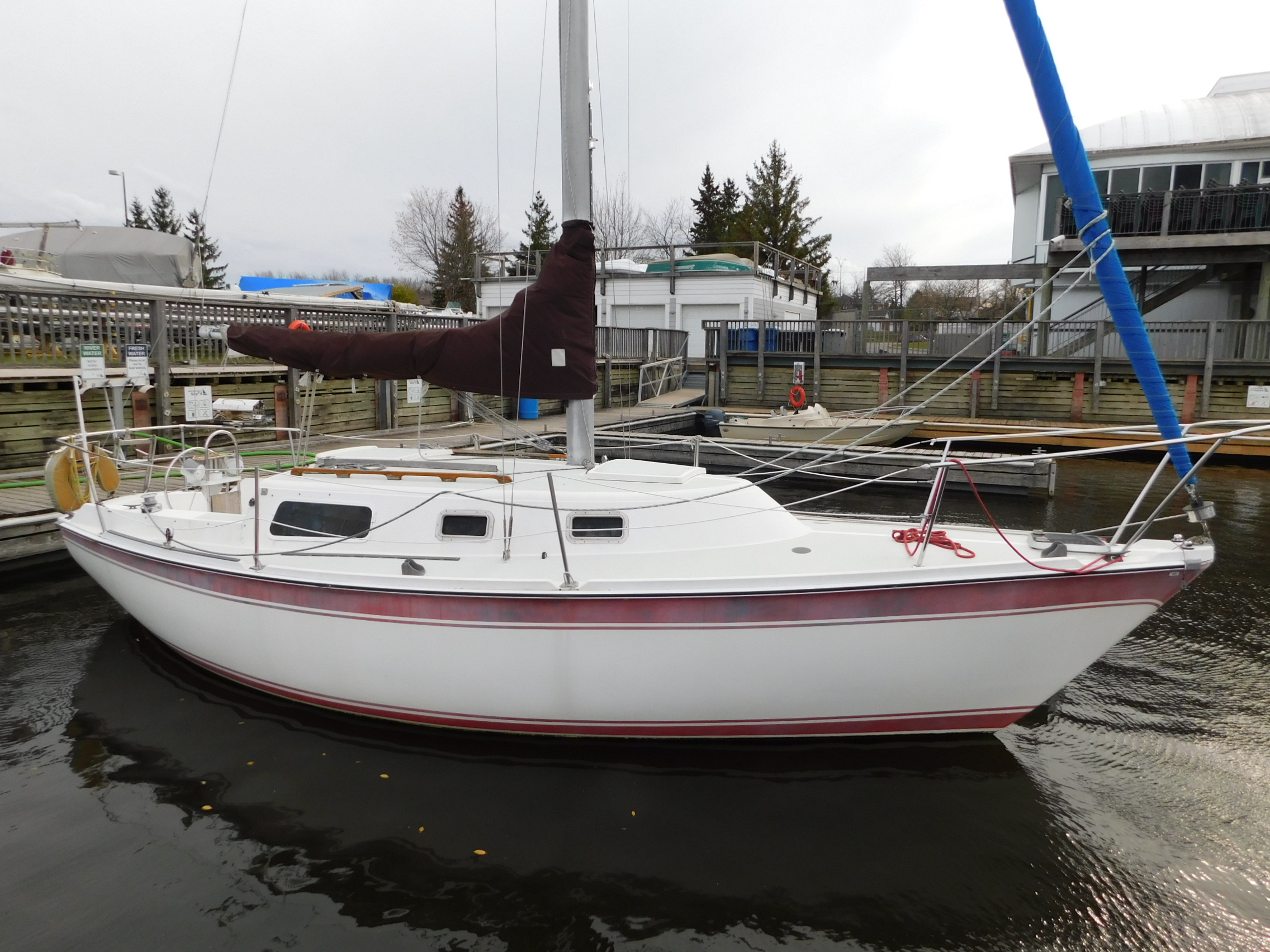
Cal 2-27

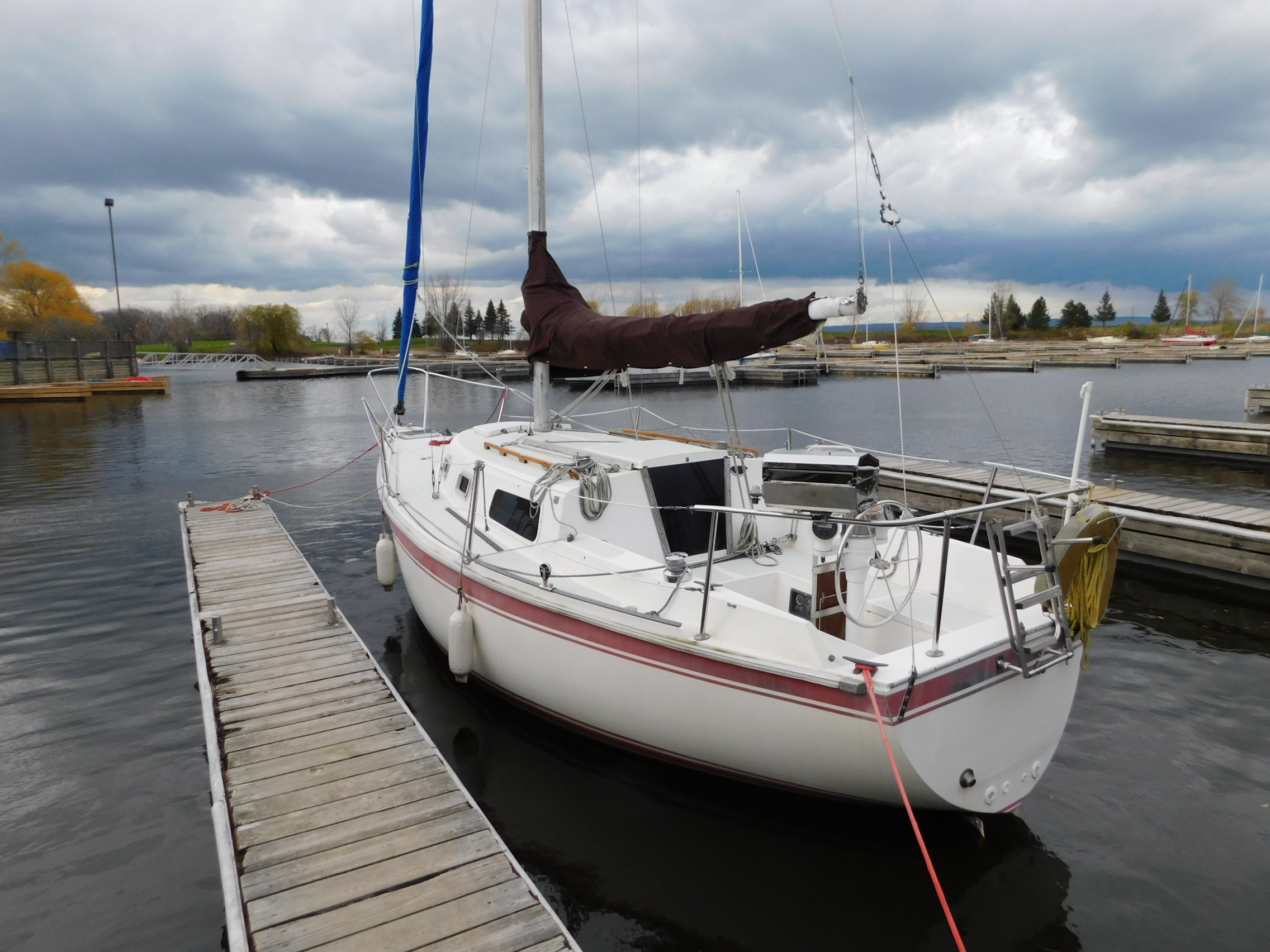
Cal 2-27

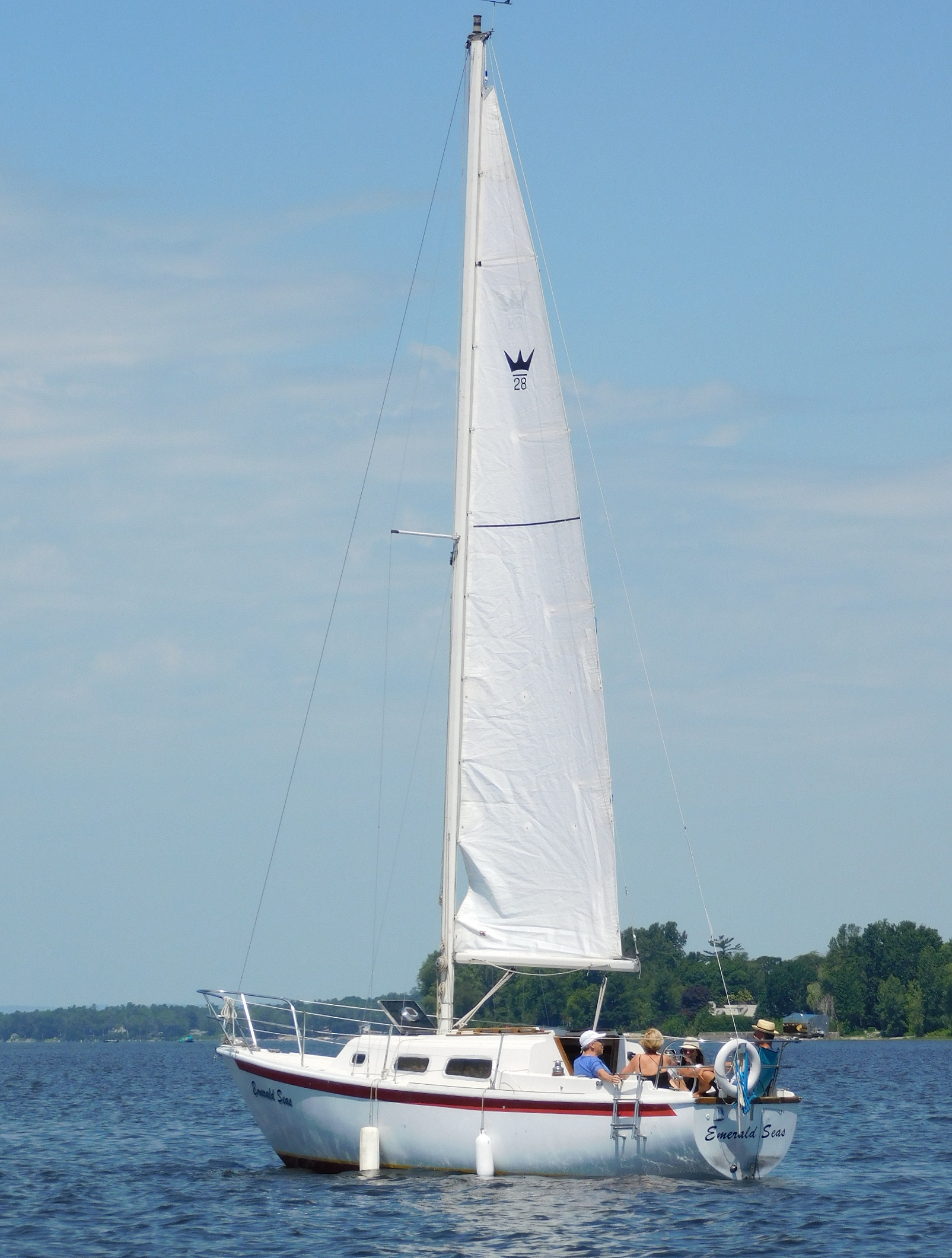
Crown 28

Lapworth designed a large number of sailboats, many of them for Cal Yachts:

- Lapworth 32 - 1951
- Lapworth 26 - 1953
- Cal 24 - 1958
- Gladiator 24 - 1958
- Lapworth 24 - 1958
- Lapworth 39 - 1959
- Lapworth 40 - 1960
- Metcalf - 1960
- Cal 20 - 1961
- Cal 30 - 1961
- Islander 44 - 1962
- Lapworth 50 - 1962
- Cal 28 - 1963
- Cal 40 - 1963
- Endeavor 26 - 1963
- Cal 25 - 1965
- Newport 16 - 1965
- Cal 48 - 1966
- Cal 2-24 - 1967
- Cal Cruising 46 - 1967
- Cal Cruising 36 - 1968
- Cal 29 - 1968
- Cal 34 - 1968
- Cal 2-30 - 1968
- Cal 21 - 1969
- Crown 23 - 1969
- Cal 39 - 1970
- Calgan 23 - 1970
- Lapworth 48 - 1970
- Cal 27 - 1971
- Cal 33 - 1971
- Cal 43 - 1971
- Cal T/4 - 1971
- Cal 2-46 - 1971
- Cal T/2 - 1972
- Cal 35 Cruise - 1973
- Cal 3-30 - 1973
- Cal 2-27 - 1974
- Cal 2-29 - 1974
- Cal 3-46 - 1975
- Cal 2-34 - 1975
- Crown 28 - 1976
- Cal 2-25 - 1977
- Cal 34-III - 1977
- Cal 39 Mark II - 1978
- Cal 31 - 1979
- Cal 35 - 1979
- Martinique 25 - 1979
- Neptune 16 - 1981
- Cal 39 Mark III - 1983
- Cal 3-27 - 1983
- Phoenix 12 - 1983
- Gloucester 16 - 1986

== See also ==
- List of sailboat designers and manufacturers
