= Cal 2-24 =

Sailboat class

Development
- Designer: C. William Lapworth
- Location: United States
- Year: 1967
- No. built: 185
- Builder: Jensen Marine/Cal Yachts
- Role: Racer
- Name: Cal 2-24

Boat
- Displacement: 3,700 lb (1,678 kg)
- Draft: 4.00 ft (1.22 m)

Hull
- Type: monohull
- Construction: fiberglass
- LOA: 24.00 ft (7.32 m)
- LWL: 19.17 ft (5.84 m)
- Beam: 7.75 ft (2.36 m)
- Engine: outboard motor

Hull appendages
- Keel: swept fin keel
- Ballast: 1,400 lb (635 kg)
- Rudder: spade-type rudder

Rig
- Rig type: Bermuda rig
- I foretriangle height: 27.50 ft (8.38 m)
- J foretriangle base: 9.75 ft (2.97 m)
- P mainsail luff: 26.00 ft (7.92 m)
- E mainsail foot: 10.50 ft (3.20 m)

Sails
- Sailplan: fractional rigged sloop
- Mainsail area: 136.50 sq ft (12.681 m^{2})
- Jib/genoa area: 134.06 sq ft (12.455 m^{2})
- Total sail area: 270.56 sq ft (25.136 m^{2})

Racing
- PHRF: 228

The Cal 2-24, also called the Cal 24-2 and the Cal 24 Mark II is an American trailerable sailboat that was designed by C. William Lapworth as a racer and first built in 1967.

The boat was an entirely new design to replace the original Lapworth-designed Cal 24 in the Cal Yachts product line.

The design was officially marketed by the manufacturer as the Cal 24, but was later marketed as the Cal 2–24 to differentiate it from the unrelated 1958 Lapworth Cal 24 design and the 1983 C. Raymond Hunt Associates-designed Cal 3-24. At the time of their market introduction each of these designs was sold under the designation of Cal 24.

== Production ==
The design was built by Cal Yachts in the United States, from 1967 to 1971 with 185 boats completed, but it is now out of production.

== Design ==
The boat incorporated what Lapworth called his "finer-bow", which he thought gave it an advantage in windward sailing in waves.

The Cal 24 is a racing keelboat, built predominantly of fiberglass, with wood trim. It has a fractional sloop rig; a spooned, raked stem; a raised counter, slightly angled transom; a spade-type rudder controlled by a tiller and a fixed, swept, fin keel. It displaces 3,700 lb (1,678 kg) and carries 1,400 lb (635 kg) of lead ballast.

The boat has a draft of 4.00 ft (1.22 m) with the standard keel.

The boat is normally fitted with a small 4 to 8 hp (3 to 6 kW) outboard motor for docking and maneuvering.

The design has sleeping accommodation for four people, with a double "V"-berth in the bow cabin and two straight settee quarter berths in the main cabin. The head is located just aft of bow "V"-berth on the port side. Cabin headroom is 48 in (120 cm).

The design has a PHRF racing average handicap of 228 and a hull speed of 5.9 kn (10.9 km/h).

== Operational history ==
In a 2010 review Steve Henkel wrote, "The raised deck on the Cal 24-2 (sometimes called the Cal 2-24 by her marketers, and by others sometimes called the Cal 24 Mk II) provides an uncluttered foredeck, and though raised decks tend to increase headroom below, in this case they don't, as the headroom at 4' 0" is worst among the Cal's comp[etitor]s. Unlike her comp[etitor]s, the focus of the Cal 24-2's design was mainly on racing, and it shows in her PHRF rating, her lack of galley amenities, and her underbody form. Her fin keel and spade rudder give her a greater ability to maneuver at the starting line and turn quickly at marks, but prevent her from attaining the easy-steering straight-line stability of her more cruising-oriented long- keel comps. Best features: The Cal 24-2 has a presentable PHRF rating of 228, best of her comp[etitor]s and in line with her Cal 24-1 and Cal 24-3 sisters, as well as other boats as varied as the Neptune 24 ..."

== See also ==
- List of sailing boat types
