= Newport Bermuda Race =

Annual yacht race

- Date: Starts Biennally on the Third Friday in June
- Location: Newport, Rhode Island
- Event type: Ocean racing
- Distance: 635 nautical miles
- Primary sponsor: Bermuda
- Established: 1906, 120 years ago
- Course records: 33 hours (2022) and
- Website: bermudarace.com

The Newport Bermuda Race, commonly known as the Bermuda Race, is a biennial, 635 nautical miles (1175 km) sailing yacht race from Newport, Rhode Island, to the British island of Bermuda. The Race is the oldest regularly scheduled ocean race in the world, and one of two regularly scheduled races "held almost entirely out of sight of land." The race is particularly popular among current and retired members of the United States Coast Guard, who regularly make up significant portions of the participants.

The Indian Harbor Yacht Club has recorded more entries in the Newport Bermuda Race than any other yacht club in the world.

In a typical race, the fleet enters the Atlantic and the Gulf Stream, with rough water, giving the race its nickname, "The Thrash to the Onion Patch." Once through the rough Gulf Stream, the sailors press on to the finish off St. David's Lighthouse, then winding channel to Hamilton, Bermuda, to the Royal Bermuda Yacht Club.

Along with Sydney to Hobart Yacht Race and the Fastnet Race, it is considered one of the classic big offshore races with each distance approximately 625 nautical miles (719 mi; 1,158 km).

To quote Gary Jobson, "It’s a feather in every sailor’s cap to have done the race, and many consider the Lighthouse Trophy the most coveted trophy in distance racing."

== Early history ==
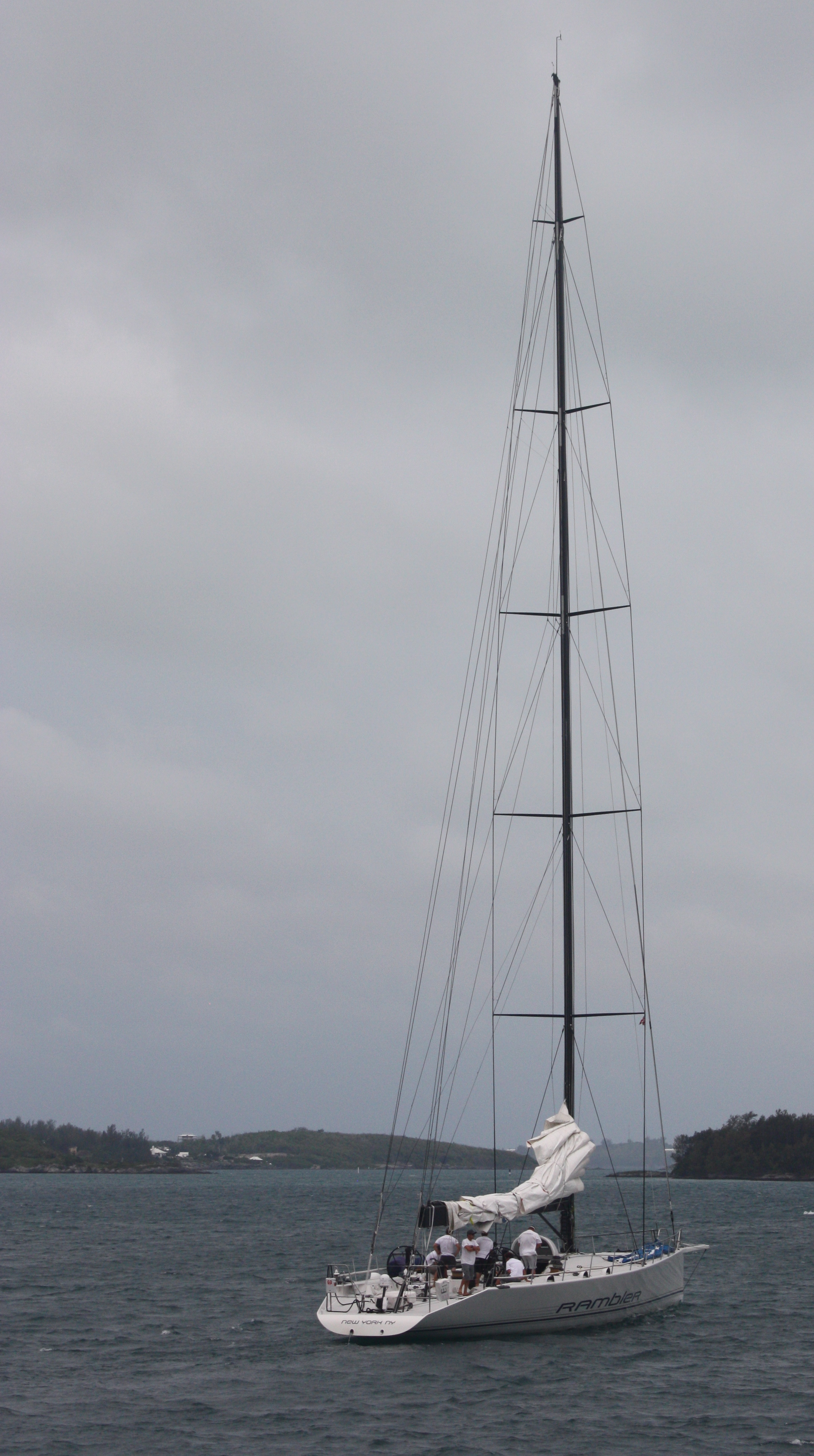
The 90-foot maxi yacht Rambler, first to finish in the 2012 Newport Bermuda Race

The very first Bermuda Race was an act of rebellion. In 1906, the Establishment believed that it would be impossible for amateur sailors to race offshore in boats under 80 feet. Thomas Fleming Day, editor of The Rudder magazine, disagreed, insisting, "The danger of the sea for generations has been preached by the ignorant." Certain that an ocean race would be enjoyable and safe – and also develop better sailors and better boats – Day founded one on his own. The Brooklyn Yacht Club started the race in New York Bay, in Bermuda, the RBYC finished it off at St. David’s Head.

The smallest entry then (and in Bermuda Race history) was the 28-foot sloop Gauntlet. She was notorious for her size, and also for her crew because it included a woman, 20-year-old Thora Lund Robinson. Having outpaced Gauntlet and another boat which dropped out, and the winner was the 38-foot yawl Tamerlane, with Thomas Fleming Day himself as sailing master. The yacht club provided a special anchorage off White’s Island for the race boats, set aside rooms for the skippers and navigators in the clubhouse, and laid on many parties culminating with a traditional turtle dinner at the prize banquet.

There were four more races before the sailors decided it was too much to ask that the race be held annually.

After World War I, RBYC Vice-Commodore Eldon Trimingham went up to New York to stir up a revival of the race, to much agreement. After 22 boats started in 1923 at New London, Connecticut, and every boat finished. Three years later, the RBYC and the Cruising Club of America teamed up to host the race.

Since 1923 to this day, the task of inspecting boats, arranging for trophies, the starting and finishing lines, and maintaining the race’s emphasis on safe seamanship falls on volunteer members of both clubs. In 45 races over a century, only two boats have been lost, one on Bermuda’s reef, and the other in a deadly fire in 1932 that also claimed the Bermuda Race’s first loss of life.

== Recent history ==
165 boats started the 48th Newport Bermuda Race in 2012. A new elapsed time record of 39 hours, 39 minutes, 18 seconds was set in 2012 by George David's 90-foot Rambler, which averaged over 16 knots under perfect sailing conditions. The corrected time winner for the second straight race was Rives Potts' 48-foot Carina, which also won the race in 1970.

Again 165 boats the 49th Newport Bermuda Race in 2014. Shockwave took line honors and first overall corrected time winner in one of the slowest races in recent history in far from perfect sailing conditions.

All race results are posted at the Bermuda Race website.

=== 2016 Race ===
At 4:22:53EDT on 19 June 2016, James H. Clark's 100-Foot Comanche, with skipper Ken Read and navigator Stan Honey, crossed the finish line in Bermuda with an elapsed time of 34h 52m 53s, breaking George David's Rambler record by more than 4h 36s.

The 2016 Bermuda Race was the 50th running of the race. More than 195 boats were sanctioned by the Bermuda Race Organizing Committee as qualified entries in the 50th Newport Bermuda Race. An International fleet competed in the biennial race that began on 17 June. There was also the Onion Patch Series, a parallel inter-club and international team-race event.

The 2016 Newport Bermuda Race had seven divisions, each with its divisional and class prizes. The race has no single winner. Except Super Yachts, each division is rated under the Offshore Racing Rule (ORR).

=== 2022 ===
In the first race since 2018 Jason Carroll of Larchmont Yacht Club and the crew of the MOD70 trimaran Argo won line honors and established a new overall race record when they completed the 52nd edition Saturday night local time. Argo’s elapsed time of 33 hours, 0 minutes, 9 seconds. This was fast enough to achieve the first-ever Saturday night finish in the history of the Bermuda Race.

Cal 40 Illusion skippered by Sally and Stan Honey took the St Davids Lighthouse trophy by winning on corrected time. In an [www.youtube.com/watch?v=02xVffWqgnw interview] Rives Potts discusses his prior St Davids Lighthouse victories and long friendship with Stan Honey.

Unfortunately, 2022 saw the race’s second loss of life when the captain of the Morgan of Marietta, a 42-foot sloop, fell overboard during strong conditions.

== Current Classes ==
- St. David’s Lighthouse Division: cruiser-racers with amateur helmsmen.
- Gibbs Hill Lighthouse Division: racers with professional helmsmen permitted.
- Finisterre Division cruisers/passagemakers with amateur helmsmen.
- Double-Handed Division: one crew may be a professional.
- Open Division: cant-keel racers with professional helmsmen permitted.
- Super Yacht Division: 90-plus feet long, International Super Yacht Rule.
- Spirit of Tradition Division: replicas and other traditional boats.

== Winners ==
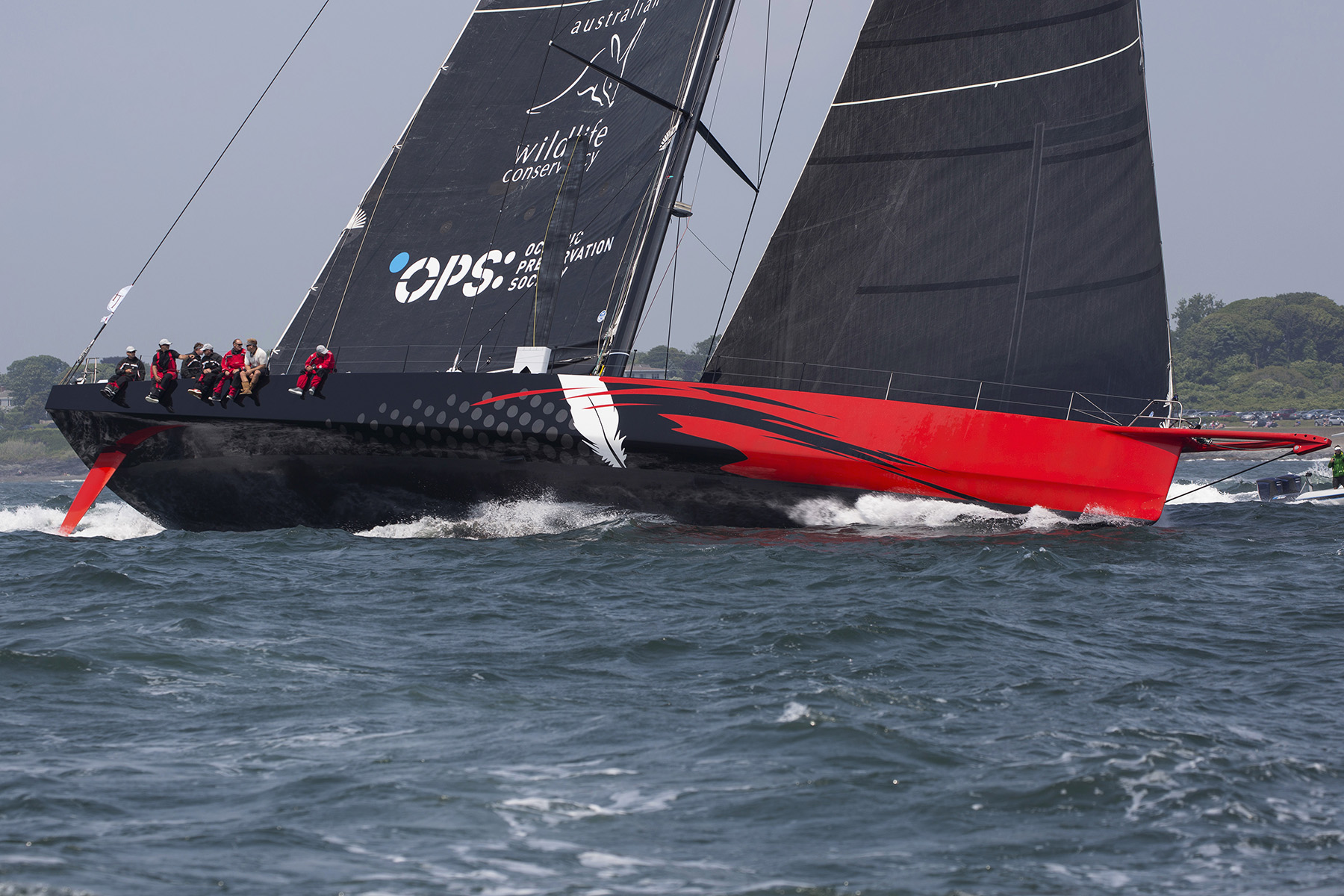
Comanche in the Rolex Transatlantic Race 2015 leaving Newport RI

=== St. David's Lighthouse Trophy ===
Year	Yacht	Make	Owner	Club Affiliation
2004	(United States) Alliance	Swan 45	Dominick Porco	New York Yacht Club
2006	(United States) Sinn Fein	Cal 40	Peter S. Rebovich Sr.	Raritan Yacht Club
2008	(United States) Sinn Fein	Cal 40	Peter S. Rebovich Sr.	Raritan Yacht Club
2010	(United States) Carina	M&R 40	Rives Potts	Cruising Club of America
2012	(United States) Carina	M&R 40	Rives Potts	Cruising Club of America
2014	(United States) Actaea	Hinckley Bermuda 40	Michael Cone	Cruising Club of America
2016	(United States) Warrior Won	Xp 44	Christopher Sheehan	Larchmont Yacht Club
2018	(United States) Grundoon	Columbia 50	James Grundy	New York Yacht Club
2022	(United States) Illusion	Cal 40	Sally and Stan Honey	Palo Alto Ca
2024	(United States) Carina	M&R 40	Rives Potts	Cruising Club of America

=== Line Honors ===
Year	Yacht	Owner	Designer	Elapsed Time
2002	(United States) Pyewacket	Roy E. Disney	Reichel/Pugh 75	67h 54m 22s
2004	(Germany) Morninger Glory	Hasso Plattner	Maxi Z86	62h 48m 31s
2006	(United States) Bella Mente	Hap Fouth	Judel/Vrolijk 66	111h 12m 18s
2008	(United States) Speedboat	Alex Jackson	Juan Kouyoumdjian 100	64h 42m 56s
2010	(United States) Speedboat	Alex Jackson	Juan Kouyoumdjian 100	59h 17m 56s
2012	(France) Med Spirit	Michael DAmelio	Welbourn 92	45h 26m 28s
2014	(United States) Shockwave	George Sakellaris	Reichel/Pugh	63h 04m 11s
2016	(United States) Comanche	James H. Clark and Kristy Hinze	VPLP design	34h 42m 53s
2018	(United States) Rambler 88	George David	Juan Kouyoumdjian	50h 31m 51s
2022	(United States) Argo	Jason Carroll	MOD70 Trimaran	33h 0m 9s
2024	(United States) Pyewacket 70	Roy Disney	Volvo 70 Mod	59h 17m 35s

== Environmental commitment ==
In 2012, it was announced that the Race had committed to seeking certification as a "clean regatta", encouraging participants "to adopt a number of best practices for the health of the oceans, including reducing plastic bottle use, following a leave-no-trace approach to dealing with trash, promoting the use of non-toxic cleaning products and bottom paint, and preventing oil spills."
