= Cal 25 =

Sailboat class

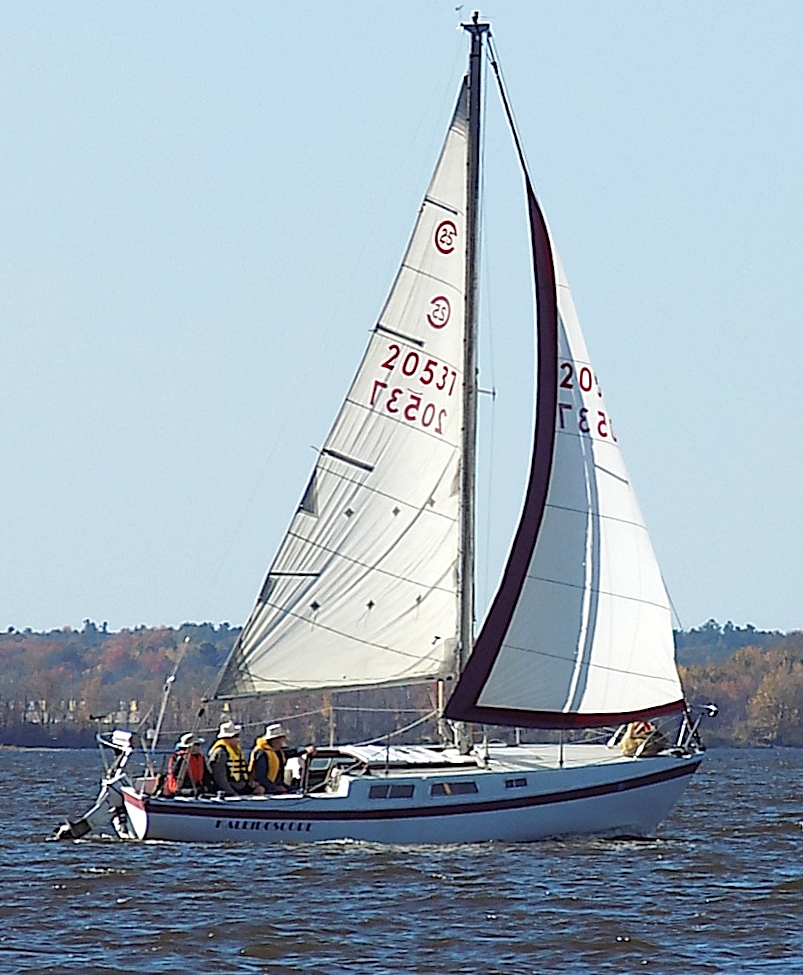

Development
- Designer: C. William Lapworth
- Location: United States
- Year: 1965
- No. built: 1,848
- Builder: Jensen Marine
- Name: Cal 25

Boat
- Displacement: 4,000 lb (1,814 kg)
- Draft: 4.00 ft (1.22 m)

Hull
- Type: Monohull
- Construction: Fiberglass
- LOA: 25.00 ft (7.62 m)
- LWL: 20.00 ft (6.10 m)
- Beam: 8.00 ft (2.44 m)
- Engine: Outboard motor

Hull appendages
- Keel: fin keel
- Ballast: 1,700 lb (771 kg)
- Rudder: internally-mounted spade-type rudder

Rig
- General: Masthead sloop
- I foretriangle height: 29.80 ft (9.08 m)
- J foretriangle base: 10.00 ft (3.05 m)
- P mainsail luff: 25.00 ft (7.62 m)
- E mainsail foot: 11.00 ft (3.35 m)

Sails
- Mainsail area: 137.50 sq ft (12.774 m^{2})
- Jib/genoa area: 149.00 sq ft (13.843 m^{2})
- Total sail area: 286.50 sq ft (26.617 m^{2})

Racing
- PHRF: 219 (average)

The Cal 25 is an American trailerable sailboat, that was designed by C. William Lapworth and first built in 1965.

== Production ==
The boat was built by Jensen Marine/Cal Yachts in the United States between 1965 and 1976, and also by Calgan Marine under license in North Vancouver, British Columbia, Canada, but it is now out of production. The company built 1,848 examples of the design during its 11-year production run.

== Design ==
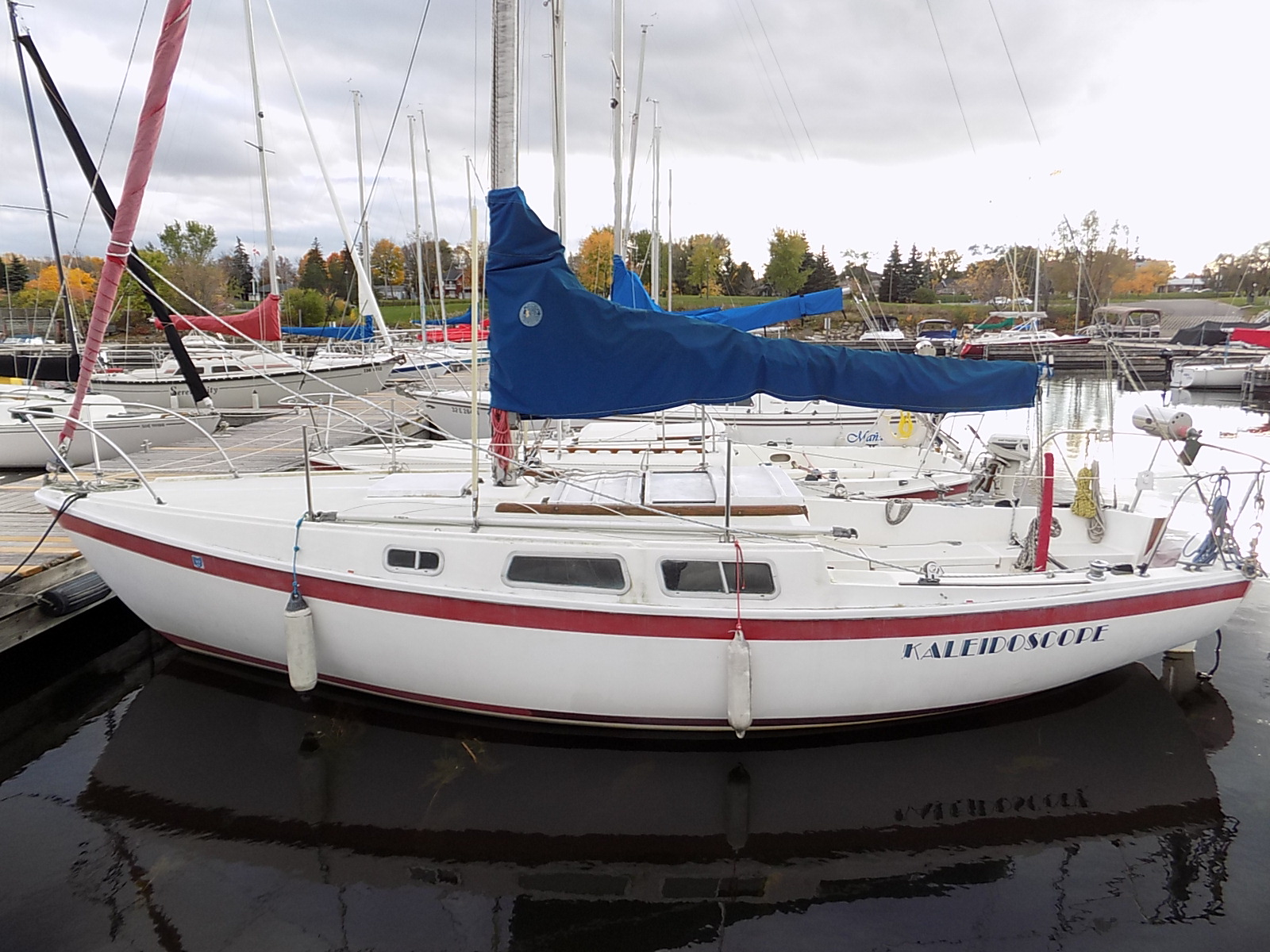
Cal 25

The Cal 25 is a small recreational keelboat, built predominantly of fiberglass, with wood trim. It has a masthead sloop rig, an internally-mounted spade-type rudder and a fixed fin keel. It displaces 4,000 lb (1,814 kg) and carries 1,700 lb (771 kg) of lead ballast. The boat has a draft of 4.00 ft (1.22 m) with the standard keel fitted.

The boat is normally fitted with a small outboard motor for docking and maneuvering.

The boat has a PHRF racing average handicap of 219 with a high of 213 and low of 228. It has a hull speed of 5.99 kn (11.09 km/h).

== Operational history ==
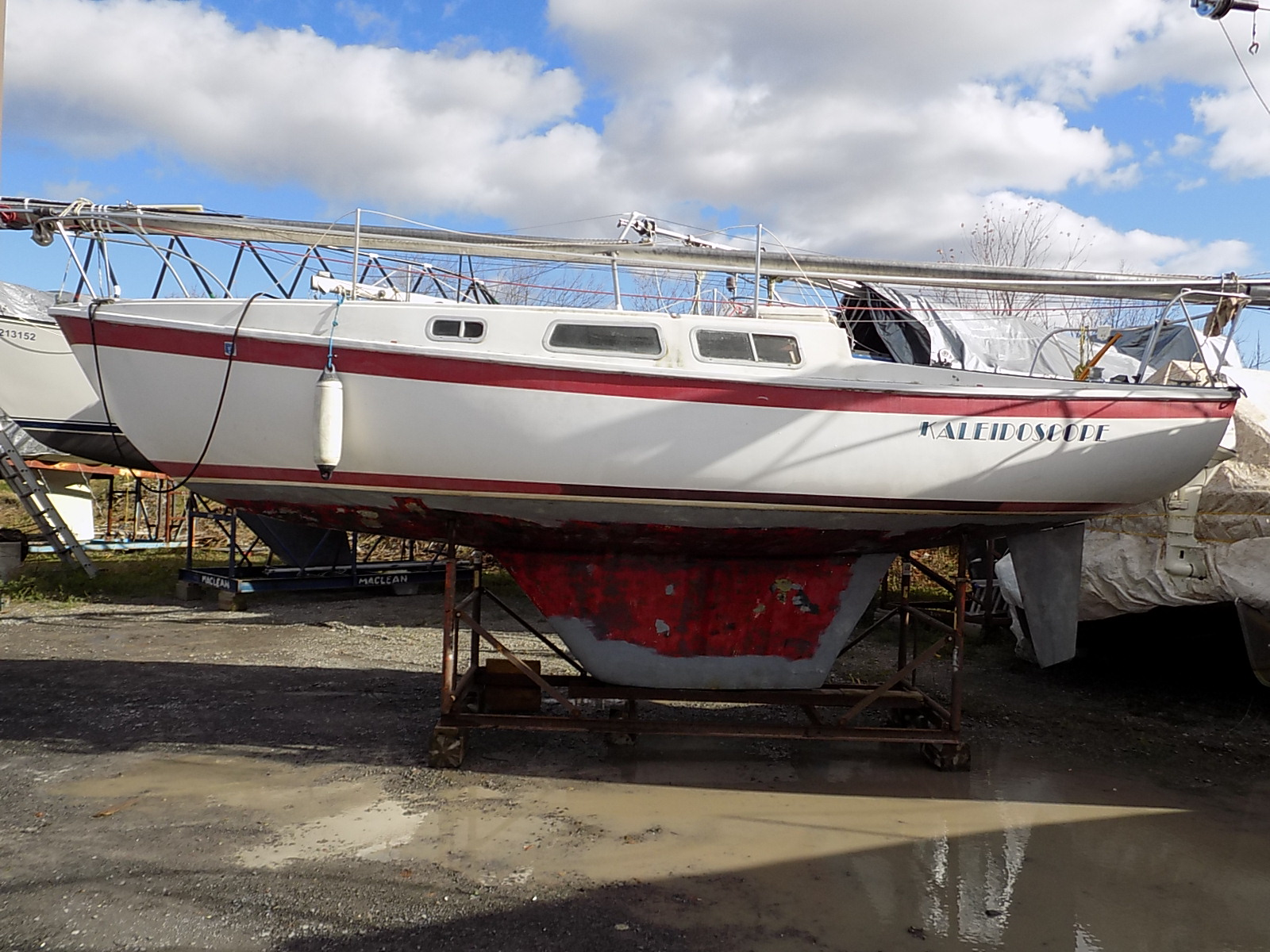
Cal 25 on its cradle, showing the keel and rudder arrangement

In a 2010 review Steve Henkel wrote, "the Cal 25 ... is stable in a blow, has a cockpit big enough to sail four and drink six, and will sleep a friendly group of four or even five souls. (One couple and their two young children completely rebuilt an old Cal 25 and then circumnavigated the world in her.) All Cal 25s are old, but they were very popular so lots of them are still around, and many are relatively inexpensive ... Best features: With a cast lead keel of 1,700 pounds, the Cal 25 ... is quite stiff in heavy air. It's a good first boat for folks who are handy with tools and want a boat that sails well and is forgiving. Worst features: The 4-foot draft means she is not convenient to launch on a ramp from a trailer, unless the ramp is steep and you can rig a tongue extension on the trailer."

== See also ==
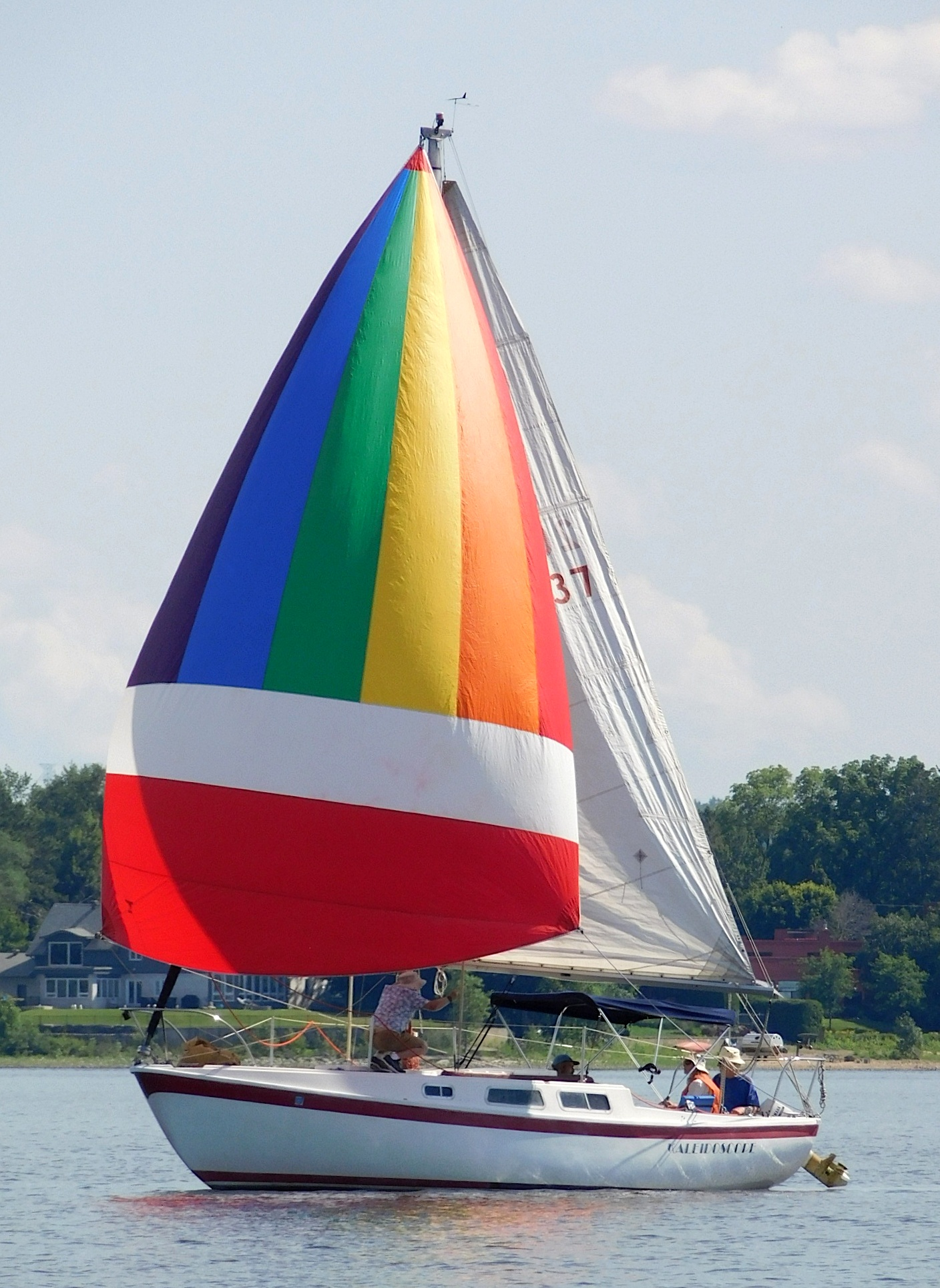
Cal 25 with spinnaker flying

- List of sailing boat types

Related development

- Cal 27
