= Cal Yachts =

American sailboat manufacturer

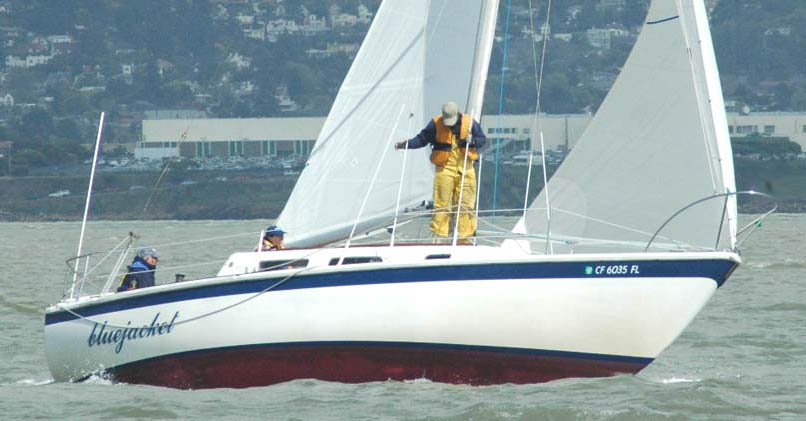
- Cal 29 Bluejacket in Berkeley YC, race on San Francisco Bay
- Formerly: Jensen Marine Corporation, Cal Boats
- Industry: Sailboats, motor homes
- Founded: 1957 in Costa Mesa, California
- Founder: Jack Jensen
- Defunct: 1989
- Fate: Acquired by Bangor Punta, Lear Siegler, Little Compton Yachts
- Headquarters: Costa Mesa, California, US
- Brands: Cal, Balboa

Cal Yachts (also known as Jensen Marine and Cal Boats) was a manufacturer of performance oriented fiberglass sailboats from the 1960s to the 1980s. The Costa Mesa, California, headquartered company was founded in 1957, among the earliest of all-fiberglass, mass-production sailboat builders. Although the brand has been out of production since 1989, the existing fleet is still substantially active in racing and cruising.

== History ==
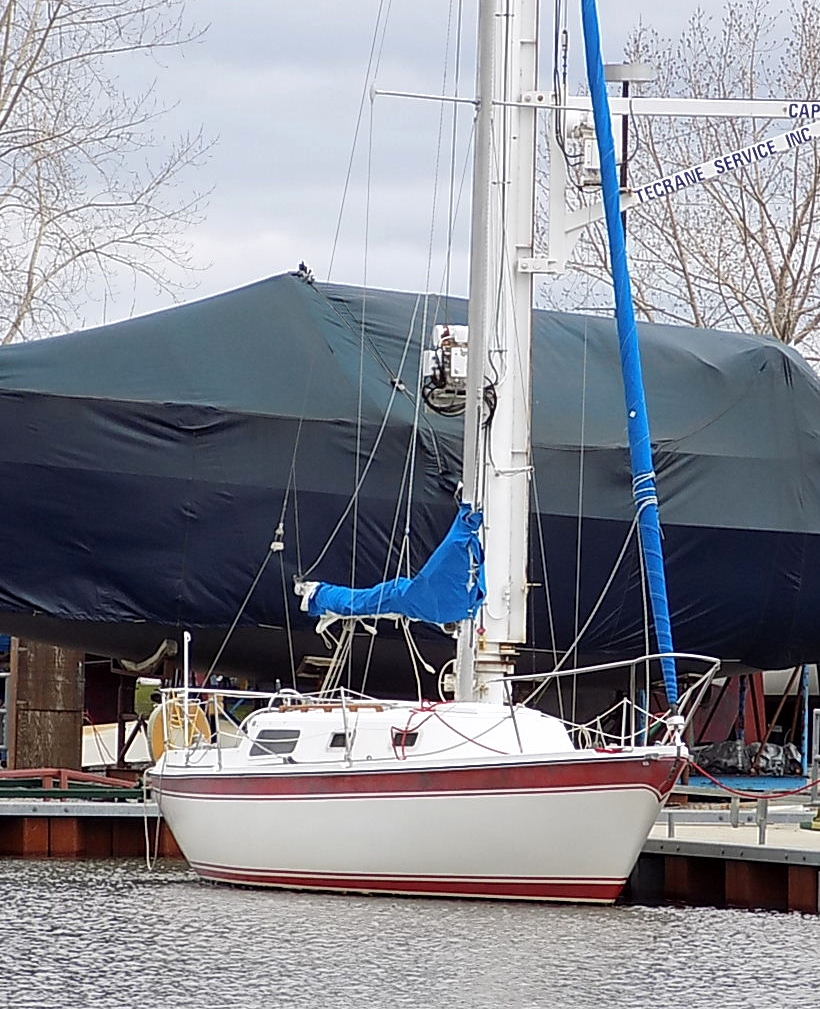
Cal 2-27

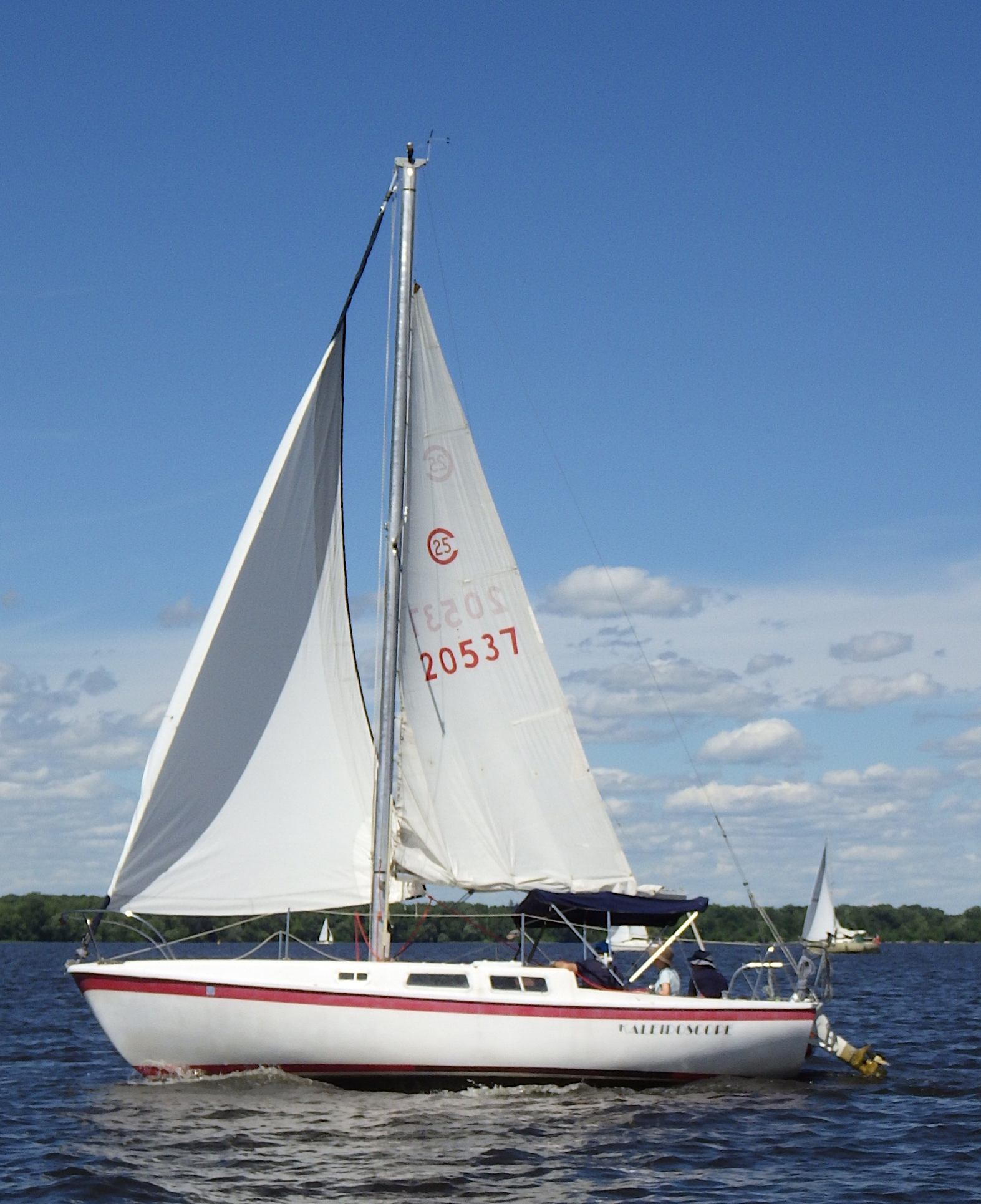
Cal 25

Cal Yachts was originally named the Jensen Marine Corporation after the founder, Jack Jensen, a fiberglass boat builder. He sold his company to Bangor Punta Corporation in 1968. Jensen later produced Ranger sailboats and a line of molded fiberglass recreational vehicles called "Balboa".

Nearly 18,000 boats were built under the Cal brand name. There were many different models – the first of the ultra-light, production ocean racers, the Cal 40 was inspired by ocean racer George Griffith, of the Los Angeles Yacht Club. Following Griffith's initial design, the Cal 40 was developed by naval architect C. William "Bill" Lapworth. Griffith sought out Jack Jensen to build the first boat, Persephone, but had to guarantee the sale of ten boats, which was quickly accomplished, even before the first boat was out of the mold. Lofting was performed by Willis Boyd. A major undertaking for its time and radically different from other production racing sailboats with its fin keel separated from a spade rudder mounted well aft, the Cal 40 astonished the yachting community by Don Salisbury's Hull #3 "Psyche" winning first overall in the 1965 Transpac with Griffith aboard. The Cal40 continues to rack up an impressive string of ocean racing victories more than five decades after its initial launch, winning major competitions such as the Newport-Bermuda Race as recently as 2022. Among other ocean racing classics, Cal 40s still compete as a class in the Transpac from Los Angeles to Honolulu and in 2005 recorded 14 entries.

== In popular culture ==
All Is Lost, the 2013 American survival film written and directed by J. C. Chandor and starring Robert Redford, includes turtling and sinking of the Cal 39 sailboat and the liferaft amidst the myriad disasters befalling the protagonist. Three of the yachts were used in production.

== See also ==
- List of sailboat designers and manufacturers
- Ranger Yachts, another yacht manufacturing business by Jensen
