= Hunter 290 =

Sailboat class

Development
- Designer: Hunter Design Team
- Location: United States
- Year: 1999
- Builder: Hunter Marine
- Name: Hunter 290

Boat
- Displacement: 7,400 lb (3,357 kg)
- Draft: 5.33 ft (1.62 m)

Hull
- Type: Monohull
- Construction: Fiberglass
- LOA: 28.58 ft (8.71 m)
- LWL: 26.92 ft (8.21 m)
- Beam: 10.75 ft (3.28 m)
- Engine: Yanmar 18 hp (13 kW) diesel engine

Hull appendages
- Keel: fin keel with a bulb weight
- Ballast: 2,550 lb (1,157 kg)
- Rudder: internally-mounted spade-type rudder

Rig
- Rig type: Bermuda rig
- I foretriangle height: 32.00 ft (9.75 m)
- J foretriangle base: 11.00 ft (3.35 m)
- P mainsail luff: 29.08 ft (8.86 m)
- E mainsail foot: 12.00 ft (3.66 m)

Sails
- Sailplan: Fractional B&R rigged sloop
- Mainsail area: 174.48 sq ft (16.210 m^{2})
- Jib/genoa area: 176.00 sq ft (16.351 m^{2})
- Total sail area: 350.48 sq ft (32.561 m^{2})

Racing
- PHRF: 186 (average)

The Hunter 290 is an American sailboat that was designed by the Hunter Design Team as a cruising boat and first built in 1999.

== Production ==
The design was built by Hunter Marine in the United States between 1999 and 2002, but it is now out of production.

== Design ==
The Hunter 290 is a recreational keelboat, built predominantly of fiberglass. It has a fractional sloop B&R rig, a raked stem, a walk-through reverse transom, an internally-mounted spade-type rudder controlled by a wheel and a fixed fin keel with a weighted bulb or optional wing keel. It displaces 7,400 lb (3,357 kg) and carries 2,550 lb (1,157 kg) of lead ballast.

The boat has a draft of 5.33 ft (1.62 m) with the standard keel and 3.50 ft (1.07 m) with the optional shoal draft keel.

The boat is fitted with a Japanese Yanmar diesel engine of 18 hp (13 kW). The fuel tank holds 20 U.S. gallons (76 L; 17 imp gal) and the fresh water tank has a capacity of 40 U.S. gallons (150 L; 33 imp gal).

Factory supplied standard equipment included a 110% roller furling jib, two self-tailing jib winches, arch-mounted mainsheet, rack and pinion steering, private forward cabin, aft stateroom, convertible dinette table, 74 in (188 cm) or stand-up cabin headroom, stainless steel sink, two burner stove, top-loading ice box, four plates, bowls and mugs, with built-in storage, Danforth anchor, fog horn, four life jackets. Optional equipment included a hot and cold transom shower, two-burner gimbaled LPG stove, spinnaker and associated rigging and winches, in-mast mainsail furling system, GPS and a bimini top.

The design has a PHRF racing average handicap of 186 with a high of 190 and a low of 186. It has a hull speed of 6.95 kn (12.87 km/h).

== See also ==
- List of sailing boat types
