= Marlow-Hunter 47 =

Sailboat class

Development
- Designer: Hunter Design Team
- Location: United States
- Year: 2016
- Builder: Marlow-Hunter
- Name: Marlow-Hunter 47

Boat
- Displacement: 36,000 lb (16,329 kg)
- Draft: 5.50 ft (1.68 m)

Hull
- Type: Monohull
- Construction: Fiberglass
- LOA: 50.50 ft (15.39 m)
- LWL: 44.67 ft (13.62 m)
- Beam: 15.00 ft (4.57 m)
- Engine: Yanmar 80 hp (60 kW) diesel engine

Hull appendages
- Keel: wing keel
- Ballast: 12,500 lb (5,670 kg)
- Rudder: internally-mounted spade-type rudder

Rig
- Rig type: Bermuda rig

Sails
- Sailplan: Fractional B&R rigged sloop
- Mainsail area: 1,277 sq ft (118.6 m^{2})

The Marlow-Hunter 47 is an American sailboat that was designed by the Hunter Design Team as a cruiser and first built in 2016.

== Production ==
The design was built by Hunter Marine in the United States, starting in 2016 and remained in production through 2019.

== Design ==
The Marlow-Hunter 47 is a recreational keelboat, built predominantly of vinylester fiberglass, with a Nida-core sandwich and Kevlar reinforcing, with a hard chine hull. It has a fractional sloop B&R rig, a nearly plumb stem, a reverse transom with a fold-down swimming platform, telescoping ladder and a dinghy garage, an internally mounted spade-type rudder controlled by a wheel and a fixed deep fin keel or optional wing keel. The deep fin keel model displaces 36,000 lb (16,329 kg) and carries 9,093 lb (4,125 kg) of ballast, while the wing keel version displaces 32,793 lb (14,875 kg) and carries 12,500 lb (5,670 kg) of ballast.

The boat has a draft of 7.00 ft (2.13 m) with the deep fin keel and 5.50 ft (1.68 m) with the shoal draft wing keel.

The steering wheel is hydraulically-canting and can be pivoted though 90° as desired by the helmsman. This provides the advantages of a dual-wheel configuration, but occupies less cockpit space. The wheel also folds when not in use.

The boat is fitted with a Japanese Yanmar diesel engine of 80 hp (60 kW). The fuel tank holds 150 U.S. gallons (570 L; 120 imp gal) and the fresh water tank has a capacity of 194 U.S. gallons (730 L; 162 imp gal), while the holding tank has a capacity of 52 U.S. gallons (200 L; 43 imp gal). Below decks headroom is 81 in (206 cm).

Factory options include roller furling jib and mast-furling mainsail.

== Operational history ==
Writing for Sailing magazine in May 2016, famed yacht designer Robert Perry wrote, "This design is all about the interior and to my eye it looks very good. ... Suffice to say you will be quite comfortable on this 47-footer. ... I can see this new model having a lot of appeal for a lot of people looking for a comfortable ride".

In an August 2016 review Cruising World, noted "The Marlow-Hunter 47 marches to a different beat, with design concepts borrowed from the power side of the company. A raised cabin top features windows all around and provides room below for multilevel accommodations and a raised saloon sole that lets you sit up to enjoy the view."

In a March 2017 review in Pacific Yachting Sven Donaldson wrote, "The new Marlow Hunter 47 is similar in size to the current MH-50 centre cockpit and aft cockpit models, but there's no question that it's targeting a more exalted market niche. The basic concept is what I'd call a classic deck salon arrangement that situates the "great cabin" and galley in an elevated central space beneath a tall, traditional-looking coach house. Overhanging "eyebrows" shield the wrap-around windows, and the clean, flat cabin top serves as an excellent lounging area. Because the main cabin sole is raised, it's only three steps down from the cockpit, so moving between the two principle social areas is comparatively easy." He concluded, "The new MH-47 is quite novel both in design and execution—not at all what one might ordinarily expect from a mass production builder. On the other hand, the Hunter legacy is one of innovation, so it's not entirely surprising to see another unusual yacht emerge from this quarter. This particular Marlow Hunter won't be a mass-market boat, nor is it intended to be."

A May 2017 review in Blue Water Sailing noted, "The all new Marlow Hunter 47 offers her owners an aft cockpit, raised-deck saloon configuration that optimizes living space and comfort at sea. With the standard B & R rig and small headsail, the 47 will be easy to sail and should be fast off the wind. The accommodations offer a great master cabin forward with a huge head and lots of storage".

A 2018 write-up in Specialty Yachts wrote of the design, "the new Marlow Hunter 47 is the boat of the future. With her own incredibly unique style, unlike anything currently available, this boat will blow you out of the water!"

== See also ==
- List of sailing boat types

Similar sailboats

- C&C 50
- Hunter HC 50
- Marlow-Hunter 50
- Marlow-Hunter 50 Center Cockpit
