= Hunter 39 =

Sailboat class

Development
- Designer: Glenn Henderson
- Location: United States
- Year: 2009
- Builder: Hunter Marine
- Name: Hunter 39

Boat
- Displacement: 18,077 lb (8,200 kg)
- Draft: 6.50 ft (1.98 m)

Hull
- Type: Monohull
- Construction: Fiberglass
- LOA: 39.42 ft (12.02 m)
- LWL: 34.67 ft (10.57 m)
- Beam: 12.92 ft (3.94 m)
- Engine: Yanmar 29 hp (22 kW) diesel engine

Hull appendages
- Keel: fin keel
- Ballast: 5,603 lb (2,541 kg)
- Rudder: internally-mounted spade-type rudder

Rig
- Rig type: Bermuda rig
- I foretriangle height: 46.67 ft (14.23 m)
- J foretriangle base: 12.08 ft (3.68 m)
- P mainsail luff: 47.42 ft (14.45 m)
- E mainsail foot: 19.25 ft (5.87 m)

Sails
- Sailplan: Fractional B&R rigged sloop
- Mainsail area: 456.42 sq ft (42.403 m^{2})
- Jib/genoa area: 281.89 sq ft (26.188 m^{2})
- Total sail area: 738.30 sq ft (68.590 m^{2})

The Hunter 39 (also called the Marlow-Hunter 39) is an American sailboat that was designed by Glenn Henderson as a cruiser and first built in 2009.

The Hunter 39 was designed as the production successor to the Hunter 38.

== Production ==
The design was built by Hunter Marine in the United States between 2009 and 2012, but it is now out of production.

Hunter Marine became Marlow-Hunter in 2012, just as production of the Hunter 39 was ending and the design was also marketed under the designation Marlow-Hunter 39.

== Design ==
The Hunter 39 is a recreational keelboat, built predominantly of fiberglass. It has a fractional sloop B&R rig, a plumb stem, a walk-through reverse transom with a swimming platform and folding ladder, an internally mounted spade-type rudder controlled by dual wheel and a fixed fin keel or optional shoal-draft wing keel.

The boat has a draft of 6.50 ft (1.98 m) with the standard deep fin keel and 5.00 ft (1.52 m) with the optional shoal draft wing keel.

The boat is fitted with a Japanese Yanmar diesel engine of 29 hp (22 kW). A 40 hp (30 kW) engine was a factory option. The fuel tank holds 36 U.S. gallons (140 L; 30 imp gal) and the fresh water tank has a capacity of 75 U.S. gallons (280 L; 62 imp gal).

Factory standard equipment included a 110% roller furling genoa, steel mainsheet arch, four two-speed self tailing winches, marine VHF radio, knotmeter, depth sounder, AM/FM radio and CD player, dual anchor rollers, hot and cold water cockpit shower, fully enclosed head with shower, private forward and aft cabins, a dinette table that converts to a berth, complete set of kitchen dishes, microwave oven, dual stainless steel sinks and a two-burner gimbaled liquid petroleum gas stove and oven. Factory options included a liferaft and EPIRB, a double aft cabin, Bimini top, air conditioning, electric anchor winch and leather cushions.

== Operational history ==
At its launch Sail magazine noted the design's long waterline length, new windows and twin wheels.

In a 2010 review in Cruising World Alvah Simon noted the strong construction and B&R rig. Of the sailing performance Simon wrote: "Out on the water, the boat tacked handily, even in the 8 to 10 knots of wind we experienced during our test sail on the Chesapeake. The near-plum stem extends the waterline length to 34 feet 8 inches, resulting in a moderate displacement-to-length ratio of 220 that indicates that the boat should be able to muscle through some chop. And the sail area-to-displacement ratio of 19.4 suggests the boat will deliver a good turn of speed in stronger winds. Overall, it should prove weatherly, especially if fit with the deep keel."

== Variants ==
Hunter 39 Deep Keel
This model displaces 18,077 lb (8,200 kg) and carries 5,603 lb (2,541 kg) of ballast. The boat has a draft of 6.50 ft (1.98 m) with the standard deep fin keel.
Hunter 39 Wing Keel
This model displaces 18,501 lb (8,392 kg) and carries 6,027 lb (2,734 kg) of ballast. The boat has a draft of 5.00 ft (1.52 m) with the optional wing keel.

== See also ==
- List of sailing boat types
