= Hunter 270 =

Sailboat class

Development
- Location: United States
- Year: 2000
- Builder: Hunter Marine
- Name: Hunter 270

Boat
- Displacement: 5,000 lb (2,268 kg)
- Draft: 3.50 ft (1.07 m)

Hull
- Type: Monohull
- Construction: Fiberglass
- LOA: 26.25 ft (8.00 m)
- LWL: 23.25 ft (7.09 m)
- Beam: 8.95 ft (2.73 m)
- Engine: Yanmar 9 hp (7 kW) diesel engine or outboard motor

Hull appendages
- Keel: wing keel
- Rudder: transom-mounted rudder

Rig
- Rig type: Bermuda rig
- I foretriangle height: 26.25 ft (8.00 m)
- J foretriangle base: 9.42 ft (2.87 m)
- P mainsail luff: 30.51 ft (9.30 m)
- E mainsail foot: 10.50 ft (3.20 m)

Sails
- Sailplan: Fractional rigged sloop
- Mainsail area: 160.18 sq ft (14.881 m^{2})
- Jib/genoa area: 123.64 sq ft (11.487 m^{2})
- Total sail area: 283.82 sq ft (26.368 m^{2})

Racing
- PHRF: 222 (average)

The Hunter 270 is an American sailboat that was designed for cruising and first built in 2000.

== Production ==
The design was built by Hunter Marine in the United States, but it is now out of production.

== Design ==
The Hunter 270 is a recreational keelboat, built predominantly of fiberglass. It has a fractional sloop rig with a full-batten mainsail, a nearly plumb stem, a walk-through reverse transom, a transom-hung rudder controlled by a wheel and a fixed wing keel. It displaces 5,000 lb (2,268 kg).

The boat has a draft of 3.50 ft (1.07 m) with the standard wing keel fitted.

The boat is normally fitted with a small outboard motor for docking and maneuvering but had an original factory option of a Japanese Yanmar inboard diesel engine of 9 hp (7 kW). The fuel tank holds 15 U.S. gallons (57 L; 12 imp gal) and the fresh water tank has a capacity of 20 U.S. gallons (76 L; 17 imp gal).

Standard equipment supplied included masthead anchor lights, an enclosed head, teak and holly cabin sole, a butane stove, kitchen dishes, portable cooler, anchor, stainless steel boarding ladder and life jackets. Factory optional equipment included a Bimini top, road trailer, roller furler, spinnaker and a marine VHF radio.

The design has a PHRF racing average handicap of 222 with a high of 234 and low of 215. It has a hull speed of 6.46 kn (11.96 km/h).

== See also ==
- List of sailing boat types
