= Marlow-Hunter 50 Center Cockpit =

Sailboat class

Development
- Designer: Hunter Design Team
- Location: United States
- Year: 2009
- Builder: Hunter Marine
- Name: Marlow-Hunter 50 Center Cockpit

Boat
- Displacement: 35,661 lb (16,176 kg)
- Draft: 7.00 ft (2.13 m)

Hull
- Type: Monohull
- Construction: Fiberglass
- LOA: 49.92 ft (15.22 m)
- LWL: 43.83 ft (13.36 m)
- Beam: 14.75 ft (4.50 m)
- Engine: Yanmar 75 hp (56 kW) diesel engine

Hull appendages
- Keel: fin keel
- Ballast: 11,216 lb (5,087 kg)
- Rudder: internally-mounted spade-type rudder

Rig
- Rig type: Cutter rig
- I foretriangle height: 54.58 ft (16.64 m)
- J foretriangle base: 16.50 ft (5.03 m)
- P mainsail luff: 51.58 ft (15.72 m)
- E mainsail foot: 21.83 ft (6.65 m)

Sails
- Sailplan: Fractional B&R rigged sloop
- Mainsail area: 563.00 sq ft (52.304 m^{2})
- Jib/genoa area: 450.29 sq ft (41.833 m^{2})
- Total sail area: 1,013.00 sq ft (94.111 m^{2})

The Marlow-Hunter 50 Center Cockpit, also called the Marlow-Hunter 50CC is an American sailboat that was designed by the Hunter Design Team as a cruiser and first built in 2010.

The design was originally marketed by Hunter Marine as the Hunter 50 CC (for Center Cockpit), but the company became Marlow-Hunter in 2012 and the boat was renamed the Marlow-Hunter 50 Center Cockpit.

== Production ==
The design was built by Hunter Marine in the United States starting in 2009 and remained in production in 2019.

== Design ==
The Marlow-Hunter 50 Center Cockpit is a recreational keelboat, built predominantly of fiberglass. It has a B&R rig fractional sloop rig, a raked stem, a center cockpit, a walk-through reverse transom with a swimming platform and folding ladder, an internally mounted spade-type rudder controlled by a wheel and a fixed fin keel or wing keel. The fin keel version it displaces 35,661 lb (16,176 kg) and carries 11,216 lb (5,087 kg) of ballast, while the wing keel version displaces 36,945 lb (16,758 kg) and carries 12,500 lb (5,670 kg) of ballast.

The boat has a draft of 7.00 ft (2.13 m) with the standard keel and 5.5 ft (1.7 m) with the optional shoal draft wing keel.

The boat is fitted with a Japanese Yanmar diesel engine of 75 hp (56 kW). The fuel tank holds 150 U.S. gallons (570 L; 120 imp gal) and the fresh water tank has a capacity of 200 U.S. gallons (760 L; 170 imp gal).

Standard equipment includes a mast furling mainsail, mainsheet traveler on a stainless steel arch. Options include a single jib in a bermuda rig or a staysail with overlapping jib in a cutter rig, and a tall mast about 5.1 ft (1.6 m) higher.

The design has a hull speed of 8.87 kn (16.43 km/h).

== Operational history ==
In a 2009 review, Cruising World editor Mark Pillsbury noted the design's 80 in (203.20 cm) below decks headroom, roomy accommodations and easy engine access but faulted the lack of on-deck handholds. About amenities, he stated, "Aboard the 50 CC, however, the real luxury is found aft, where a chaise lounge on the port quarter and a settee to starboard frame an island queen that incorporates a three-panel base that can be folded back to unveil a full-size tub with jets. This was a standard feature on the first few hulls, but it was made an option on later ones at the request of buyers who said they'd take additional storage over bubbles." Of the sailing qualities, he wrote, "Sailing upwind in a brisk breeze, we saw boat speeds in the high 6- and low 7-knot range. On a beam reach, we did a little better than 8 knots over the ground, according to my handheld GPS. In the rough seas we encountered, the rack-and-pinion steering felt a little sluggish, but that may have been because it hadn't yet been adjusted."

Also in a 2009 review, Sailing magazine writer Bill Springer noted, "Hunters have always been known for spacious accommodations, and this boat won our Best Boats award for excellence in accommodation. The slightly raised saloon is bright and airy, thanks to large fixed windows and multiple opening ports and hatches and you get a good view." He concluded, "It’s easy to get distracted by the hot tub and the TV in every cabin and the “admiral’s seat,” but in truth there’s more than that to this boat. It’s a big sister to the 49, an example of which has just circumnavigated. The sails are easy to handle, and the hull is big and heavy enough to stand up to a breeze. And having a boat that’s well equipped and offers the comforts of home is not a bad thing at all."

In naming the design the 2009 Best Boats - Accommodations, Sailing magazine writer Nigel Calder, stated, "the Hunter 50 surely has raised the bar for cruising sailboats much higher than it has ever been before."

== See also ==
- List of sailing boat types

Related development

- Marlow-Hunter 50

Similar sailboats

- C&C 50
- Hunter HC 50
- Marlow-Hunter 47
