= Marlow-Hunter 50 =

Sailboat class

Development
- Designer: Hunter Design Team
- Location: United States
- Year: 2010
- Builder: Hunter Marine
- Name: Marlow-Hunter 50

Boat
- Displacement: 29,406 lb (13,338 kg)
- Draft: 7.00 ft (2.13 m)

Hull
- Type: Monohull
- Construction: Fiberglass
- LOA: 49.92 ft (15.22 m)
- LWL: 43.83 ft (13.36 m)
- Beam: 14.75 ft (4.50 m)
- Engine: Yanmar 75 hp (56 kW) diesel engine

Hull appendages
- Keel: fin keel
- Ballast: 9,093 lb (4,125 kg)
- Rudder: internally-mounted spade-type rudder

Rig
- Rig type: Cutter rig
- I foretriangle height: 54.58 ft (16.64 m)
- J foretriangle base: 16.50 ft (5.03 m)
- P mainsail luff: 51.58 ft (15.72 m)
- E mainsail foot: 21.83 ft (6.65 m)

Sails
- Sailplan: B&R rigged Masthead sloop
- Mainsail area: 563.00 sq ft (52.304 m^{2})
- Jib/genoa area: 450.29 sq ft (41.833 m^{2})
- Total sail area: 1,277.00 sq ft (118.637 m^{2})

The Marlow-Hunter 50 is an American sailboat that was designed by the Hunter Design Team as a cruiser and first built in 2010.

The design was originally marketed by Hunter Marine as the Hunter 50 AC (for Aft Cockpit), but the company became Marlow-Hunter in 2012 and the boat was renamed the Marlow-Hunter 50.

== Production ==
The design was built by Hunter Marine in the United States starting in 2010 and remained in production in 2019.

== Design ==
The Marlow-Hunter 50 is a recreational keelboat, built predominantly of fiberglass. It has a B&R rig masthead sloop rig, a raked stem, an aft cockpit, a walk-through reverse transom with a swimming platform and folding ladder, an internally mounted spade-type rudder controlled by dual wheels and a fixed fin keel or wing keel. The fin keel version it displaces 29,406 lb (13,338 kg) and carries 9,093 lb (4,125 kg) of ballast, while the wing keel version displaces 32,813 lb (14,884 kg) and carries 12,500 lb (5,670 kg) of ballast.

The boat has a draft of 7.00 ft (2.13 m) with the standard keel and 5.5 ft (1.7 m) with the optional shoal draft wing keel.

The boat is fitted with a Japanese Yanmar diesel engine of 75 hp (56 kW). The fuel tank holds 150 U.S. gallons (570 L; 120 imp gal) and the fresh water tank has a capacity of 200 U.S. gallons (760 L; 170 imp gal).

Standard equipment includes a mast furling mainsail, mainsheet traveler on a stainless steel arch. Options include a single self-tacking jib or a self-tacking staysail with overlapping jib in a cutter rig. There are two window arrangements, an earlier one with five individual side ports and a later one with five ports in a sweeping arch.

The design has a hull speed of 8.87 kn (16.43 km/h).

== Operational history ==
In a 2011 review, Cruising World writer Herb McCormick noted the large range of options that allow for a high degree of customization of the boat to customer's desires. "For instance, there are shoal-draft and deep-draft keel and ballast choices (5 feet 6 inches and 12,544 pounds or 7 feet and 11,216 pounds, respectively); standard or tall rigs (63 feet 4 inches and 68 feet 6 inches, both measured from the waterline); regular or more robust Yanmar diesels (75 horsepower or 110 horsepower), and even two different ways of approaching the headsails and foretriangle configuration (a single self-tacking jib or a self-tacking staysail with an overlapping jib). Regarding the latter, of course, either headsail arrangement is paired with Hunter’s “backstayless” B&R rig, a mainsheet traveler arch, and a battened, full-roach mainsail. For the Hunter Design Team, some things are too iconic to mess with."

upon the design's introduction, a brief Sail magazine staff report noted, "Below decks excellent use has been made of the hull's considerable volume, with all the deft touches Hunter owners have come to expect."

== See also ==
- List of sailing boat types

Related development

- Marlow-Hunter 50 Center Cockpit

Similar sailboats

- C&C 50
- Hunter HC 50
- Marlow-Hunter 47
