= Hunter 212 =

Sailboat class

Development
- Designer: Chuck Burns
- Location: United States
- Year: 1996
- Builder: Hunter Marine
- Name: Hunter 212

Boat
- Displacement: 1,800 lb (816 kg)
- Draft: 5.00 ft (1.52 m)

Hull
- Type: Monohull
- Construction: ACP
- LOA: 21.00 ft (6.40 m)
- LWL: 18.00 ft (5.49 m)
- Beam: 9.17 ft (2.80 m)
- Engine: Outboard motor

Hull appendages
- Keel: centerboard
- Ballast: 140 lb (64 kg)
- Rudder: transom-mounted rudder

Rig
- Rig type: Bermuda rig
- I foretriangle height: 21.00 ft (6.40 m)
- J foretriangle base: 7.92 ft (2.41 m)
- P mainsail luff: 23.67 ft (7.21 m)
- E mainsail foot: 10.00 ft (3.05 m)

Sails
- Sailplan: Fractional B&R rigged sloop
- Mainsail area: 118.35 sq ft (10.995 m^{2})
- Jib/genoa area: 83.16 sq ft (7.726 m^{2})
- Total sail area: 201.51 sq ft (18.721 m^{2})

Racing
- PHRF: 216 (average)

The Hunter 212 is an American trailerable sailboat that was designed by Chuck Burns as a day sailer and cruiser and first built in 1996.

== Production ==
The design was built by Hunter Marine in the United States between 1996 and 2002, but it is now out of production.

== Design ==
The Hunter 212 is a small recreational keelboat, built predominantly of ACP. It has a fractional sloop B&R rig, a slightly raked stem, an open reverse transom, a transom-hung swing-up rudder controlled by a tiller and a centerboard keel. It displaces 1,800 lb (816 kg) and carries 140 lb (64 kg) of fixed ballast.

The boat has a draft of 5.00 ft (1.52 m) with the centreboard extended and 0.83 ft (0.25 m) with it retracted, allowing beaching or ground transportation on a trailer.

The boat is normally fitted with a small 3 to 6 hp (2 to 4 kW) outboard motor for docking and maneuvering.

Standard factory equipment included a portable head, cooler and a highway trailer. Optional equipment included an asymmetrical spinnaker, roller furler, front hatch and a bimini top and dodger, as well netting for the open transom.

The design has sleeping accommodation for four people, with a double "V"-berth in the bow cabin and two straight settee berths in the main cabin. The galley is on the port side, under the bow berth. The head is located in the bow cabin on the starboard side under the "V"-berth. Cabin headroom is 52 in (132 cm).

The design has a PHRF racing average handicap of 216. It has a hull speed of 5.69 kn (10.54 km/h).

== Operational history ==
In a 2010 review Steve Henkel wrote, "Hunter 212 shares the same bulbous 'modern' look with several other Hunter boats, but is different in that she is made with a non-fiberglass plastic material Hunter ads identified only as ACP, or Advanced Composite Process—'five times more impact resistant than fiberglass' and the hulls were molded by JY Sailboats in a joint venture arrangement. The construction involves a sandwich with 18" thick sheet of ABS plastic, and an inch or more of closed cell foam with a fiberglass mat backing. Best features: With a board-up draft of ten inches and an optional mast raising device that is designed for one person to use, the Hunter 212 should be easier than most ... to launch at a ramp. Worst features: The only ballast is the 135-pound weighted centerboard, so practically all the vessel's stability is derived from the form of the hull plus the crew’' weight. From this we would guess her stability in a breeze would be considerably worse than any of her comp[etitor]s. As for the 'ACP' material, it requires special adhesives to bond repairs. Plain resins, epoxy, or marine fillers won't stick and hold."

== See also ==
- List of sailing boat types

Similar sailboats

- Hunter 216
- Mistral T-21
- San Juan 21
- Sirius 22
