= Moorings 295 =

Sailboat class

Development
- Location: United States
- Year: 1994
- Design: Hunter Design Team
- Builder: Hunter Marine
- Name: Moorings 295

Boat
- Displacement: 7,500 lb (3,402 kg)
- Draft: 4.00 ft (1.22 m)

Hull
- Type: Monohull
- Construction: Fiberglass
- LOA: 29.50 ft (8.99 m)
- LWL: 27.00 ft (8.23 m)
- Beam: 10.50 ft (3.20 m)
- Engine: Yanmar diesel inboard motor

Hull appendages
- Keel: fin keel
- Ballast: 2,680 lb (1,216 kg)
- Rudder: internally-mounted spade-type rudder

Rig
- Rig type: Bermuda rig

Sails
- Sailplan: fractional sloop
- Total sail area: 400.00 sq ft (37.161 m^{2})

The Moorings 335 is an American sailboat that was designed by the Hunter Design Team for Moorings Yacht Charter and first built in 1994.

The Moorings 335 is a development of the Hunter 29.5 specially for the charter market.

== Production ==
The design was built for Moorings by Hunter Marine in the United States, but it is now out of production. The design is no longer in service with Moorings and the fleet has been sold for private use.

== Design ==
The Moorings 295 is a recreational keelboat, built predominantly of fiberglass. It has a fractional sloop rig, an internally-mounted spade-type rudder controlled by a wheel and a fixed fin keel. It displaces 7,500 lb (3,402 kg) and carries 2,680 lb (1,216 kg) of ballast.

The boat has a draft of 4.00 ft (1.22 m) with the standard keel fitted.

The design has a hull speed of 6.96 kn (12.89 km/h).

== See also ==
- List of sailing boat types

Related development

- Hunter 29.5
- Moorings 335

Similar sailboats

- C&C 30
- Cal 29
- Catalina 30
- CS 30
- Hunter 30
- Hunter 30T
- Hunter 30-2
- Hunter 306
- Kirby 30
- Mirage 30
- Mirage 30 SX
- Nonsuch 30
