= Hunter 280 =

Sailboat class

Development
- Designer: Hunter Design Team and Rob Mazza
- Location: United States
- Year: 1995
- Builder: Hunter Marine

Boat
- Displacement: 6,500 lb (2,948 kg)
- Draft: 5.00 ft (1.52 m)

Hull
- Type: Monohull
- Construction: Fiberglass
- LOA: 27.75 ft (8.46 m)
- LWL: 23.58 ft (7.19 m)
- Beam: 9.63 ft (2.94 m)
- Engine: Yanmar 18 hp (13 kW) diesel engine

Hull appendages
- Keel: fin keel
- Ballast: 2,100 lb (953 kg)
- Rudder: internally-mounted spade-type rudder

Rig
- Rig type: Bermuda rig
- I foretriangle height: 31.50 ft (9.60 m)
- J foretriangle base: 9.42 ft (2.87 m)
- P mainsail luff: 31.67 ft (9.65 m)
- E mainsail foot: 12.00 ft (3.66 m)

Sails
- Sailplan: Fractional B&R rigged sloop
- Mainsail area: 190.02 sq ft (17.653 m^{2})
- Jib/genoa area: 148.37 sq ft (13.784 m^{2})
- Total sail area: 338.39 sq ft (31.437 m^{2})

Racing
- PHRF: 186 (average)

The Hunter 280 is an American sailboat that was designed by the Hunter Design Team in conjunction with Rob Mazza, as a cruising boat and first built in 1995.

The design replaced the Hunter 28 in the company line, which had been produced from 1989 to 1994.

== Production ==
The design was built by Hunter Marine in the United States between 1995 and 1999, but it is now out of production.

== Design ==
The Hunter 280 is a recreational keelboat, built predominantly of fiberglass. It has a fractional sloop B&R rig with a full-batten mainsail and 110% genoa, a raked stem, a walk-through reverse transom with a swimming platform, an internally-mounted spade-type rudder controlled by a wheel or an optional tiller and a fixed fin keel or option shoal-draft wing keel. It displaces 6,500 lb (2,948 kg) and carries 2,100 lb (953 kg) of ballast.

The boat has a draft of 5.00 ft (1.52 m) with the standard keel and 3.50 ft (1.07 m) with the optional shoal draft wing keel.

The boat is fitted with a Japanese Yanmar diesel engine of 18 hp (13 kW), with a 9 hp (7 kW) optional. The fuel tank holds 20 U.S. gallons (76 L; 17 imp gal) and the fresh water tank has a capacity of 40 U.S. gallons (150 L; 33 imp gal).

Standard factory equipment supplied included self-tailing winches, double lifelines, a teak and holly cabin sole, a dinette table that converts to a berth, four opening ports, an enclosed head with a 20 U.S. gallons (76 L; 17 imp gal) holding tank, shower, icebox, kitchen dishes, anchor, fog horn and life jackets. The boat has sleeping accommodation for six people. Optional equipment included a spinnaker and an LPG stove.

The design has a PHRF racing average handicap of 186 with a high of 192 and low of 180. It has a hull speed of 6.51 kn (12.06 km/h).

== See also ==
- List of sailing boat types

Similar sailboats

- Aloha 28
- Beneteau First 285
- Cal 28
- Catalina 28
- Cumulus 28
- Grampian 28
- Hunter 28
- J/28
- O'Day 28
- Pearson 28
- Sabre 28
- Sea Sprite 27
- Sirius 28
- Tanzer 28
- TES 28 Magnam
- Viking 28
