= Hunter 25.5 =

Sailboat class

Development
- Designer: Cortland Steck
- Location: United States
- Year: 1984
- Builder: Hunter Marine
- Name: Hunter 25.5

Boat
- Displacement: 4,500 lb (2,041 kg)
- Draft: 4.50 ft (1.37 m)

Hull
- Type: Monohull
- Construction: Fiberglass
- LOA: 25.58 ft (7.80 m)
- LWL: 22.08 ft (6.73 m)
- Beam: 9.08 ft (2.77 m)
- Engine: Outboard motor

Hull appendages
- Keel: fin keel
- Ballast: 1,800 lb (816 kg)
- Rudder: transom-mounted rudder

Rig
- Rig type: Bermuda rig
- I foretriangle height: 31.00 ft (9.45 m)
- J foretriangle base: 10.00 ft (3.05 m)
- P mainsail luff: 26.42 ft (8.05 m)
- E mainsail foot: 10.00 ft (3.05 m)

Sails
- Sailplan: Masthead sloop
- Mainsail area: 132.10 sq ft (12.272 m^{2})
- Jib/genoa area: 155.00 sq ft (14.400 m^{2})
- Total sail area: 287.10 sq ft (26.672 m^{2})

Racing
- PHRF: 210 (average)

The Hunter 25.5 is an American sailboat that was designed by Cortland Steck and first built in 1984.

== Production ==
The design was built by Hunter Marine in the United States between 1984 and 1987, but it is now out of production.

== Design ==
The Hunter 25.5 is a recreational keelboat, built predominantly of fiberglass, with wood trim. It has a masthead sloop rig, a raked stem, a vertical transom, a transom-hung rudder controlled by a tiller and a fixed fin keel. It displaces 4,500 lb (2,041 kg) and carries 1,600 lb (726 kg) of ballast.

The boat has a draft of 4.50 ft (1.37 m) with the standard keel and 3.33 ft (1.01 m) with the optional shoal draft wing keel.

The boat is normally fitted with a small outboard motor for docking and maneuvering.

The fin keel version of the design has a PHRF racing average handicap of 210 with a high of 204 and low of 231. The wing keel version has a PHRF racing average handicap of 213 with a high of 198 and low of 234. It has a hull speed of 6.3 kn (11.67 km/h).

== See also ==
- List of sailing boat types
