= Hunter 23 =

Sailboat class

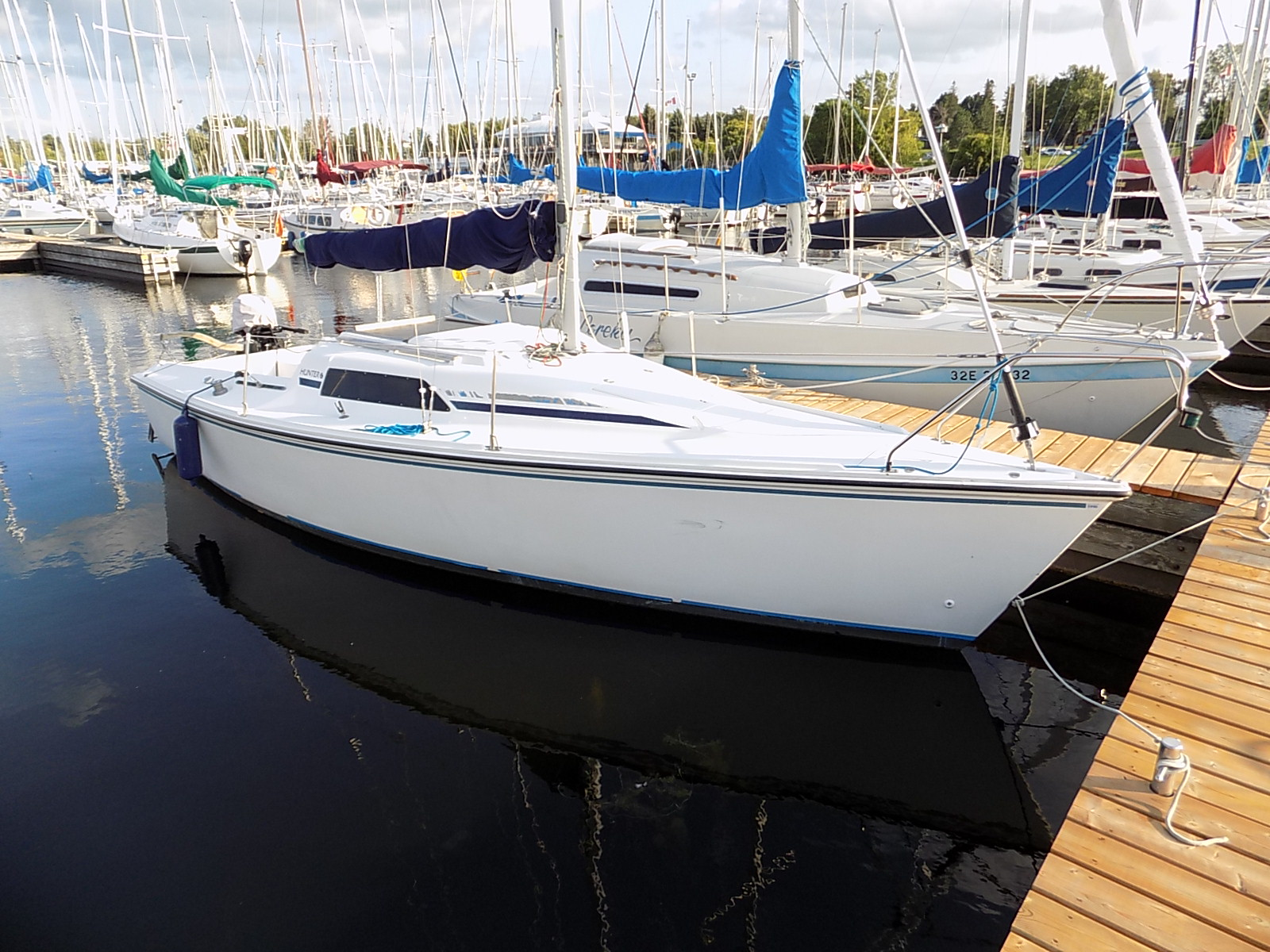

Development
- Designer: Hunter Marine
- Location: United States
- Year: 1985
- Builder: Hunter Marine
- Name: Hunter 23

Boat
- Displacement: 2,450 lb (1,111 kg)
- Draft: 2.25 ft (0.69 m)

Hull
- Type: Monohull
- Construction: Fiberglass
- LOA: 23.25 ft (7.09 m)
- LWL: 19.58 ft (5.97 m)
- Beam: 8.00 ft (2.44 m)
- Engine: Outboard motor

Hull appendages
- Keel: wing keel
- Ballast: 800 lb (363 kg)
- Rudder: transom-mounted rudder

Rig
- Rig type: Bermuda rig
- I foretriangle height: 26.00 ft (7.92 m)
- J foretriangle base: 8.50 ft (2.59 m)
- P mainsail luff: 25.67 ft (7.82 m)
- E mainsail foot: 9.75 ft (2.97 m)

Sails
- Sailplan: Fractional rigged sloop
- Mainsail area: 125.14 sq ft (11.626 m^{2})
- Jib/genoa area: 110.50 sq ft (10.266 m^{2})
- Total sail area: 235.64 sq ft (21.892 m^{2})

Racing
- PHRF: 237 (average)

The Hunter 23 is an American trailerable sailboat, that was designed by Hunter Marine and first built in 1985.

== Production ==
The design was built by Hunter Marine in the United States from 1985 and 1992, but it is now out of production.

== Design ==
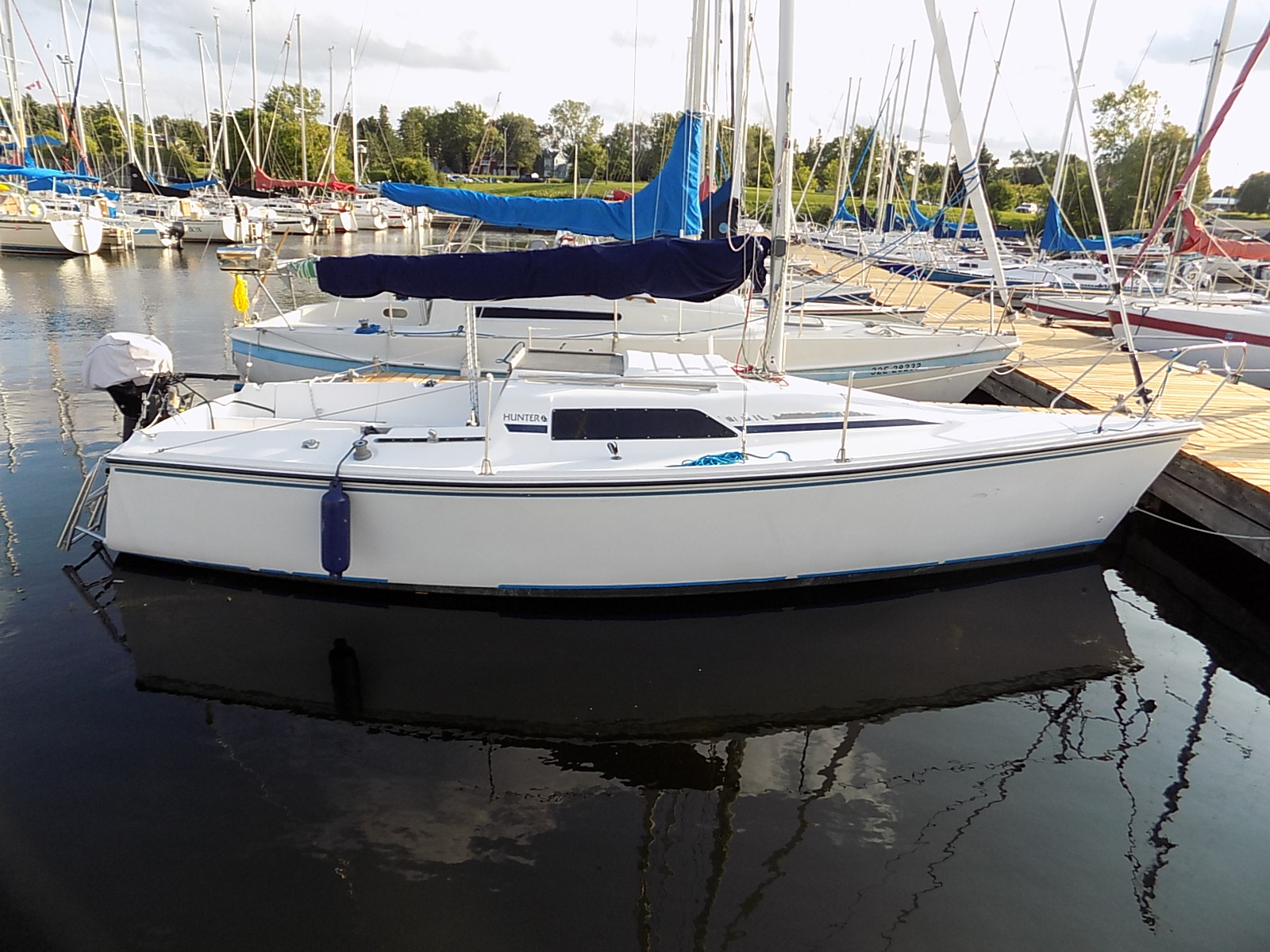
Hunter 23

The Hunter 23 is a small recreational keelboat, built predominantly of fiberglass, with wood trim. It has a fractional sloop rig, a raked stem, a reverse transom, a transom-hung rudder controlled by a tiller and a fixed wing keel or centerboard. It displaces 2,450 lb (1,111 kg) and carries 800 lb (363 kg) of ballast.

The wing keel-equipped version of the boat has a draft of 2.25 ft (0.69 m), while the centreboard-equipped version has a draft of 4.90 ft (1.49 m) with the centreboard extended and 2.0 ft (0.61 m) with it retracted, allowing ground transportation on a trailer.

The boat is normally fitted with a small 3 to 6 hp (2 to 4 kW) outboard motor for docking and maneuvering.

The design has sleeping accommodation for four people, with a double "V"-berth in the bow cabin, and two straight settees in the main cabin that can be converted into a full-wideth double berth. The galley is located on the port side just aft of the companionway ladder. The galley is equipped with a single-burner stove and a sink. The head is located in the bow cabin under the "V"-berth. Cabin headroom is 55 in (140 cm).

The wing keel version has a PHRF racing average handicap of 237 with a high of 258 and low of 226. The centerboard version has a PHRF racing average handicap of 237 with a high of 219 and low of 276. It has a hull speed of 5.93 kn (10.98 km/h).

== Operational history ==
In a 2010 review Steve Henkel wrote, "Best features: Although the V-berth forward is only large enough for two children or one adult, owners may feel compensated by having the ability to convert the entire main cabin into a double bed (the full 8-foot width of the hull), by utilizing floorboards as supports and seatbacks as cushions. Worst features: Owners have reported leaking around the keel bolts and around the rudder gudgeons. Another source of annoyance has been the boat's tendency to sit down in the water by the port quarter, a result of putting batteries, water tank, and the transom-mounted outboard engine all in the aft quarter to port."

== See also ==
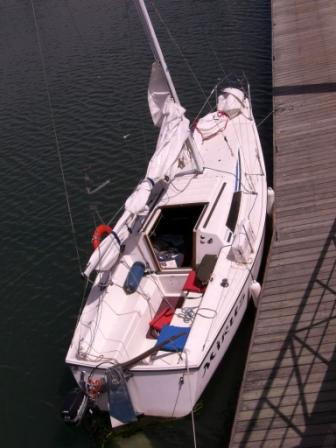
Hunter 23

- List of sailing boat types
