= C&C 50 =

Sailboat class

Development
- Designer: C&C Design
- Location: Canada
- Year: 1972
- Builder: C&C Yachts
- Name: C&C 50

Boat
- Displacement: 31,100 lb (14,107 kg)
- Draft: 8.00 ft (2.44 m)

Hull
- Type: Monohull
- Construction: Fibreglass
- LOA: 49.83 ft (15.19 m)
- LWL: 39.00 ft (11.89 m)
- Beam: 14.50 ft (4.42 m)
- Engine: Westerbeke 4-107 35 hp (26 kW) diesel engine

Hull appendages
- Keel: fin keel
- Ballast: 15,000 lb (6,804 kg)
- Rudder: transom-mounted rudder

Rig
- Rig type: Bermuda rig
- I foretriangle height: 64.00 ft (19.51 m)
- J foretriangle base: 23.75 ft (7.24 m)
- P mainsail luff: 57.00 ft (17.37 m)
- E mainsail foot: 18.00 ft (5.49 m)

Sails
- Sailplan: Masthead sloop
- Mainsail area: 513.00 sq ft (47.659 m^{2})
- Jib/genoa area: 760.00 sq ft (70.606 m^{2})
- Total sail area: 1,273.00 sq ft (118.266 m^{2})

Racing
- PHRF: 51 (average)

The C&C 50 is a Canadian sailboat, that was designed by C&C Design and first built in 1972.

== Production ==
The design was built by C&C Yachts in Canada between 1972 and 1975, but it is now out of production.

== Design ==
The C&C 50 is a small recreational keelboat, built predominantly of fibreglass, with wood trim. It has a masthead sloop rig, an internally-mounted spade-type rudder and a fixed fin keel. It displaces 31,100 lb (14,107 kg) and carries 15,000 lb (6,804 kg) of ballast.

The boat has a draft of 8.00 ft (2.44 m) with the standard keel fitted. The boat is fitted with a Westerbeke 4-107 diesel engine of 35 hp (26 kW).

The design has a PHRF racing average handicap of 51 with a high of 33 and low of 72. It has a hull speed of 8.37 kn (15.50 km/h).

== See also ==
- List of sailing boat types

Similar sailboats

- Hunter 49
- Hunter HC 50
- Marlow-Hunter 47
- Marlow-Hunter 50
- Marlow-Hunter 50 Center Cockpit
