= Hunter 26.5 =

Sailboat class

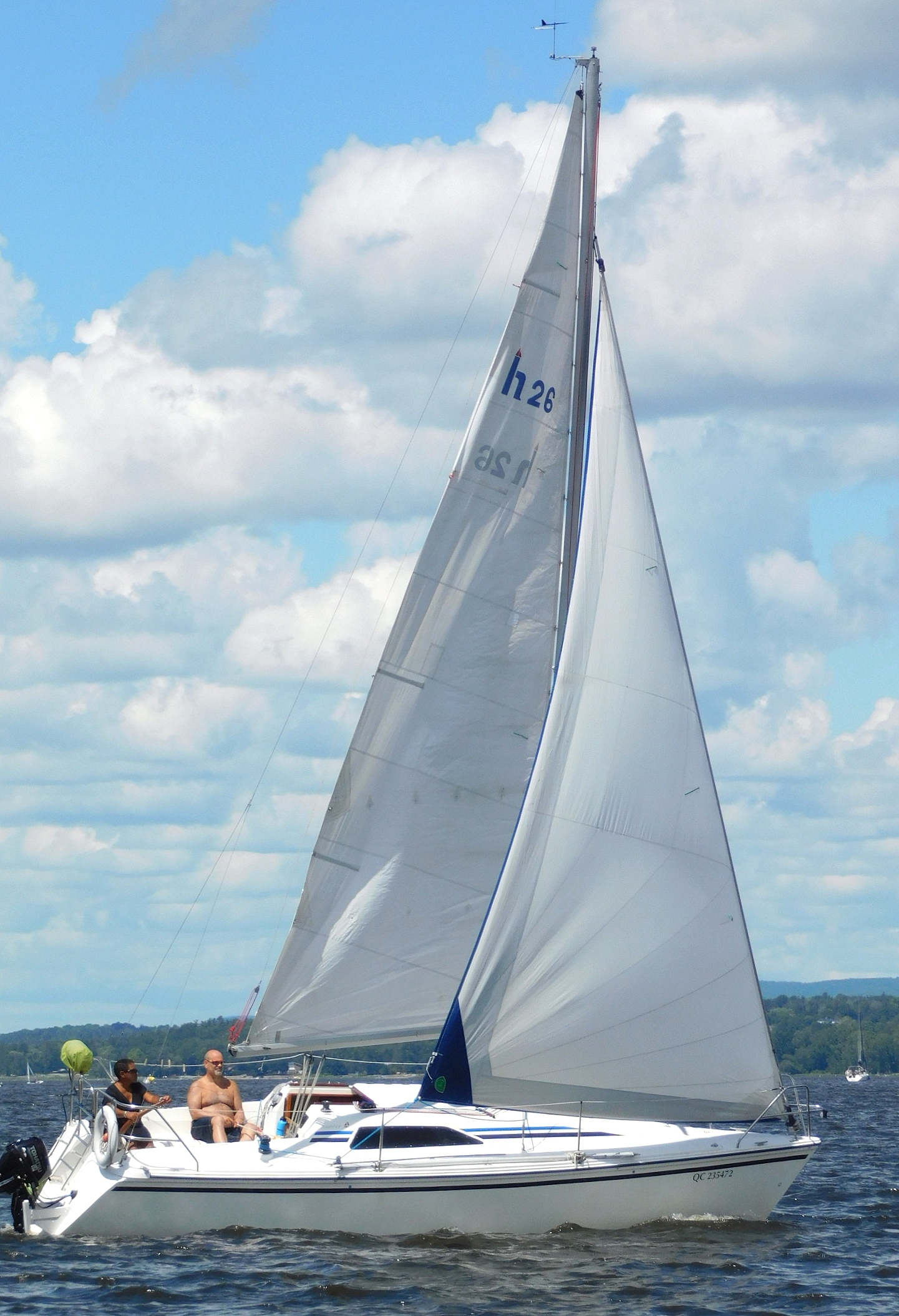

Development
- Designer: Hunter Design Team
- Location: United States
- Year: 1985
- Builder: Hunter Marine
- Name: Hunter 26.5

Boat
- Displacement: 4,400 lb (1,996 kg)
- Draft: 3.50 ft (1.07 m)

Hull
- Type: Monohull
- Construction: Fiberglass
- LOA: 26.58 ft (8.10 m)
- LWL: 22.42 ft (6.83 m)
- Beam: 9.00 ft (2.74 m)
- Engine: Outboard motor

Hull appendages
- Keel: wing keel
- Ballast: 1,800 lb (816 kg)
- Rudder: internally-mounted spade-type rudder

Rig
- Rig type: Bermuda rig
- I foretriangle height: 29.42 ft (8.97 m)
- J foretriangle base: 9.42 ft (2.87 m)
- P mainsail luff: 30.50 ft (9.30 m)
- E mainsail foot: 10.83 ft (3.30 m)

Sails
- Sailplan: Fractional rigged sloop
- Mainsail area: 165.16 sq ft (15.344 m^{2})
- Jib/genoa area: 138.57 sq ft (12.874 m^{2})
- Total sail area: 303.73 sq ft (28.217 m^{2})

Racing
- PHRF: 189 (average)

The Hunter 26.5 is an American sailboat that was designed by the Hunter Design Team and first built in 1985.

== Production ==
The design was built by Hunter Marine in the United States between 1985 and 1987, but it is now out of production.

== Design ==
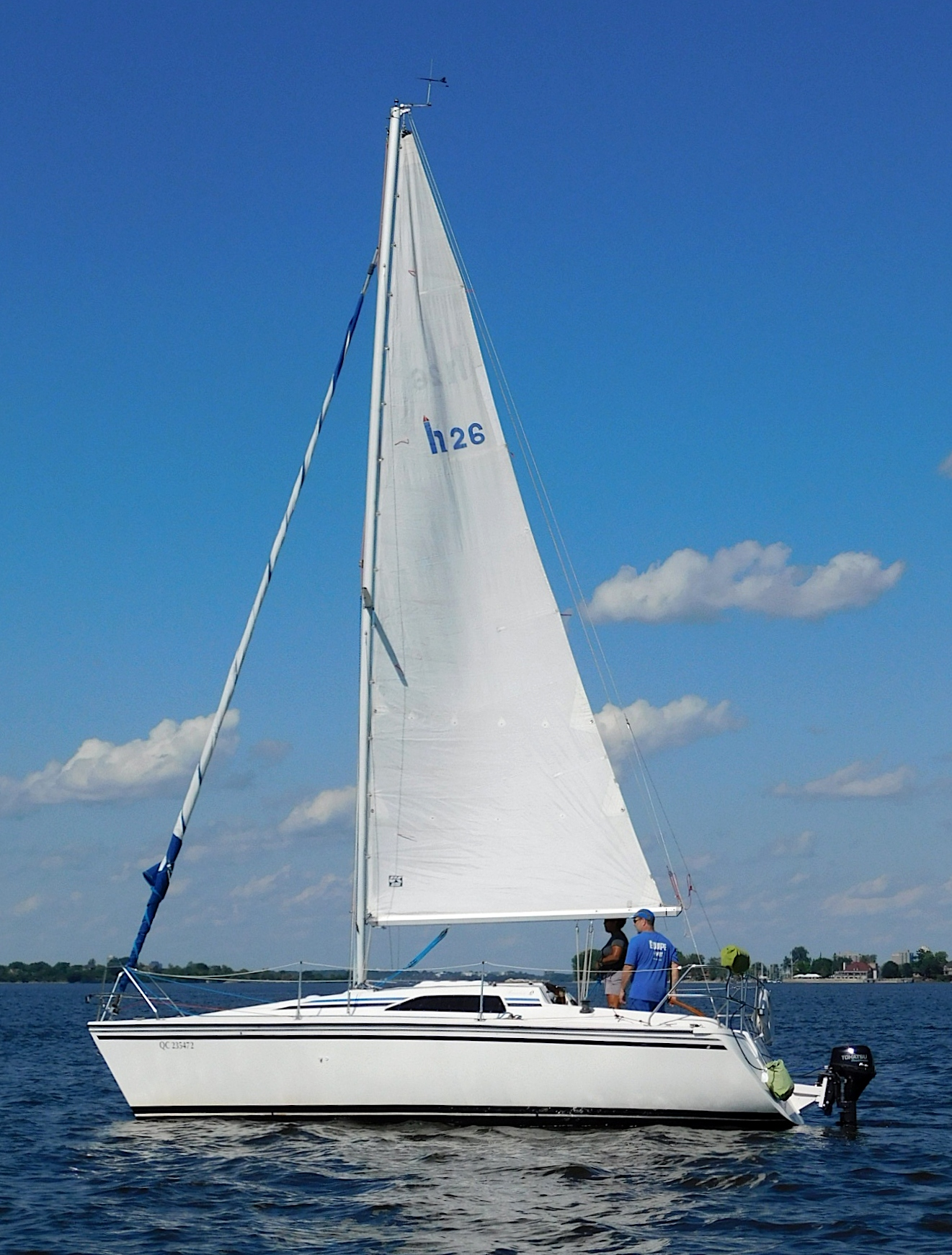
Hunter 26.5

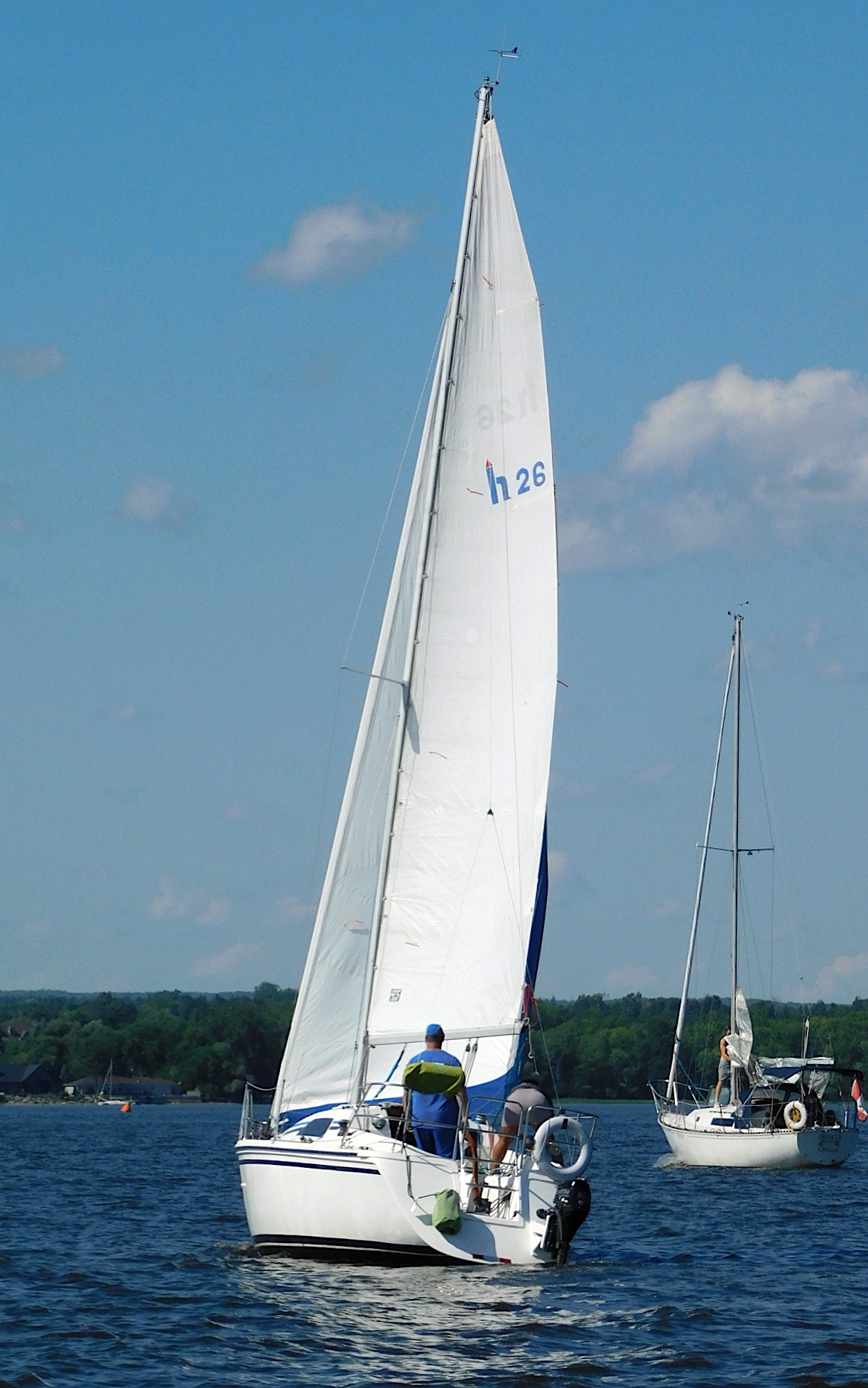
Hunter 26.5

The Hunter 26.5 is a recreational keelboat, built predominantly of fiberglass. It has a fractional sloop rig, an aluminum mast and boom, a raked stem, a walk-through reverse transom, an internally-mounted spade-type rudder controlled by a laminated wooden tiller and a fixed wing keel. It displaces 4,400 lb (1,996 kg) and carries 1,800 lb (816 kg) of ballast. The fresh water tank has a capacity of 23 U.S. gallons (87 L; 19 imp gal).

The boat has a draft of 3.50 ft (1.07 m) with the standard wing keel and 4.25 ft (1.30 m) with the optional deep draft keel.

The boat is normally fitted with a small outboard motor for docking and maneuvering. A 9.9 hp (7 kW) outboard was factory standard equipment.

The boat was delivered with many items as standard equipment, as part of the manufacturer's Cruise Pac. These included a 110% genoa foresail, mast head wind indicator, stainless steel front and rear pulpits, lifelines and stanchions, a stainless steel re-boarding ladder, holly and teak wood interior, dinette table, portable toilet, a stainless steel galley sink, stove, ice chest, an outboard motor bracket, anchor and anchor line and even life jackets.

The design has a PHRF racing average handicap of 189 with a high of 198 and low of 186. It has a hull speed of 6.34 kn (11.74 km/h).

== See also ==
- List of sailing boat types
