= Hunter 30T =

Sailboat class

Development
- Location: United States
- Year: 1991
- Builder: Hunter Marine
- Name: Hunter 30T

Boat
- Displacement: 10,500 lb (4,763 kg)
- Draft: 4.25 ft (1.30 m)

Hull
- Type: Monohull
- Construction: Fiberglass
- LOA: 30.08 ft (9.17 m)
- LWL: 26.33 ft (8.03 m)
- Beam: 11.00 ft (3.35 m)
- Engine: 18 hp (13 kW) diesel engine

Hull appendages
- Keel: wing keel
- Ballast: 3,800 lb (1,724 kg)
- Rudder: internally mounted spade-type rudder

Rig
- Rig type: Bermuda rig
- I foretriangle height: 37.00 ft (11.28 m)
- J foretriangle base: 9.75 ft (2.97 m)
- P mainsail luff: 40.58 ft (12.37 m)
- E mainsail foot: 12.50 ft (3.81 m)

Sails
- Sailplan: Fractional rigged sloop
- Mainsail area: 253.63 sq ft (23.563 m^{2})
- Jib/genoa area: 180.38 sq ft (16.758 m^{2})
- Total sail area: 434.00 sq ft (40.320 m^{2})

The Hunter 30T is an American sailboat that was first built in 1991.

The Hunter 30T is a development of the 1988 Hunter 30-2 design.

The design was originally marketed by the manufacturer as the Hunter 30, but is now usually referred to as the Hunter 30T to differentiate it from the unrelated 1973 Hunter 30 design and the 30-2, which was also marketed as the Hunter 30.

== Production ==
The design was built by Hunter Marine in the United States between 1991 and 1994, but it is now out of production.

== Design ==
The Hunter 30T is a recreational keelboat, built predominantly of fiberglass. It has a fractional sloop rig, a raked stem, a walk-through reverse transom with a swim platform, an internally mounted spade-type rudder controlled by a wheel and a fixed wing keel. It displaces 10,500 lb (4,763 kg) and carries 3,800 lb (1,724 kg) of ballast.

The design features a T-shaped cockpit, 110% genoa, double line lines, a teak and holly cabin sole, seven opening ports and five opening hatches, a dinette table a fully enclosed head with a shower, vanity and mirror, sleeping accommodation for seven people, a two-burner stove and double stainless steel sinks, an icebox. An anchor and lifejackets were included as standard equipment.

The boat has a draft of 4.25 ft (1.30 m) with the standard wing keel. The boat is fitted with an inboard diesel engine of 18 hp (13 kW). The fuel tank holds 18 U.S. gallons (68 L; 15 imp gal) and the fresh water tank has a capacity of 37 U.S. gallons (140 L; 31 imp gal).

The design has a hull speed of 6.88 kn (12.74 km/h).

== See also ==
- List of sailing boat types
