= Hunter Xcite =

Sailboat class

Development
- Designer: Hunter Design Team
- Location: United States
- Year: 2003
- Builder: Hunter Marine
- Name: Hunter Xcite

Boat
- Displacement: 95 lb (43 kg)
- Draft: 3.18 ft (0.97 m)

Hull
- Type: Monohull
- Construction: ACP
- LOA: 9.91 ft (3.02 m)
- Beam: 4.43 ft (1.35 m)

Hull appendages
- Keel: centerboard
- Ballast: none
- Rudder: transom-mounted rudder

Rig
- Rig type: Unstayed catboat

Sails
- Sailplan: Cat rig
- Mainsail area: 46 sq ft (4.3 m^{2})
- Total sail area: 46 sq ft (4.3 m^{2})

The Hunter Xcite (English: Excite), also called the Hunter Xcite 10, is an American sailing dinghy that was designed by the Hunter Design Team and first built in 2003.

== Production ==
The design was built by Hunter Marine in the United States, but it is now out of production.

== Design ==
The Hunter Xcite is an unsinkable recreational sailboat, built from a sandwich panel of thermoformed UV-protected plastic, with fiberglass mat and injected foam. It has a free-standing catboat rig, a raked stem, an open self-draining reverse transom, a transom-hung rudder controlled by a tiller and tiller extension and a folding centerboard. It displaces 95 lb (43 kg) and can be transported on an automobile roof rack.

The boat has a draft of 3.19 ft (0.97 m) with the centerboard extended and 0.49 ft (0.15 m) with it retracted, allowing beaching or ground transportation on a trailer. The boat has no provisions for an outboard motor.

Factory standard equipment included a two-piece anodized aluminum mast and boom. A "training sail" of 34 sq ft (3.2 m^{2}) was available. Factory options included a launching dolly and a larger 55 sq ft (5.1 m^{2}) "turbo" mainsail.

== See also ==
- List of sailing boat types

Similar sailboats

- Laser (dinghy)
- Laser Pico
