= Hunter HC 50 =

Offshore recreational keelboat

Development
- Designer: Hunter Design Team
- Location: United States
- Year: 2000
- Builder: Hunter Marine
- Name: Hunter HC 50

Boat
- Displacement: 18,000 lb (8,165 kg)
- Draft: 5.83 ft (1.78 m)

Hull
- Type: Monohull
- Construction: Fiberglass
- LOA: 50.00 ft (15.24 m)
- LWL: 45.00 ft (13.72 m)
- Beam: 15.00 ft (4.57 m)
- Engine: Yanmar 38 hp (28 kW) diesel engine

Hull appendages
- Keel: fin keel
- Ballast: 5,600 lb (2,540 kg) in a lead keel, plus two 2,700 lb (1,225 kg) water ballast tanks
- Rudder: internally-mounted spade-type rudder

Rig
- Rig type: Bermuda rig
- I foretriangle height: 58.33 ft (17.78 m)
- J foretriangle base: 16.50 ft (5.03 m)
- P mainsail luff: 50.00 ft (15.24 m)
- E mainsail foot: 21.25 ft (6.48 m)

Sails
- Sailplan: Cutter rig
- Mainsail area: 531.50 sq ft (49.378 m^{2})
- Jib/genoa area: 481.22 sq ft (44.707 m^{2})
- Total sail area: 1,274 sq ft (118.4 m^{2})

The Hunter HC 50 is an American sailboat that was designed by the Hunter Design Team as a "long distance express cruiser" and first built in 2000.

The HC 50 is a development of the one-off racers Hunter's Child and Route 66, with a design goal of producing a fast cruising sailboat. The HC designation is an acknowledgment of its design ancestry.

The design designation can be confused with the Hunter 50 CC of 2009 and the Hunter 50 AC of 2010.

== Production ==
The design was built by Hunter Marine in the United States starting in 2000, but it is now out of production.

== Design ==
The Hunter HC 50 is a recreational keelboat, built predominantly of vacuum bag moulded fiberglass, with a foam-core deck. It has a cutter rig, a raked stem, a walk-through open reverse transom with a swimming platform and folding ladder, an internally mounted spade-type rudder controlled by a tiller and a fixed fin keel. It displaces 16,000 lb (7,257 kg) and carries 5,600 lb (2,540 kg) of lead ballast in the keel and also 2,700 lb (1,225 kg) of flooding water ballast in each of two lateral tanks, filled with electric pumps. The design has 6.5 ft (2.0 m) stand-up headroom below decks.

The boat has a draft of 5.83 ft (1.78 m) with the standard keel fitted.

The boat is fitted with a Japanese Yanmar diesel engine of 38 hp (28 kW) or optionally of 47 hp (35 kW), both with 90 degree sail drives and folding propellers. The fuel tank holds 150 U.S. gallons (570 L; 120 imp gal) and the fresh water tank has a capacity of 50 U.S. gallons (190 L; 42 imp gal).

Factory standard equipment included a fully battened mainsail, 95% roller furling jib on the inner forestay, hank-on light-wind headsail, gear for an asymmetrical spinnaker, aluminum mast tripod support, mainsheet traveler mounted on a stainless steel arch, eight opening deck hatches, four two-speed self tailing winches, 27 in (69 cm) stanchions mounting triple lifelines, anodized spars, fixed bowsprit with an anchor roller and electric windlass, stern "picnic" anchor locker, hot and cold water transom shower, a gimbaled nav station, fully enclosed head with shower, private forward and dual aft cabins, a dinette table, dual sinks, two-burner gimbaled liquid petroleum gas stove and oven, refrigerator and freezer, a water-maker, a fog bell and six life jackets. Factory options included a carbon fiber mast, wheel steering, a knotmeter, GPS, radar, autopilot, depth sounder, air conditioning, electric halyard winch and a bimini top.

The design has a hull speed of 8.99 kn (16.65 km/h).
