= Hunter 30 =

Sailboat class

Development
- Designer: John Cherubini
- Location: United States
- Year: 1973
- No. built: 1,000
- Builder: Hunter Marine
- Name: Hunter 30

Boat
- Displacement: 9,700 lb (4,400 kg)
- Draft: 5.25 ft (1.60 m)

Hull
- Type: Monohull
- Construction: Fiberglass
- LOA: 30.40 ft (9.27 m)
- LWL: 25.75 ft (7.85 m)
- Beam: 10.17 ft (3.10 m)
- Engine: Yanmar diesel engine

Hull appendages
- Keel: fin keel
- Ballast: 4,100 lb (1,860 kg)
- Rudder: skeg-mounted spade-type rudder

Rig
- Rig type: Bermuda rig
- I foretriangle height: 40.00 ft (12.19 m)
- J foretriangle base: 12.83 ft (3.91 m)
- P mainsail luff: 34.20 ft (10.42 m)
- E mainsail foot: 11.50 ft (3.51 m)

Sails
- Sailplan: Masthead sloop
- Mainsail area: 196.65 sq ft (18.269 m^{2})
- Jib/genoa area: 256.60 sq ft (23.839 m^{2})
- Total sail area: 453.25 sq ft (42.108 m^{2})

The Hunter 30 is an American sailboat that was designed by John Cherubini as a cruising boat and first built in 1973.

The boat was also supplied as an unfinished kit for amateur completion as the Quest 30.

The Hunter 30 was the first design marketed by the manufacturer under that name. Later boats with the same name are commonly referred to as the Hunter 30-2 and Hunter 30T to differentiate them from the earlier unrelated design. Adding to the confusion, the 2006 Hunter 31-2 was also marketed as the Hunter 30.

== Production ==
The design was built by Hunter Marine in the United States between 1973 and 1983, but it is now out of production. During its ten-year production run 1,000 examples were completed.

== Design ==
The Hunter 30 is a recreational keelboat, built predominantly of fiberglass, with wood trim. It has a masthead sloop rig, a raked stem, a reverse transom, a skeg-mounted rudder controlled by a wheel and a fixed fin keel, shoal-draft keel, or a keel and centerboard combination. It displaces 9,700 lb (4,400 kg) and carries 4,100 lb (1,860 kg) of ballast.

The boat has a draft of 5.25 ft (1.60 m) with the standard keel and 4.3 ft (1.3 m) with the optional shoal draft keel. A tall mast version was produced for lighter wind areas, with a mast about 2.8 ft (0.85 m) higher. The boat was factory-fitted with a Japanese Yanmar diesel engine.

The design features a galley with a two-burner stove, sink, hot and cold water, a head with a stand-up shower, vanity and sink, nine port lights with bug screens, double life lines and a teak and holly cabin sole.

The centerboard version of the design has a PHRF racing average handicap of 186, while the shoal draft version of the design has a PHRF racing average handicap of 192. The tall mast version of the design has a PHRF racing average handicap of 180 and the tall mast version with the shoal draft keel has a PHRF racing average handicap of 192. All versions have a hull speed of 6.8 kn (12.59 km/h).

== See also ==
- List of sailing boat types
