= Hunter 54 =

Sailboat class

Development
- Designer: W. Luhrs; J. Cherubini; C. Steck
- Location: United States
- Year: 1980
- Builder: Hunter Marine
- Name: Hunter 54

Boat
- Displacement: 20,500 lb (9,299 kg)
- Draft: 6.00 ft (1.83 m)

Hull
- Type: Monohull
- Construction: Fiberglass
- LOA: 54.83 ft (16.71 m)
- LWL: 43.50 ft (13.26 m)
- Beam: 11.33 ft (3.45 m)
- Engine: 48 hp (36 kW) diesel engine

Hull appendages
- Keel: fin keel
- Ballast: 8,200 lb (3,719 kg)
- Rudder: internally-mounted spade-type rudder

Rig
- Rig type: Bermuda rig
- I foretriangle height: 54.60 ft (16.64 m)
- J foretriangle base: 20.00 ft (6.10 m)
- P mainsail luff: 48.80 ft (14.87 m)
- E mainsail foot: 14.80 ft (4.51 m)

Sails
- Sailplan: Cutter rig
- Mainsail area: 361.12 sq ft (33.549 m^{2})
- Jib/genoa area: 546.00 sq ft (50.725 m^{2})
- Total sail area: 907.12 sq ft (84.274 m^{2})

Racing
- PHRF: 54 (average)

The Hunter 54 is an American sailboat that was designed by Warren Luhrs, John Cherubini and Cortland Steck as a cruiser and first built in 1980. The design was based upon three years of off-shore racing experience.

== Production ==
The design was built by Hunter Marine in the United States between 1980 and 1983, but it is now out of production.

== Design ==
The Hunter 54 is a recreational keelboat, built predominantly of fiberglass, with wood trim. The hull was designed by Warren Luhrs and John Cherubini, while Cortland Steck designed the rig. It has a cutter rig, a raked stem, a walk-through reverse transom with a swimming platform, folding ladder and dinghy stowage in a watertight compartment, an internally mounted spade-type rudder controlled by a wheel and a fixed fin keel. It displaces 20,500 lb (9,299 kg) and carries 8,200 lb (3,719 kg) of ballast.

The boat has a draft of 6.00 ft (1.83 m) with the standard keel fitted.

The boat is fitted with a diesel engine of 48 hp (36 kW). The fuel tank holds 78 U.S. gallons (300 L; 65 imp gal) and the fresh water tank has a capacity of 132 U.S. gallons (500 L; 110 imp gal).

Factory standard equipment included a cockpit-mounted, six-man, life-raft; 120% staysail; anchor and built-in anchor roller; integral solar panel; teak and holly cabin sole; two fully enclosed heads with showers; private forward and aft cabins; a dinette table; refrigerator; dual sinks; gimbaled stove and oven; 8 ft (2.44 m) fiberglass dinghy, with oars and life jackets.

The design has a PHRF racing average handicap of 54 with a high of 42 and low of 66. It has a hull speed of 8.84 kn (16.37 km/h).

== See also ==
- List of sailing boat types
