= Hunter Marine =

Sailboat manufacturer

Marlow-Hunter LLC
- Type: Limited liability company
- Industry: Boat building
- Founded: 1973
- Founder: Warren Luhrs
- Headquarters: Alachua, Florida, United States
- Products: Sailboats
- Website: www.marlow-hunter.com

Hunter Marine was an American boat builder The company did produce the Mainship powerboat brand. The company was based in Alachua, Florida, and is now closed.

The first boat design was a 25-foot (7.6 meter) long sloop, and another noted design was the Ocean racing sailboat the HC 50.

== History ==
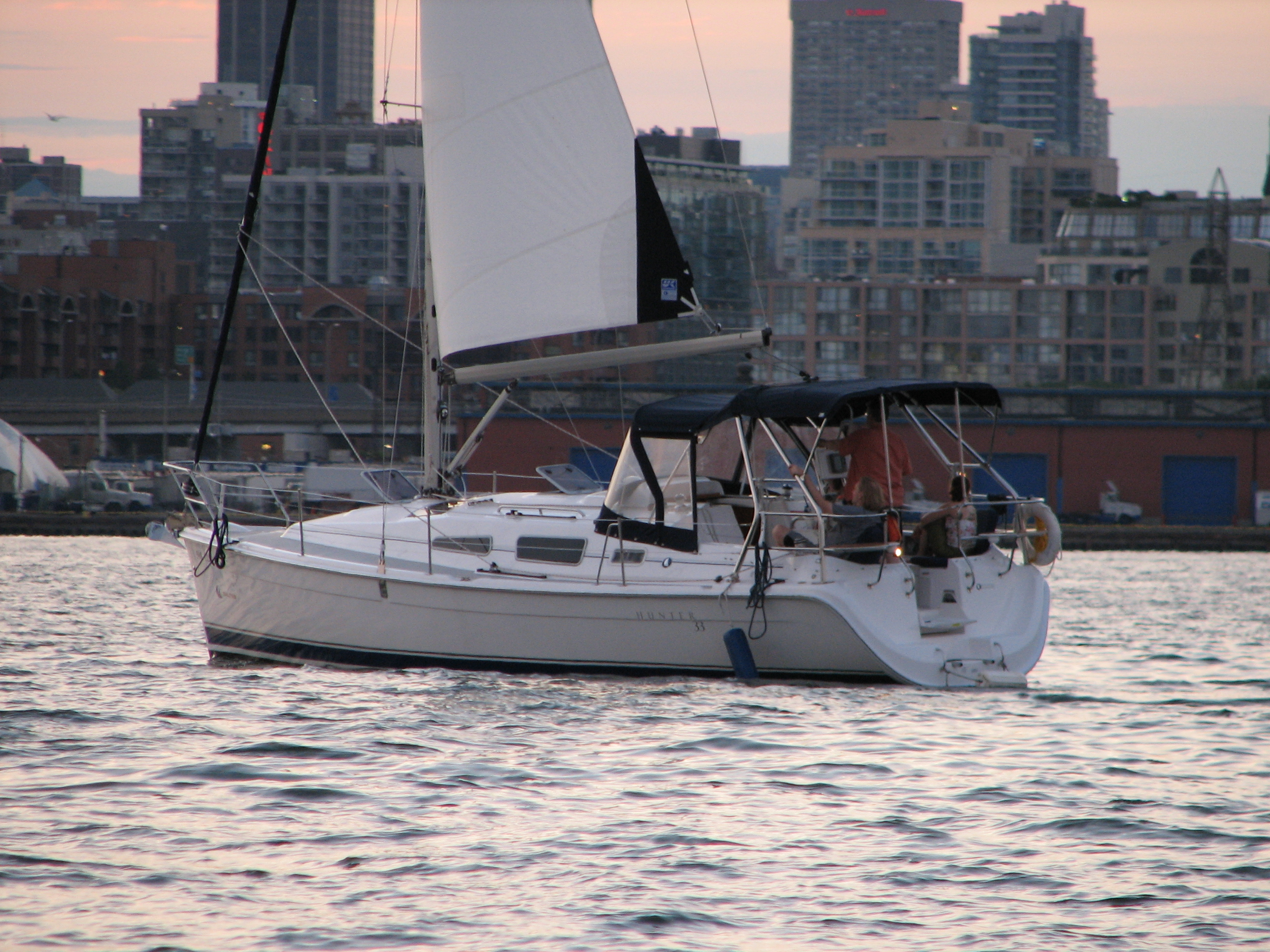
Hunter 33-2004

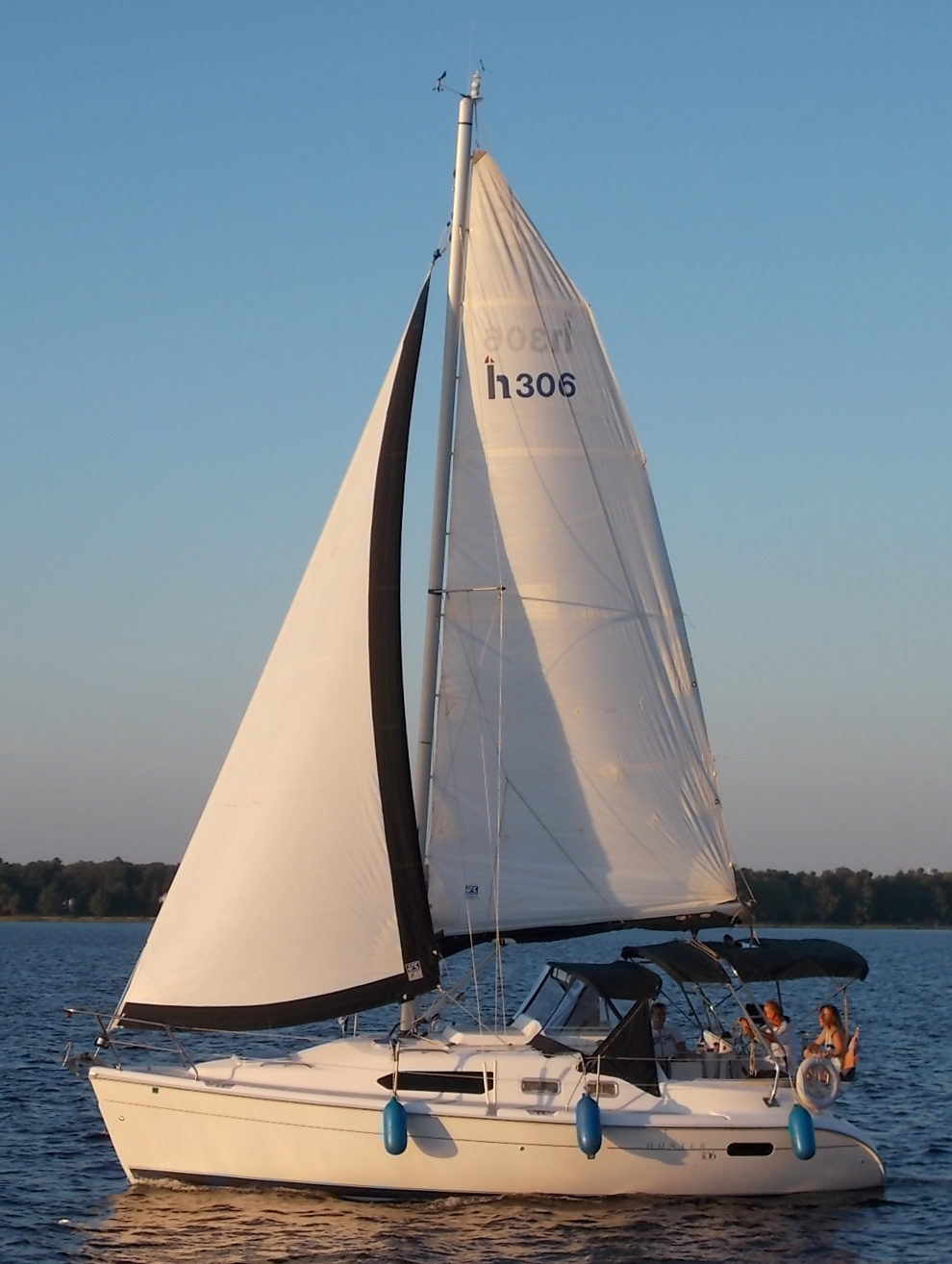
Hunter 306

In the 1800s Henry Luhrs, a German immigrant, outfitted trading ships and owned a chandlery. His grandson, Henry, continued the family heritage on the New Jersey coast, building and repairing recreational and fishing boats. By the early 1960s Henry and his sons, John and Warren, were building over a thousand powerboats a year. Hunter was started in 1973 in Alachua, Florida, as a sailboat manufacturer. The early Hunter boats were designed by John E. Cherubini.

In 1988 the company ran into trouble, as the founder, Luhrs, engaged in protected ocean racing and left the company in the hands of management. The result was production of low-quality boats backed by a short warranty and poor customer service, leading to trouble with dealers and unhappy owners. Luhrs was forced to suspend his racing career and return to directly run the company, carrying out a restructuring, creating new work teams, extending the warranty from one year to five years and hiring Canadian designer Rob Mazza in 1991 to take over design and coordinate the production process. Mazza designed the Hunter 29.5 and its larger follow-up, the 336.

Hunter then utilized the design service of Glenn Henderson and its in-house team until 2010. Hunter is responsible for several market innovations, including their distinctive stainless steel cockpit arch and their use of the B&R rig. Hunter also began the construction of sailboats whose hulls make use of bow hollow and stern reflex, marine architecture design elements that maximize thrust under sail.

In 2012 Hunter Marine entered Chapter 11 bankruptcy. The company was sold in August 2012 to David E. Marlow, owner of Marlow Yachts and the name changed to Marlow-Hunter, LLC.

Examples of models made by Marlow-Hunter in the 2010s include the Marlow-Hunter 31, 33, 37 and 40 models. The new 31-foot was developed under Marlow-Hunter under guidance from longtime Hunter marine consultant and naval architect Glenn Henderson. The 31 has increased interior space compared to older models, and is actually wider (increased beam) than the 33 foot long boat in the range.

== Boats ==
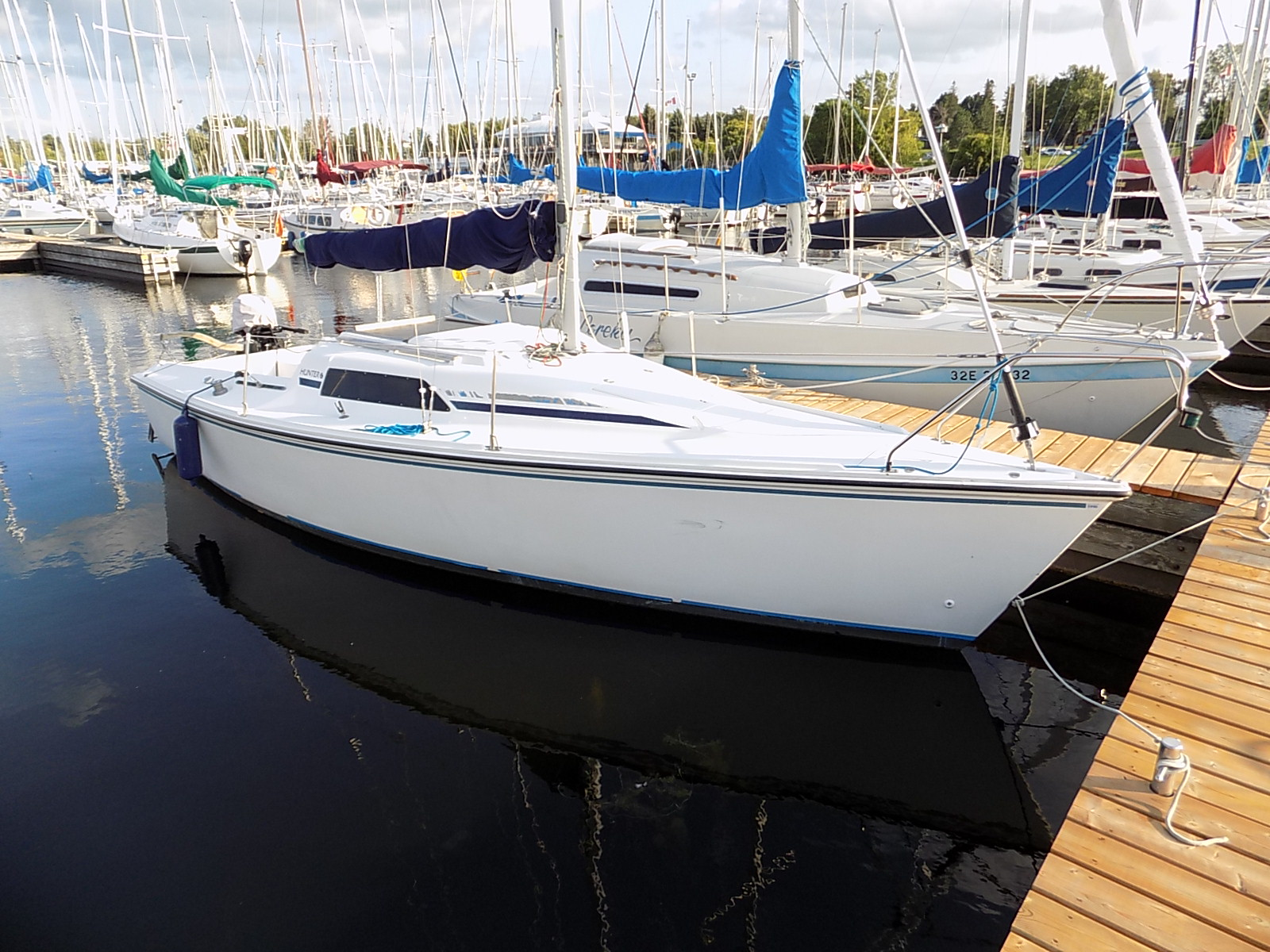
Hunter 23

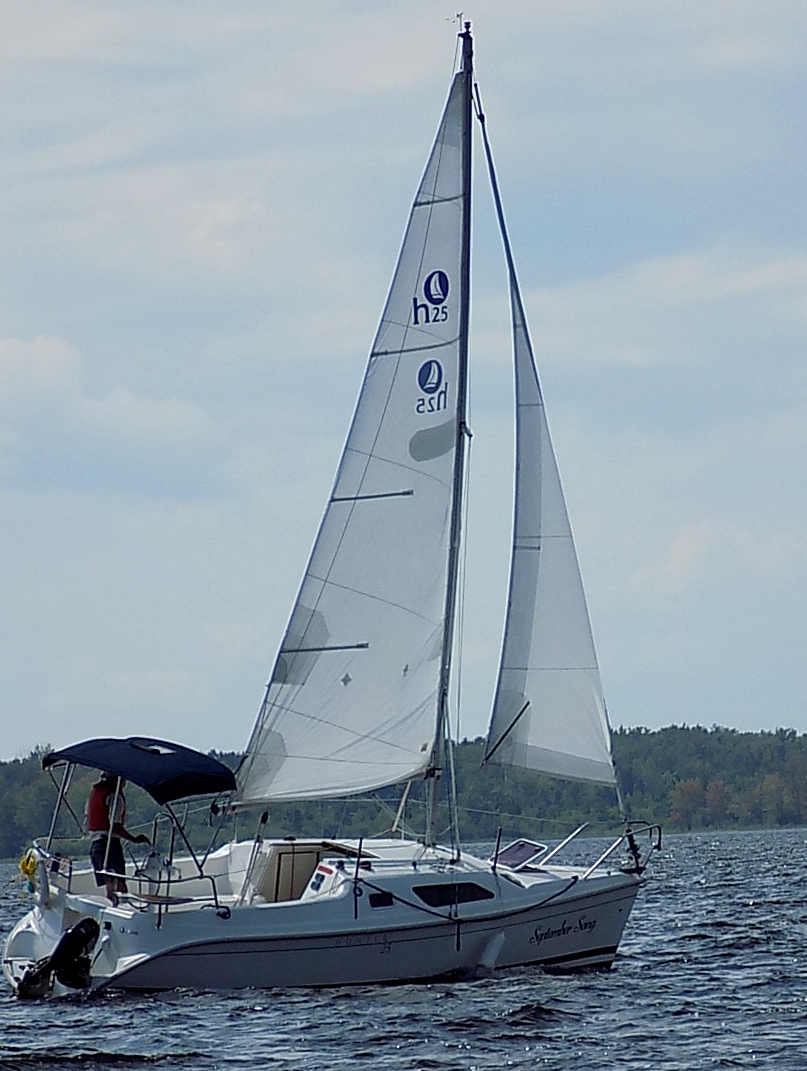
Hunter 25-2

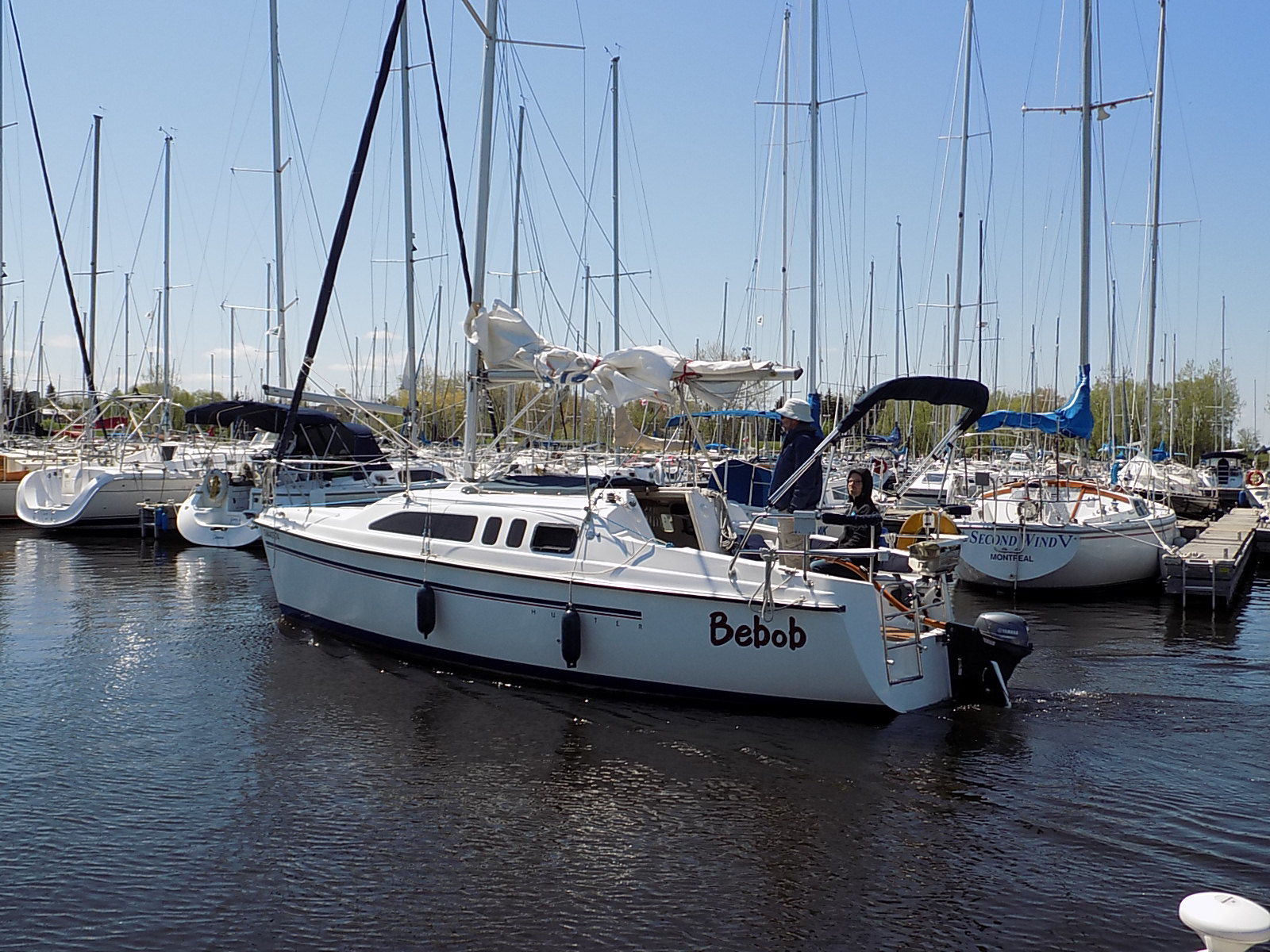
Hunter 26

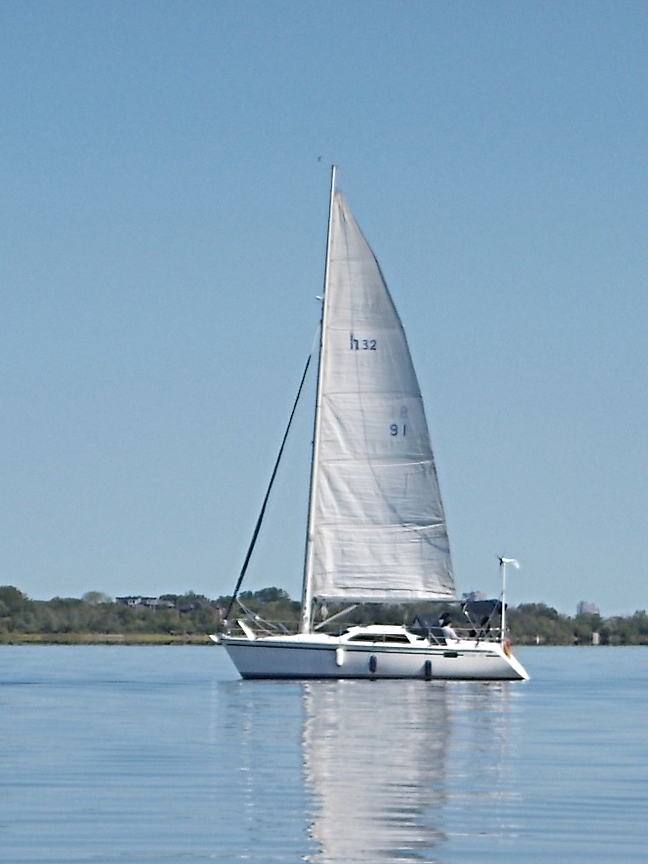
Hunter 32

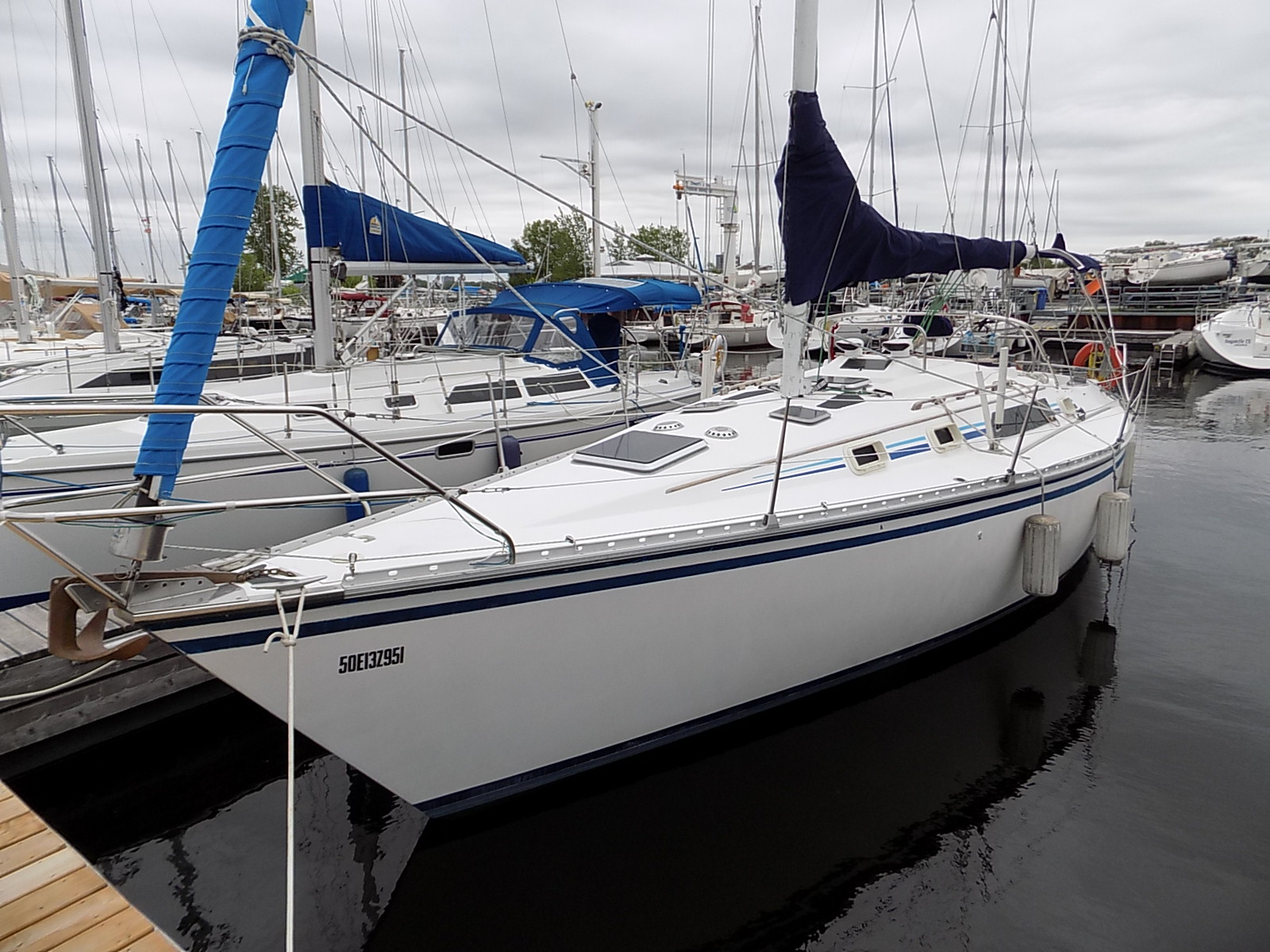
Hunter 34

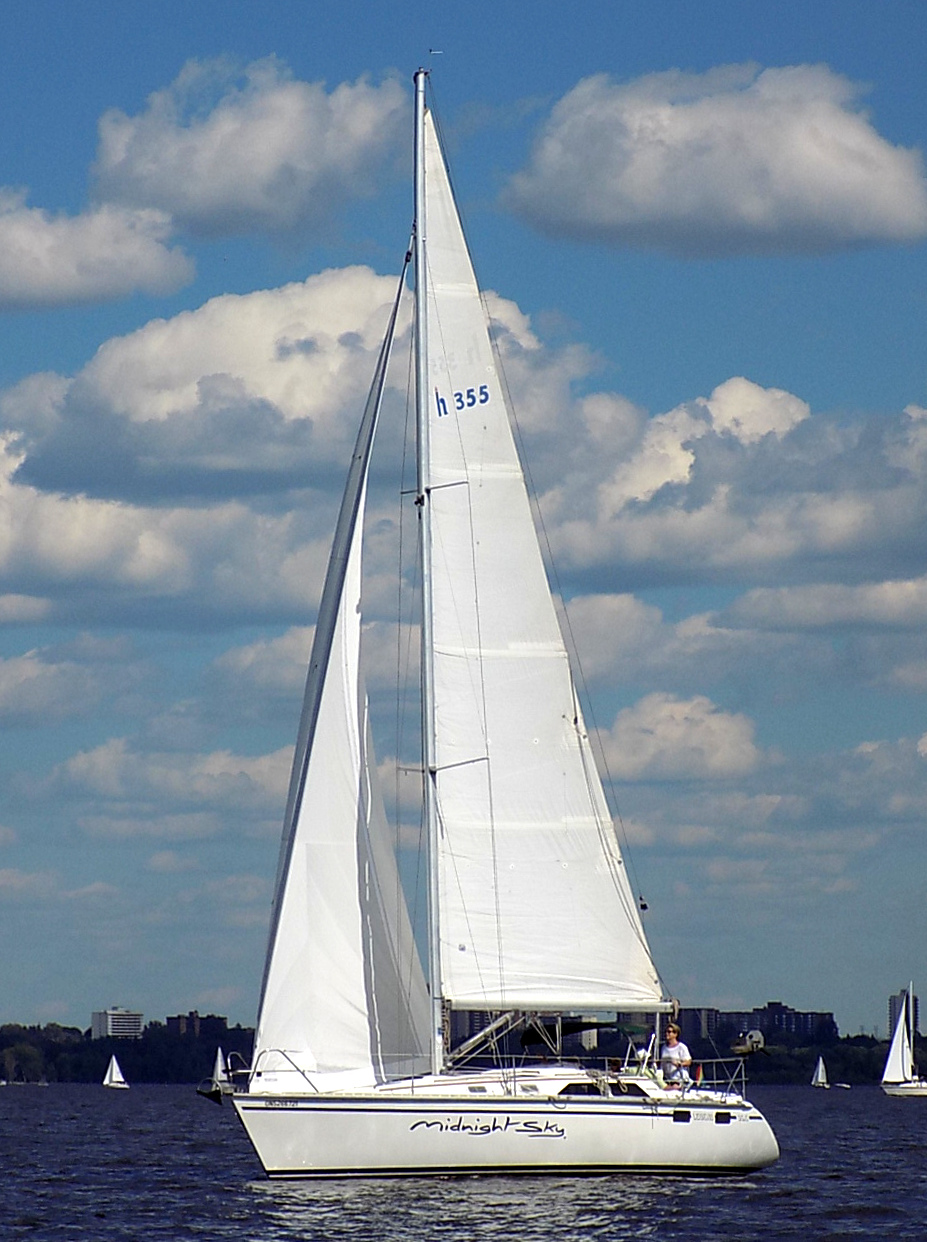
Hunter 35.5 Legend

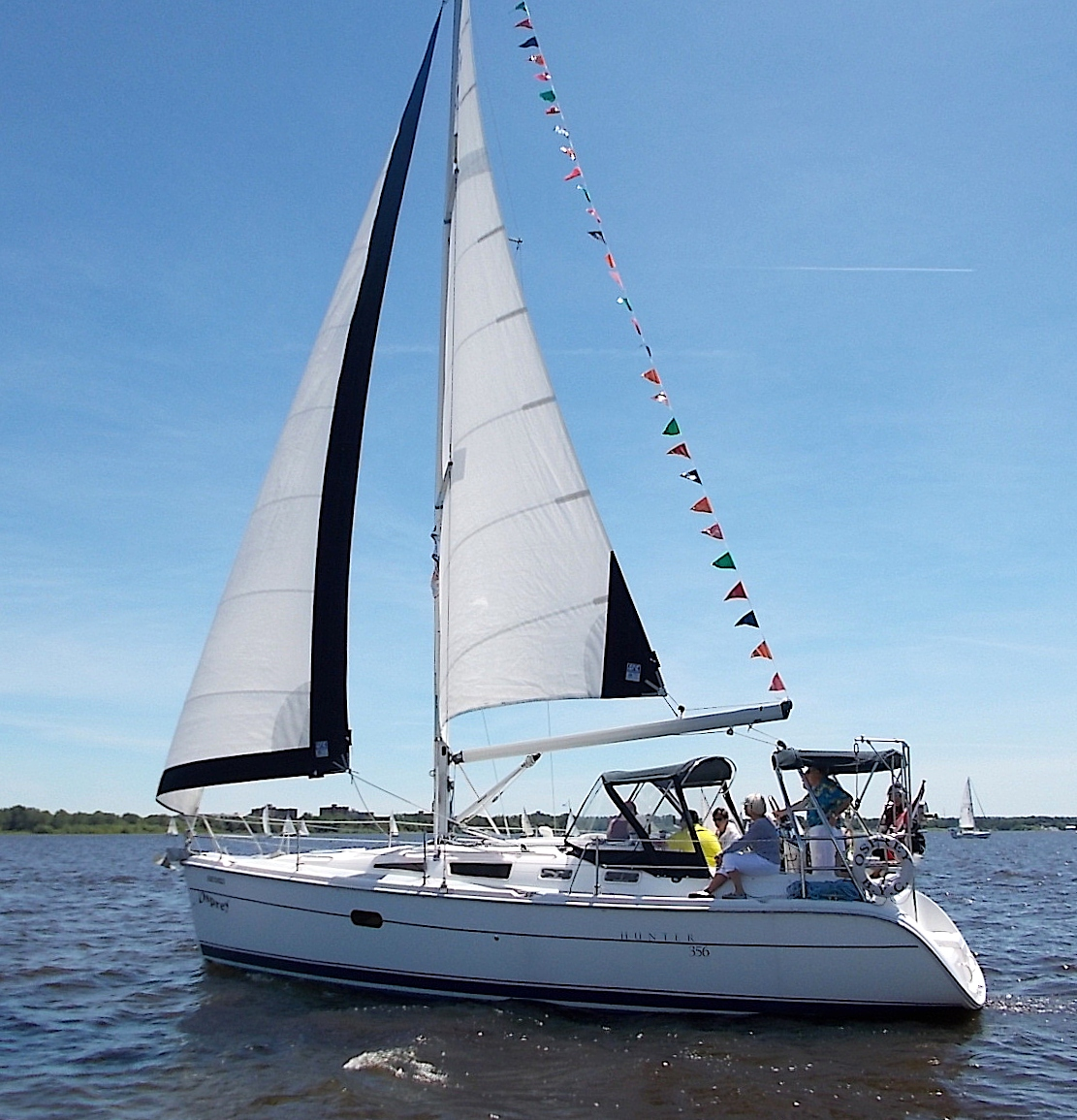
Hunter 356

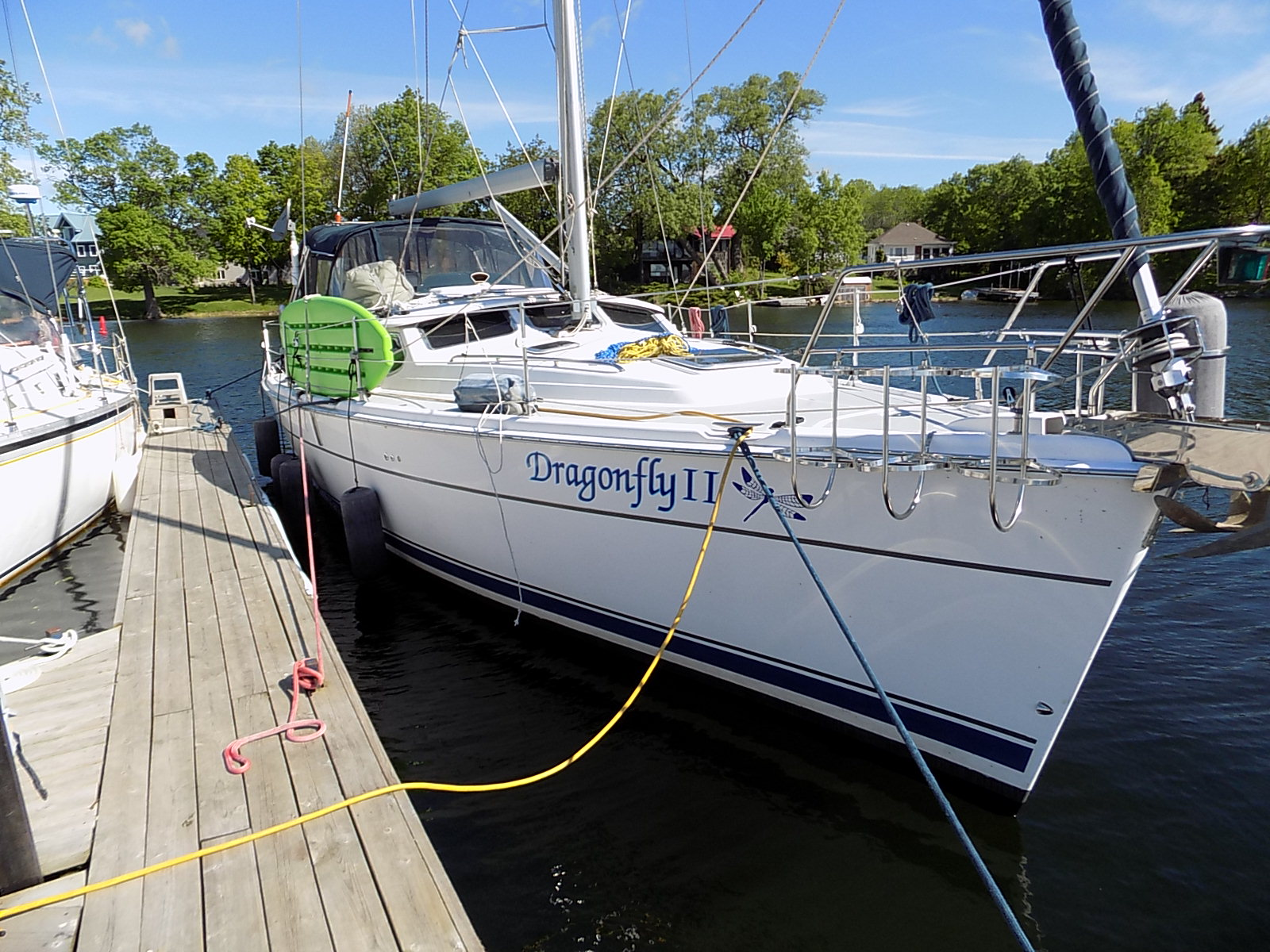
Hunter 44

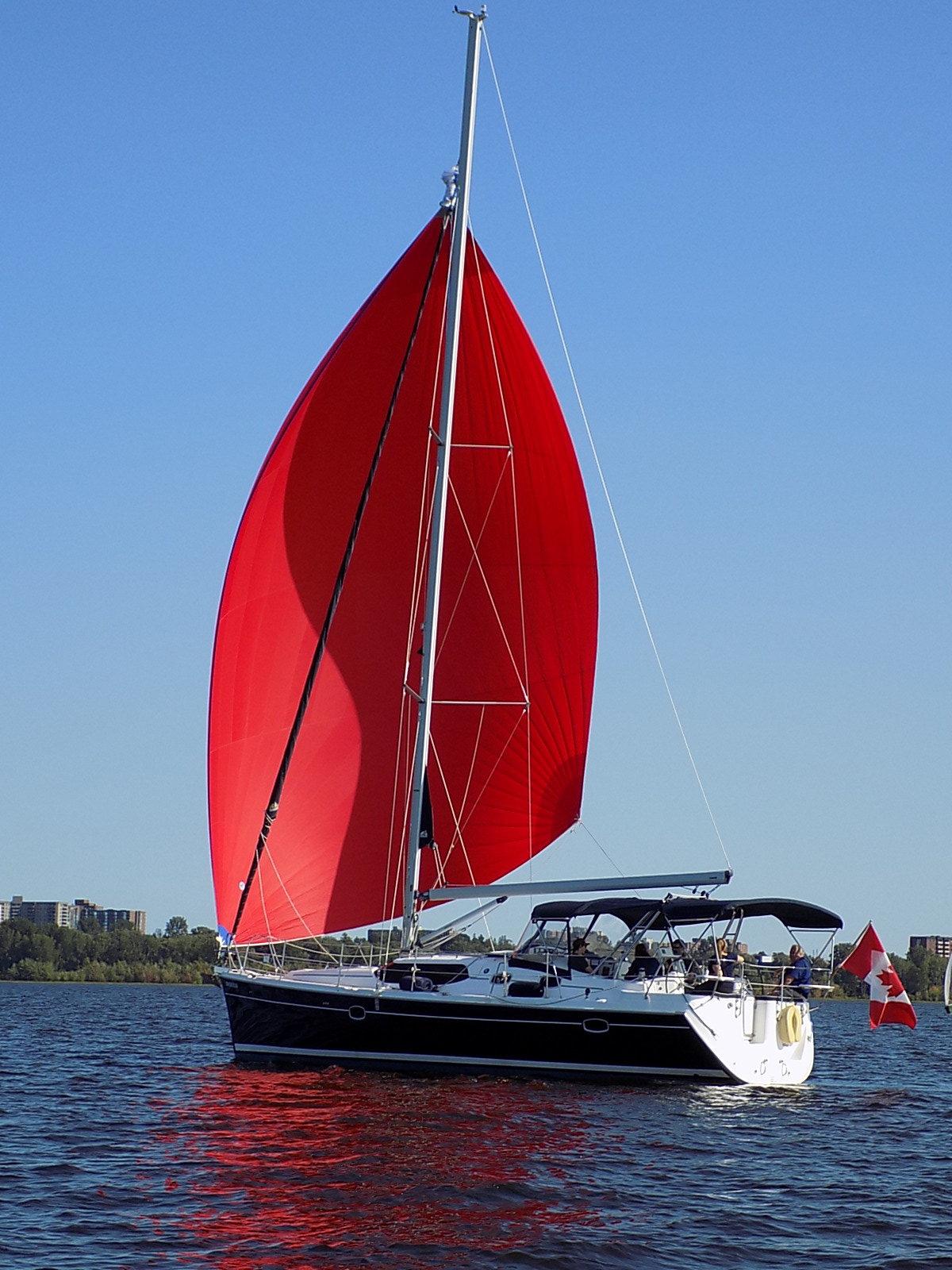
Hunter 45 DS

Hunter boats and year first produced:

- Hunter 140 2003
- Hunter 146 2003
- Hunter 15 2008
- Hunter 170 1999
- Hunter 18 2011
- Hunter 18.5 1987
- Hunter 19-1 1981
- Hunter 19-2 1993
- Hunter 20 1983
- Hunter 212 1996
- Hunter 216 2003
- Hunter 22 1981
- Hunter 23 1985
- Hunter 23.5 1992
- Hunter 240 1998
- Hunter 25 1972
- Hunter 25 Box Top 1972
- Hunter 25-2 2005
- Hunter 25.5 1984
- Hunter 26 1994
- Hunter 26.5 1985
- Hunter 260 1997
- Hunter 27 1974
- Hunter 27 Edge 2006
- Hunter 27-2 1989
- Hunter 27-3 2006
- Hunter 270 2000
- Hunter 27X 2006
- Hunter 28 1989
- Hunter 28.5 1985
- Hunter 280 1995
- Hunter 29.5 1994
- Hunter 290 1999
- Hunter 30 1973
- Hunter 30-2 1988
- Hunter 306 2001
- Hunter 30T 1991
- Hunter 31 1983
- Hunter 31-2 2006
- Hunter 310 1997
- Hunter 32 Vision 1988
- Hunter 320 2000
- Hunter 326 2001
- Hunter 33 1977
- Hunter 33-2004 2004
- Hunter 33.5 1987
- Hunter 333 1988
- Hunter 336 1995
- Hunter 34 1983
- Hunter 340 1997
- Hunter 35 Legend 1986
- Hunter 35.5 Legend 1989
- Hunter 356 2000
- Hunter 36 1980
- Hunter 36 Legend 2001
- Hunter 36 Vision 1990
- Hunter 36-2 2008
- Hunter 37 1978
- Hunter 37 Legend 1986
- Hunter 37.5 Legend 1990
- Hunter 376 1996
- Hunter 38 2004
- Hunter 380 1999
- Hunter 386 1999
- Hunter 39 2009
- Hunter 40 1984
- Hunter 40-2 2012
- Hunter 40.5 1991
- Hunter 41 AC 2004
- Hunter 41 DS 2006
- Hunter 410 1998
- Hunter Passage 42 1989
- Hunter 420 1998
- Hunter 426 2003
- Hunter 43 Legend 1989
- Hunter 430 1995
- Hunter 45 1985
- Hunter 45 CC 2005
- Hunter 45 DS 2006
- Hunter 45 Legend 1985
- Hunter Passage 450 1996
- Hunter 456 2003
- Hunter 460 1999
- Hunter 466 2002
- Hunter 49 2007
- Hunter 50 AC 2010
- Hunter 50 CC 2009
- Hunter 54 1980
- Hunter E33 2011
- Hunter HC 50 2000
- Hunter Xcite 2002
- JY 15 1989
- Marlow-Hunter 15 2003
- Marlow-Hunter 18 2011
- Marlow-Hunter 22 2010
- Marlow-Hunter 31 2015
- Marlow-Hunter 33 2011
- Marlow-Hunter 37 2014
- Marlow-Hunter 39 2009
- Marlow-Hunter 40 2012
- Marlow-Hunter 42SS 2016
- Marlow-Hunter 47 2016
- Marlow-Hunter 50 2010
- Marlow-Hunter 50 Center Cockpit 2009
- Moorings 295 1994
- Moorings 335 1988

== See also ==
- List of sailboat designers and manufacturers
