= Hunter 30-2 =

Sailboat class

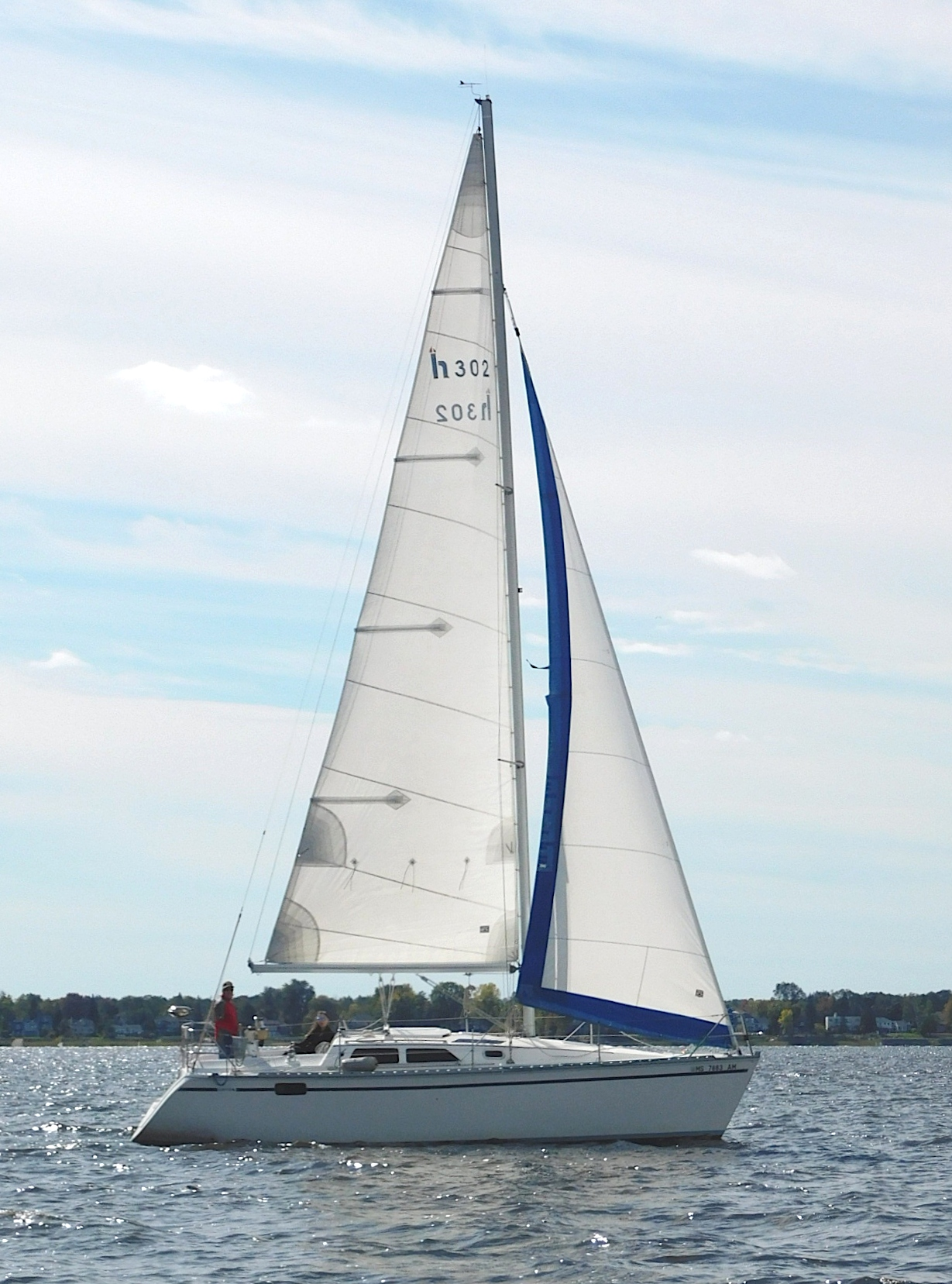

Development
- Location: United States
- Year: 1988
- Builder: Hunter Marine
- Name: Hunter 30-2

Boat
- Displacement: 10,500 lb (4,763 kg)
- Draft: 4.25 ft (1.30 m)

Hull
- Type: Monohull
- Construction: Fiberglass
- LOA: 30.08 ft (9.17 m)
- LWL: 25.83 ft (7.87 m)
- Beam: 11.00 ft (3.35 m)
- Engine: Inboard engine

Hull appendages
- Keel: Wing keel
- Ballast: 3,800 lb (1,724 kg)
- Rudder: internally-mounted spade-type rudder

Rig
- Rig type: Bermuda rig
- I foretriangle height: 36.83 ft (11.23 m)
- J foretriangle base: 9.75 ft (2.97 m)
- P mainsail luff: 40.60 ft (12.37 m)
- E mainsail foot: 12.50 ft (3.81 m)

Sails
- Sailplan: Fractional rigged sloop
- Mainsail area: 253.75 sq ft (23.574 m^{2})
- Jib/genoa area: 179.55 sq ft (16.681 m^{2})
- Total sail area: 433.30 sq ft (40.255 m^{2})

Racing
- PHRF: 183 (average)

The Hunter 30-2 is an American sailboat, that was built by Hunter Marine in the United States between 1988 and 1992.

The boat was sold under the name Hunter 30, but because the company has sold four designs under that name, this design has become known as the 30-2 to differentiate it.

== Production ==
The design was built by Hunter Marine in the United States between 1988 and 1992.

== Design ==
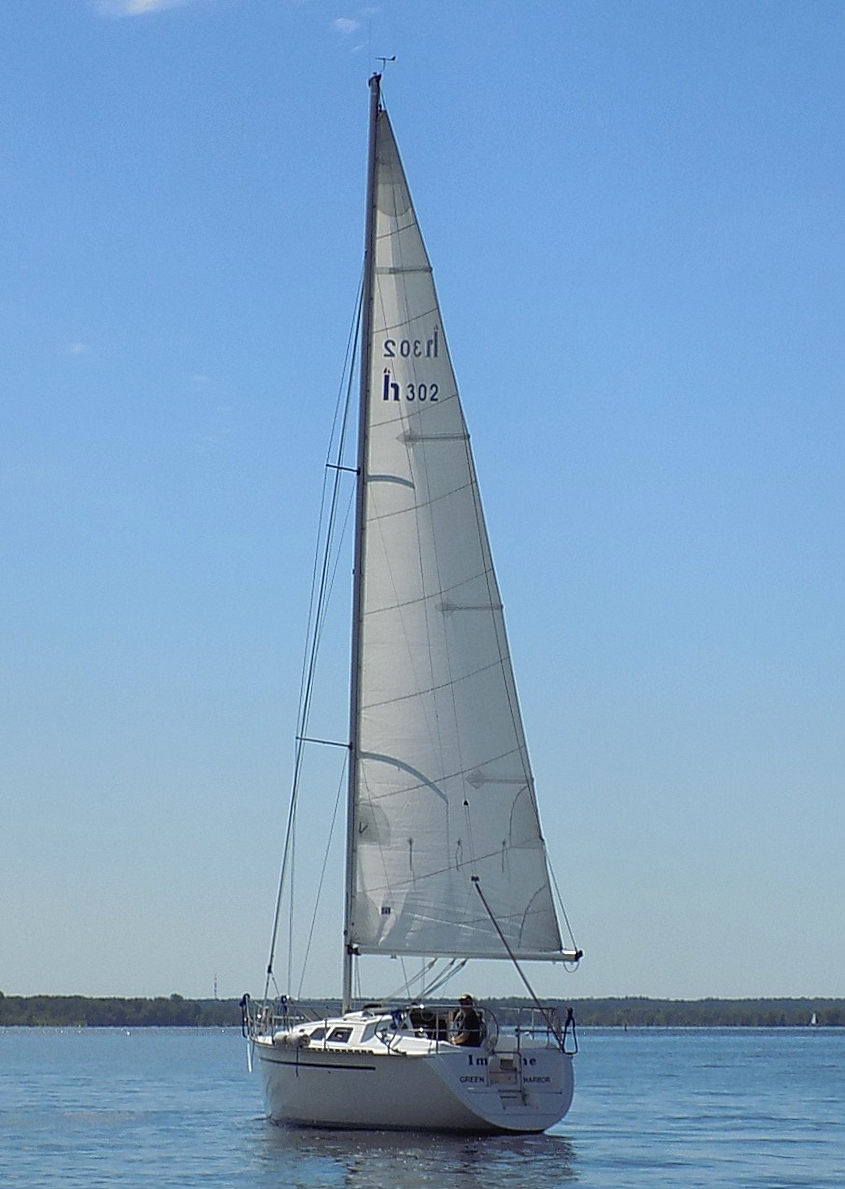
Hunter 30-2

The Hunter 30-2 is a small recreational keelboat, built predominantly of fiberglass. It has a fractional sloop rig, a slightly raked stem, a walk-through reverse transom, an internally-mounted spade-type rudder controlled by a wheel and a fixed wing keel. It displaces 10,500 lb (4,763 kg) and carries 3,800 lb (1,724 kg) of ballast.

The boat has

predominantly of fiberglass. It has a fractional sloop rig, a slightly raked stem, a walk-through reverse transom, an internally-mounted spade-type rudder controlled by a wheel and a fixed wing keel. It displaces 10,500 lb (4,763 kg) and carries 3,800 lb (1,724 kg) of ballast.

The boat has a draft of 4.25 ft (1.30 m) with the standard wing keel.

The boat is fitted with an inboard engine. The fuel tank holds 18 U.S. gallons (68 L; 15 imp gal) and the fresh water tank has a capacity of 37 U.S. gallons (140 L; 31 imp gal).

The design was factory delivered with a shower and hot water tank, double sinks, oven and stove top, and an icebox, as standard equipment.

The design has a PHRF racing average handicap of 183 with a high of 191 and low of 174. It has a hull speed of 6.81 kn (12.61 km/h).

== See also ==
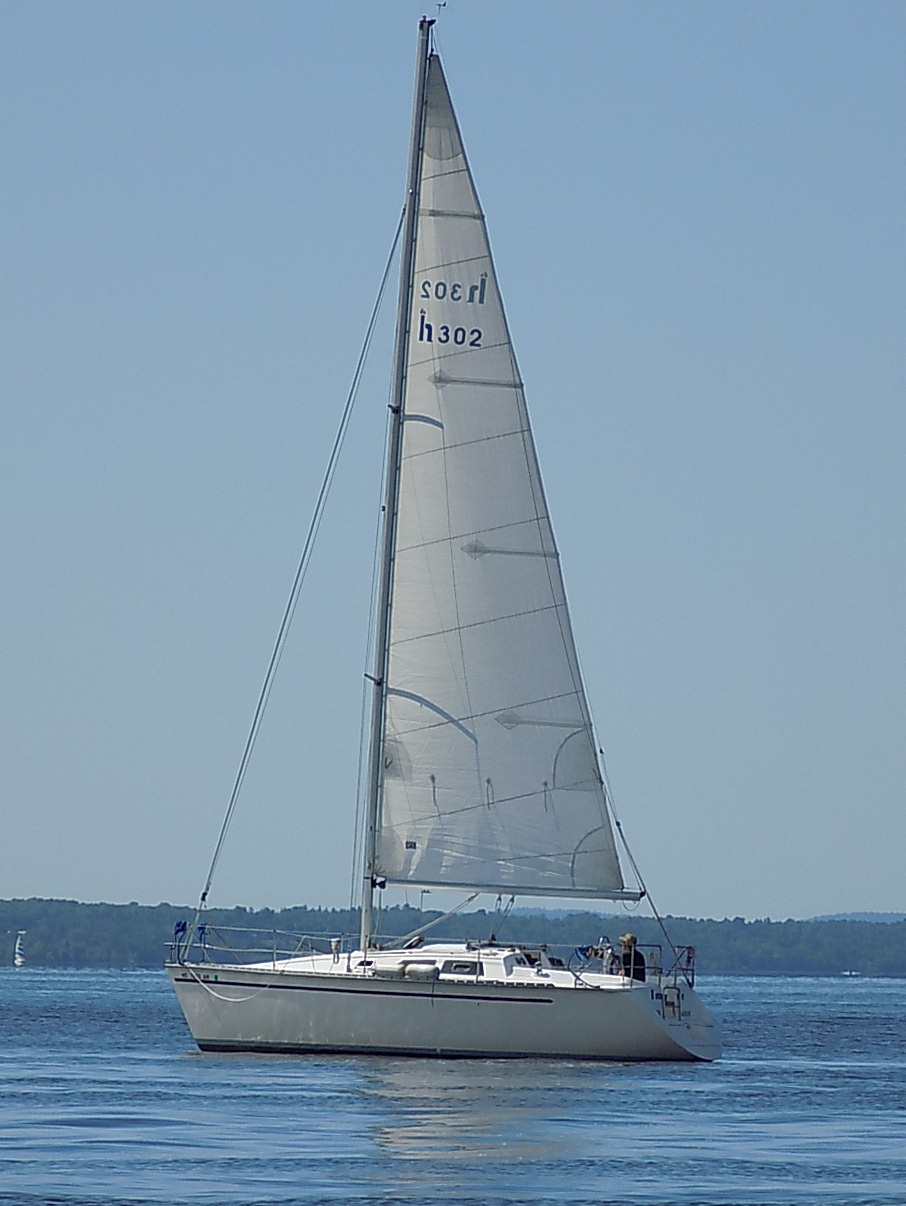
Hunter 30-2

- List of sailing boat types
