= B&R rig =

Variant of the Bermuda sailboat rig

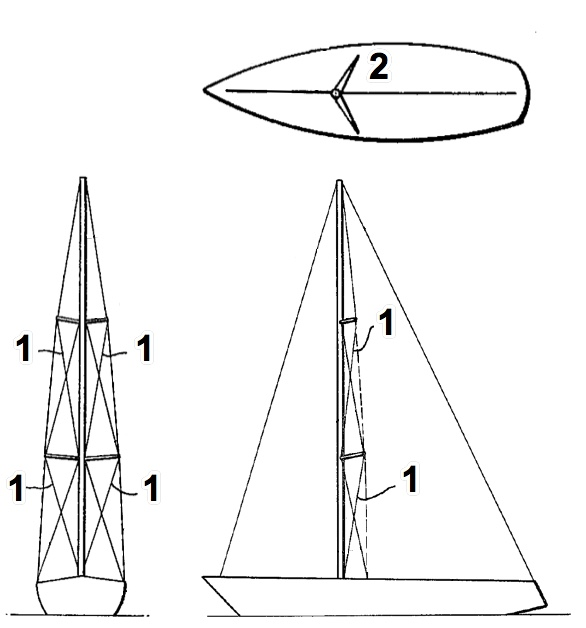
Characteristics of the B&R rig include swept spreaders (2) and reverse-diagonal shrouds (1).

The B&R rig is a variant of the Bermuda sailboat rig, designed and patented by Swedish aeronautical engineers Lars Bergström and Sven Ridder. It employs swept spreaders that are usually angled aft, together with "stays" running diagonally downward from the tip of the spreaders to the attachment of the next pair of spreaders to the mast or to the intersection of the mast with the deck (so-called reverse-diagonal shrouds) that facilitates a pre-bend of the mast (curving aft) that is sometimes tuned into the rig before it is stepped onto the boat. Conventional shrouds thereby contribute to both lateral and longitudinal stability, unlike rigs with unswept spreaders. A B&R rig can be a masthead or fractional rig depending on how stays are configured; a backstay is optional. Such rigs are employed in many of the models of at least one U.S. manufacturer and in many thousands of boats, worldwide.

== History ==
The earliest B&R rig was the result of wind tunnel tests and research by Lars Bergstrom and Sven Ridder at Sweden's Royal Institute of Technology. The first generation, built around 1970, included a backstay and was used on many production boats. A patent application for the B&R rig was submitted in 1973 and was granted in 1975. A second generation eliminated the backstay but used solid, deck-mounted struts to brace the lower mast section. In 1982 a second generation B&R rig with 2 forestays was incorporated into the 60 ft (18.3 m) "breakthrough" racing yacht Thursday's Child. On February 13, 1989 Thursday's Child beat the 135 year old clipper ship record sailing 15,000 mi (24,140 km) from New York to San Francisco. A third generation B&R rig mounted the mast on a tripod of struts, had a single forestay and no backstay. In 1993 the third generation was incorporated into the all carbon/kevlar 68 ft (20.7 m) yacht Route 66. The 60 ft (18.3 m) yacht Hunter's Child finished 2nd in the 1994-95 BOC Challenge using a second generation B&R rig. By 1997 more than 10,000 production sailboats were using the B&R rig.

== Tuning ==
Part of the design of the B&R rig involves inducing a "pre-bend" in the mast which provides some of the side-to-side and fore-and-aft stability of the rig. The pre-bend is achieved by tensioning the reverse diagonals and certain other so called intermediate shrouds. Because the spreaders are swept back at approximately a 25° to 30° angle, this tensioning bows the mast. Balanced and proper tensioning keeps the bow and the mast aligned in the fore-aft direction and eliminates any curvature in the sideways direction. The pre-bend is generally set up on the ground before the mast is stepped (placed onto the boat). The mast is then stepped and all other standing rigging is attached to the boat and properly tensioned.

== Boat and yacht models incorporating B&R rigs ==
The majority of Hunter Marine's fleet incorporated the B&R rig. However, manufacturers on both sides of the Atlantic Ocean have employed B&R rigs in their boat designs.

Models with 1st Generation B&R rigs

Boatbuilder	Model	1st Year Produced	Last year Produced	Ref
Hunter Marine	31	1983	1987	
Hunter Marine	34	late 1982	1987	
Hunter Marine	Passage 42	1989	1998	
AB Radab	Windex 92	1981	1991	

Models with 2nd Generation B&R rigs

Boatbuilder	Model	1st Year Produced	Last year Produced	Ref
Hunter Marine	420	1998	2004	
Hunter Marine	Passage 450	1996		
Hurley Marine Ltd. (UK)	Tailwind 38	1973	1974	
Torkel Batar (Sweden)	B&R 23	1993	-	

Models with 3rd Generation B&R rigs

Boatbuilder	Model	1st Year Produced	Last year Produced	Ref
Goetz Custom Sailboats	Route 66	1993		
