= Roller furling =

Method of furling a yacht's staysail

A simple home-built jib furler, showing the furling line ready to furl the jib, and (inset) showing the furled jib

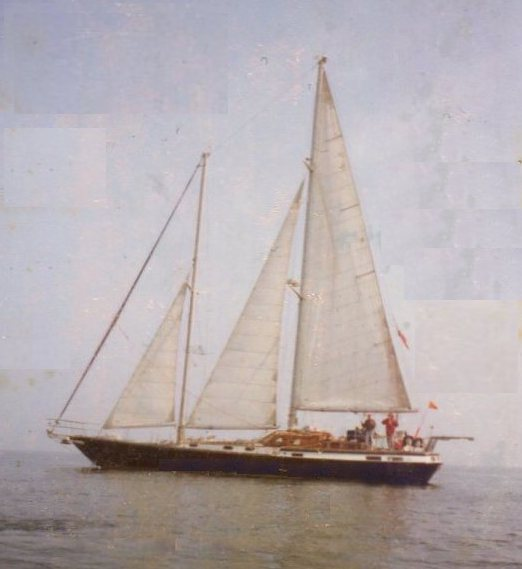
This staysail schooner's large genoa has been roller-furled away, while its staysails are hanked on.

Roller furling is a method of furling (i.e. reefing) a yacht's staysail by rolling the sail around a stay. Roller furling is typically used for foresails such as jibs or genoas.

A mainsail may also be furled by a similar system, whereby the sail is furled within the mast or around a rotating boom (or around a rotating shaft within a boom). Although staysail roller-furling is effective and very common, in-mast or in-boom mainsail furling involves some compromises, and mainsail slab reefing gives a better sail shape.

== Methods ==
The idea for a furling jib is usually attributed to Major E du Boulay in England who invented a device similar to a roller blind for reefing a jib. Major Wykeham-Martin used one of Boulay's rollers and improved the system by incorporating roller bearings in 1907 when the system was patented. The original castings were made by London-based toilet makers Bouldings. Furling systems are commonplace on cruising yachts today.

An early version of staysail roller furling was as follows: the leading edge of the sail (luff) to be furled is stiffened in some way, such as by attaching it to a length of plastic pipe or by sewing in a stiffening material such as foam. This stiffened edge serves to spread the force of the furler along the edge of the sail, so that the sail will furl along its full length. This stiffened edge is then attached to the source of energy for furling, which may be a handle that is turned, a spool containing a line that is pulled, or a motor.

Murray Scheiner, a sailor and professional rigging designer from Great Neck, New York, modernized the furling jib in the late 1960s. His inspiration came from observing a disabled sailor friend who required several crew members to hoist the jib, preventing him from sailing independently. This invention greatly changed sailing for professionals and leisure sailors alike.

The simplest and most common furling systems are for jibs and other headsails. These generally consist of either a plastic pipe or a specially stiffened jib, and a spool to hold the furling line. The jib is attached to the furler, and the line is wound around the spool. When the line is pulled, the furler turns, rolling up the jib; when the furling line is released, the jibsheet may be used to unfurl the jib.

The other common type of furling system is for the mainsail. The mainsail may be furled into the mast or the boom, with boom furling systems being simpler and more common. The simplest boom furling system consists of a boom that can rotate along its axis, with a latch to lock it in place. Provision must be made to allow the mainsail to wrap around the boom without interfering with the mainsheet, such as end-boom sheeting or a bridle. To furl the mainsail, the boom is unlocked, and then rotated to take up the desired amount of mainsail, and then locked in place. More advanced boom furling systems will wrap the furling mechanism in a slotted cover, so the sail furls inside the cover; this also makes sheeting easier, since the sheet may be attached to the outer portion of the boom. These systems use either a line, a hand-operated crank, or a hydraulic or electric powered furler.

== Requirements ==
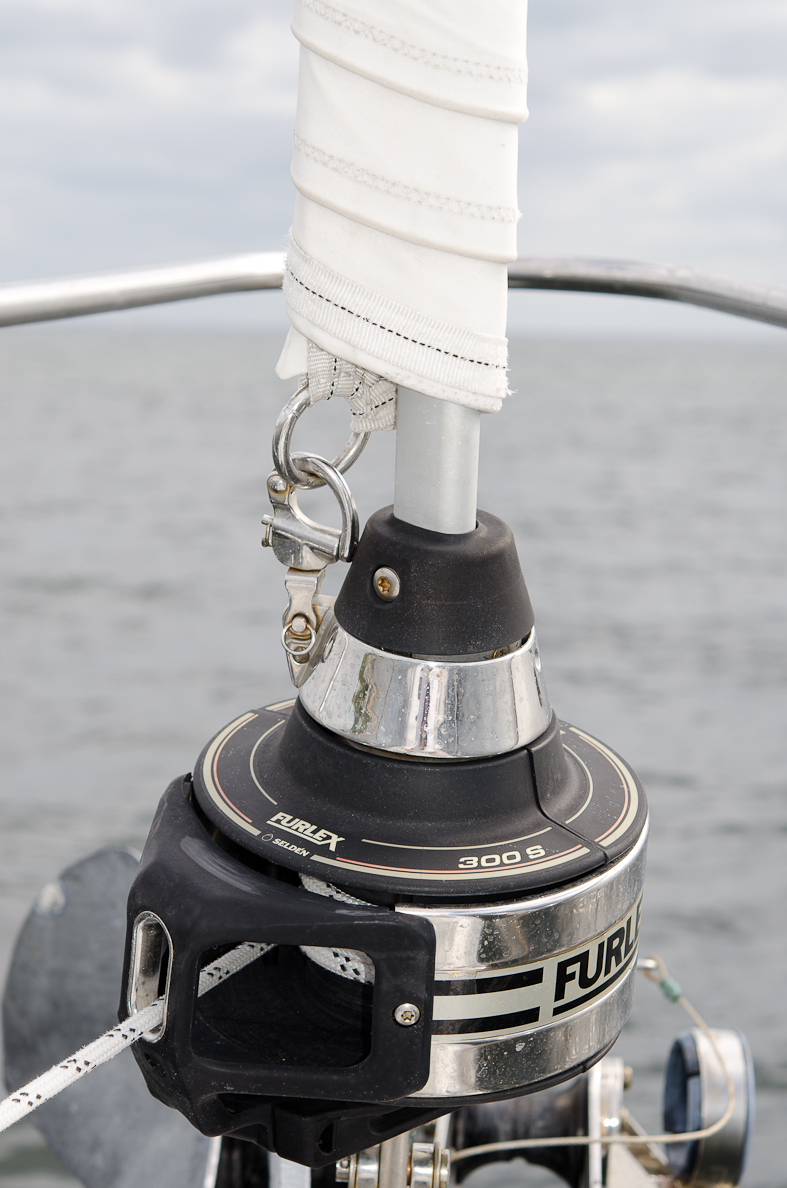
Jib roller furling drum

To be successfully furled, a sail must be flexible enough to wrap around a tight radius. Sail stiffening devices such as battens can be accommodated by roller furling systems when they lie parallel to the mast; otherwise furling must be stopped at the lowest batten or the battens must be removed.

The sail must also have a fairly straight edge to lie along the furling roller, and be flat enough to form a neat, compact roll. If the sail meets these conditions, then it may be suitable for use with a roller furling system; if the sail is not, then it may be possible to replace the sail with one of a design more conducive to furling. Jibs and genoas, for example, are generally suitable for furling, as they are relatively flat, while a gennaker, with its larger degree of camber, is probably not suitable for furling. In particularly windy areas, sometimes a separate smaller jib may be separately rigged as a Solent to avoid the disadvantage of a partially furled Genoa.

Boom furling mainsails also must deal with the issue of the leading edge. Most sails attach to the mast with sliders or a rope supported edge that rides in a track in the mast, and this adds bulk to the leading edge of the sail as it rolls. This is also an issue when unfurling, as the edge of the sail must be fed smoothly into the mast's track when unfurling. The weight of the sail and furling equipment also increases the boom's mass, which can increase the danger of injury to a crewmember if they are hit by the swinging boom.

Mast furling systems avoid the issues of boom furling, but add their own issues. Mast furling systems essentially eliminate the possibility of battens, as vertical battens are not practical. Without battens, the mainsail must be cut with a hollow leech, like the typical jib, which reduces the sail area. Mast furlers also add mass all along the length of the mast, raising the center of mass of the boat, which decreases stability.
