= Winged keel =

Keel type

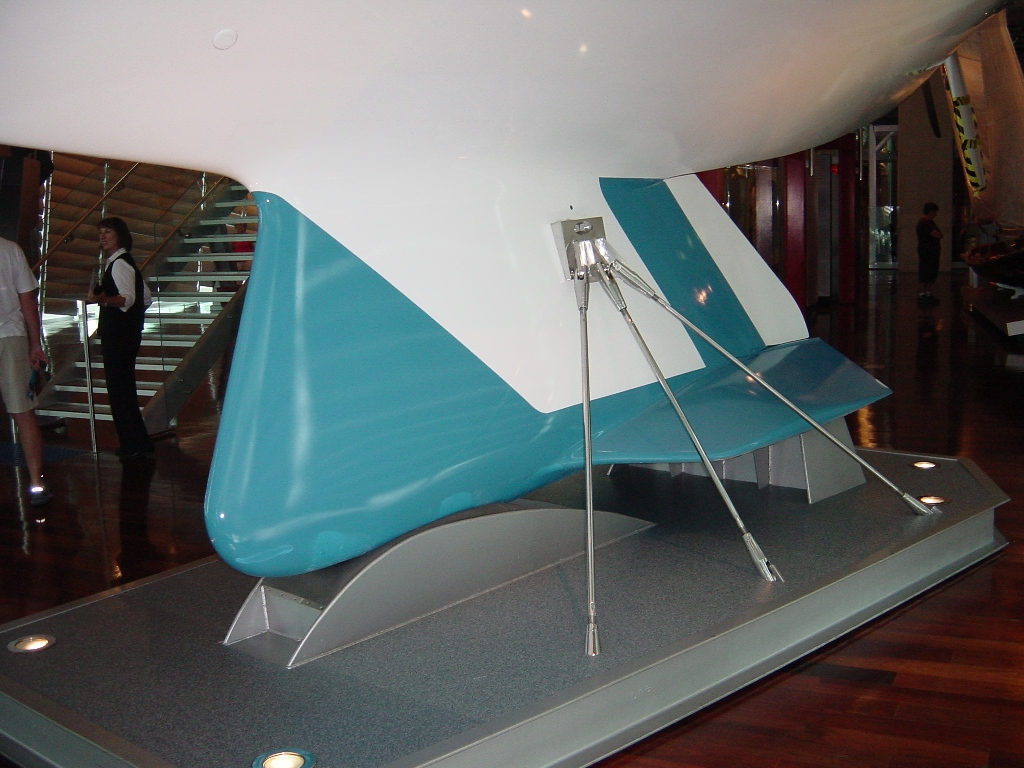
Winged keel of Australia II

The winged keel is a sailboat keel layout first fitted on the 12-metre class yacht Australia II, 1983 America's Cup winner.

== Design ==
This layout was adopted by Ben Lexcen, designer of Australia II. Although Ben Lexcen "had tried the winged keel idea before", there is conjecture that it was computed and designed by Dutch aerodynamicist Peter van Oossanen at the Wageningen towing tank (Netherlands Ship Model Bassin).

In May 2024 a detailed article co-written by Peter van Oossanen was published by the Journal of Engineering Ethics which came to the conclusion that Lexcen should not have been credited with the invention on the patent application. It also claimed that he had not been involved with the design because he had departed from Holland before the prototype work which evolved the winglets was carried out.

=== Wings ===
The lateral wings of Australia II are of moderate aspect ratio, forming a nearly horizontal foil, the "wing", at the bottom to provide additional effective span, in the same way as the winglets on an aircraft. Each wing acts as a winglet, effectively increasing the keel aspect ratio therefore reducing the lift-induced drag. Because the yacht is heeled over when sailing upwind, the leeward foil attains more draft, which reduces the loss of efficiency that always occurs under heel. The wings were canted downwards at about 20 degrees, in order to promote proper hydrodynamic loading (lift) on each wing when sailing to windward. Upwind, it offered 30% less resistance due to side force.

=== Upside down keel ===
Note that, contrary to classic configurations, the keel of this boat is "upside down" under the hull (the root chord is smaller than the tip (bottom) chord) in order to minimize the hull-keel interaction and the loss of side force due to the proximity of the water surface. The extra low-positioned lead in the upside down keel and wings gives a very low centre of gravity, increasing the righting moment (lateral stability) and allowing to carry more sail area.

=== Shorter boat, more sail area ===
Under the 12 metre class rule, the allowed sail area is an inverse function of the boat length and weight. Her stability advantage allowed Australia II to carry more sail although the boat was lighter. Along with Australia II's efficient sail design, this winged keel was one of the factors contributing to Australia II's success. Total advantage offered by this concept on the race course was about 1 minute per upwind leg.

== Application ==
Winged keels are generally found on high-performance sailboats if they are not prohibited by class rules. They are especially advantageous for heavy yachts with a lot of sail area (as 12-metre class boats), sailing upwind when the draft is limited by the class rule or by the requirement to be able to sail in shallow water, because in that case high righting moment and efficient side force are difficult to obtain. Downwind, the extra skin friction drag is a hindrance. Besides the performance benefits, winged keels can also be applied to pleasure boats as a way to reduce draft, allowing for greater versatility when cruising in shallow waters.
