= Catalina 28 =

Sailboat class

Catalina 28 Mk II
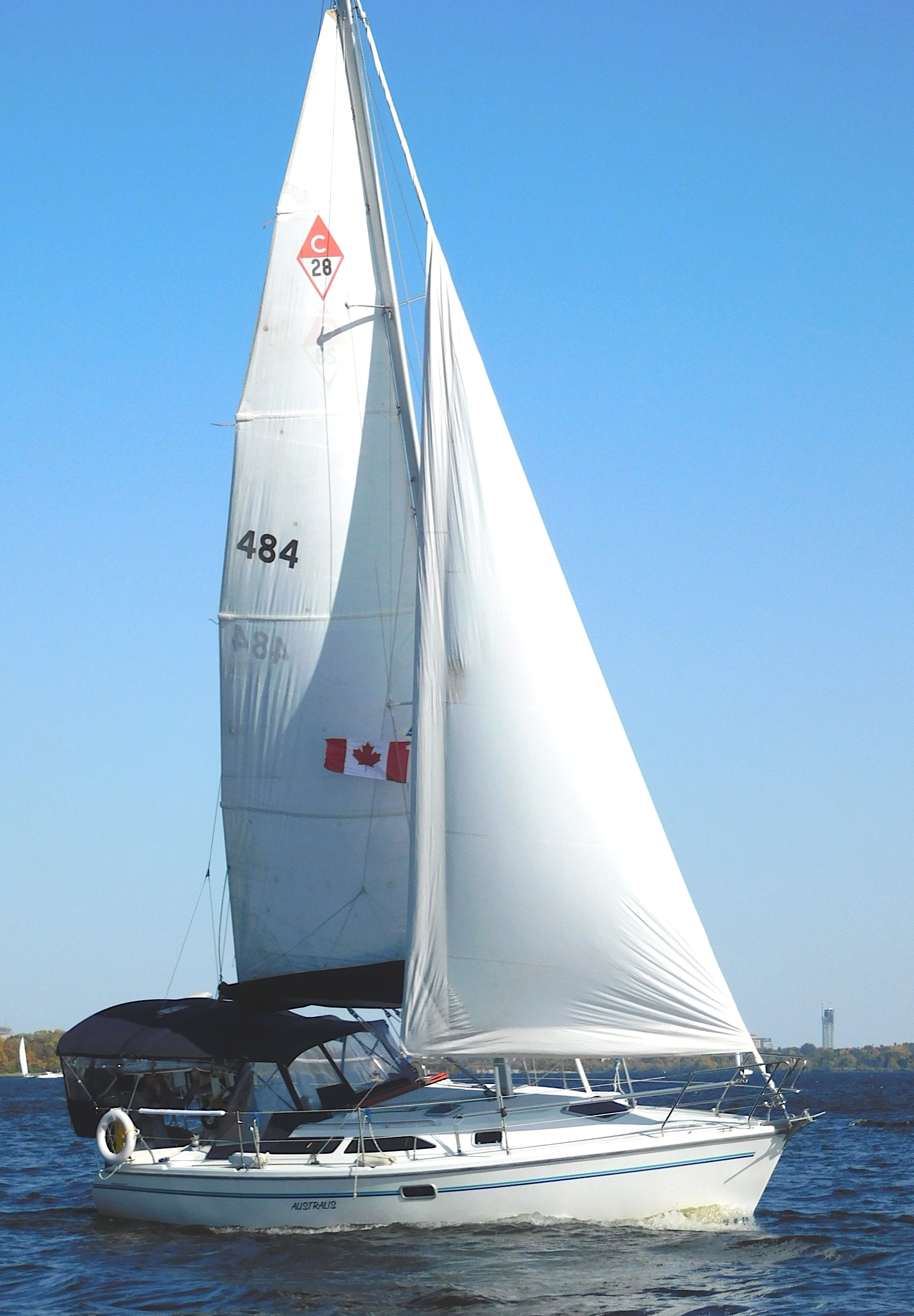
- Catalina 28 Mk II

Development
- Designer: Gerry Douglas
- Location: United States
- Year: 1995
- Builder: Catalina Yachts
- Name: Catalina 28 Mk II

Boat
- Displacement: 8,300 lb (3,765 kg)
- Draft: 5.16 ft (1.57 m)

Hull
- Type: Monohull
- Construction: Fiberglass
- LOA: 29.42 ft (8.97 m)
- LWL: 23.83 ft (7.26 m)
- Beam: 10.33 ft (3.15 m)
- Engine: Universal 25XPBC diesel engine

Hull appendages
- Keel: fin keel
- Ballast: 3,200 lb (1,451 kg)
- Rudder: internally-mounted spade-type rudder

Rig
- General: Masthead sloop
- I foretriangle height: 36.50 ft (11.13 m)
- J foretriangle base: 10.83 ft (3.30 m)
- P mainsail luff: 31.83 ft (9.70 m)
- E mainsail foot: 10.75 ft (3.28 m)

Sails
- Mainsail area: 171.09 sq ft (15.895 m^{2})
- Jib/genoa area: 197.65 sq ft (18.362 m^{2})
- Total sail area: 368.73 sq ft (34.256 m^{2})

Racing
- PHRF: 198 (average)

The Catalina 28 is an American sailboat, that was designed by Gerry Douglas and first built in 1991.

== Production ==
The boat was built by Catalina Yachts in the United States, in two versions, but it is now out of production. The first version, The Catalina 28, was produced from 1991 to 1995, with 620 examples completed. The Mk II was produced from 1995 to 2010.

== Design ==
The Catalina 28 is a small recreational keelboat, built predominantly of fiberglass. It has a masthead sloop rig, an internally-mounted spade-type rudder and a fixed fin keel.

== Variants ==
Catalina 28
This model was designed by Gerry Douglas and introduced in 1991, with 620 examples completed. It has a length overall of 28.50 ft (8.7 m), a waterline length of 23.83 ft (7.3 m), displaces 8,300 lb (3,765 kg) and carries 3,600 lb (1,633 kg) of iron ballast. The boat has a draft of 5.25 ft (1.60 m) with the standard keel and 4.5 ft (1.4 m) with the optional shoal draft wing keel. The wing keel version displaces 8,200 lb (3,719 kg) and carries 3,500 lb (1,588 kg) of iron ballast. The boat is fitted with a Universal M3-20 diesel engine. The boat has a PHRF racing average handicap of 201 with a high of 210 and low of 195. It has a hull speed of 6.54 kn (12.11 km/h). A tall mast version was available with a mast approximately 3 ft (0.91 m) higher. The tall mast version has a PHRF racing average handicap of 192 with a high of 200 and low of 186.

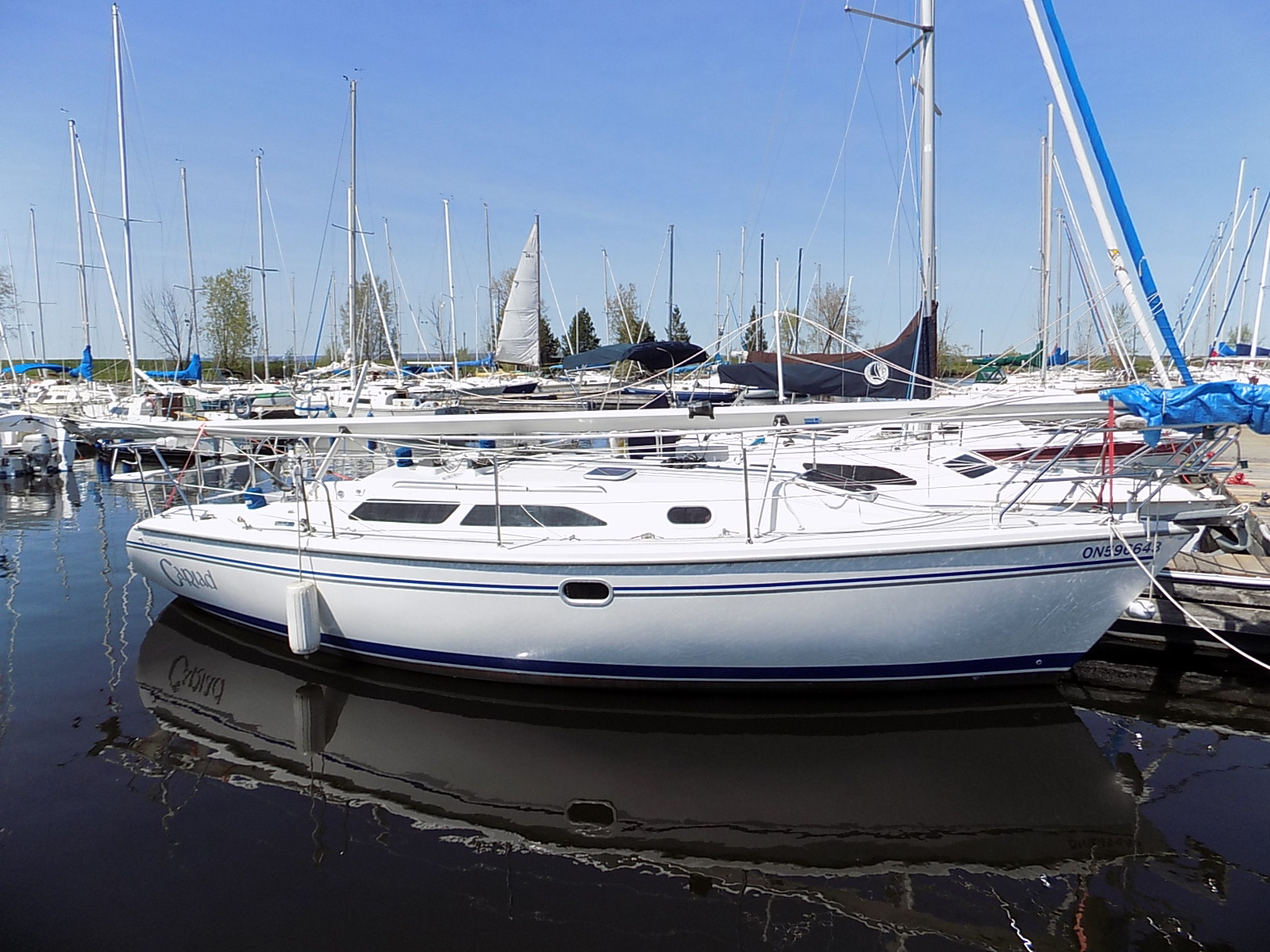
Catalina 28 Mk II

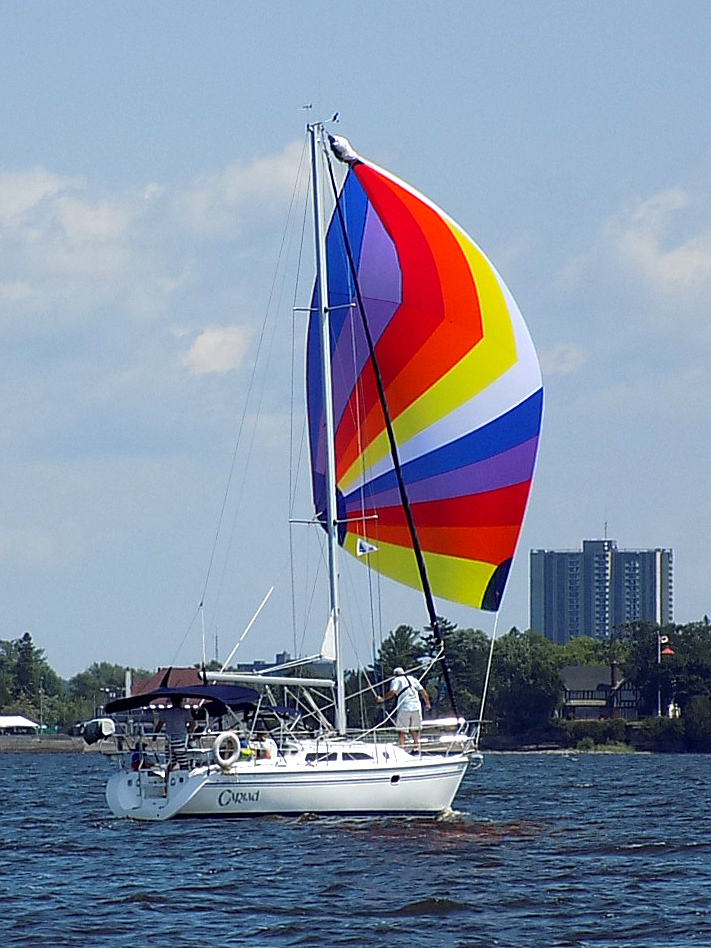
Catalina 28 Mk II flying its spinnaker

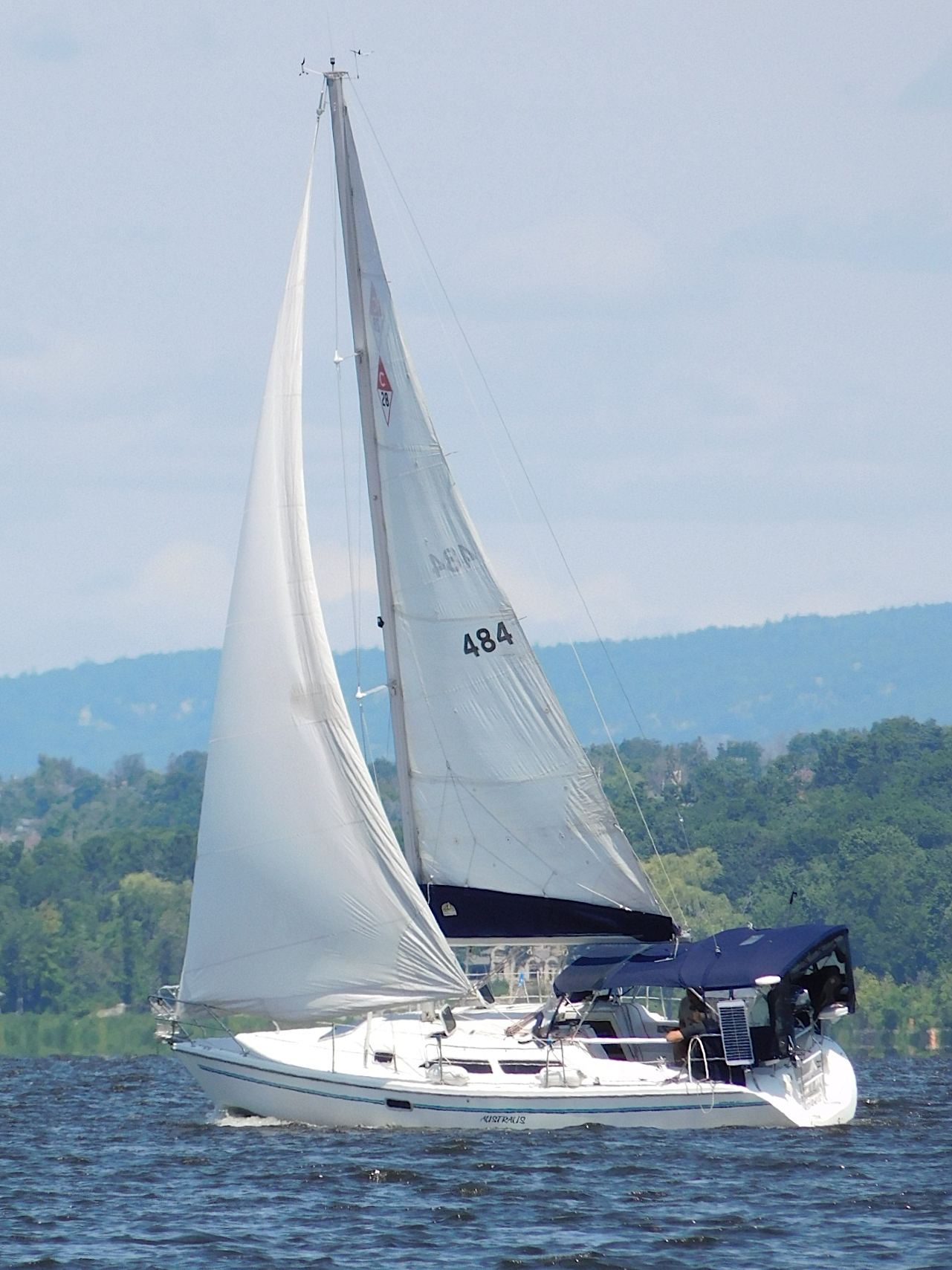
Catalina 28 Mk II

Catalina 28 Mk II
This model was also designed by Gerry Douglas, introduced in 1995 and produced until 2010. The improvements include a widened aft hull, giving a larger aft cabin and a redesigned galley, plus an improvement of the basic sail control arrangements. It has a length overall of 29.42 ft (9.0 m), a waterline length of 23.83 ft (7.3 m), displaces 8,300 lb (3,765 kg) and carries 3,200 lb (1,451 kg) of iron ballast. The boat has a draft of 5.16 ft (1.57 m) with the standard keel and 4.5 ft (1.4 m) with the optional shoal draft wing keel. The wing keel version displaces 8,200 lb (3,719 kg) and carries 3,500 lb (1,588 kg) of iron ballast. The boat is fitted with a Universal 25XPBC diesel engine. The fuel tank holds 19 U.S. gallons (72 L; 16 imp gal) and the fresh water tank has a capacity of 49 U.S. gallons (190 L; 41 imp gal). The boat has a PHRF racing average handicap of 198 with a high of 205 and low of 192. It has a hull speed of 6.54 kn (12.11 km/h).

== See also ==
- List of sailing boat types

Similar sailboats

- Aloha 28
- Beneteau First 285
- Beneteau Oceanis 281
- Bristol Channel Cutter
- Cal 28
- Cumulus 28
- Grampian 28
- Hunter 28
- Hunter 28.5
- Hunter 280
- J/28
- Laser 28
- O'Day 28
- Pearson 28
- Sabre 28
- Sea Sprite 27
- Sirius 28
- Tanzer 8.5
- Tanzer 28
- TES 28 Magnam
- Viking 28
