= Grampian 28 =

Sailboat class

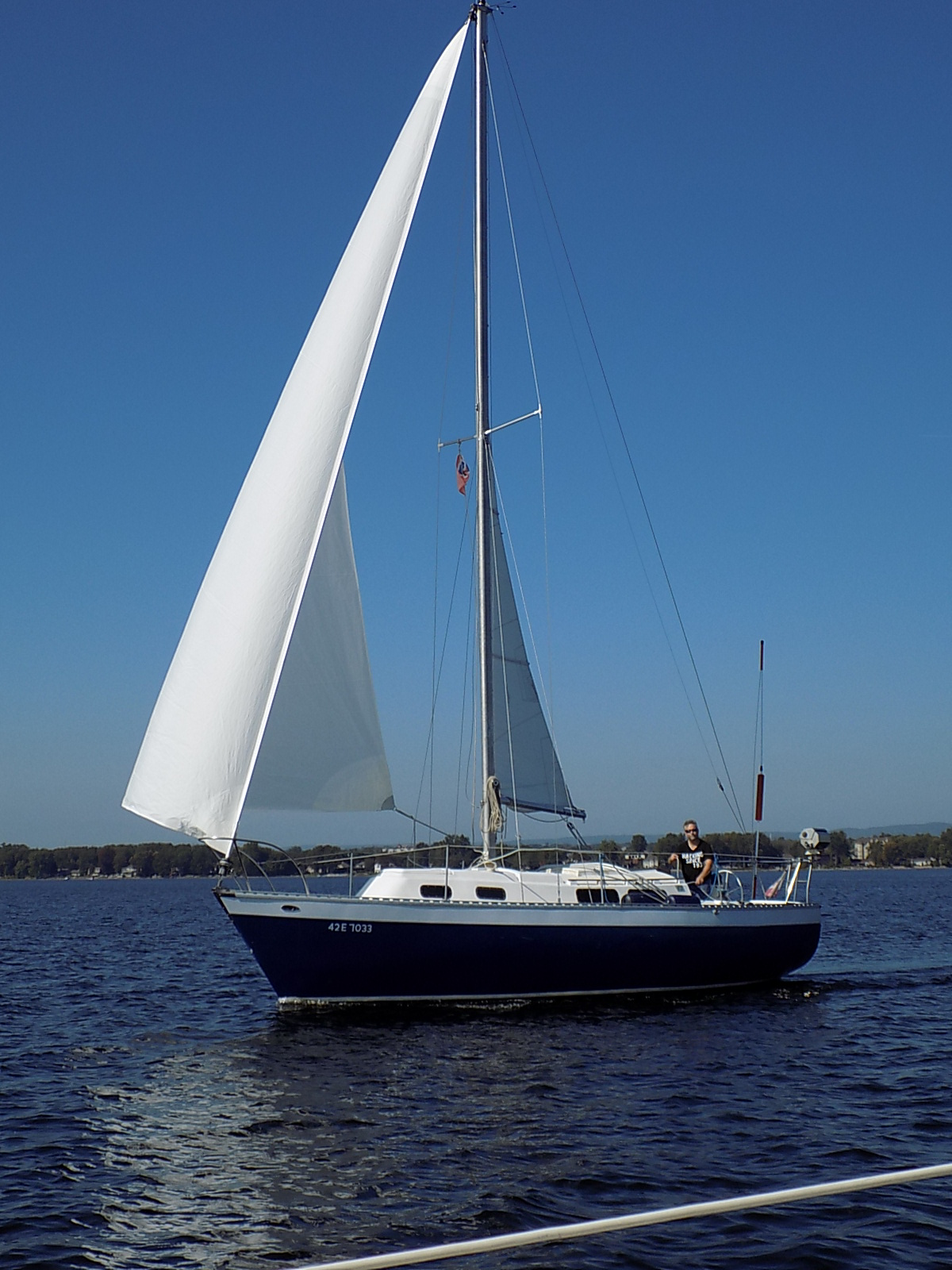

Development
- Designer: Rolf van der Sleen
- Location: Canada
- Year: 1975
- No. built: 107
- Builder: Grampian Marine
- Name: Grampian 28

Boat
- Displacement: 6,900 lb (3,130 kg)
- Draft: 4.83 ft (1.47 m)

Hull
- Type: Monohull
- Construction: Fiberglass
- LOA: 28.00 ft (8.53 m)
- LWL: 24.50 ft (7.47 m)
- Beam: 9.50 ft (2.90 m)
- Engine: Volvo diesel engine

Hull appendages
- Keel: fin keel
- Ballast: 3,060 lb (1,388 kg)
- Rudder: skeg-mounted rudder

Rig
- General: Masthead sloop
- I foretriangle height: 36.50 ft (11.13 m)
- J foretriangle base: 12.00 ft (3.66 m)
- P mainsail luff: 31.50 ft (9.60 m)
- E mainsail foot: 10.50 ft (3.20 m)

Sails
- Mainsail area: 165.38 sq ft (15.364 m^{2})
- Jib/genoa area: 219.00 sq ft (20.346 m^{2})
- Total sail area: 384.38 sq ft (35.710 m^{2})

Racing
- PHRF: 195 (average)

The Grampian 28 is a Canadian sailboat, that was designed by Rolf van der Sleen and first built in 1975.

== Production ==
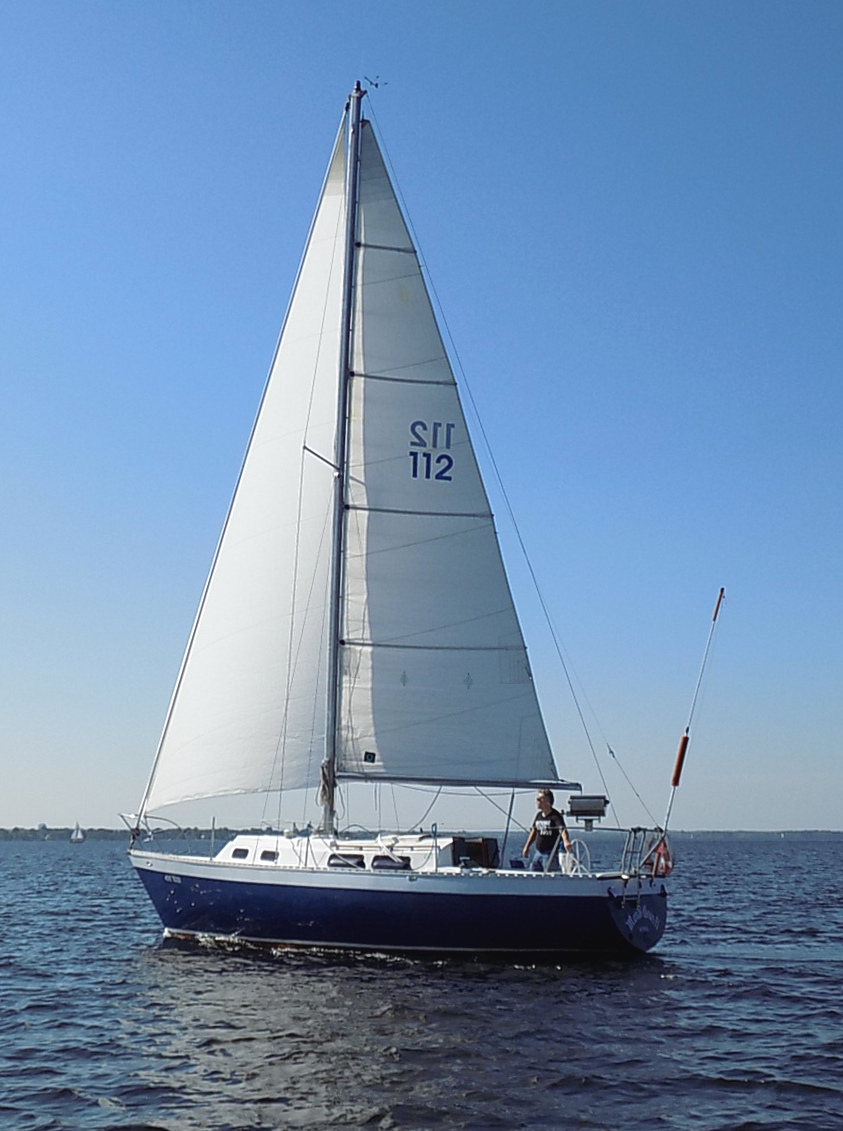
Grampian 28

The boat was built by Grampian Marine in Oakville, Ontario, Canada starting in 1975 and 107 examples were completed, but it is now out of production.

The Grampian 28 design was later developed into the Intrepid 28 and built by Intrepid Yachts, a division of Cape Dory Yachts, using the same tooling.

== Design ==
The Grampian 28 is a recreational keelboat, built predominantly of fiberglass, with wood trim. It has a masthead sloop rig, a skeg-mounted rudder and a fixed fin keel. It displaces 6,900 lb (3,130 kg) and carries 3,060 lb (1,388 kg) of ballast.

The boat has a draft of 4.83 ft (1.47 m) with the standard keel fitted and 3.75 ft (1.14 m) with the optional shoal draft keel.

The design is fitted with a Swedish Volvo diesel engine. The fuel tank holds 20 U.S. gallons (76 L; 17 imp gal) and the fresh water tank has a capacity of 20 U.S. gallons (76 L; 17 imp gal).

The boat has a PHRF racing average handicap of 195 with a high of 186 and low of 204. It has a hull speed of 6.63 kn (12.28 km/h).

== Operational history ==
In a review Michael McGoldrick wrote, "The Grampian 28 is more contemporary and nicer looking than the other Grampian models... Although it has a fairly high freeboard, it doesn't have the spoon-bow which is characteristic of some other Grampian models. While this 28 footer may not be as plentiful as either the Grampian 26 or 30... This boat has a nice interior layout which includes a quarter berth."

== See also ==
- List of sailing boat types

Similar sailboats

- Alerion Express 28
- Aloha 28
- Beneteau First 285
- Beneteau Oceanis 281
- Bristol Channel Cutter
- Cal 28
- Catalina 28
- Cumulus 28
- Hunter 28
- Hunter 28.5
- Hunter 280
- J/28
- Laser 28
- O'Day 28
- Pearson 28
- Sabre 28
- Sea Sprite 27
- Sirius 28
- Tanzer 8.5
- Tanzer 28
- TES 28 Magnam
- Viking 28
