= Cal 28 =

Sailboat class

Development
- Designer: C. William Lapworth
- Location: United States
- Year: 1963
- No. built: 347
- Builders: Cal Yachts; Calgan Marine
- Name: Cal 28

Boat
- Displacement: 6,000 lb (2,722 kg)
- Draft: 4.50 ft (1.37 m)

Hull
- Type: Monohull
- Construction: Fiberglass
- LOA: 28.00 ft (8.53 m)
- LWL: 22.50 ft (6.86 m)
- Beam: 9.00 ft (2.74 m)
- Engine: Universal Atomic 4 gasoline engine

Hull appendages
- Keel: fin keel
- Ballast: 2,200 lb (998 kg)
- Rudder: internally-mounted spade-type rudder

Rig
- General: Masthead sloop
- I foretriangle height: 33.00 ft (10.06 m)
- J foretriangle base: 11.40 ft (3.47 m)
- P mainsail luff: 28.00 ft (8.53 m)
- E mainsail foot: 11.70 ft (3.57 m)

Sails
- Mainsail area: 163.80 sq ft (15.218 m^{2})
- Jib/genoa area: 188.10 sq ft (17.475 m^{2})
- Total sail area: 351.90 sq ft (32.693 m^{2})

Racing
- PHRF: 183 (average)

The Cal 28 is an American sailboat, that was designed by C. William Lapworth and first built in 1963. It was originally marketed as the California 28.

== Production ==
The boat was built by Cal Yachts in the United States between 1963 and 1969, but it is now out of production.

The design was also built under licence by Calgan Marine in North Vancouver, Canada.

A total of 347 examples of the type were completed.

== Design ==
The Cal 28 is a small recreational keelboat, built predominantly of fiberglass. It has a masthead sloop rig, an internally-mounted spade-type rudder and a fixed fin keel. It displaces 6,000 lb (2,722 kg) and carries 2,200 lb (998 kg) of lead ballast.

The boat has a draft of 4.50 ft (1.37 m) with the standard keel fitted.

A Universal Atomic 4 gasoline engine with a "V" drive was a factory option. The fuel tank holds 18 U.S. gallons (68 L; 15 imp gal) and the fresh water tank has a capacity of 28 U.S. gallons (110 L; 23 imp gal).

The boat has a PHRF racing average handicap of 183 with a high of 186 and low of 180. It has a hull speed of 6.36 kn (11.78 km/h).

== See also ==
- List of sailing boat types

Similar sailboats

- Alerion Express 28
- Aloha 28
- Beneteau First 285
- Beneteau Oceanis 281
- Bristol Channel Cutter
- Catalina 28
- Cumulus 28
- Grampian 28
- Hunter 28
- Hunter 28.5
- Hunter 280
- J/28
- Laser 28
- O'Day 28
- Pearson 28
- Sabre 28
- Sea Sprite 27
- Sirius 28
- Tanzer 8.5
- Tanzer 28
- TES 28 Magnam
- Viking 28
