= O'Day 28 =

Sailboat class

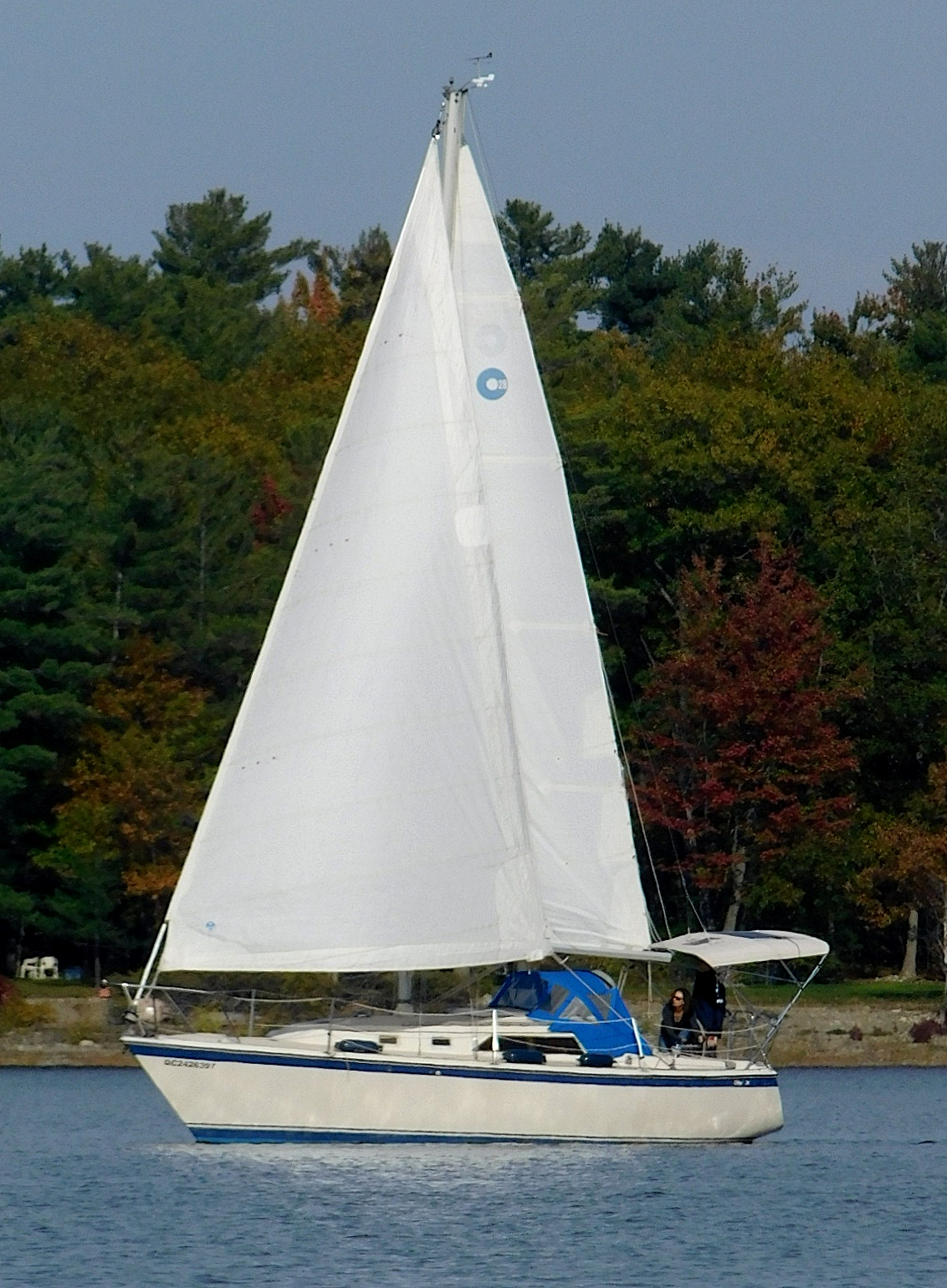

Development
- Designer: C. Raymond Hunt Associates
- Location: United States
- Year: 1978
- No. built: 507
- Builder: O'Day Corp. (Bangor Punta)
- Name: O'Day 28

Boat
- Displacement: 7,300 lb (3,311 kg)
- Draft: 4.50 ft (1.37 m)

Hull
- Type: Monohull
- Construction: Fiberglass
- LOA: 28.25 ft (8.61 m)
- LWL: 22.92 ft (6.99 m)
- Beam: 10.25 ft (3.12 m)
- Engine: Universal 12 10 hp (7 kW) diesel engine

Hull appendages
- Keel: fin keel
- Ballast: 2,550 lb (1,157 kg)
- Rudder: internally-mounted spade-type rudder

Rig
- Rig type: Bermuda rig
- I foretriangle height: 36.00 ft (10.97 m)
- J foretriangle base: 12.08 ft (3.68 m)
- P mainsail luff: 30.50 ft (9.30 m)
- E mainsail foot: 10.00 ft (3.05 m)

Sails
- Sailplan: Masthead sloop
- Mainsail area: 152.50 sq ft (14.168 m^{2})
- Jib/genoa area: 217.44 sq ft (20.201 m^{2})
- Total sail area: 369.94 sq ft (34.369 m^{2})

The O'Day 28 is an American sailboat, that was designed by C. Raymond Hunt Associates and first built in 1978.

== Production ==
The design was built by O'Day Corp. (owned by Bangor Punta and later Lear Siegler) in the United States between 1978 and 1986, but it is now out of production. A total of 507 examples were completed.

== Design ==
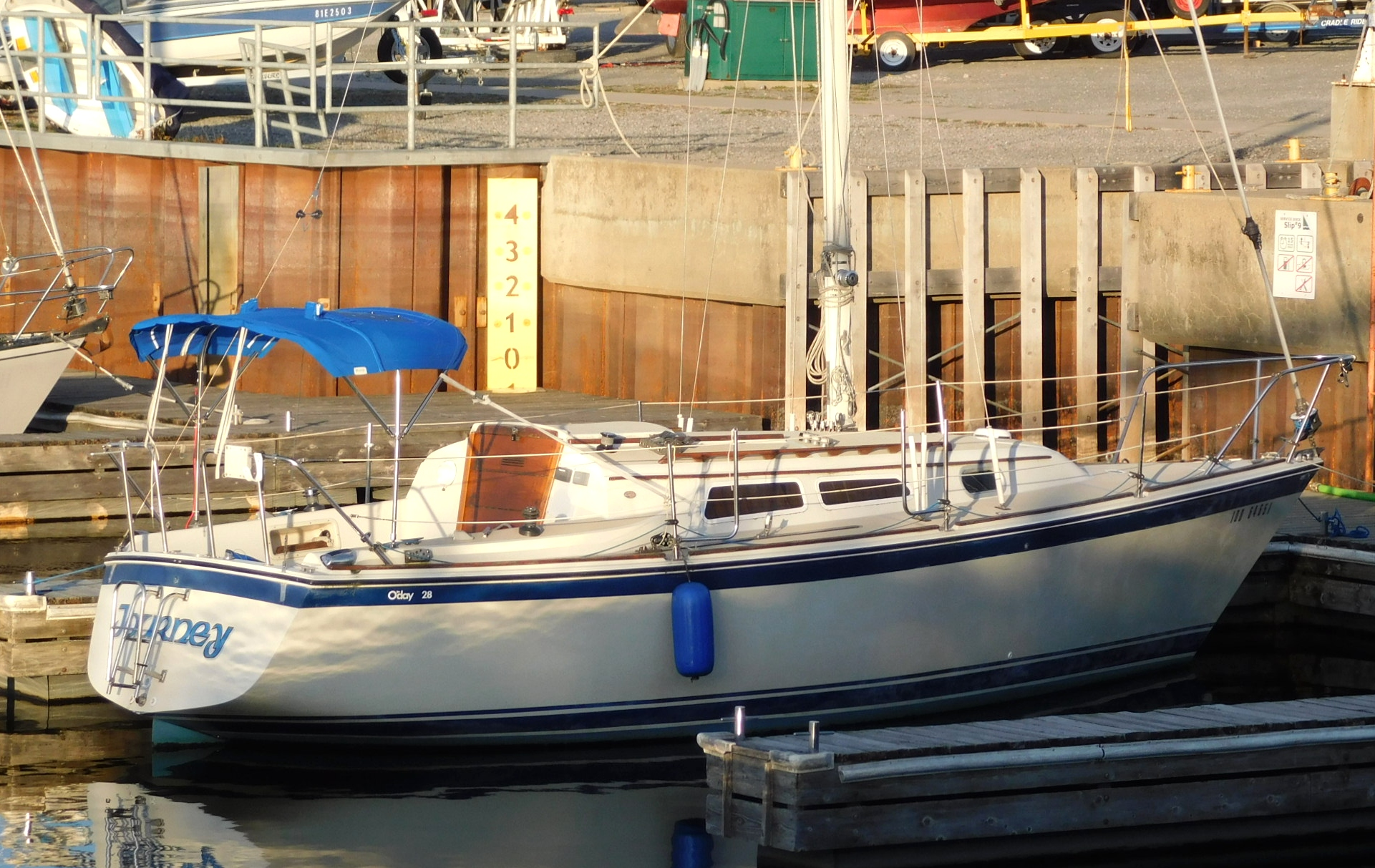
O'Day 28

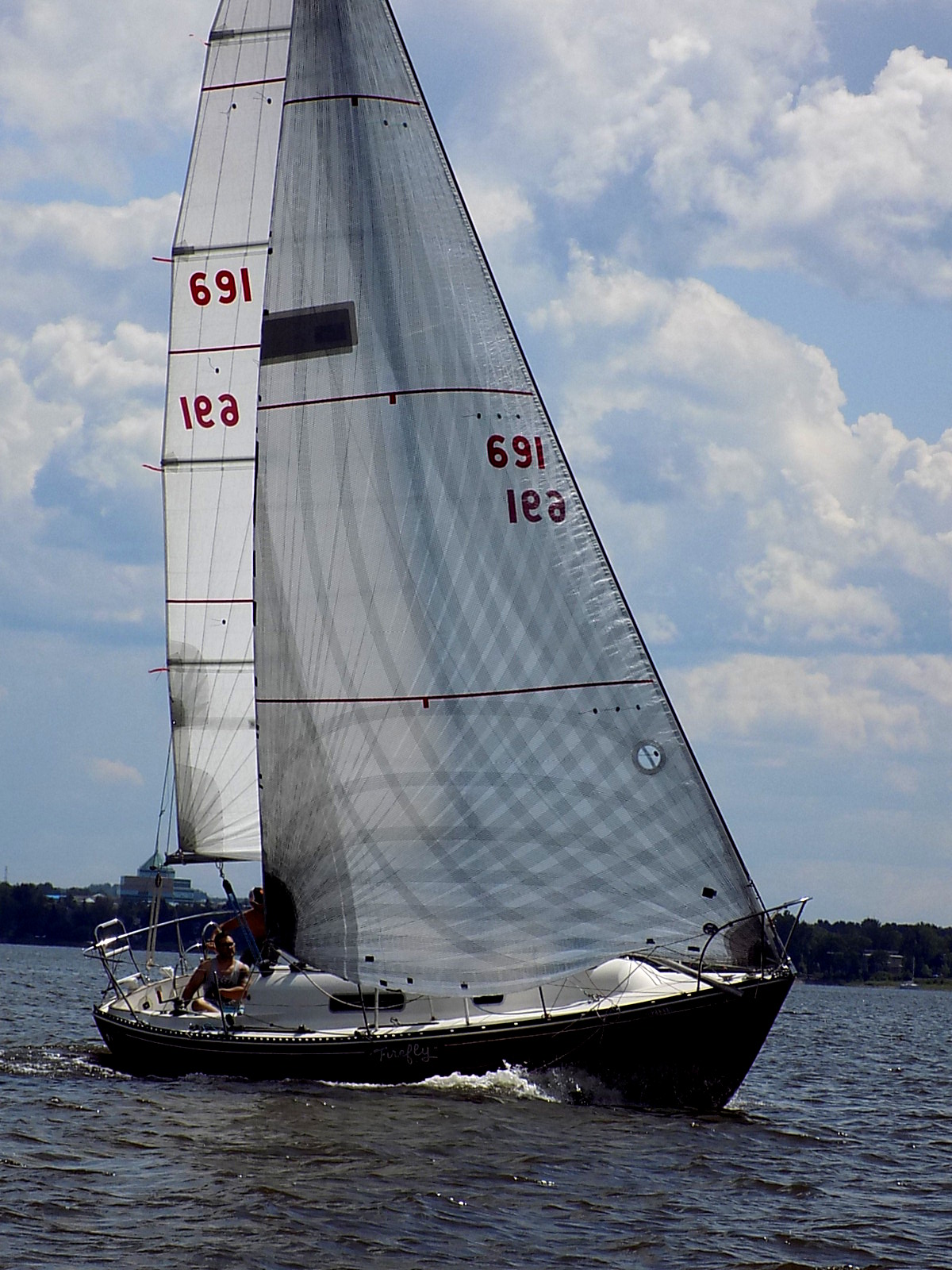
O'Day 28

The O'Day 28 is a small recreational keelboat, built predominantly of fiberglass, with wood trim. It has a masthead sloop rig, a raked stem, a slightly reverse transom, an internally-mounted spade-type rudder controlled by a wheel and a fixed fin keel or centerboard. It displaces 7,300 lb (3,311 kg) and carries 2,550 lb (1,157 kg) of ballast. Starting with serial number 323, produced in 1980, the boats displace 7,450 lb (3,379 kg) and have a slightly shorter waterline length.

The keel-equipped version of the boat has a draft of 4.50 ft (1.37 m), while the centerboard-equipped version has a draft of 6.83 ft (2.08 m) with the centerboard extended and 3.25 ft (0.99 m) with it retracted, allowing beaching or ground transportation on a trailer. In later production the centerboard version was replaced by a shoal draft keel model with a draft of 3.67 ft (1.12 m). A deep keel version was also produced with a draft of 4.67 ft (1.42 m). There was also a tall mast version, with a mast about 2.00 ft (0.61 m) higher.

The boat is fitted with a Universal 12 10 hp (7 kW) diesel engine. The fuel tank holds 18 U.S. gallons (68 L; 15 imp gal) and the fresh water tank has a capacity of 25 U.S. gallons (95 L; 21 imp gal).

The design has a hull speed of 6.42 kn (11.89 km/h). Serial numbers starting with 323 have a hull speed of 6.39 kn (11.83 km/h).

== See also ==
- List of sailing boat types

Similar sailboats

- Alerion Express 28
- Aloha 28
- Beneteau First 285
- Beneteau Oceanis 281
- Bristol Channel Cutter
- Cal 28
- Catalina 28
- Crown 28
- Cumulus 28
- Grampian 28
- Hunter 28
- Hunter 28.5
- Hunter 280
- J/28
- Laser 28
- Pearson 28
- Sabre 28
- Sea Sprite 27
- Sirius 28
- Tanzer 8.5
- Tanzer 28
- TES 28 Magnam
- Viking 28
