= Viking 28 =

Sailboat class

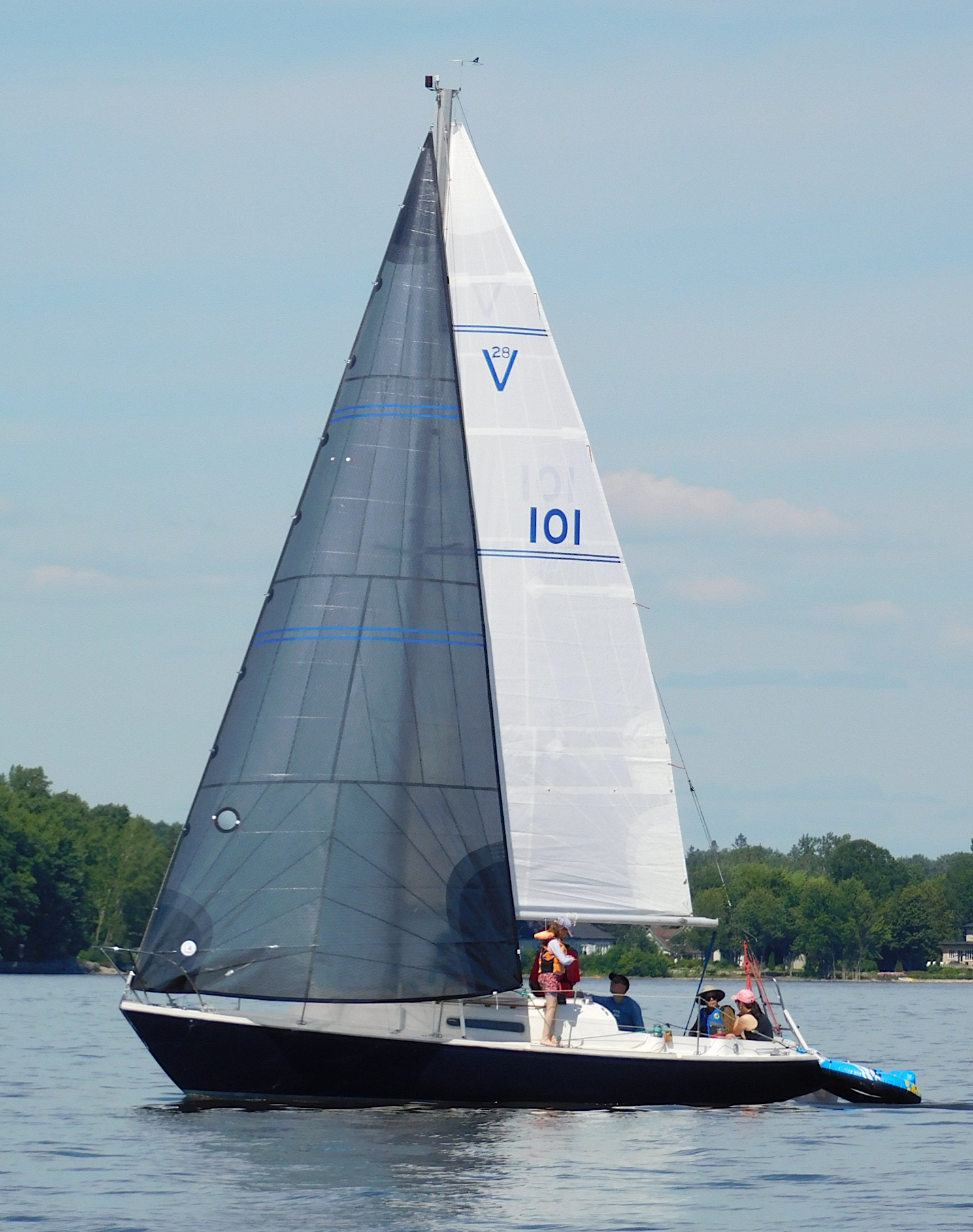

Development
- Designer: Cuthbertson & Cassian
- Location: Canada
- Year: 1968
- No. built: 147 (plus 70 Trapper 28/400)
- Builder: Ontario Yachts
- Name: Viking 28

Boat
- Displacement: 4,775 lb (2,166 kg)
- Draft: 4.50 ft (1.37 m)

Hull
- Type: Monohull
- Construction: Fiberglass
- LOA: 28.17 ft (8.59 m)
- LWL: 22.00 ft (6.71 m)
- Beam: 8.37 ft (2.55 m)
- Engine: Vire Engines two-stroke gasoline inboard engine 7 hp (5 kW) or an outboard motor

Hull appendages
- Keel: fin keel
- Ballast: 2,250 lb (1,021 kg)
- Rudder: internally-mounted spade-type rudder

Rig
- General: Masthead sloop
- I foretriangle height: 32.30 ft (9.85 m)
- J foretriangle base: 10.50 ft (3.20 m)
- P mainsail luff: 27.30 ft (8.32 m)
- E mainsail foot: 10.80 ft (3.29 m)

Sails
- Mainsail area: 147.42 sq ft (13.696 m^{2})
- Jib/genoa area: 169.58 sq ft (15.754 m^{2})
- Total sail area: 317.00 sq ft (29.450 m^{2})

Racing
- PHRF: 186 (average)

The Viking 28 is a Canadian sailboat, that was designed by Cuthbertson & Cassian and first built in 1968.

== Production ==
The boat was built by Ontario Yachts in Burlington, Ontario, Canada, between 1968 and 1983, with 147 examples completed. Initial production was in the form of a kit for amateur construction, but later many were professionally built.

The Viking 28 design was also built in England by Anesty Yachts as the Trapper 28/400, with 70 completed.

== Design ==
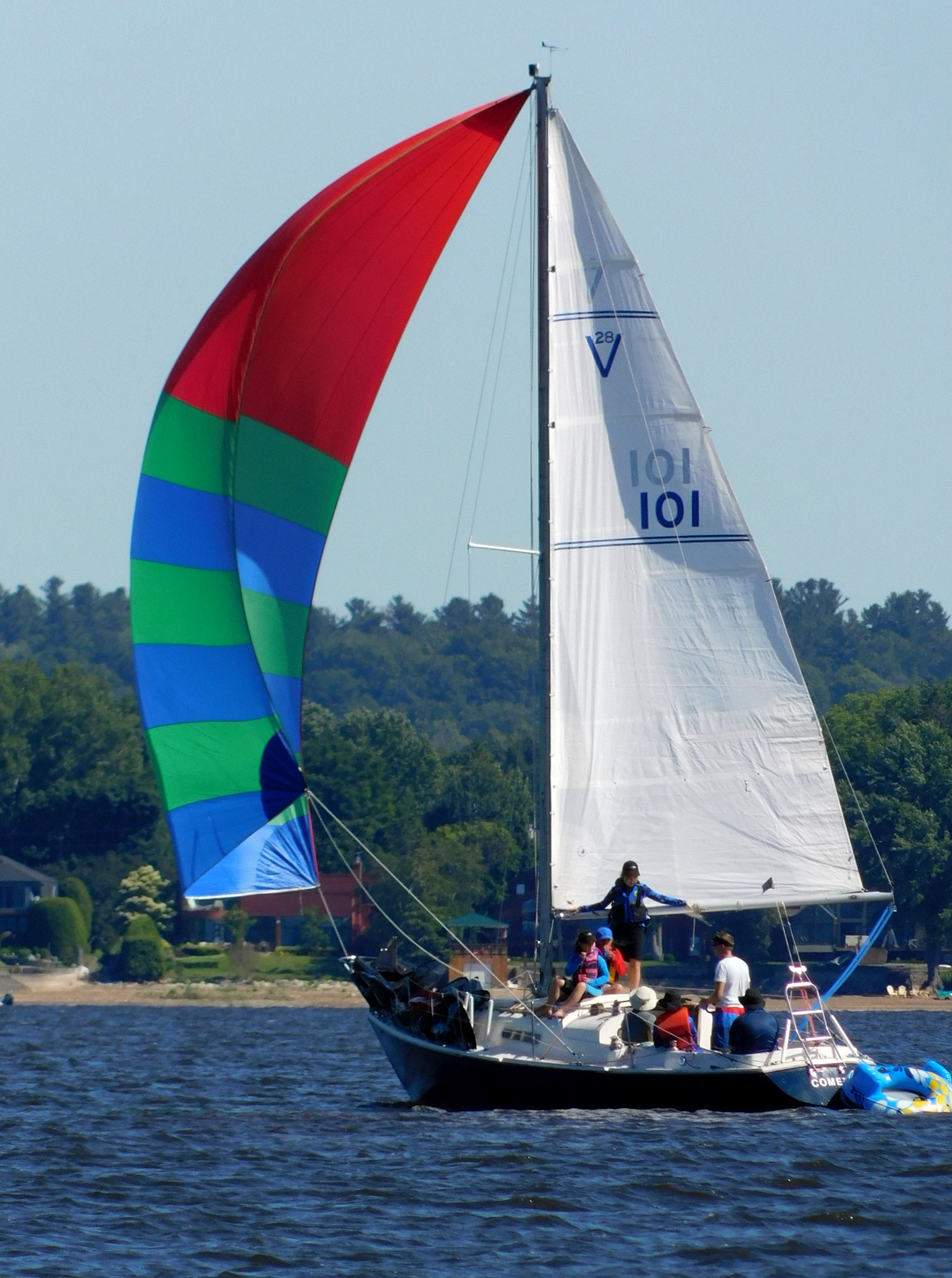
Viking 28, sailing with spinnaker flying.

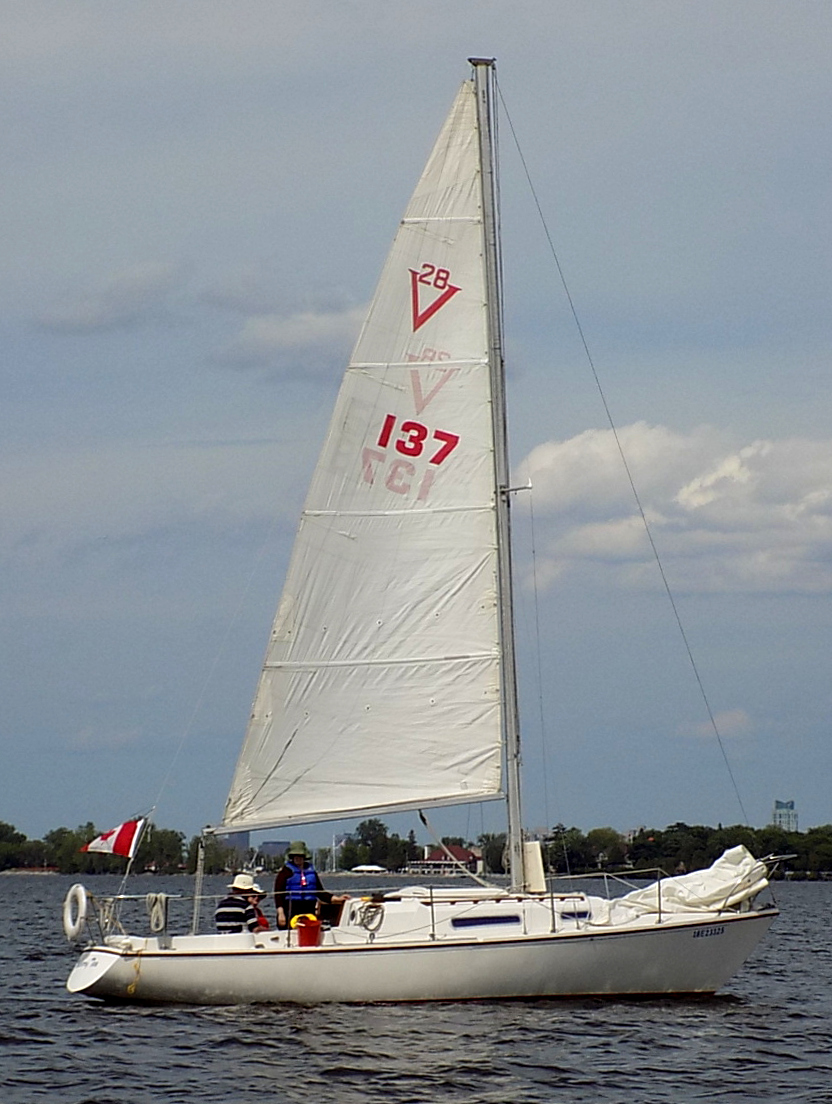
Viking 28 sailing under mainsail only

The Viking 28 was the first boat designed by Cuthbertson & Cassian to be produced by Ontario Yachts.

The Viking 28 is a small recreational keelboat, built predominantly of fiberglass, with wood trim. It has a masthead sloop rig, an internally-mounted spade-type rudder and a fixed fin keel. It displaces 4,775 lb (2,166 kg) and carries 2,250 lb (1,021 kg) of ballast.

The boat has a draft of 4.50 ft (1.37 m) with the standard keel fitted. It is fitted with a Vire Engines two-stroke gasoline inboard engine of 7 hp (5 kW) or a well-mounted outboard motor.

Many modifications were incorporated in 1974, including a wider companionway, with a pop-up hatch, plus a modified mast step and V-berth to make the hull stronger.

The boat has a PHRF racing average handicap of 186 with a high of 189 and low of 183. It has a hull speed of 6.29 kn (11.65 km/h).

== Operational history ==
In a review Michael McGoldrick wrote, "The Viking 28 is a fast, relatively light weight boat that was designed by C&C and built by Ontario Yachts. Its cabin does not have standing headroom, which is something of an oddity for a modern production 28 footer. On the other hand, this meant there was no need to incorporate a high freeboard, or otherwise compromise the lines of this design, in order to accommodate for standing headroom in this boat. As a well known British designer (Uffa Fox) once said, "If you want to stand up, go on deck"."

== See also ==
- List of sailing boat types

Similar sailboats

- Alerion Express 28
- Aloha 28
- Beneteau First 285
- Beneteau Oceanis 281
- Bristol Channel Cutter
- Cal 28
- Catalina 28
- Cumulus 28
- Grampian 28
- Hunter 28
- Hunter 28.5
- Hunter 280
- J/28
- O'Day 28
- Pearson 28
- Sabre 28
- Sea Sprite 27
- Sirius 28
- Tanzer 8.5
- Tanzer 28
- TES 28 Magnam
