= Sabre 28 =

Sailboat class

Sabre 28-1
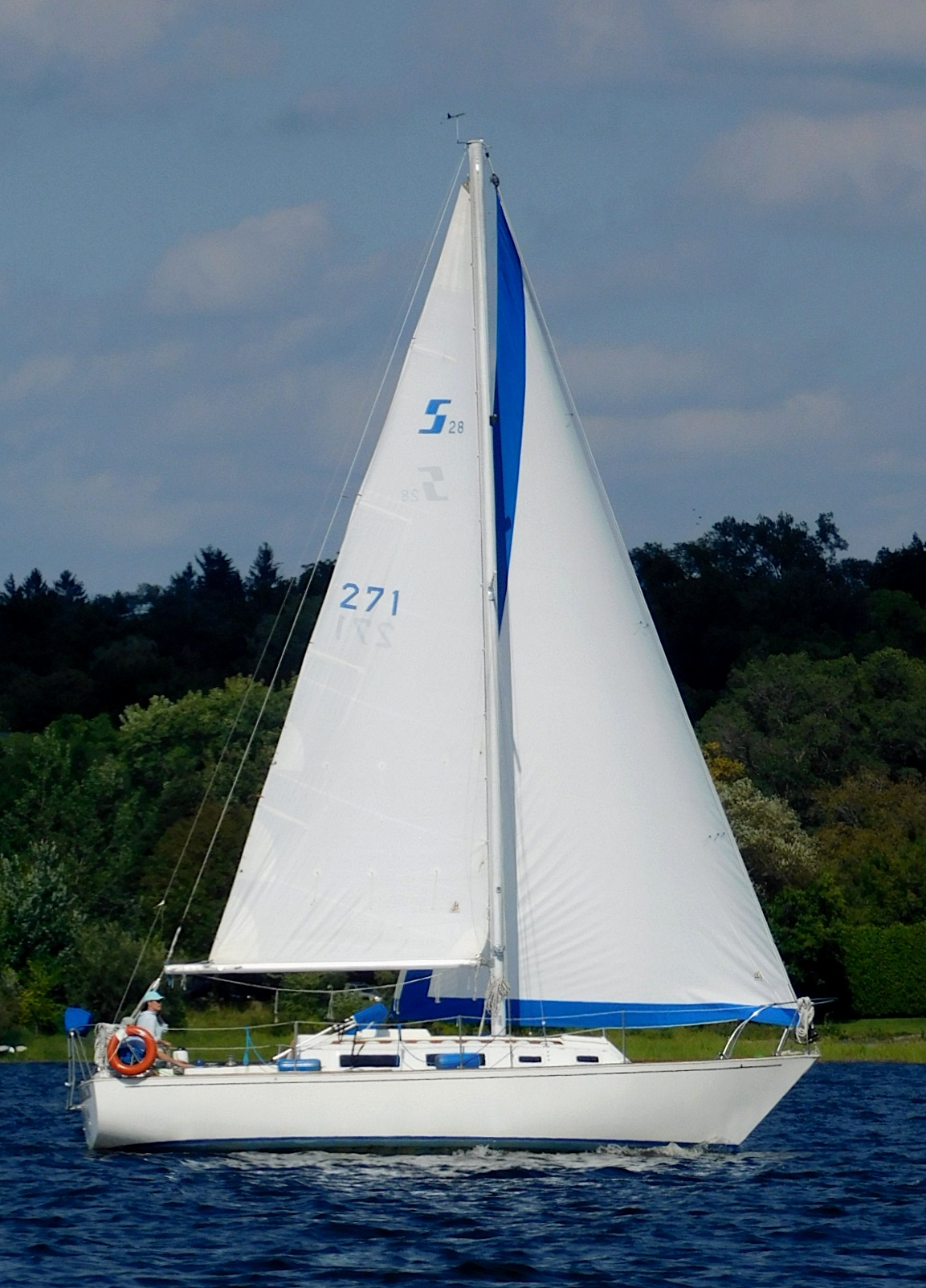

Development
- Designer: Roger Hewson
- Location: United States
- Year: 1971
- No. built: 199
- Builder: Sabre Yachts
- Name: Sabre 28-1

Boat
- Displacement: 7,400 lb (3,357 kg)
- Draft: 4.33 ft (1.32 m)

Hull
- Type: Monohull
- Construction: Fiberglass
- LOA: 28.00 ft (8.53 m)
- LWL: 22.83 ft (6.96 m)
- Beam: 9.17 ft (2.80 m)
- Engine: Universal Atomic 4 30 hp (22 kW) gasoline engine

Hull appendages
- Keel: swept fin keel
- Ballast: 2,900 lb (1,315 kg)
- Rudder: sskeg-mounted rudder

Rig
- Rig type: Bermuda rig
- I foretriangle height: 36.20 ft (11.03 m)
- J foretriangle base: 11.80 ft (3.60 m)
- P mainsail luff: 30.90 ft (9.42 m)
- E mainsail foot: 11.60 ft (3.54 m)

Sails
- Sailplan: Masthead sloop
- Mainsail area: 179.22 sq ft (16.650 m^{2})
- Jib/genoa area: 213.58 sq ft (19.842 m^{2})
- Total sail area: 392.80 sq ft (36.492 m^{2})

The Sabre 28 is a series of American sailboats, designed by Roger Hewson and first built in 1971.

== Production ==
The boat was built in three versions by Sabre Yachts in the United States between 1971 and 1986, with a total of 588 built.

== Design ==
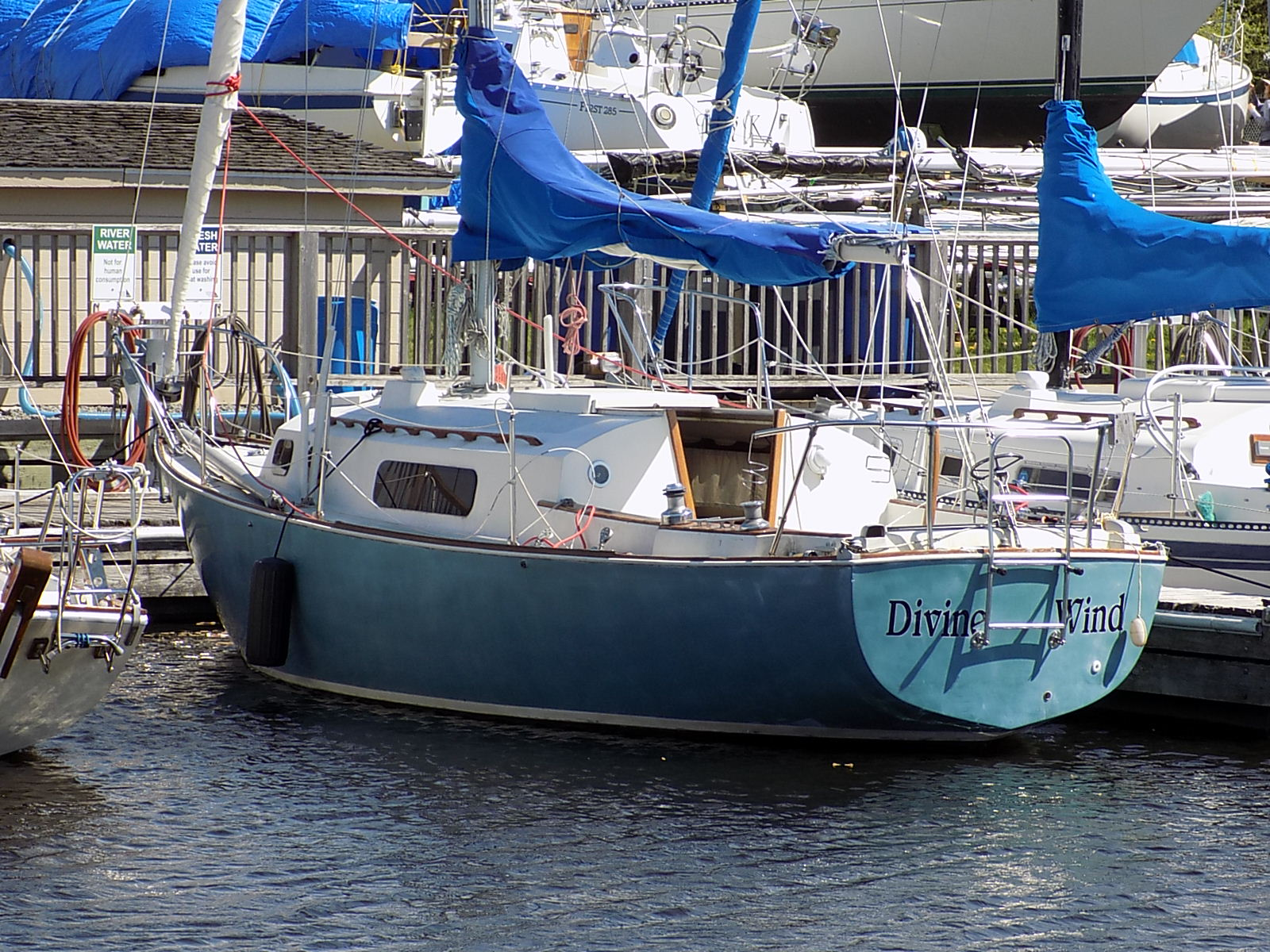
Sabre 28, transom view

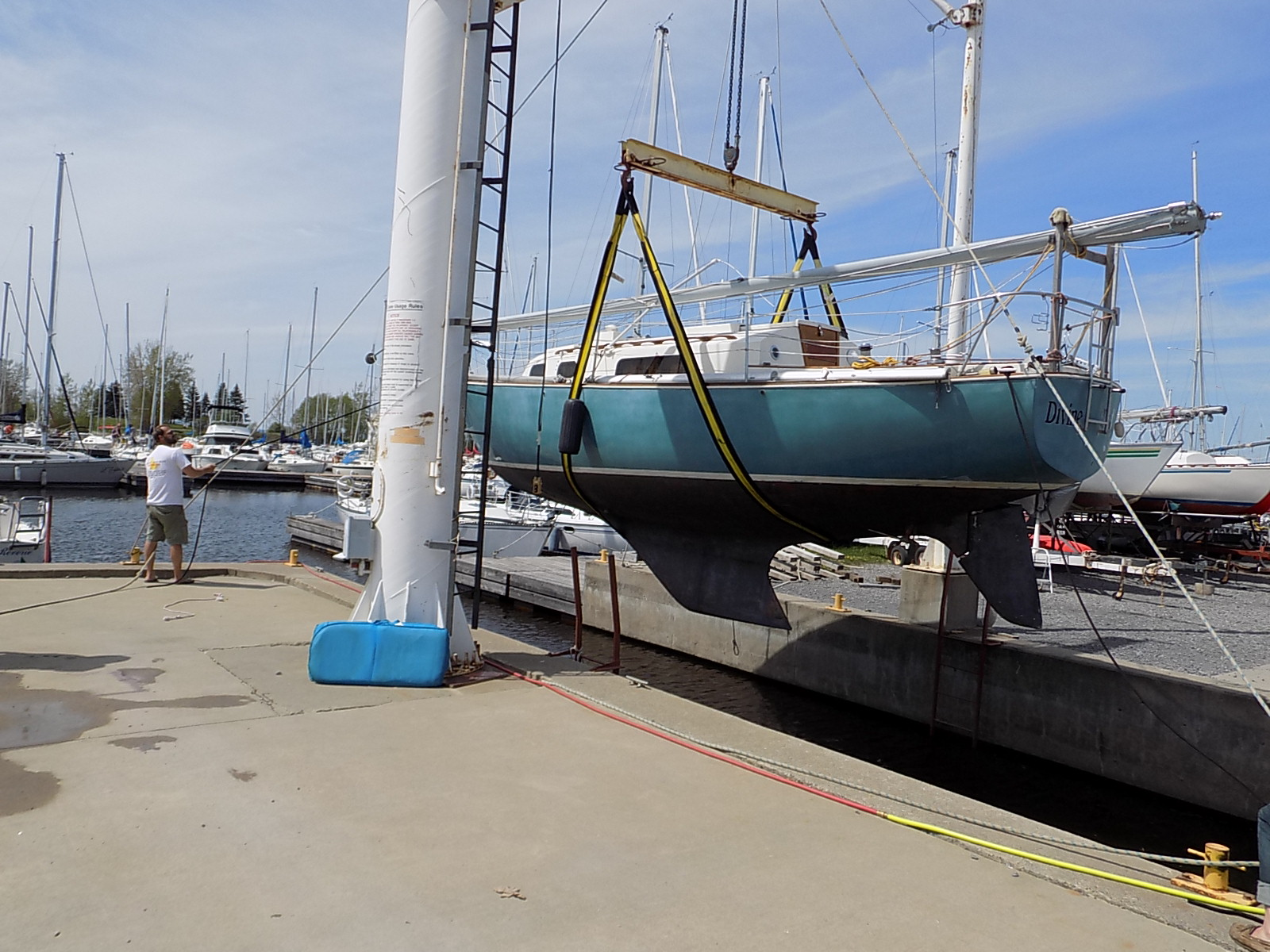
Sabre 28 being launched on a crane hoist, showing the keel and rudder arrangement

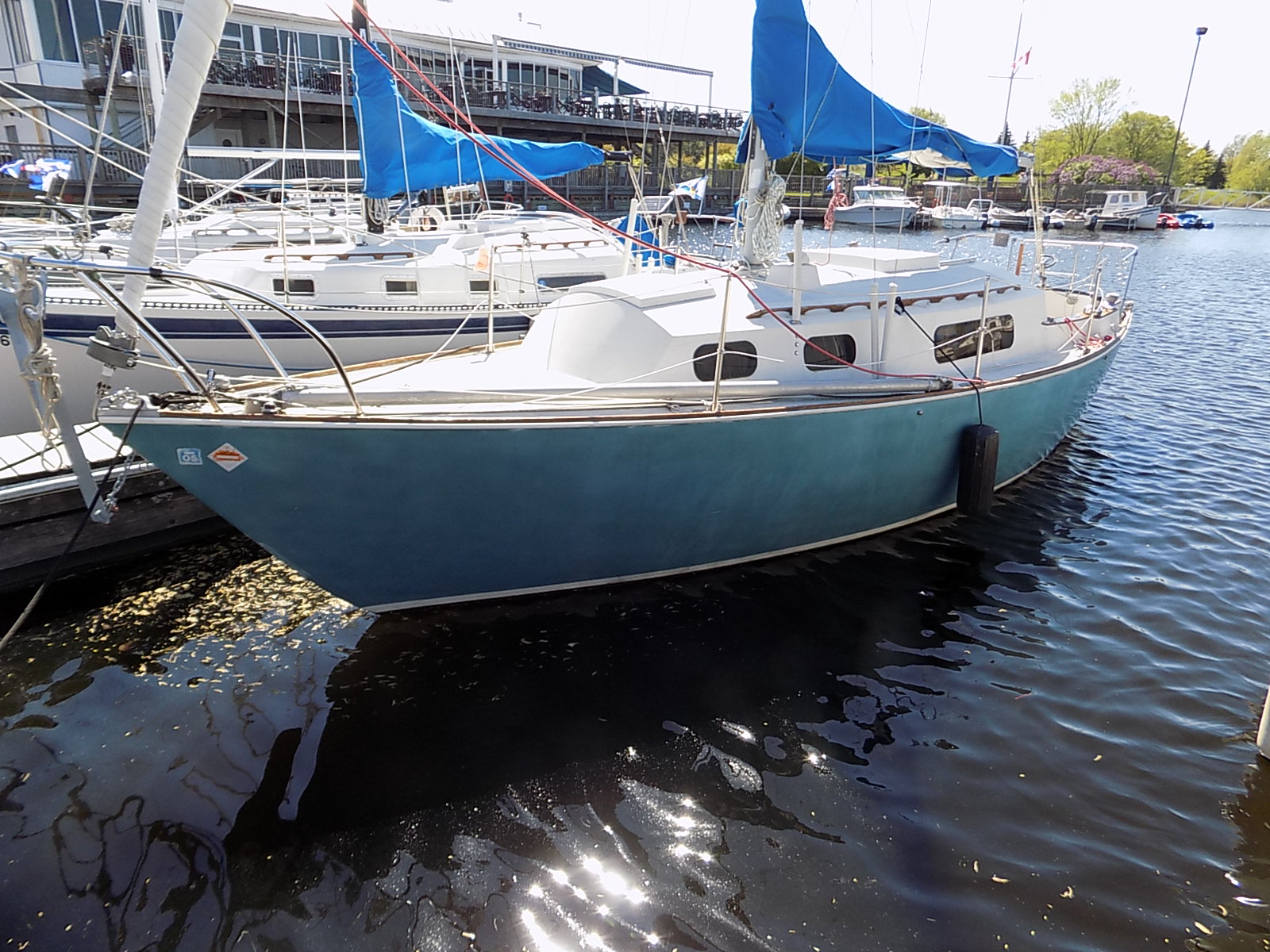
Sabre 28, bow view

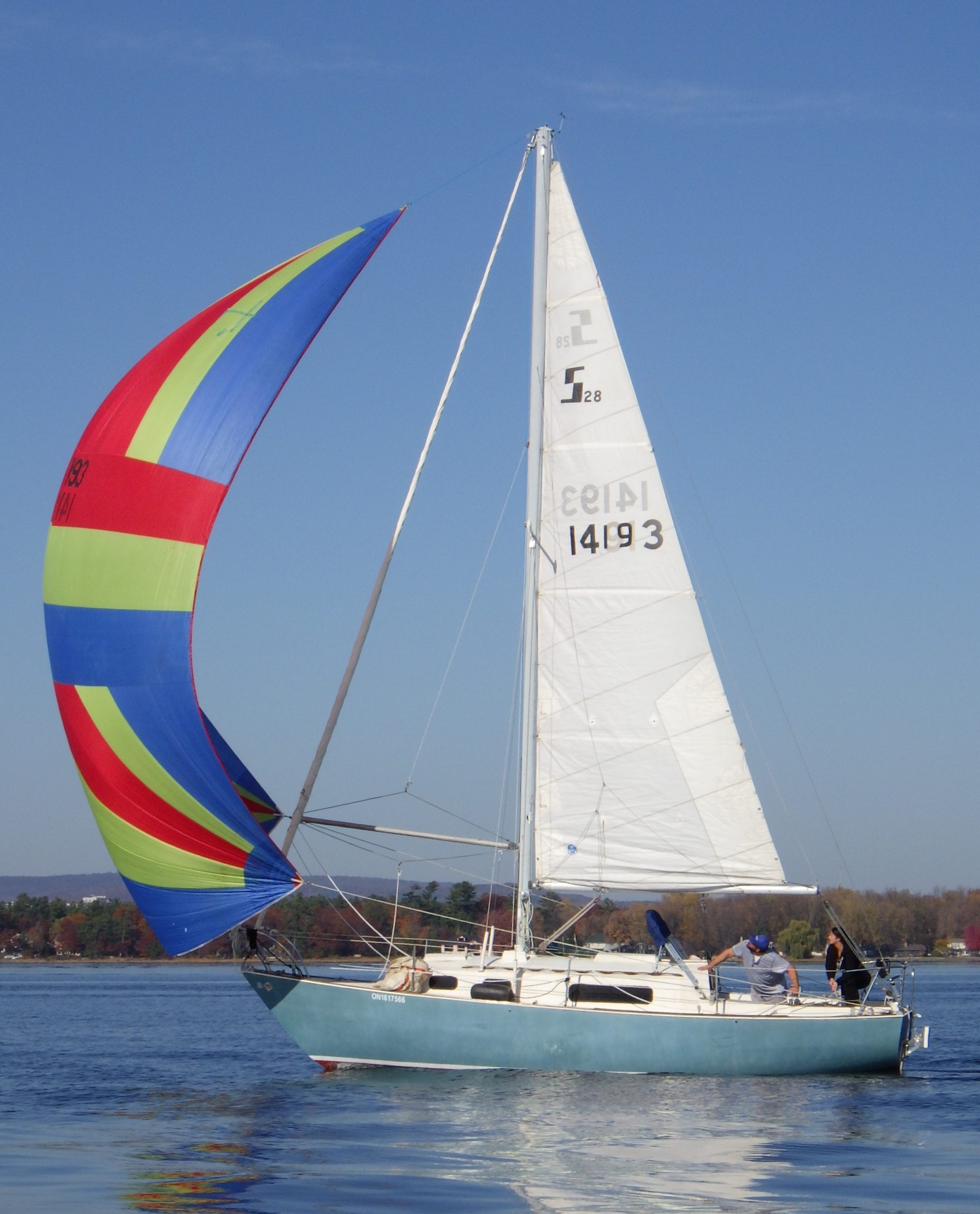
Sabre 28, flying its spinnaker

The Sabre 28 was the first design for the newly-formed company. Its design goal was to build the finest 28-foot sailing yacht available, using the state of the art materials and techniques available at the time and construct the boat on a modern assembly line basis, to realize good economy and production quality.

The Sabre 28 is a small recreational keelboat, built predominantly of fiberglass, with extensive teak wood trim. It has a masthead sloop rig, a raked stem, vertical transom, skeg-mounted rudder controlled by a ship's wheel and a swept fixed fin keel.

The accommodations include a double "V" berth in the forward cabin, single and double bunks in the main cabin, and a quarter berth. The forward cabin has a door for privacy. The head includes a hanging locker and a dorade vent. The main cabin has a folding table that stows against a bulkhead. The galley features a recessed stove.

The cockpit is over 7 ft (2.1 m) in length. The foredeck mounts an anchor locker. Other features include a foredeck hatch, four opening and four fixed ports, internal halyards for both the mainsail and the genoa, raised by a mast-mounted winch. The mainsheet traveler is mounted on the cabin roof and genoa tracks are provided. The genoa is controlled with dual two-speed winches, mounted on the cockpit coaming.

All models have hull speeds of 6.4 kn (11.85 km/h).

== Variants ==
Sabre 28-1 (serial numbers 1–211)
This model was introduced in 1971 and produced until 1976, with 199 built. Eight were built with ketch rigs. It has a length overall of 28.00 ft (8.5 m), a waterline length of 22.83 ft (7.0 m), displaces 7,400 lb (3,357 kg) and carries 2,900 lb (1,315 kg) of ballast. The boat has a draft of 4.33 ft (1.32 m) with the standard keel and 3.8 ft (1.2 m) with the optional shoal draft keel. Universal Atomic 4 30 hp (22 kW) gasoline engine. The fuel tank holds 20 U.S. gallons (76 L; 17 imp gal) and the fresh water tank has a capacity of 30 U.S. gallons (110 L; 25 imp gal). The shoal draft version has a PHRF racing average handicap of 201 with a high of 210 and low of 195.
Sabre 28-2 (serial numbers 212–539)
This model was introduced in 1976 and produced until 1982, with 320 built. It has a length overall of 28.42 ft (8.7 m), a waterline length of 22.83 ft (7.0 m) and displaces 7,900 lb (3,583 kg). The boat has a draft of 4.30 ft (1.31 m) with the standard keel fitted. The boat has a PHRF racing average handicap of 201 with a high of 205 and low of 198. It has a hull speed of 6.4 kn (11.85 km/h).
Sabre 28-3 (serial numbers 540–588)
This model was introduced in 1983 and produced until 1986. It has a length overall of 28.42 ft (8.7 m), a waterline length of 22.83 ft (7.0 m) and displaces 7,900 lb (3,583 kg). The boat has a draft of 4.67 ft (1.42 m) with the standard keel fitted. The boat has a PHRF racing average handicap of 186 with a high of 189 and low of 183. It has a hull speed of 6.4 kn (11.85 km/h).

== American Sailboat Hall of Fame ==
The Sabre 28 was inducted into the now-defunct Sail America American Sailboat Hall of Fame in 2003. In honoring the design, the hall cited, "If Roger Hewson and his associates at Sabre Yachts hadn’t hit a sweet spot with the 28 – bringing the look and feel of a yacht into the pocket-cruiser size range – they wouldn’t have had a 15-year production run, nor gone on to build close to 2000 larger sail and power boats. Perhaps the truest testimony to their success in crafting a boat of lasting quality is the price a 28 fetches on the used boat market today. Depending on maintenance and updates, prices can range from $15,000 to $30,000. As Hornor writes, “The Sabre 28 is rather high priced for its size and accommodations. However, the boat has proven to be a good investment due to its ability to attract buyers willing to pay a little more”"

== See also ==
- List of sailing boat types
- Sabre 38

Similar sailboats

- Alerion Express 28
- Aloha 28
- Beneteau First 285
- Beneteau Oceanis 281
- Bristol Channel Cutter
- Cal 28
- Catalina 28
- Crown 28
- Cumulus 28
- Grampian 28
- Hunter 28
- Hunter 28.5
- Hunter 280
- J/28
- Laser 28
- O'Day 28
- Pearson 28
- Sea Sprite 27
- Sirius 28
- Tanzer 28
- Tanzer 8.5
- TES 28 Magnam
- Viking 28
