= Hunter 28.5 =

Sailboat class

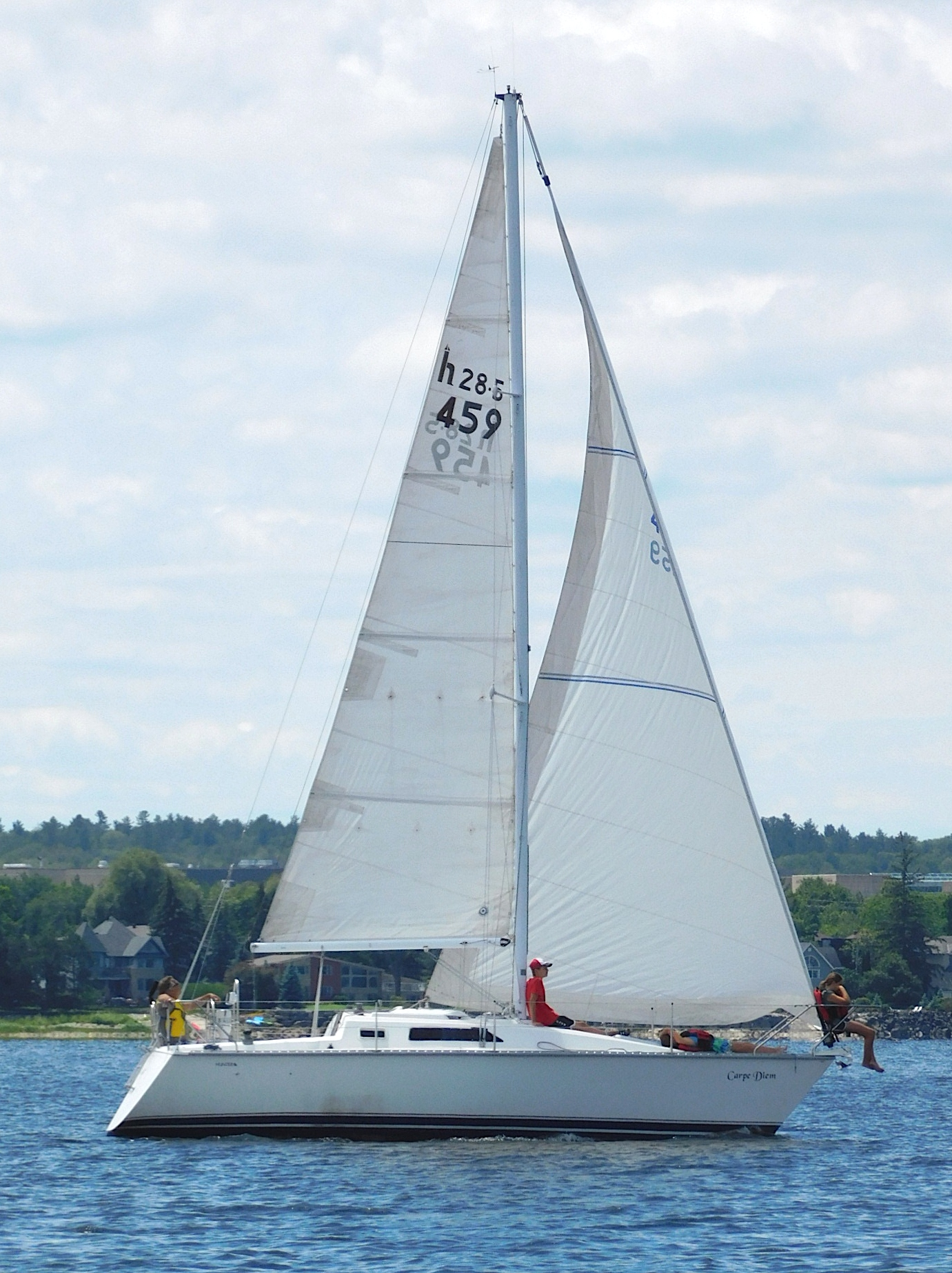

Development
- Designer: Hunter Design Team
- Location: United States
- Year: 1985
- Builder: Hunter Marine
- Name: Hunter 28.5

Boat
- Displacement: 7,000 lb (3,175 kg)
- Draft: 5.18 ft (1.58 m)

Hull
- Type: Monohull
- Construction: Fiberglass
- LOA: 28.42 ft (8.66 m)
- LWL: 23.75 ft (7.24 m)
- Beam: 10.50 ft (3.20 m)
- Engine: Diesel inboard motor

Hull appendages
- Keel: fin keel
- Ballast: 3,000 lb (1,361 kg)
- Rudder: internally-mounted spade-type rudder

Rig
- Rig type: Bermuda rig
- I foretriangle height: 37.33 ft (11.38 m)
- J foretriangle base: 12.08 ft (3.68 m)
- P mainsail luff: 31.75 ft (9.68 m)
- E mainsail foot: 10.83 ft (3.30 m)

Sails
- Sailplan: B&R rigged sloop
- Mainsail area: 225.47 sq ft (20.947 m^{2})
- Jib/genoa area: 171.93 sq ft (15.973 m^{2})
- Total sail area: 397.40 sq ft (36.920 m^{2})

The Hunter 28.5 is an American sailboat that was designed by the Hunter Design Team and first built in 1985.

The Hunter 28.5 was developed into the Hunter 28 in 1989.

== Production ==
The design was built by Hunter Marine in the United States between 1985 and 1988, but it is now out of production.

== Design ==
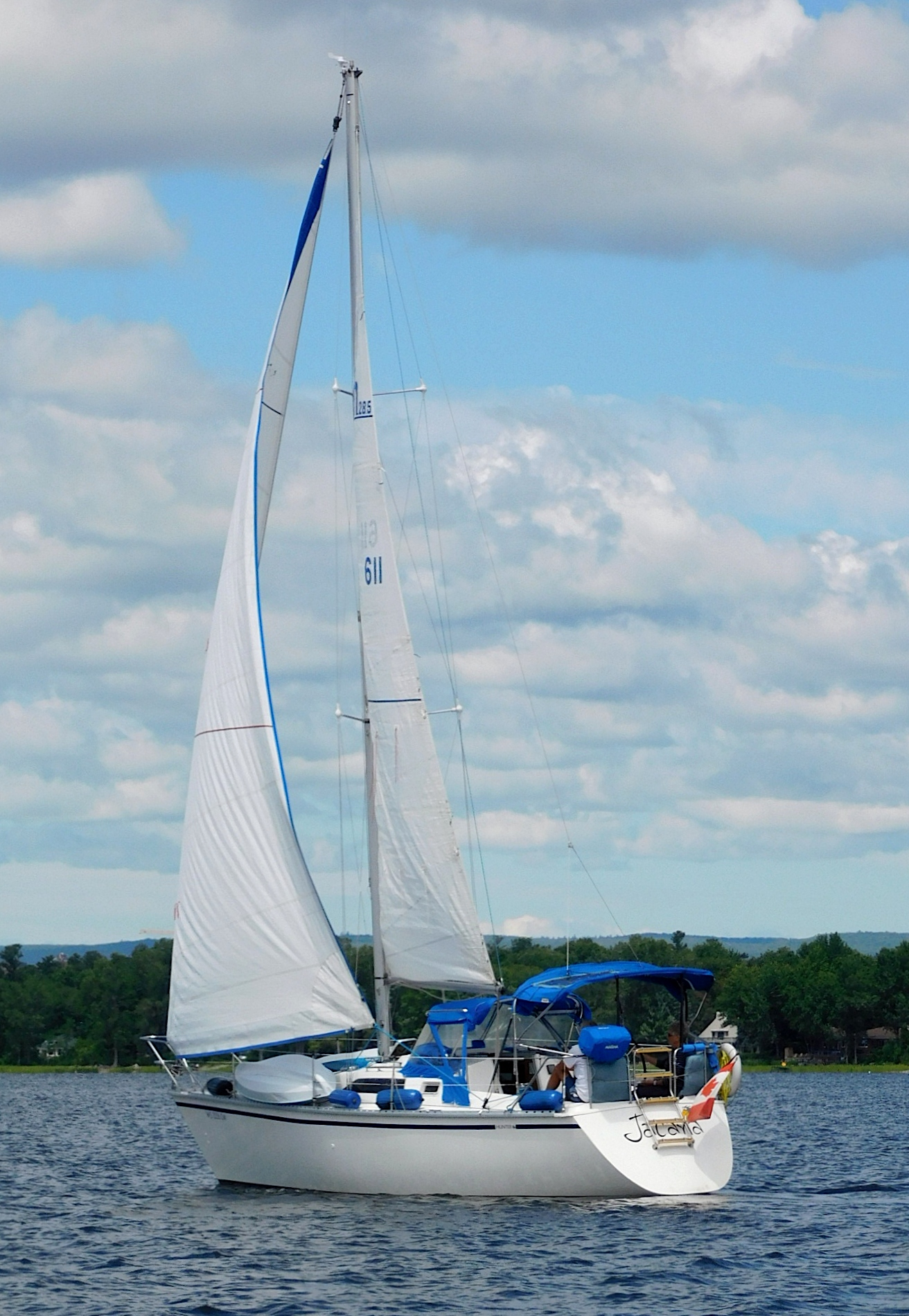
Hunter 28.5

The Hunter 28.5 is a recreational keelboat, built predominantly of fiberglass, with wood trim. It is a B&R rigged sloop with a split backstay, with a raked stem, a reverse transom, an internally-mounted spade-type rudder controlled by a wheel and a fixed fin keel or shoal draft wing keel. The fin keel version displaces 7,000 lb (3,175 kg) and carries 3,000 lb (1,361 kg) of ballast, while the wing keel version displaces 7,100 lb (3,221 kg) and carries 3,100 lb (1,406 kg) of ballast.

The boat has a draft of 5.18 ft (1.58 m) with the standard keel and 4.00 ft (1.22 m) with the optional shoal draft wing keel.

The boat is fitted with an inboard diesel engine. The fuel tank holds 11 U.S. gallons (42 L; 9.2 imp gal) and the fresh water tank has a capacity of 27 U.S. gallons (100 L; 22 imp gal).

The factory-supplied standard equipment included a 110% genoa, two self-tailing two-speed jib sheet winches, double lifelines, a teak and holly cabin sole, dinette table, navigation table, stainless steel sink, hot and cold pressurized water system, a two-burner stove, an icebox, an anchor and life jackets. A spinnaker was a factory option.

The design has a hull speed of 6.53 kn (12.09 km/h). The wing keel version has a PHRF racing average handicap of 180 with a high of 192 and low of 171.

== See also ==
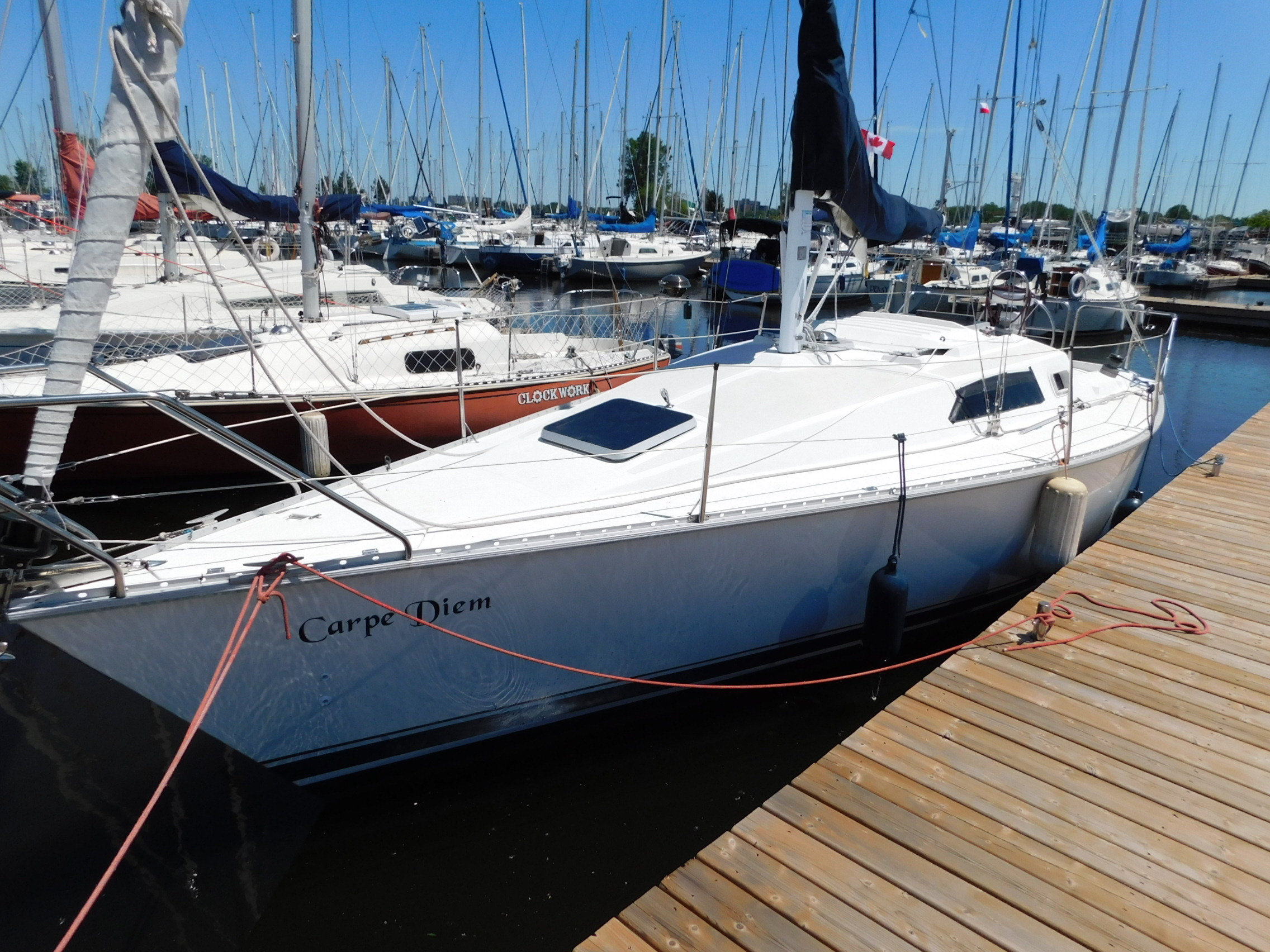
Hunter 28.5

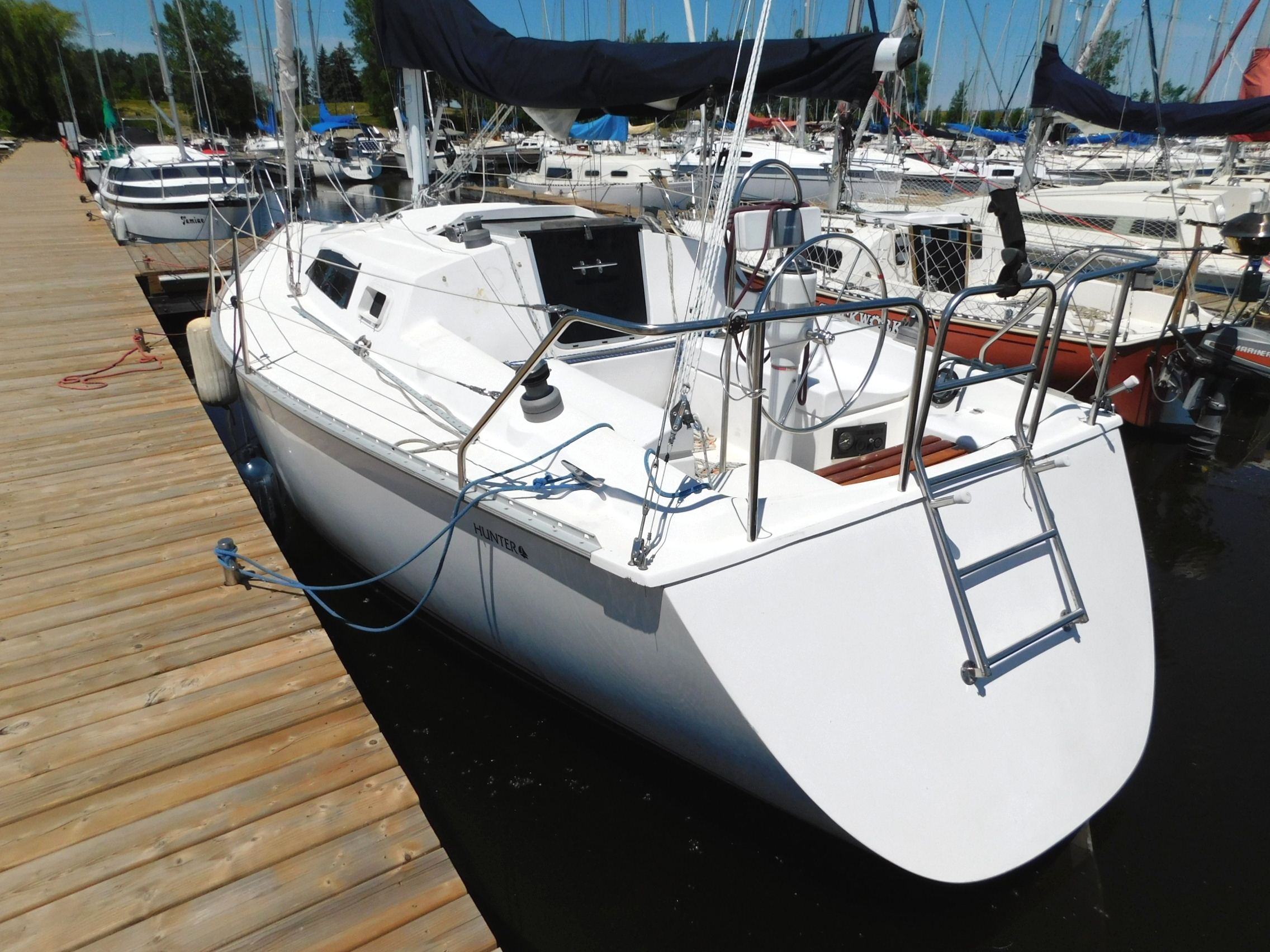
Hunter 28.5, showing the reverse transom

- List of sailing boat types

Similar sailboats

- Alerion Express 28
- Aloha 28
- Beneteau First 285
- Cal 28
- Catalina 28
- Cumulus 28
- Grampian 28
- Hunter 28
- J/28
- O'Day 28
- Pearson 28
- Sabre 28
- Sea Sprite 27
- Sirius 28
- Tanzer 28
- TES 28 Magnam
- Viking 28
