= Hunter 28 =

Sailboat class

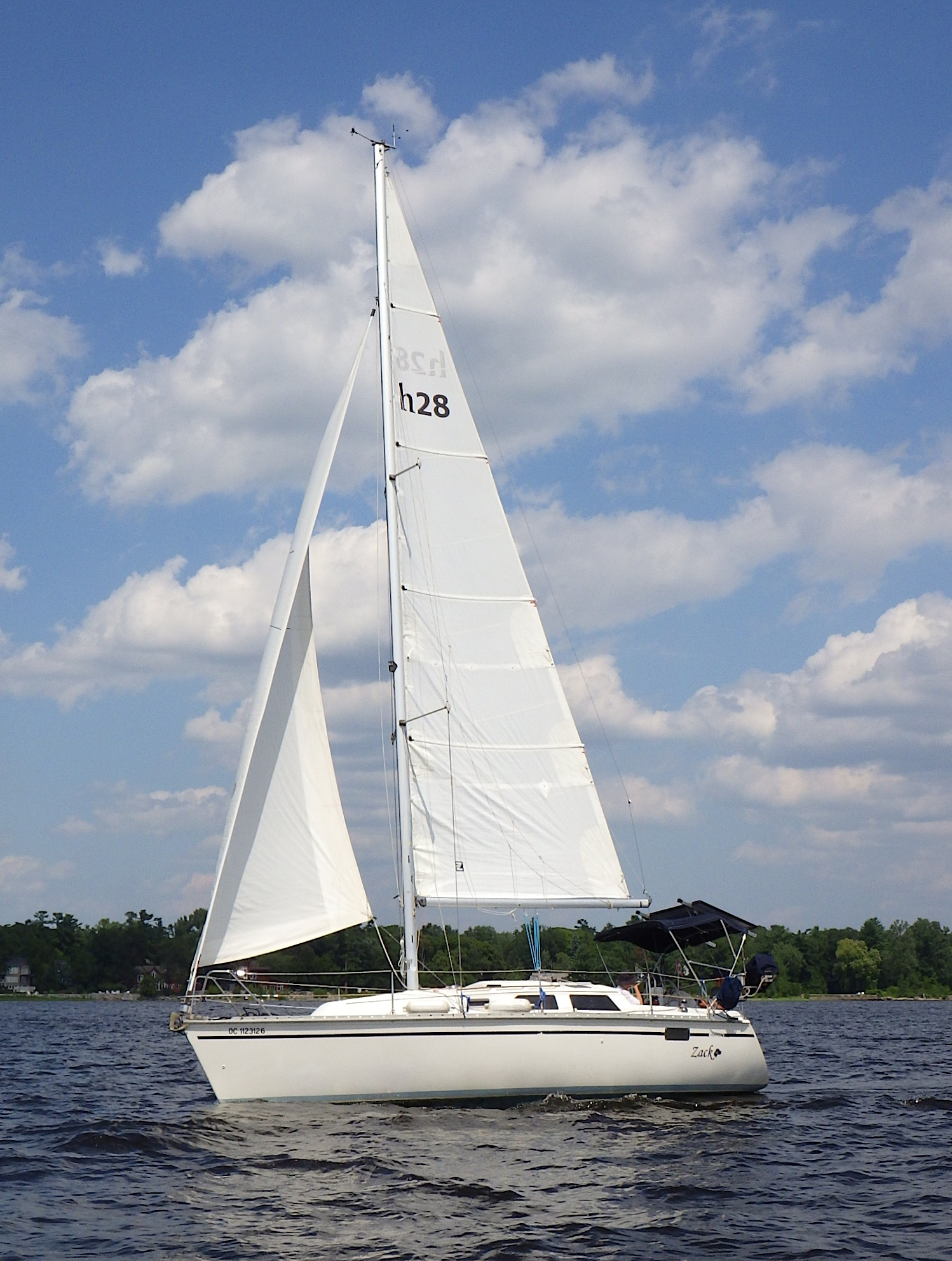

Development
- Location: United States
- Year: 1989
- Builder: Hunter Marine
- Name: Hunter 28

Boat
- Displacement: 7,400 lb (3,357 kg)
- Draft: 3.75 ft (1.14 m)

Hull
- Type: Monohull
- Construction: Fiberglass
- LOA: 28.01 ft (8.54 m)
- LWL: 24.17 ft (7.37 m)
- Beam: 10.50 ft (3.20 m)
- Engine: Yanmar 18 hp (13 kW) diesel engine

Hull appendages
- Keel: wing keel
- Ballast: 2,800 lb (1,270 kg)
- Rudder: internally-mounted spade-type rudder

Rig
- Rig type: Bermuda rig
- I foretriangle height: 35.00 ft (10.67 m)
- J foretriangle base: 10.50 ft (3.20 m)
- P mainsail luff: 37.50 ft (11.43 m)
- E mainsail foot: 11.50 ft (3.51 m)

Sails
- Sailplan: Fractional rigged sloop
- Mainsail area: 215.63 sq ft (20.033 m^{2})
- Jib/genoa area: 183.75 sq ft (17.071 m^{2})
- Total sail area: 399.38 sq ft (37.104 m^{2})

The Hunter 28 is an American sailboat that was designed as a racer-cruiser and first built in 1989.

The Hunter 28 is a development of the 1985 Hunter 28.5.

== Production ==
The design was built by Hunter Marine in the United States between 1989 and 1994, but it is now out of production.

== Design ==
The Hunter 28 is a recreational keelboat, built predominantly of fiberglass. It has a fractional sloop rig, a raked stem, a reverse transom, an internally-mounted spade-type rudder controlled by a wheel and a fixed wing keel. It displaces 7,400 lb (3,357 kg) and carries 2,800 lb (1,270 kg) of ballast.

The boat has a draft of 3.75 ft (1.14 m) with the standard wing keel fitted.

The boat is fitted with a Japanese Yanmar diesel engine of 18 hp (13 kW) Universal Atomic 4. The fuel tank holds 18 U.S. gallons (68 L; 15 imp gal) and the fresh water tank has a capacity of 30 U.S. gallons (110 L; 25 imp gal).

The design has a hull speed of 6.59 kn (12.20 km/h).

== Operational history ==
Marine surveyor David Pascoe wrote a scathing review of the design in 1998, criticizing the aft cabin, the head design, dinette, the reverse transom and swim platform, rigging dimensions, deck hatch, cockpit dimensions with regard to the wheel size and placement, winch mounting, lack of cockpit back support, the keel design, fiberglass quality and the engine mounts. In concluding he writes, "This could have been a nice, well-made boat. Parts of it are, but the builder didn't have his priorities straight. If all you're going to do is sail around the pond on balmy days, its probably fine for that. A serious deep water sailor she's not. This is a price boat, and there's altogether too much that you don't get for what you don't pay, for any serious sailor to take the Hunter 28 seriously. There's a good reason why first impressions should be taken seriously, too. What you don't pay for up front will surely be heavily loaded on the back end. Count on it ... If you wonder why people are leaving sailing like the plague just arrived, possibly this boat offers some reasons. There are too many just like it."

== See also ==
- List of sailing boat types

Related development

- Hunter 28.5
- Hunter 280

Similar sailboats

- Alerion Express 28
- Aloha 28
- Beneteau First 285
- Cal 28
- Catalina 28
- Cumulus 28
- Grampian 28
- J/28
- O'Day 28
- Pearson 28
- Sabre 28
- Sea Sprite 27
- Sirius 28
- Tanzer 28
- TES 28 Magnam
- Viking 28
