= Sea Sprite 27 =

Sailboat class

Development
- Designer: Bill Luders
- Location: United States
- Year: 1960
- Builder: C. E. Ryder
- Name: Sea Sprite 27

Boat
- Displacement: 7,600 lb (3,447 kg)
- Draft: 4.25 ft (1.30 m)

Hull
- Type: Monohull
- Construction: Fiberglass
- LOA: 27.92 ft (8.51 m)
- LWL: 20.00 ft (6.10 m)
- Beam: 8.83 ft (2.69 m)
- Engine: Universal Motor Company 11 hp (8 kW) diesel engine

Hull appendages
- Keel: long keel
- Ballast: 3,000 lb (1,361 kg)
- Rudder: keel-mounted rudder

Rig
- Rig type: Bermuda rig
- I foretriangle height: 30.00 ft (9.14 m)
- J foretriangle base: 10.30 ft (3.14 m)
- P mainsail luff: 31.00 ft (9.45 m)
- E mainsail foot: 12.00 ft (3.66 m)

Sails
- Sailplan: Fractional rigged sloop
- Mainsail area: 186.00 sq ft (17.280 m^{2})
- Jib/genoa area: 154.50 sq ft (14.354 m^{2})
- Total sail area: 340.50 sq ft (31.633 m^{2})

The Sea Sprite 27, also called the Sea Sprite 28 and the Luders 28, is an American sailboat that was designed by Bill Luders as a cruiser and first built in 1960.

The Sea Sprite 27 design is one of the Sea Sprite Sailing Yachts series of boats.

== Production ==
The design was built by C. E. Ryder in Bristol, Rhode Island, United States between 1960 and 1985, but it is now out of production.

== Design ==
The Sea Sprite 27 is a recreational keelboat, built predominantly of fiberglass, with teak wooden trim. It has a 7/8 fractional sloop rig, a spooned raked stem, a raised transom, a keel-mounted rudder controlled by a tiller and a fixed long keel. It displaces 7,600 lb (3,447 kg) and carries 3,000 lb (1,361 kg) of ballast.

The boat has a draft of 4.25 ft (1.30 m) with the standard long keel fitted.

The boat is fitted with a Universal Motor Company diesel engine of 11 hp (8 kW). The fuel tank holds 12 U.S. gallons (45 L; 10.0 imp gal) and the fresh water tank has a capacity of 50 U.S. gallons (190 L; 42 imp gal).

The boat's galley is located on the port side of the cabin just forward of the companionway steps, with the icebox doubling as a navigation table. The galley has a two-burner alcohol stove and a sink with pressurized water. The head occupies both side of the hull, just aft of the bow "V"-berth. Additional sleeping space is provided in the cabin with a double berth and a quarter berth.

Ventilation is provided by a translucent forward hatch and four opening ports in the cabin. A second mid-ship hatch was a factory option.

The cockpit has two genoa winches and a third winch for the halyards. There is a standard topping lift and jiffy-reefing. The mainsheet traveler is mounted just behind the cockpit.

Factory options included a boom vang, spinnaker and gear, roller furling and wheel steering in place of the tiller.

The design has a hull speed of 5.99 kn (11.09 km/h).

== See also ==
- List of sailing boat types

Related development

- Sea Sprite 34

Similar sailboats

- Alerion Express 28
- Aloha 28
- Beneteau First 285
- Cal 28
- Catalina 28
- Cumulus 28
- Grampian 28
- Hunter 28
- Hunter 28.5
- Hunter 280
- J/28
- O'Day 28
- Pearson 28
- Sabre 28
- Sirius 28
- Tanzer 28
- TES 28 Magnam
- Viking 28
