= J/28 =

Sailboat class

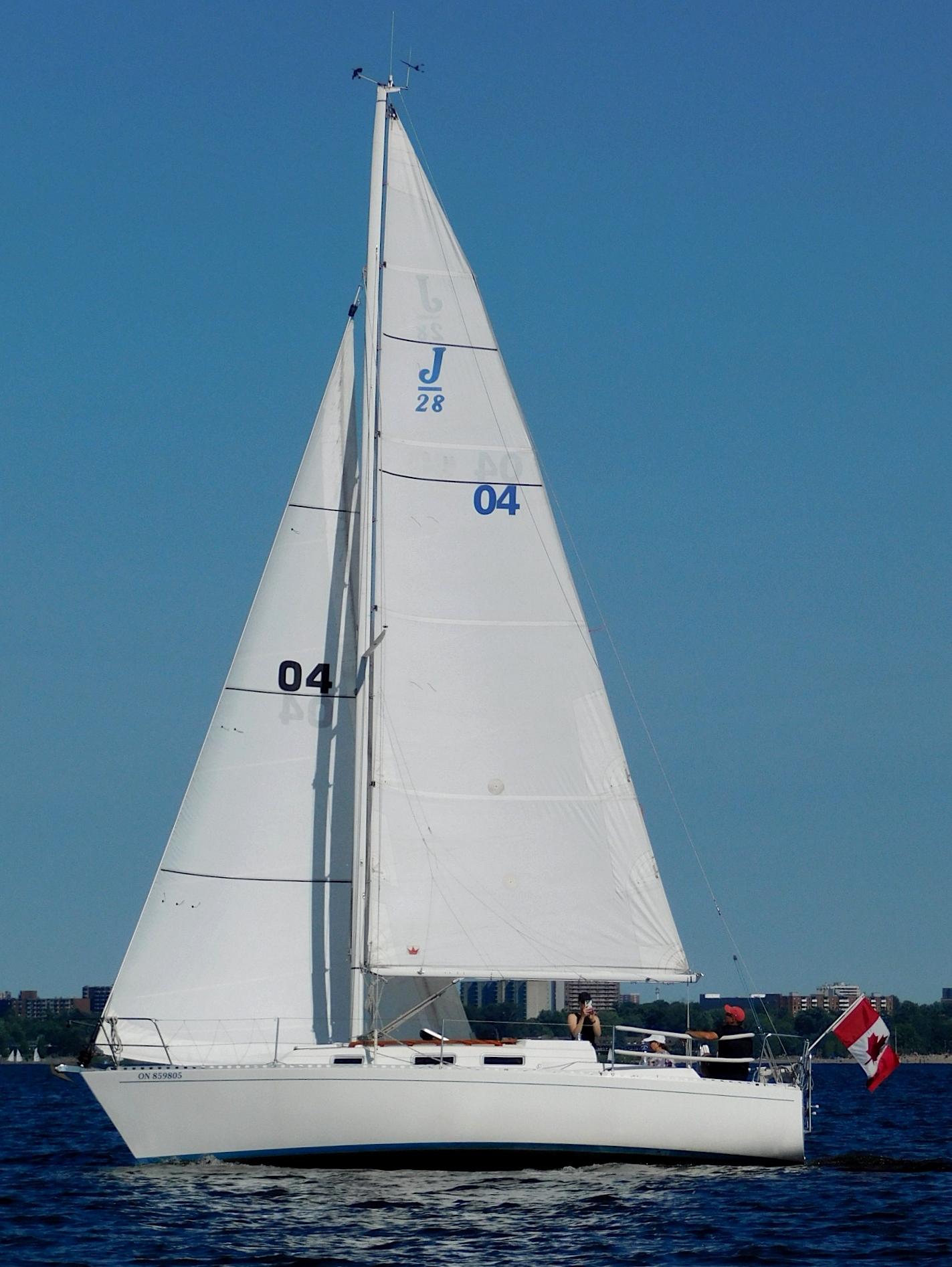

Development
- Designer: Rod Johnstone
- Location: United States
- Year: 1986
- No. built: 71
- Builder: J Boats (Tillotson Pearson)
- Name: J/28

Boat
- Displacement: 7,900 lb (3,583 kg)
- Draft: 5.00 ft (1.52 m)

Hull
- Type: Monohull
- Construction: Fiberglass
- LOA: 28.50 ft (8.69 m)
- LWL: 24.00 ft (7.32 m)
- Beam: 10.00 ft (3.05 m)
- Engine: Yanmar 2GM 18 hp (13 kW) diesel engine

Hull appendages
- Keel: fin keel
- Ballast: 3,000 lb (1,361 kg)
- Rudder: internally-mounted spade-type rudder

Rig
- General: Fractional rig
- I foretriangle height: 34.00 ft (10.36 m)
- J foretriangle base: 10.50 ft (3.20 m)
- P mainsail luff: 36.00 ft (10.97 m)
- E mainsail foot: 13.00 ft (3.96 m)

Sails
- Mainsail area: 234.00 sq ft (21.739 m^{2})
- Jib/genoa area: 178.50 sq ft (16.583 m^{2})
- Total sail area: 412.50 sq ft (38.323 m^{2})

The J/28 is an American sailboat designed by Rod Johnstone and first built in 1986.

== Production ==
The boat was built by J/Boats (Tillotson Pearson) in the United States. The company completed 71 examples between 1986 and 1988, but it is now out of production.

== Design ==
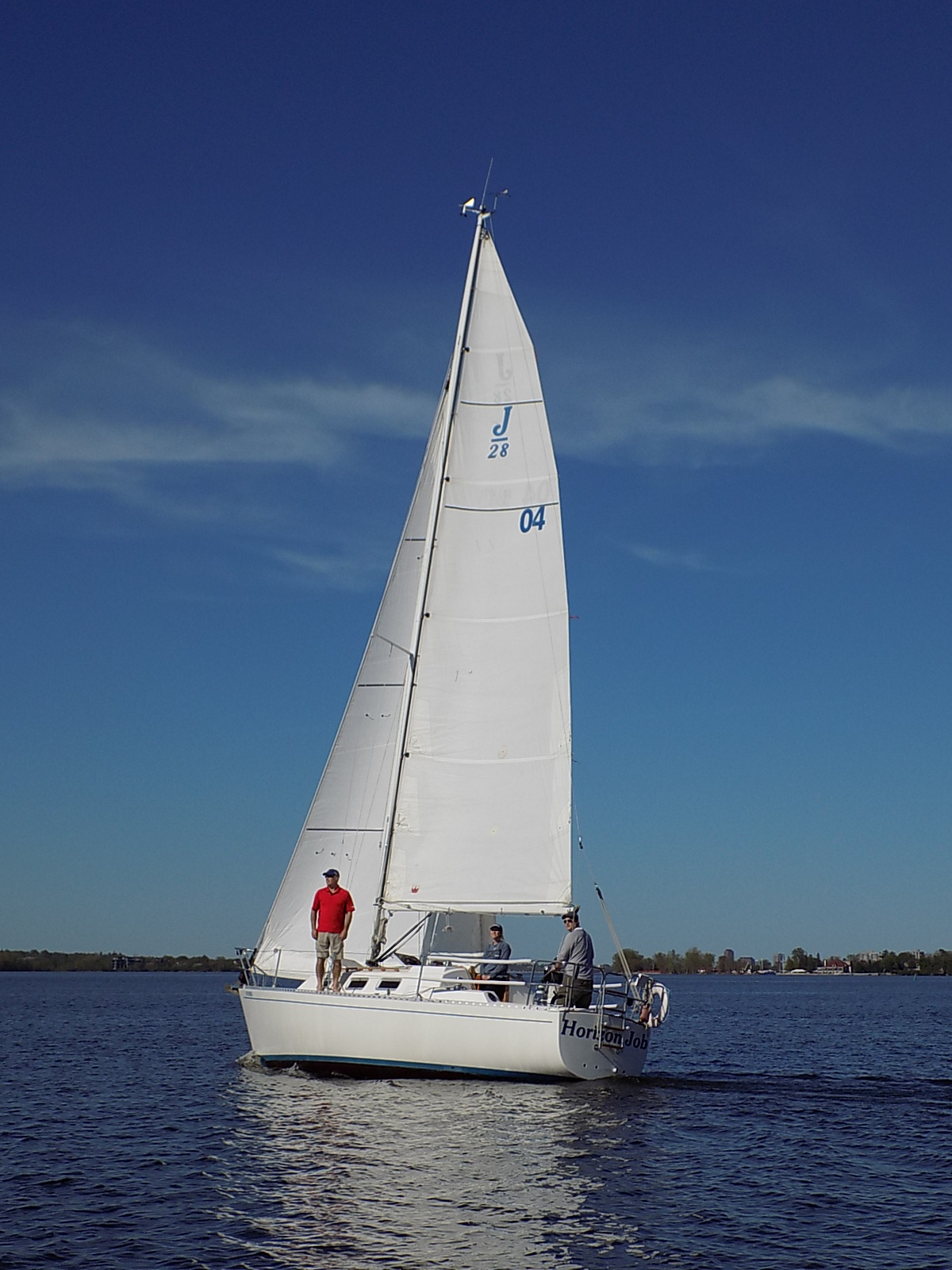
J/28 showing transom configuration

The J/28 is a small recreational keelboat, built predominantly of fiberglass, with wood trim. It has a fractional sloop rig, an internally-mounted spade-type rudder and a fixed fin keel. It displaces 7,900 lb (3,583 kg) and carries 3,000 lb (1,361 kg) of ballast.

The boat has a draft of 5.00 ft (1.52 m) with the standard keel fitted.

The boat is fitted with a Japanese Yanmar 2GM diesel engine of 18 hp (13 kW). The fuel tank holds 20 U.S. gallons (76 L; 17 imp gal) and the fresh water tank has a capacity of 35 U.S. gallons (130 L; 29 imp gal).

The design has a hull speed of 6.57 kn (12.17 km/h).

== See also ==
- List of sailing boat types

Similar sailboats

- Alerion Express 28
- Aloha 28
- Beneteau First 285
- Bristol Channel Cutter
- Cal 28
- Catalina 28
- Cumulus 28
- Grampian 28
- Hunter 28
- Hunter 28.5
- Hunter 280
- O'Day 28
- Pearson 28
- Sabre 28
- Sea Sprite 27
- Sirius 28
- Tanzer 28
- TES 28 Magnam
- Viking 28
