= Cumulus 28 =

Sailboat class

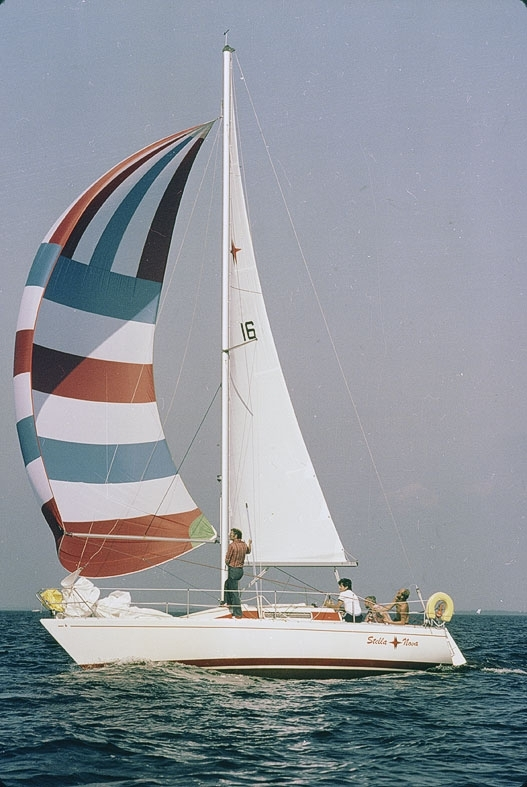

Development
- Designer: Peter Norlin
- Location: Sweden
- Year: 1978
- No. built: 567
- Builder: Albin Marine
- Name: Cumulus 28

Boat
- Displacement: 7,055 lb (3,200 kg)
- Draft: 5.25 ft (1.60 m)

Hull
- Type: Monohull
- Construction: Fiberglass
- LOA: 28.08 ft (8.56 m)
- LWL: 22.33 ft (6.81 m)
- Beam: 9.25 ft (2.82 m)
- Engine: Yanmar 12 hp (9 kW) diesel engine

Hull appendages
- Keel: fin keel
- Ballast: 2,812 lb (1,276 kg)
- Rudder: transom-mounted rudder

Rig
- Rig type: Bermuda rig
- I foretriangle height: 35.10 ft (10.70 m)
- J foretriangle base: 10.82 ft (3.30 m)
- P mainsail luff: 35.10 ft (10.70 m)
- E mainsail foot: 9.84 ft (3.00 m)

Sails
- Sailplan: Fractional rigged sloop
- Mainsail area: 172.69 sq ft (16.043 m^{2})
- Jib/genoa area: 189.89 sq ft (17.641 m^{2})
- Gennaker area: 194 sq ft (18.0 m^{2})
- Total sail area: 362.58 sq ft (33.685 m^{2})

The Cumulus 28, also called the Albin Cumulus, is a Swedish sailboat that was designed by Peter Norlin as a cruiser-racer and first built in 1978.

== Production ==
The design was built by Albin Marine in Sweden from 1978 to 1985, with 567 examples completed. The company also built boats in Taiwan. In 2008 the brand was sold to Bladen Composites in the United States.

== Design ==
The Cumulus 28 is a recreational keelboat, built predominantly of fiberglass, with teak wood trim. It has a 7/8 fractional sloop rig with aluminum spars, a deck-stepped mast with wire standing rigging. The hull has a raked stem, a reverse transom, a transom-hung rudder controlled by a tiller and a fixed fin keel. It displaces 7,055 lb (3,200 kg) and carries 2,812 lb (1,276 kg) of ballast.

The design has a draft of 5.25 ft (1.60 m) with the standard keel fitted. The boat is fitted with a Japanese Yanmar diesel engine of 12 hp (9 kW). The fuel tank holds 9.24 U.S. gallons (35.0 L; 7.69 imp gal) and the fresh water tank has a capacity of 25 U.S. gallons (95 L; 21 imp gal).

The boat's galley is located on the port side of the cabin at the bottom of the companionway steps. On the port side is a stainless steel sink and a three-burner alcohol stove. The head has a privacy door and is located forward, just aft of the bow "V"-berth and has a hanging locker. Additional sleeping space is provided by the dinette settee, which has a folding table. There is also a quarter berth aft on the starboard side, for a total sleeping accommodation for five people.

Ventilation is provided by an acrylic forward hatch and two ventilators, while the cabin ports are fixed.

The boat has internally-mounted halyards and includes jiffy reefing. The cockpit has two self-tailing genoa winches, with the genoa blocks track-mounted. The spinnaker also uses its own tracks and car. There is a standard 4:1 boom vang and 4:1 mainsheet. There is an anchor well in the bow.

== See also ==
- List of sailing boat types

Similar sailboats

- Alerion Express 28
- Aloha 28
- Beneteau First 285
- Cal 28
- Catalina 28
- Grampian 28
- Hunter 28
- Hunter 28.5
- Hunter 280
- J/28
- O'Day 28
- Pearson 28
- Sabre 28
- Sea Sprite 27
- Sirius 28
- Tanzer 28
- TES 28 Magnam
- Viking 28
