= Beneteau Oceanis 281 =

Sailboat class

Oceanis 281
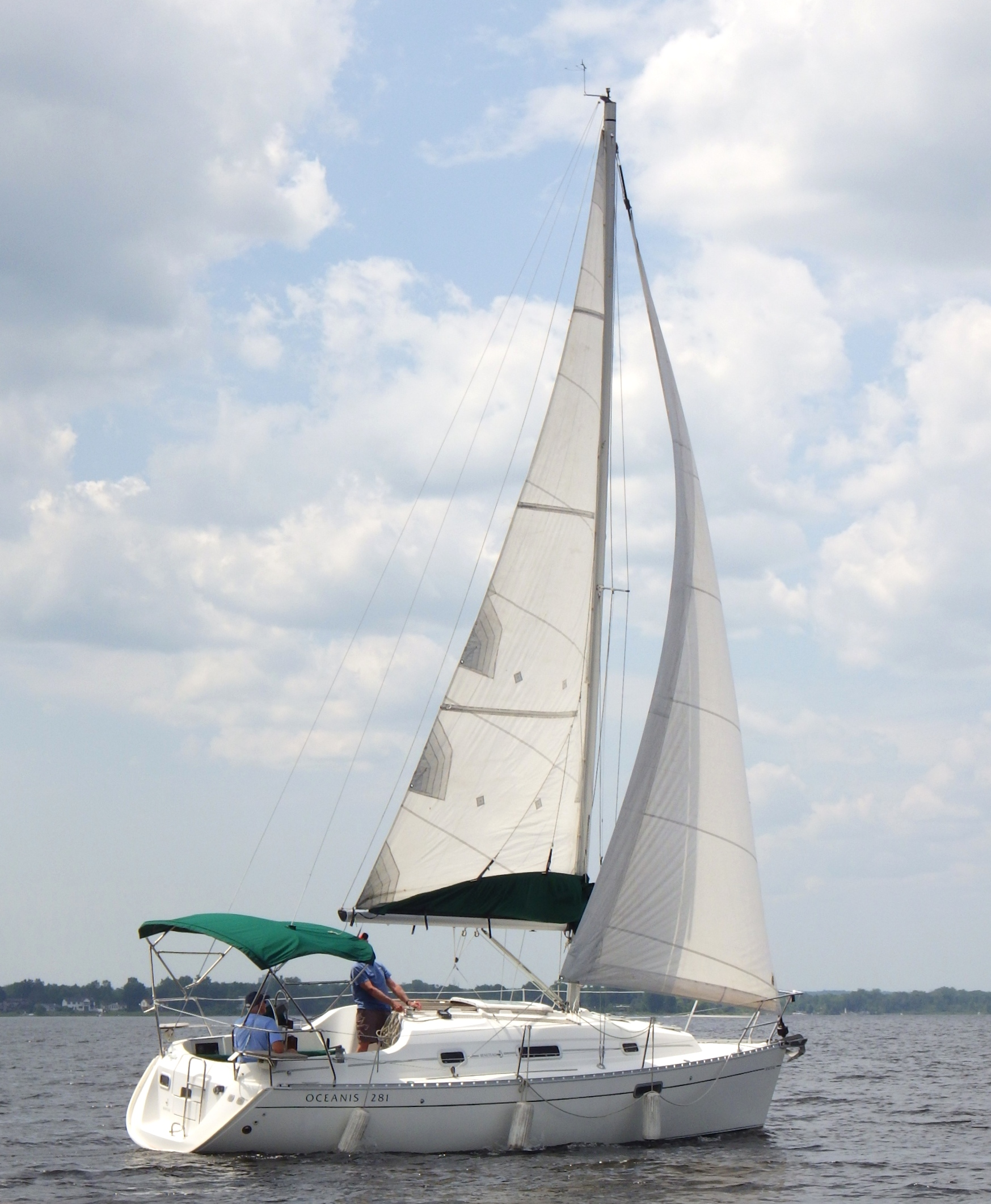

Development
- Designer: Groupe Finot
- Location: France
- Year: 1995
- No. built: 331
- Builder: Beneteau
- Name: Oceanis 281

Boat
- Displacement: 5,732 lb (2,600 kg)
- Draft: 4.00 ft (1.22 m)

Hull
- Type: Monohull
- Construction: Fiberglass
- LOA: 28.50 ft (8.69 m)
- LWL: 24.50 ft (7.47 m)
- Beam: 9.42 ft (2.87 m)
- Engine: Volvo MD2020 18 hp (13 kW) diesel engine

Hull appendages
- Keel: fin keel with weighed bulb
- Ballast: 1,676 lb (760 kg)
- Rudder: internally-mounted spade-type rudder

Rig
- Rig type: Bermuda rig
- I foretriangle height: 33.33 ft (10.16 m)
- J foretriangle base: 10.08 ft (3.07 m)
- P mainsail luff: 29.50 ft (8.99 m)
- E mainsail foot: 11.33 ft (3.45 m)

Sails
- Sailplan: Masthead sloop
- Mainsail area: 167.12 sq ft (15.526 m^{2})
- Jib/genoa area: 167.98 sq ft (15.606 m^{2})
- Total sail area: 335.10 sq ft (31.132 m^{2})

The Beneteau Oceanis 281 is a recreational keelboat first built in 1995 with 331 boats completed when production ended. It was built by Beneteau in France and the United States.

== Design ==
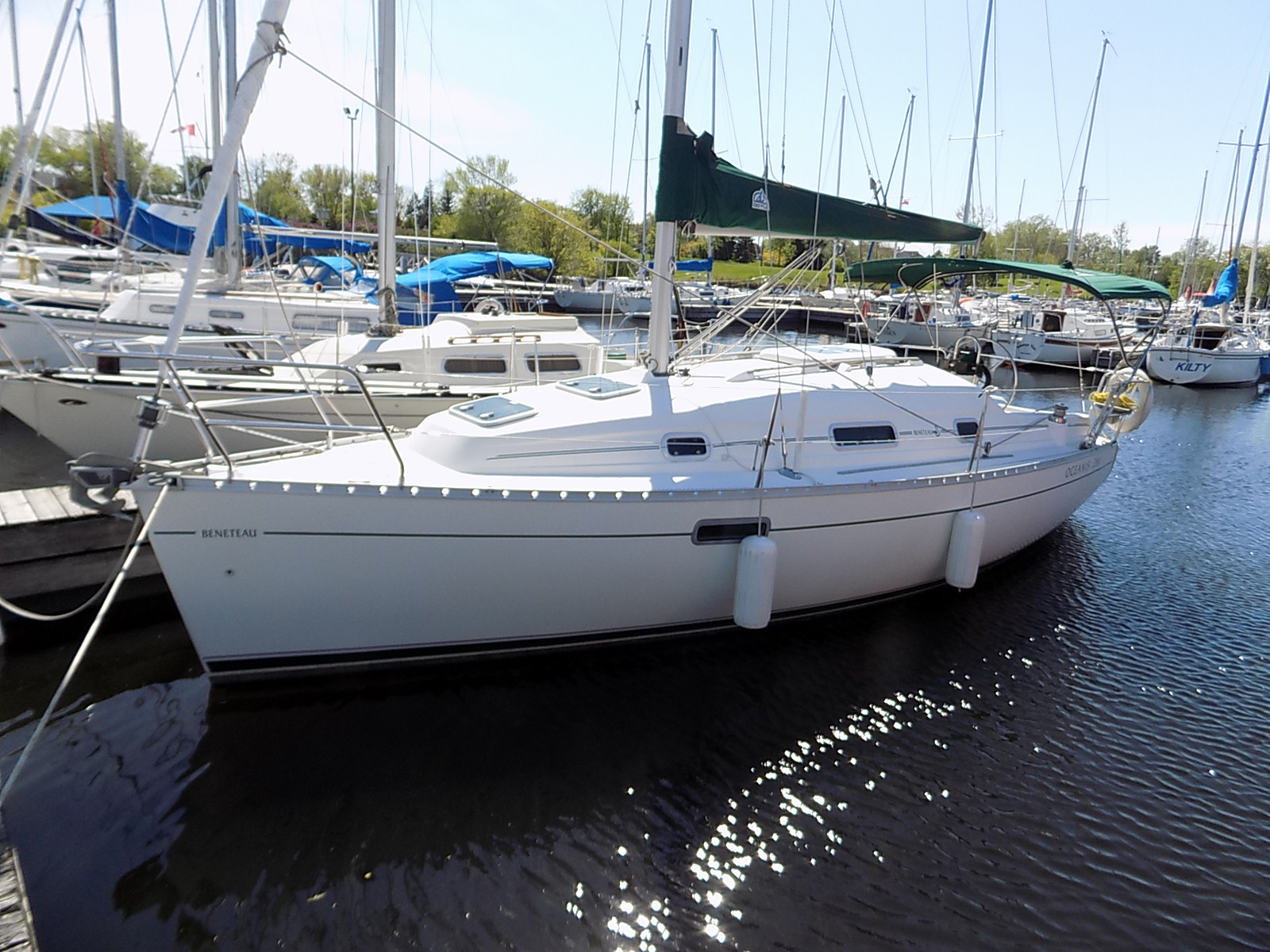
Beneteau Oceanis 281

The Oceanis 281 is a development of the Beneteau First 265. Designed by Groupe Finot, The Oceanis 281 is a built predominantly of fiberglass. It has a masthead sloop rig, a slightly raked stem, a reverse transom, an internally-mounted spade-type rudder controlled by a wheel or tiller, and has a fixed fin keel with a weighted bulb. It displaces 5,732 lb (2,600 kg) and carries 1,676 lb (760 kg) of ballast.

The boat has a draft of 4.00 ft (1.22 m) with the standard keel fitted.

The boat is fitted with a Swedish Volvo MD2020 diesel engine of 18 hp (13 kW). The fuel tank holds 8 U.S. gallons (30 L; 6.7 imp gal) and the fresh water tank has a capacity of 50 U.S. gallons (190 L; 42 imp gal).

The design has a hull speed of 6.63 kn (12.28 km/h).
