= Sirius 28 =

1980s Canadian recreational keelboat

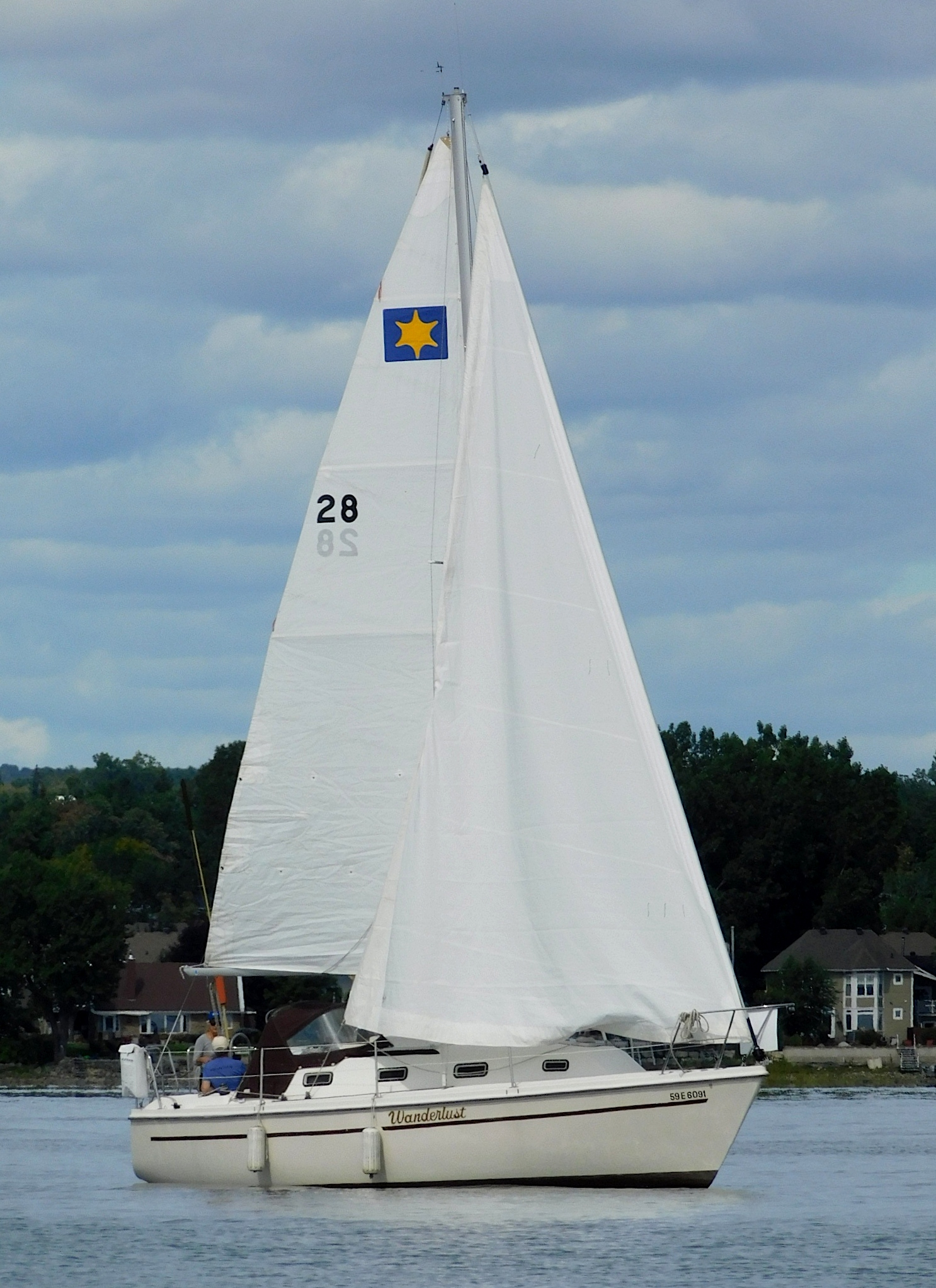

Development
- Designer: Hubert Vandestadt
- Location: Canada
- Year: 1982
- No. built: 120
- Builder: Vandestadt and McGruer
- Name: Sirius 28

Boat
- Displacement: 6,700 lb (3,039 kg)
- Draft: 4.30 ft (1.31 m)

Hull
- Type: Monohull
- Construction: Fibreglass
- LOA: 28.00 ft (8.53 m)
- LWL: 24.00 ft (7.32 m)
- Beam: 9.67 ft (2.95 m)
- Engine: Yanmar 1GM diesel engine, 7.5 hp (6 kW)

Hull appendages
- Keel: fin keel
- Ballast: 2,600 lb (1,179 kg)
- Rudder: internally-mounted spade-type rudder

Rig
- General: Masthead sloop
- I foretriangle height: 35.75 ft (10.90 m)
- J foretriangle base: 11.16 ft (3.40 m)
- P mainsail luff: 30.00 ft (9.14 m)
- E mainsail foot: 12.00 ft (3.66 m)

Sails
- Mainsail area: 180.00 sq ft (16.723 m^{2})
- Jib/genoa area: 199.49 sq ft (18.533 m^{2})
- Total sail area: 379.49 sq ft (35.256 m^{2})

Racing
- PHRF: 192 (average)

The Sirius 28 is a recreational keelboat built by Vandestadt and McGruer Ltd in Owen Sound, Ontario, Canada between 1982 and 1987, with 120 examples completed.

It has a masthead sloop rig.

Designed by Hubert Vandestadt the fibreglass hull has a fixed fin keel with a hull speed of 6.56 kn (12.15 km/h).

The fuel tank holds 19 U.S. gallons (72 L; 16 imp gal) and the fresh water tank has a capacity of 24 U.S. gallons (91 L; 20 imp gal).
