= TES 28 Magnam =

2010 Polish keelboat

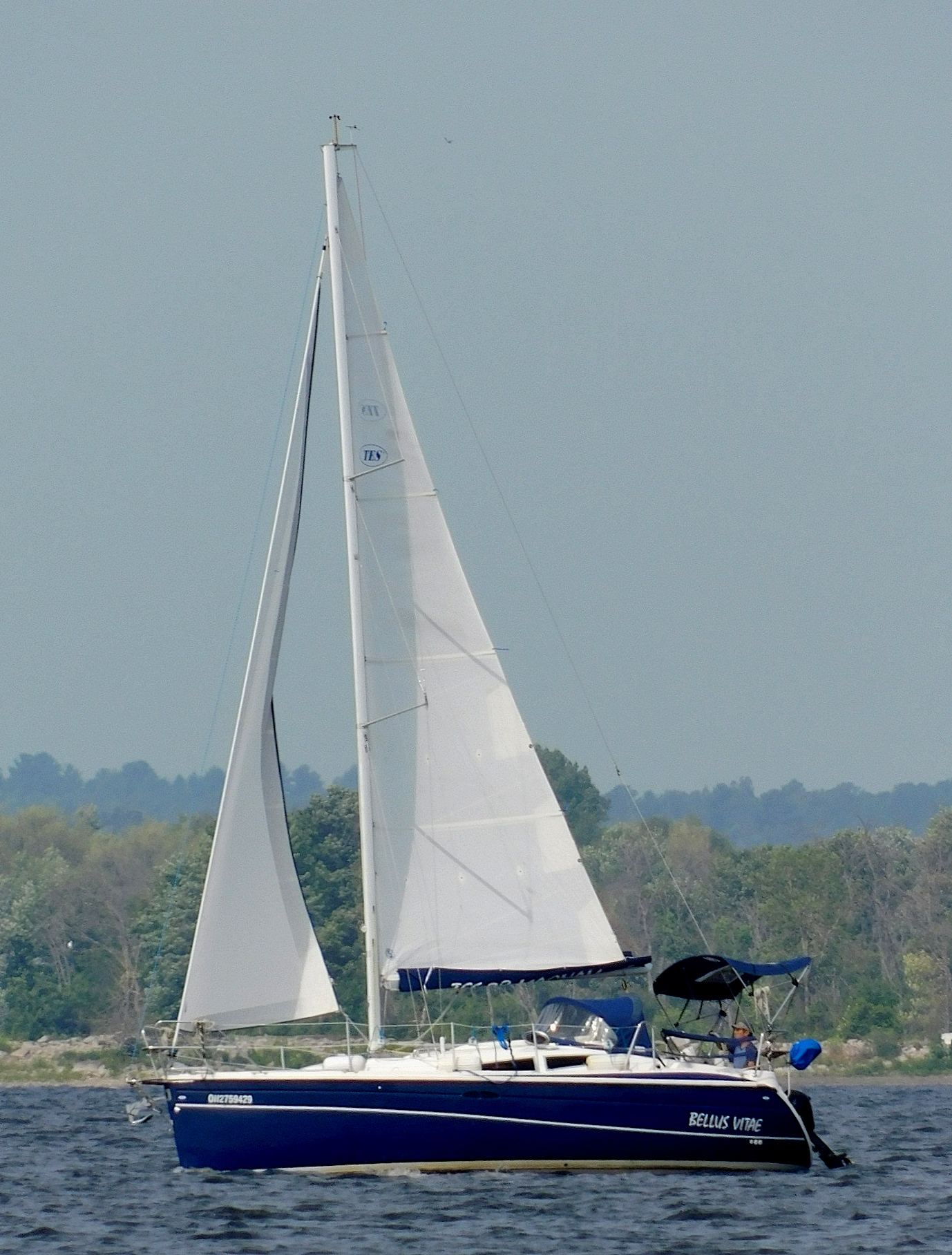

Development
- Designer: Tomasz Siwik
- Location: Poland
- Year: 2010
- Builder: Stocznia TES - Yacht
- Name: TES 28 Magnam

Boat
- Displacement: 6,400 lb (2,903 kg)
- Draft: 4.58 ft (1.40 m) with the keel down

Hull
- Type: Monohull
- Construction: Fiberglass
- LOA: 28.00 ft (8.53 m)
- LWL: 26.00 ft (7.92 m)
- Beam: 9.92 ft (3.02 m)
- Engine: Inboard or outboard motor

Hull appendages
- Keel: fin keel or centreboard
- Ballast: 1,980 lb (898 kg)
- Rudder: internally-mounted spade-type rudder

Rig
- General: Fractional rigged sloop

Sails
- Total sail area: 380 sq ft (35 m^{2})

The TES 28 Magnam (English: Magnum) is a Polish sailboat, that was designed by Tomasz Siwik and was first built in 2010.

== Production ==
The boat is built by Stocznia TES - Yacht (English: TES Yacht Shipyard) in Poland and remained in production in 2022.

== Design ==
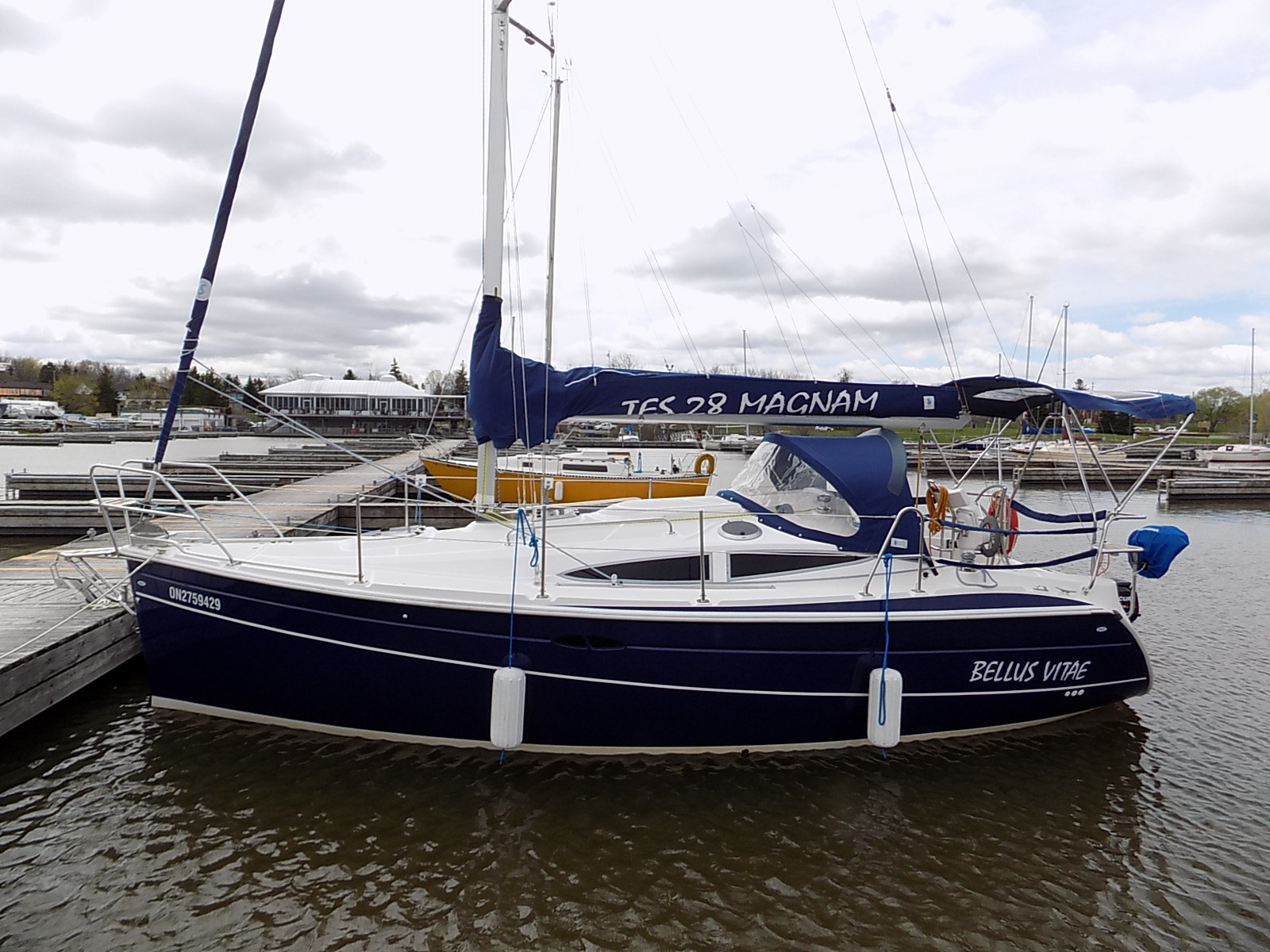
TES 28 Magnam

The TES 28 Magnam is a small recreational keelboat, built predominantly of fiberglass. It has a fractional sloop rig, an internally-mounted spade-type rudder controlled by a tiller or optionally a wheel and a retractable centreboard or optional fixed keel. It displaces 6,400 lb (2,903 kg) and carries 1,980 lb (898 kg) of ballast.

The centreboard version can be transported by trailer.

The boat has a draft of 4.58 ft (1.40 m) with the centerboard down and 1.06 ft (0.32 m) with the centerboard up.

The boat can be fitted with either and inboard or outboard motor. The fresh water tank has a capacity of 16 U.S. gallons (61 L; 13 imp gal).

The design has a hull speed of 6.83 kn (12.65 km/h).
