= Beneteau 31 =

Sailboat class

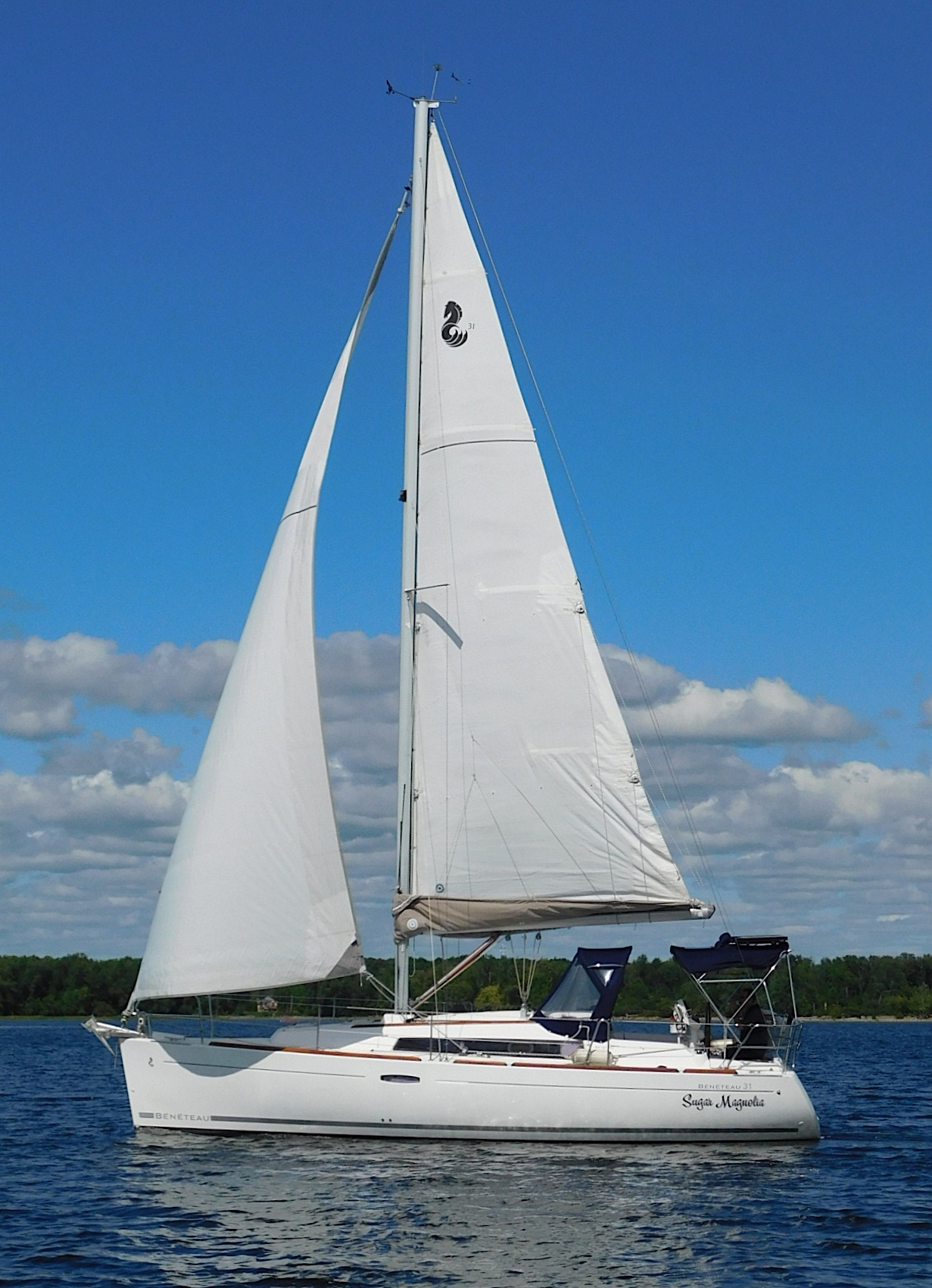

Development
- Designer: Groupe Finot
- Location: France
- Year: 2002
- Builder: Beneteau
- Name: Beneteau 31

Boat
- Displacement: 8,933 lb (4,052 kg)
- Draft: 5.83 ft (1.78 m)

Hull
- Type: Monohull
- Construction: glassfibre
- LOA: 31.67 ft (9.65 m)
- LWL: 28.50 ft (8.69 m)
- Beam: 11.08 ft (3.38 m)
- Engine: Yanmar 22 hp (16 kW) diesel engine

Hull appendages
- Keel: fin keel with weighted bulb
- Ballast: 2,207 lb (1,001 kg)
- Rudder: internally-mounted spade-type rudder

Rig
- Rig type: Bermuda rig
- I foretriangle height: 38.67 ft (11.79 m)
- J foretriangle base: 12.08 ft (3.68 m)
- P mainsail luff: 35.75 ft (10.90 m)
- E mainsail foot: 12.75 ft (3.89 m)

Sails
- Sailplan: Fractional rigged sloop
- Mainsail area: 227.91 sq ft (21.174 m^{2})
- Jib/genoa area: 233.57 sq ft (21.699 m^{2})
- Total sail area: 461.47 sq ft (42.872 m^{2})

Racing
- PHRF: 135 (average)

The Beneteau 31 is a French sailboat, that was designed by Groupe Finot and first built in 2002.

== Production ==
The design was built by Beneteau in France, starting in 2002, but it is now out of production.

== Design ==
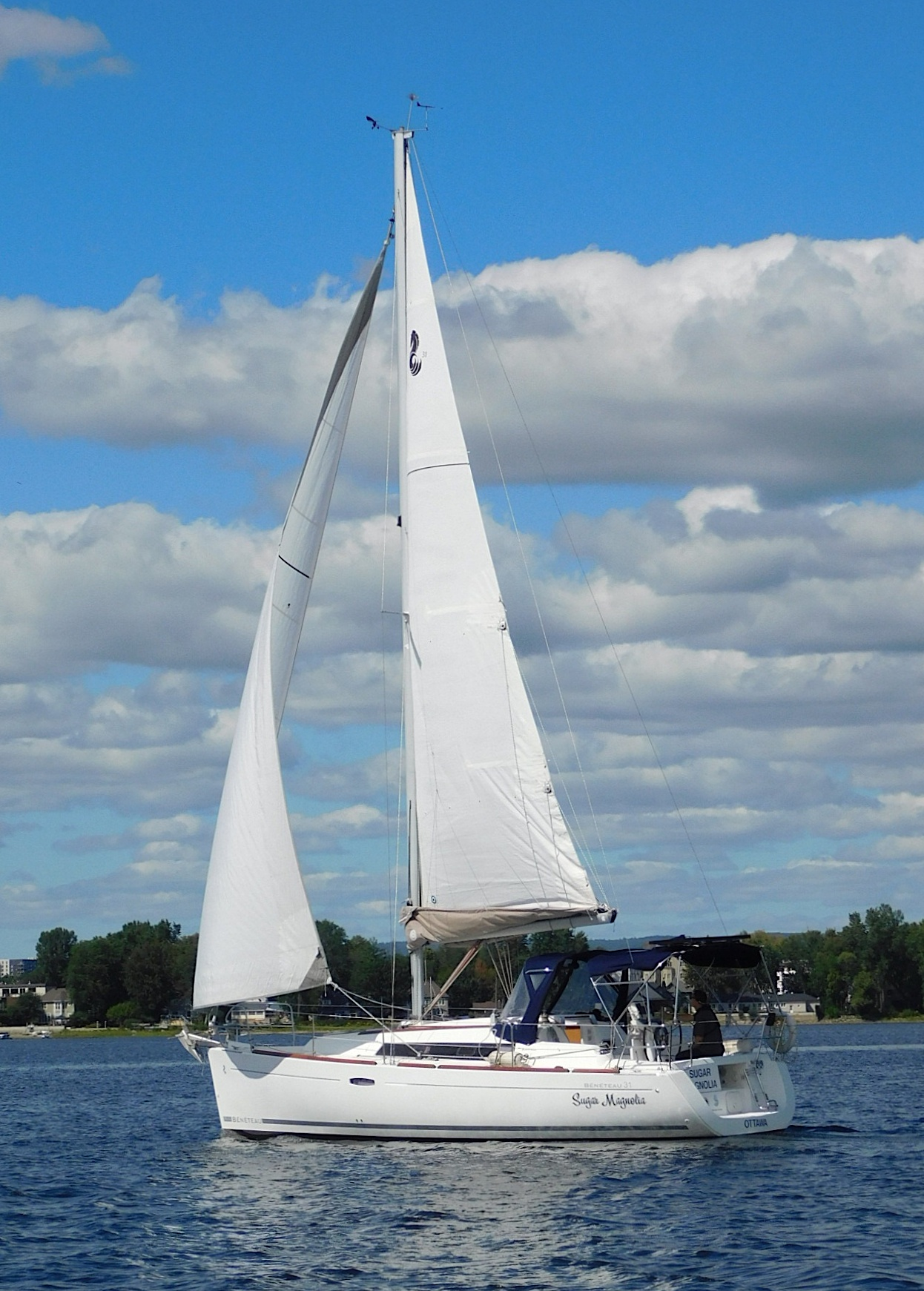
Beneteau 31, showing the walk-though transom

The Beneteau 31 is a recreational keelboat, built predominantly of glassfibre. It has a fractional sloop rig, a nearly-plumb stem, a reverse transom, an internally-mounted spade-type rudder controlled by a wheel and a fixed fin keel. It displaces 8,933 lb (4,052 kg) and carries 2,207 lb (1,001 kg) of ballast.

The boat has a draft of 5.83 ft (1.78 m) with the standard keel and 4.25 ft (1.30 m) with the optional shoal draft keel. the shoal draft keel version carries 2,412 lb (1,094 kg) of ballast.

The boat is fitted with a Japanese Yanmar diesel engine of 22 hp (16 kW). The fuel tank holds 34 U.S. gallons (130 L; 28 imp gal) and the fresh water tank also has a capacity of 34 U.S. gallons (130 L; 28 imp gal).

The design has sleeping accommodation for four people, with a double "V"-berth berth in the bow cabin, a straight settee and dining table in the main cabin and an aft cabin with a transverse double berth on the port side. The galley is located on the port side at the companionway ladder. The galley is C-shaped and is equipped with a two-burner stove and a double sink. The enclosed head is located opposite the galley, aft.

The design has a PHRF racing average handicap of 135 with a high of 129 and low of 153. It has a hull speed of 7.15 kn (13.24 km/h).

== See also ==
- List of sailing boat types

Similar sailboats

- Allmand 31
- Catalina 310
- Corvette 31
- Douglas 31
- Herreshoff 31
- Hunter 31
- Hunter 31-2
- Hunter 310
- Hunter 320
- Marlow-Hunter 31
- Niagara 31
- Nonsuch 324
- Roue 20
- Tanzer 31
