= Hunter 310 =

Sailboat class

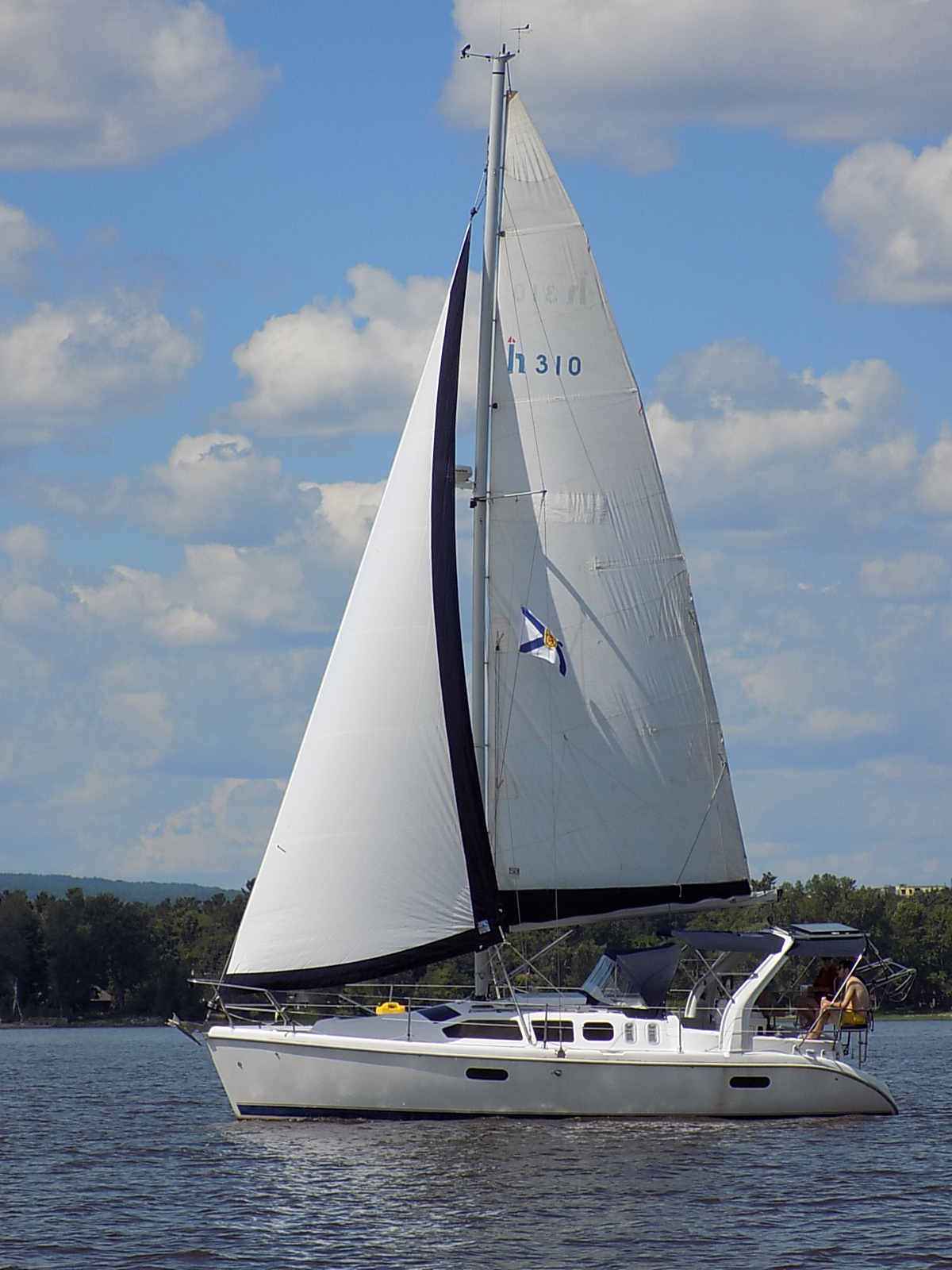

Development
- Designer: Hunter Design Team
- Location: United States
- Year: 1997
- Builder: Hunter Marine
- Name: Hunter 310

Boat
- Displacement: 8,500 lb (3,856 kg)
- Draft: 5.50 ft (1.68 m)

Hull
- Type: Monohull
- Construction: Fiberglass
- LOA: 30.83 ft (9.40 m)
- LWL: 28.00 ft (8.53 m)
- Beam: 10.83 ft (3.30 m)
- Engine: Yanmar 18 hp (13 kW) diesel engine

Hull appendages
- Keel: fin keel
- Ballast: 3,000 lb (1,361 kg)
- Rudder: internally-mounted spade-type rudder

Rig
- Rig type: B&R rig
- I foretriangle height: 37.08 ft (11.30 m)
- J foretriangle base: 11.67 ft (3.56 m)
- P mainsail luff: 39.08 ft (11.91 m)
- E mainsail foot: 12.67 ft (3.86 m)

Sails
- Sailplan: Fractional rigged sloop
- Mainsail area: 247.57 sq ft (23.000 m^{2})
- Jib/genoa area: 216.36 sq ft (20.101 m^{2})
- Total sail area: 463.93 sq ft (43.101 m^{2})

Racing
- PHRF: 168 (average)

The Hunter 310 is an American sailboat, that was designed by the Hunter Design Team and first built in 1997.

The 310 design was developed into the Hunter 320 in 2000.

== Production ==
The boat was built by Hunter Marine in the United States, but it is now out of production.

== Design ==
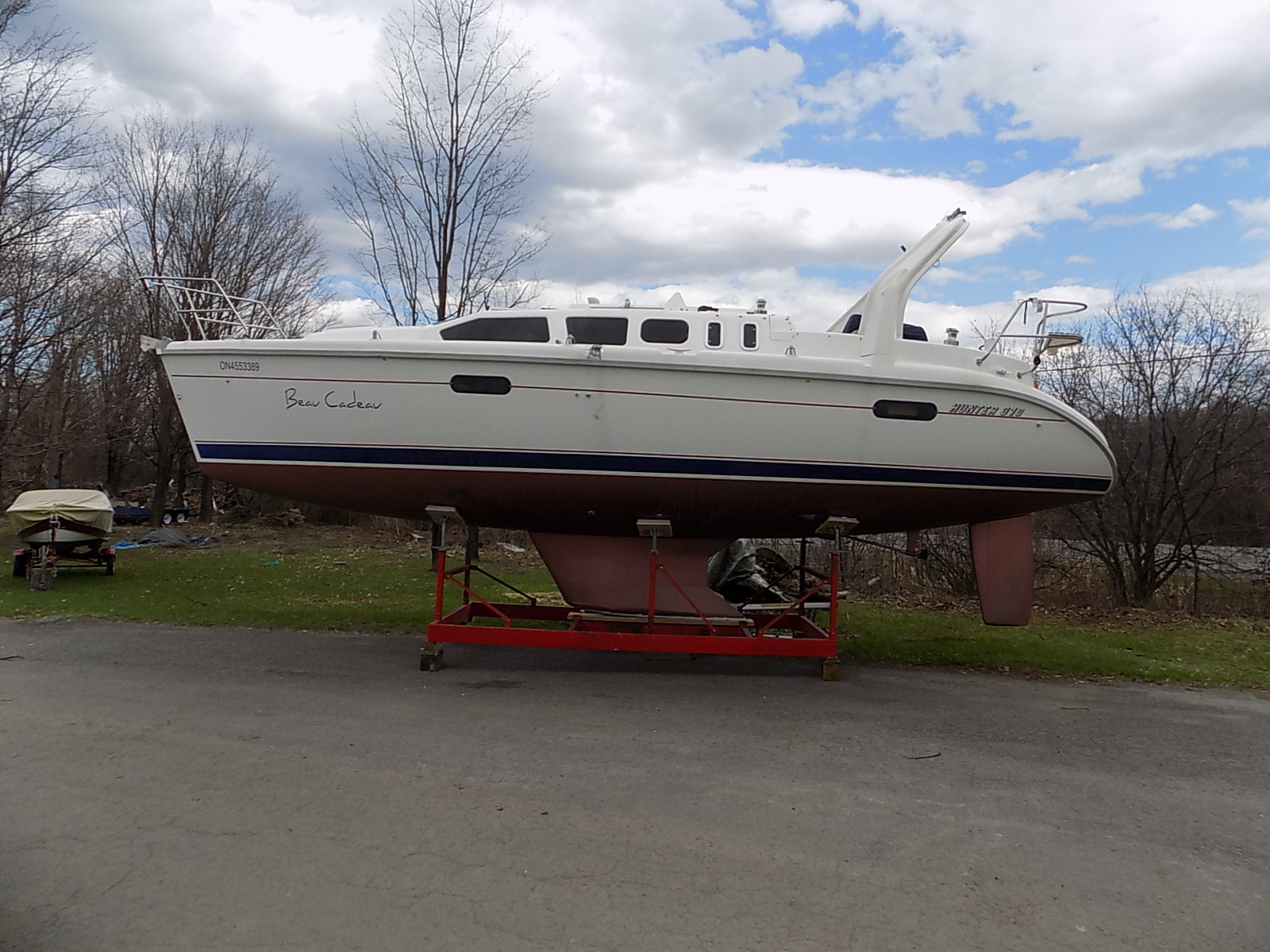
Hunter 310 on its cradle, showing the keel and rudder configuration

The Hunter 310 is a small recreational keelboat, built predominantly of fiberglass. It has a fractional sloop Bergstrom & Ridder rig, an internally-mounted spade-type rudder and a fixed fin keel. It displaces 8,500 lb (3,856 kg) and carries 3,000 lb (1,361 kg) of ballast.

The boat has a draft of 5.50 ft (1.68 m) with the standard keel and 4.00 ft (1.22 m) with the optional shoal draft keel.

The boat is fitted with a Japanese Yanmar diesel engine of 18 hp (13 kW). The fuel tank holds 25 U.S. gallons (95 L; 21 imp gal) and the fresh water tank has a capacity of 20 U.S. gallons (76 L; 17 imp gal).

The design has a PHRF racing average handicap of 168 with a high of 182 and low of 162. It has a hull speed of 7.09 kn (13.13 km/h).

== Operational history ==
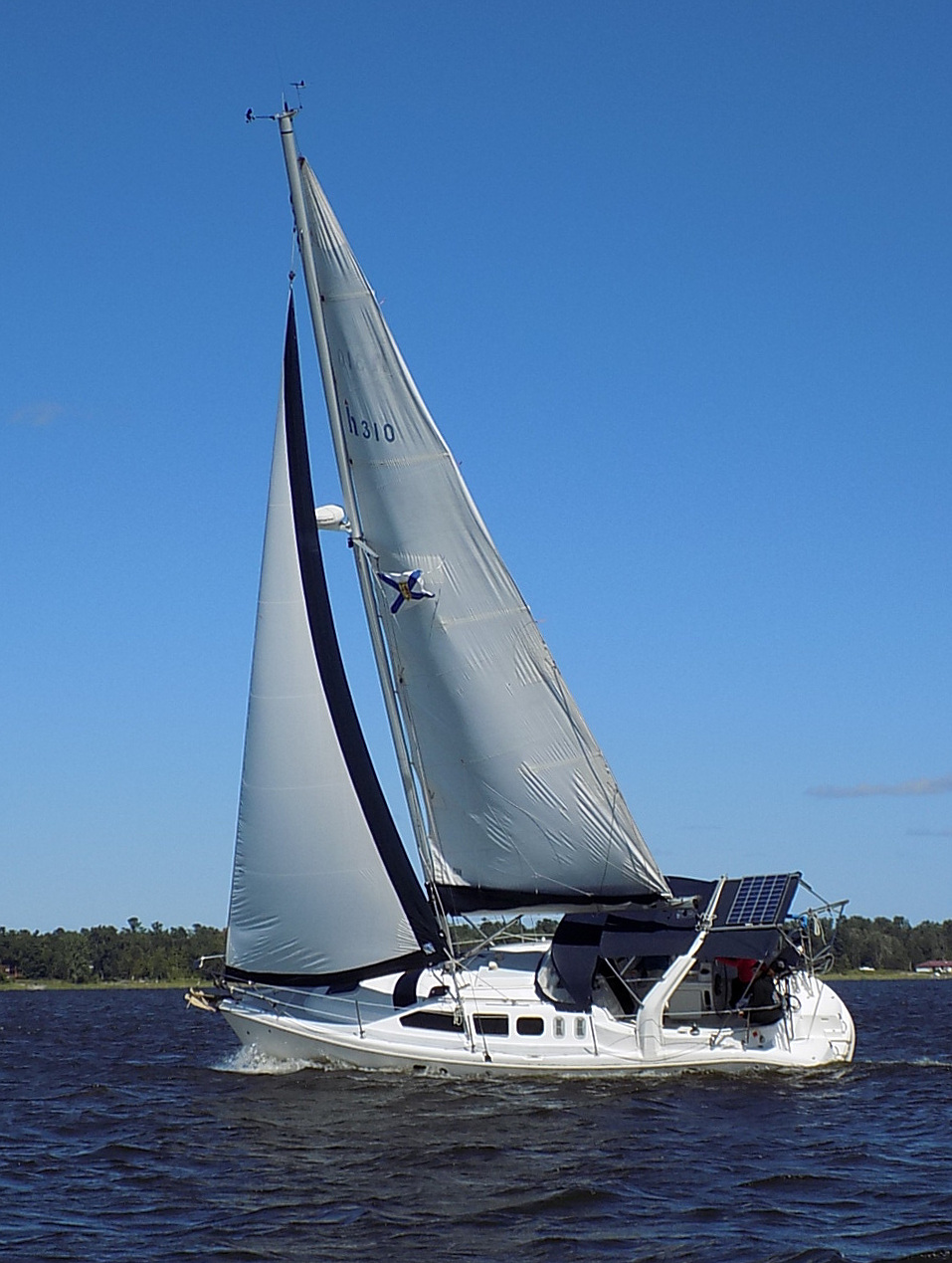
Hunter 310

A review by Darrell Nicholson of Practical Sailor described the design as an "innovative family boat typifies Hunter’s design philosophy with its B&R rig, radar arch, circular cockpit and good value, but owners cite numerous niggling problems." On saling performance he wrote, "Sailing performance depends on a variety of elements. When hull form, sail plan, displacement, and foil shapes harmonize, the 310 sings, but that doesn’t always happen .. her sail area is small, just 455 sq. feet, less than any cruiser —save the Catalina 30 short rig—in her class. On the drawing board the 310's sail area may balance her design displacement. On the water a small sail plan usually gets overwhelmed by actual displacement. It's nice to have sailpower in reserve when the inevitable weight of cruising gear gets added to a boat. The 310 has no such margin. This hampers pure performance, but allows pleasing performance—that combination of good speed, sailing ease, and a sense of security that can make a boat fun even if she isn't overly fast. The 310 is a good example of how Hunter tries to keep the sizzle in sailing while tuning down the complexity and factoring out the fear."

== See also ==
- List of sailing boat types

Similar sailboats

- Allmand 31
- Beneteau 31
- Catalina 310
- Corvette 31
- Douglas 31
- Herreshoff 31
- Hunter 31
- Hunter 31-2
- Marlow-Hunter 31
- Niagara 31
- Nonsuch 324
- Roue 20
- Tanzer 31
