= Allmand 31 =

Sailboat class

Development
- Designer: Walter Scott
- Location: United States
- Year: 1978
- Builder: Allmand Boats
- Name: Allmand 31

Boat
- Displacement: 11,100 lb (5,035 kg)
- Draft: 3.83 ft (1.17 m)

Hull
- Type: Monohull
- Construction: Fiberglass
- LOA: 30.75 ft (9.37 m)
- LWL: 27.92 ft (8.51 m)
- Beam: 11.33 ft (3.45 m)
- Engine: Universal M16 or M35 20 hp (15 kW) diesel engine

Hull appendages
- Keel: fin keel
- Ballast: 4,300 lb (1,950 kg)
- Rudder: skeg-mounted rudder

Rig
- Rig type: Bermuda rig
- I foretriangle height: 41.00 ft (12.50 m)
- J foretriangle base: 12.00 ft (3.66 m)
- P mainsail luff: 34.40 ft (10.49 m)
- E mainsail foot: 12.50 ft (3.81 m)

Sails
- Sailplan: Masthead sloop
- Mainsail area: 215.00 sq ft (19.974 m^{2})
- Jib/genoa area: 246.00 sq ft (22.854 m^{2})
- Total sail area: 461.00 sq ft (42.828 m^{2})

Racing
- D-PN: 85.5

The Allmand 31 is an American sailboat that was designed by Walter Scott as a cruiser and first built in 1978.

The Allmand 31 design was originally marketed as the Sail 31 and was later sold as the Allmand 312, with the same deck and hull, but a different interior layout.

== Production ==
The design was built by Allmand Boats in Hialeah, Florida, United States from 1978 to 1985, but it is now out of production.

== Design ==
The Allmand 31 is a recreational keelboat, built predominantly of fiberglass, with wood trim. The deck has an end-grain balsa core. It has a masthead sloop rig with aluminum spars, a raked stem, a near-vertical transom, a skeg-mounted rudder controlled by a wheel and a short fixed fin keel. It displaces 11,100 lb (5,035 kg) and carries 4,300 lb (1,950 kg) of iron ballast with the standard rig or lead with the tall rig.

The boat has a draft of 3.83 ft (1.17 m) with the standard keel fitted.

A tall rig was optional, with a mast about 2.0 ft (0.61 m) higher than standard for use in locations with light winds.

The boat is fitted with a Universal M16 or M35 diesel engine of 20 hp (15 kW). Some sources state the standard engine was a Universal 16 hp (12 kW) M-20 diesel, with a Universal 21 hp (16 kW) M-25 optional. The fuel tank holds 28 U.S. gallons (110 L; 23 imp gal) and the fresh water tank has a capacity of 40 U.S. gallons (150 L; 33 imp gal).

The design has a galley on the starboard side, including an 8 95 cu ft (2.7 m^{3}) icebox and pressure water. The head is located forward on the port side, just aft of the bow "V"-berth. Additional sleeping accommodation includes an aft cabin under the cockpit, a port side main cabin settee that converts to a double and a starboard side settee/berth for total sleeping space for seven people. The dinette also seats seven people.

Ventilation is provided by hatches over the aft cabin, main cabin and bow cabin, plus seven opening ports.

Two winches are provided in the cockpit for the genoa sheets and a winch on the mast for the mainsail halyard, plus another winch for the genoa halyard.

The design has a Portsmouth Yardstick racing average handicap of 85.5.

== Operational history ==
In a review Richard Sherwood wrote, "the Allmand is claimed to have a tacking angle of 84 degrees. Because beam on deck is 11 feet 4 inches and 8 feet 6 inches at the water, after initially heeling she picks up a large amount of buoyancy and is stiff. The long water line allows for additional internal volume."

Gregg Nestor wrote a review of the design in Cruising World in 2013, noting its sailing qualities, "under sail, the boat accelerates quickly, but windward performance is hampered by its wide beam and shoal draft. Although the 31 will tack through about 90 degrees and is extraordinarily stiff and sails almost level, it makes noticeable leeway. Its best points of sail are off the wind." He concluded, "the strongest features of the Allmand 31 are its generous interior and its spacious cockpit. Its moderate rig is easily managed, but the shoal draft and the smallish sail area make the Allmand 31 a better candidate for coastal cruising than bluewater sailing. The boat is solidly constructed and doesn’t look that dated, but the builder wasn’t known for sailboats, and this probably accounts for the 31’s current depressed price"

A review in Practical Sailor, stated, "this 1970's era cruiser is beloved for its roomy, tri-cabin interior, but it does not sail close to the wind and the shoal keel makes excessive leeway.".

== Variants ==
Allmand 31
Base model
Allmand 312
Model with same deck and hull, but an alternate interior design.

== See also ==
- List of sailing boat types

Similar sailboats

- Beneteau 31
- Catalina 310
- Corvette 31
- Douglas 31
- Herreshoff 31
- Hunter 31
- Hunter 31-2
- Hunter 310
- Hunter 320
- Marlow-Hunter 31
- Niagara 31
- Tanzer 31
