= Herreshoff 31 =

Sailboat class

Development
- Designer: Halsey Chase Herreshoff
- Location: United States
- Year: 1979
- No. built: 100
- Builder: Cat Ketch Corp.
- Role: Cruiser
- Name: Herreshoff 31

Boat
- Displacement: 7,560 lb (3,429 kg)
- Draft: 4.00 ft (1.22 m)

Hull
- Type: Monohull
- Construction: Fiberglass, polyurethane and wood
- LOA: 30.83 ft (9.40 m)
- LWL: 27.97 ft (8.53 m)
- Beam: 10.33 ft (3.15 m)
- Engine: Nanni Industries/Yanmar diesel engine

Hull appendages
- Keel: fin keel
- Ballast: 3,350 lb (1,520 kg)
- Rudder: transom-mounted rudder

Rig
- Rig type: catboat

Sails
- Sailplan: Cat rigged ketch
- Mainsail area: 242 sq ft (22.5 m^{2})
- Other sails: mizzen: 151 sq ft (14.0 m^{2}) staysail: 248 sq ft (23.0 m^{2})
- Total sail area: 641 sq ft (59.6 m^{2})

The Herreshoff 31, also called the Cat Ketch 31, is an American sailboat that was designed by Halsey Chase Herreshoff as a cruiser and first built in 1979.

== Production ==
The design was built by Cat Ketch Corp. in the United States from 1979 to 1986, with 100 examples completed, but it is now out of production.

== Design ==
The Herreshoff 31 is a recreational keelboat, built predominantly of fiberglass and polyurethane over wood, with wood trim. It has an unstayed catboat ketch rig, which can also be supplemented with a staysail on the aft mast, with an area of 248 sq ft (23.0 m^{2}). the design has a spooned plumb stem, a near-vertical transom, a transom-hung rudder on a skeg controlled by a tiller and a fixed fin keel. It displaces 7,560 lb (3,429 kg) and carries 3,350 lb (1,520 kg) of lead ballast.

The boat has a draft of 4.00 ft (1.22 m) with the standard keel fitted.

The boat is fitted with an Italian Nanni Industries or Japanese Yanmar diesel engine for docking and maneuvering. The fuel tank holds 18 U.S. gallons (68 L; 15 imp gal) and the fresh water tank has a capacity of 60 U.S. gallons (230 L; 50 imp gal).

The space below decks is large, and lacks a forward bulkhead between the main cabin and the forward cabin. The galley is located to starboard and includes a two-burner stove. The head is to port at the foot of the companionway stairs, opposite the galley.

Sleeping accommodation consists of a forward "V"-berth in the bow and two double bunks in the main cabin, with a stowable table in-between them. The berths all have drawer stowage underneath them.

The unstayed rigging features a simple layout, with only an outhaul, halyard, downhaul and sheets for each loose-footed sail. The booms are high and on the starboard side of each sail. The boat can be sailed on one sail or both and with either reefed. The staysail can be raised on the aft mast in lighter air. The masts are designed to flex to shed excess wind loads. There are no winches for the sheets and none are required.

== Operational history ==
In a review of the Herreshoff 31, Richard Sherwood noted, "the popularity of cat-ketches is due to the ease with which they can be sailed. Masts are usually unstayed and running rigging is simple. Tacking does not have to involve sail handling. Many of these boats have a fairly high ballast/displacement ratio, are good (though not excellent) sailers on all points, and have a lot of room below."

== See also ==
- List of sailing boat types

Similar sailboats

- Allmand 31
- Beneteau 31
- Catalina 310
- Corvette 31
- Douglas 31
- Hunter 31
- Hunter 31-2
- Hunter 310
- Hunter 320
- Marlow-Hunter 31
- Niagara 31
- Tanzer 31
