= Catalina 310 =

Sailboat class

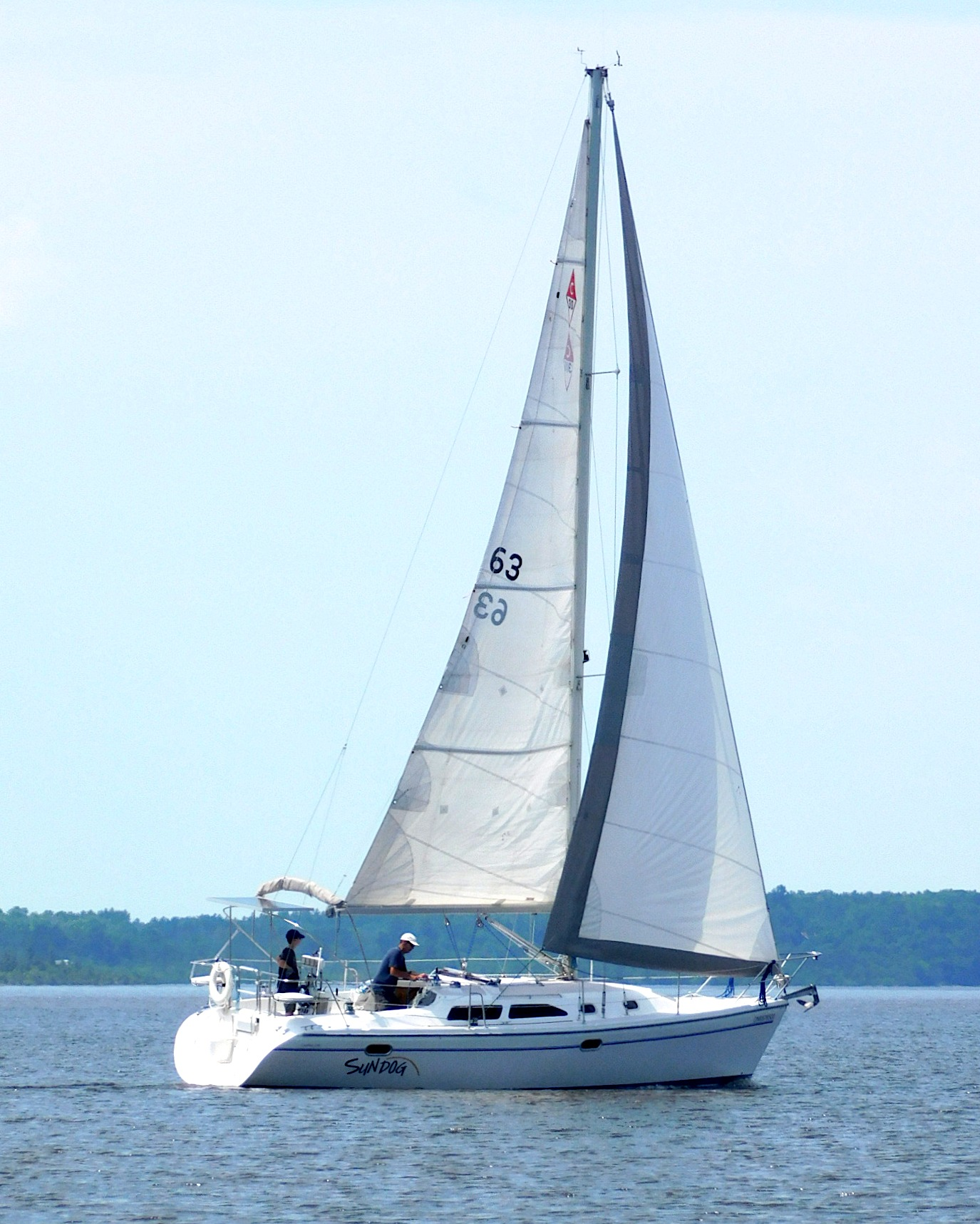

Development
- Designer: Gerry Douglas
- Location: United States
- Year: 1999
- No. built: more than 300
- Builder: Catalina Yachts
- Name: Catalina 310

Boat
- Displacement: 10,300 lb (4,672 kg)
- Draft: 5.75 ft (1.75 m)

Hull
- Type: Monohull
- Construction: Fiberglass
- LOA: 31.00 ft (9.45 m)
- LWL: 26.50 ft (8.08 m)
- Beam: 11.50 ft (3.51 m)
- Engine: Yanmar 3GM30F 27 hp (20 kW) diesel engine

Hull appendages
- Keel: fin keel or wing keel
- Ballast: 4,000 lb (1,814 kg)
- Rudder: internally-mounted spade-type rudder

Rig
- General: Masthead sloop
- I foretriangle height: 42.75 ft (13.03 m)
- J foretriangle base: 11.75 ft (3.58 m)
- P mainsail luff: 37.25 ft (11.35 m)
- E mainsail foot: 13.00 ft (3.96 m)

Sails
- Mainsail area: 242.13 sq ft (22.495 m^{2})
- Jib/genoa area: 251.16 sq ft (23.334 m^{2})
- Total sail area: 493.28 sq ft (45.827 m^{2})

Racing
- PHRF: 171 (average)

The Catalina 310 is an American sailboat, that was designed by Gerry Douglas and first built in 1999.

== Production ==
The boat was built by Catalina Yachts in the United States, with more than 300 examples completed, but it is now out of production. It was replaced in production in 2012 by the Catalina 315.

== Design ==
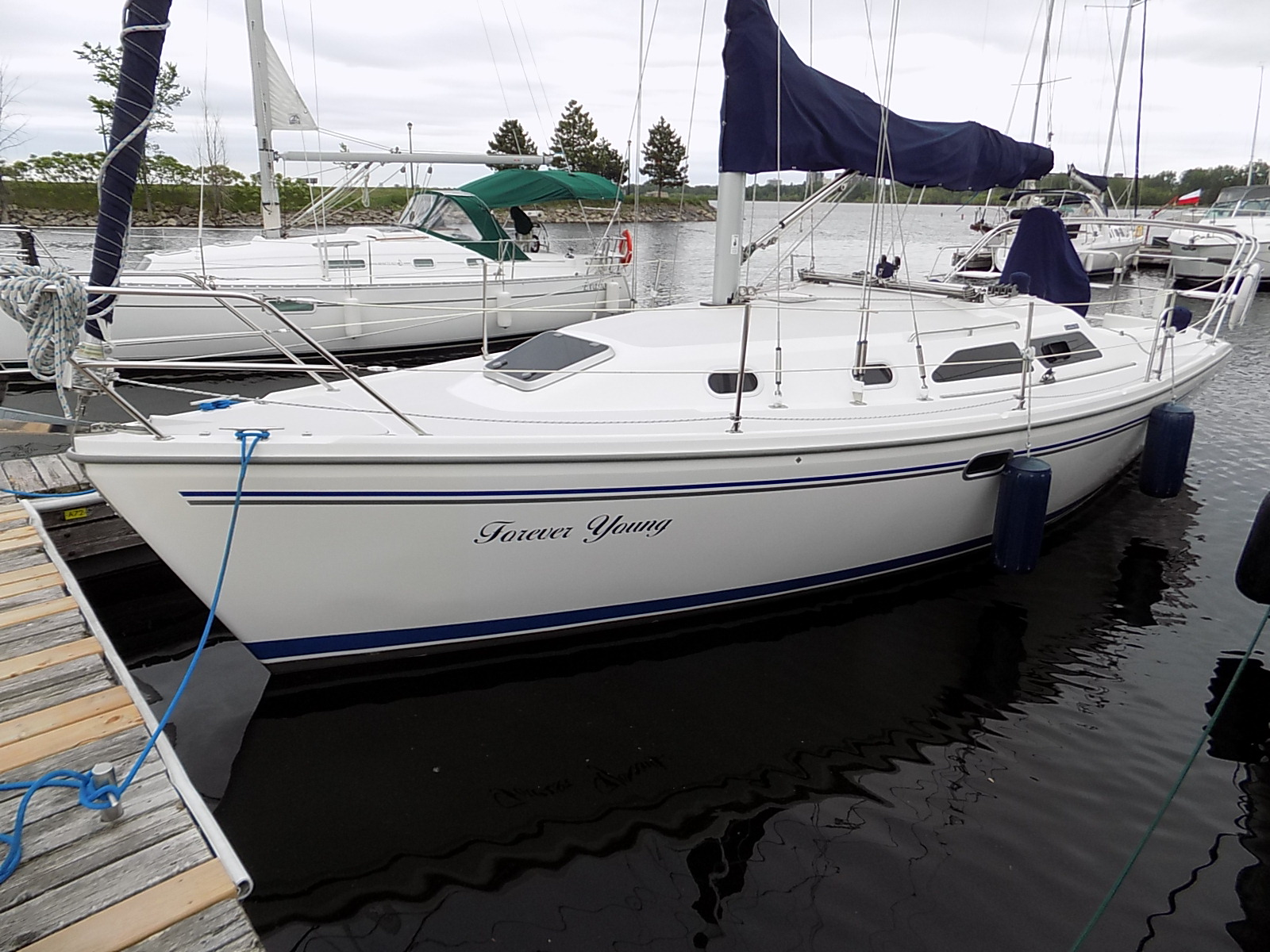
Catalina 310

The Catalina 310 is a small recreational keelboat, built predominantly of fiberglass, with wood trim. It has a masthead sloop rig, an internally-mounted spade-type rudder and a fixed fin keel. It displaces 10,300 lb (4,672 kg) and carries 4,000 lb (1,814 kg) of ballast.

The design has a draft of 5.75 ft (1.75 m) with the standard fin keel fitted and 4.83 ft (1.47 m) with the optional shoal draft wing keel.

The boat is fitted with a Japanese Yanmar 3GM30F diesel engine of 27 hp (20 kW). The fuel tank holds 27 U.S. gallons (100 L; 22 imp gal) and the fresh water tank has a capacity of 35 U.S. gallons (130 L; 29 imp gal).

The boat has a PHRF racing average handicap of 171 with a high of 181 and low of 165. It has a hull speed of 6.9 kn (12.78 km/h).

== Operational history ==
At its introduction, at the February 1999 Atlantic City Boat Show, it was named Cruising World Magazine's Pocket Cruiser Boat of the Year.

In February 2000, the design was named to Sail Magazine's Top 10 sailboats for 2000 list.

== See also ==
- List of sailing boat types

Similar sailboats

- Allmand 31
- Beneteau 31
- Corvette 31
- Douglas 31
- Herreshoff 31
- Hunter 31
- Hunter 31-2
- Hunter 310
- Hunter 320
- Marlow-Hunter 31
- Niagara 31
- Tanzer 31
