= Roue 20 =

Sailboat class

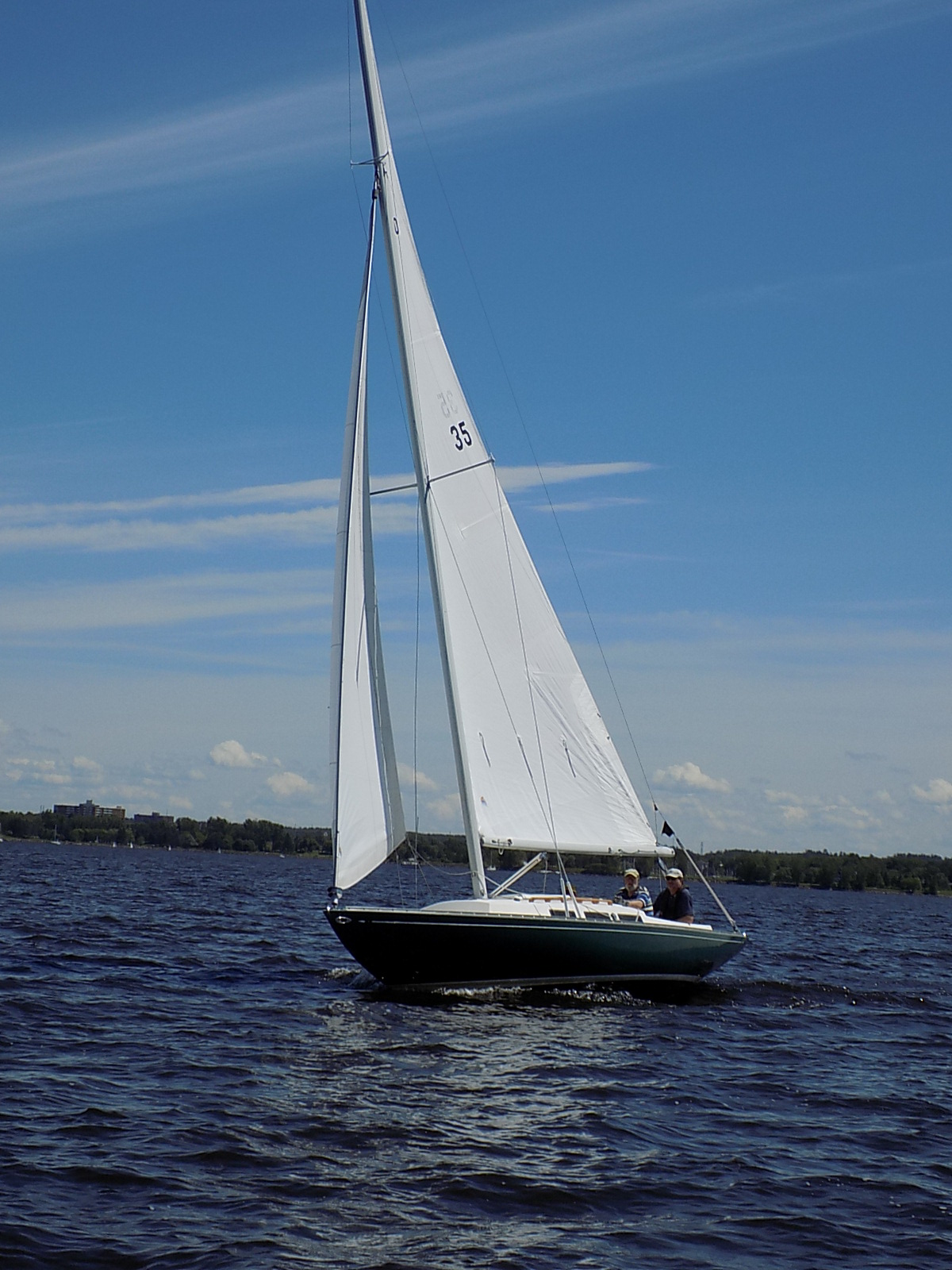

Development
- Designer: William James Roué
- Location: Canada
- Year: 1922
- Name: Roue 20

Boat
- Displacement: 4,700 lb (2,132 kg)
- Draft: 4.2 ft (1.3 m)

Hull
- Type: Monohull
- Construction: Wood (later fiberglass)
- LOA: 31.00 ft (9.45 m)
- LWL: 21.00 ft (6.40 m)
- Beam: 8.00 ft (2.44 m)

Hull appendages
- Keel: long keel
- Rudder: keel-mounted rudder

Rig
- General: Fractional rigged sloop
- I foretriangle height: 26.80 ft (8.17 m)
- J foretriangle base: 9.75 ft (2.97 m)
- P mainsail luff: 35.30 ft (10.76 m)
- E mainsail foot: 14.80 ft (4.51 m)

Sails
- Mainsail area: 261.22 sq ft (24.268 m^{2})
- Jib/genoa area: 20.60 sq ft (1.914 m^{2})
- Total sail area: 381.82 sq ft (35.472 m^{2})

The Roue 20 is a Canadian sailboat, that was designed by William James Roué.

Roué was born in Halifax, Nova Scotia in 1879. He lived in Dartmouth, Nova Scotia and worked from 1899 to 1931 for the family firm, Roué's Carbonated Waters, when he design the boat in 1922.

Most sailboats are named for their imperial or metric length overall, but the Roue 20's designation instead indicates it was William J. Roué's 20th design.

== Design ==
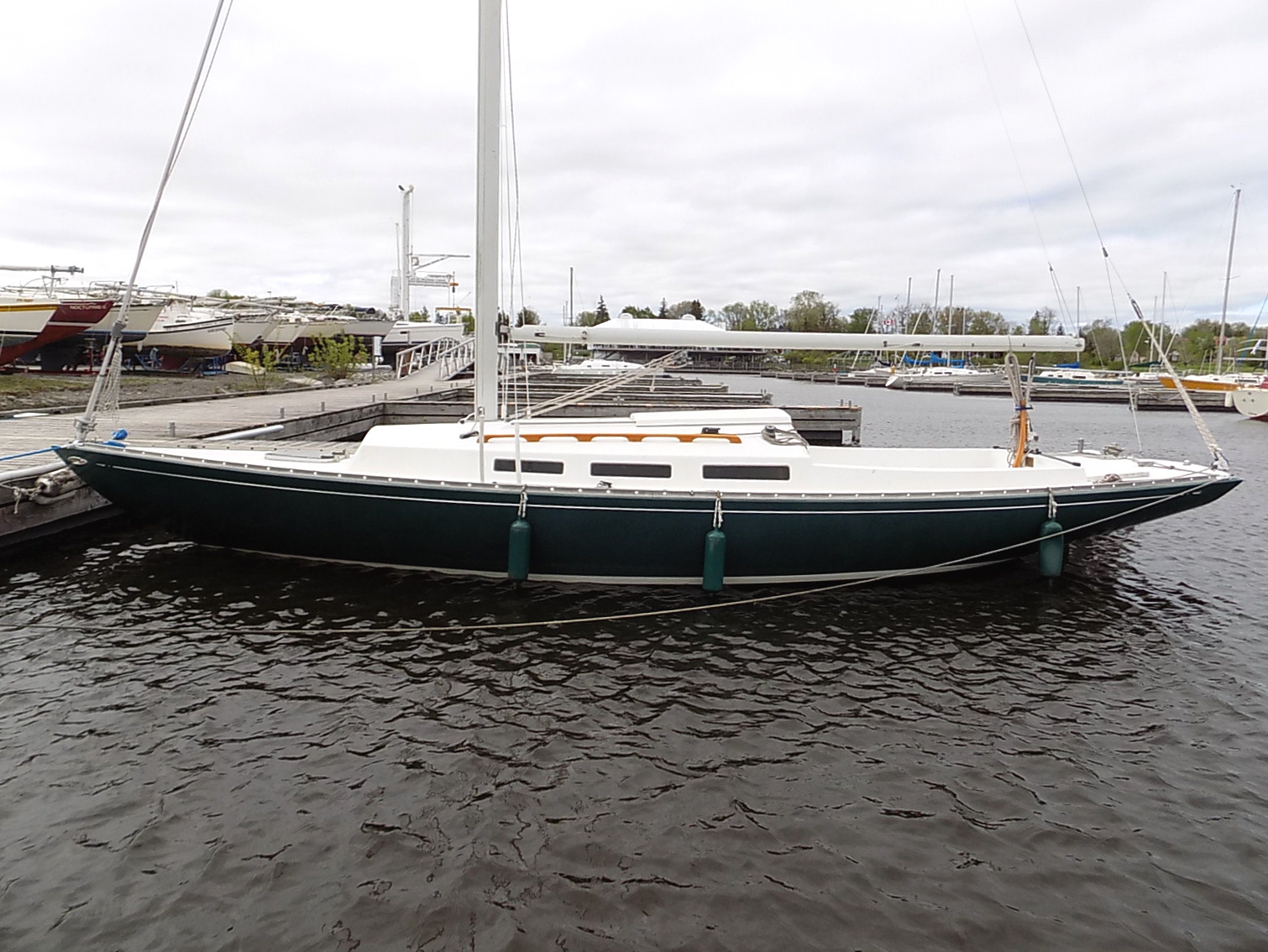
Roue 20

The Roue 20 is a small recreational keelboat, built predominantly of wood, with wood trim, although some newer ones incorporate some fiberglass. It has a fractional sloop rig, a keel-mounted rudder and a fixed long keel. It displaces 4,700 lb (2,132 kg). The boat has a draft of 4.20 ft (1.28 m) with the standard keel.

The design has a hull speed of 6.14 kn (11.37 km/h).

== See also ==
- List of sailing boat types

Related designs

- Bluenose one-design sloop

Similar sailboats

- Beneteau 31
- Corvette 31
- Douglas 31
- Hunter 31
- Hunter 31-2
- Hunter 310
- Hunter 320
- Marlow-Hunter 31
- Tanzer 31
