= Niagara 31 =

Sailboat class designed and built in Canada

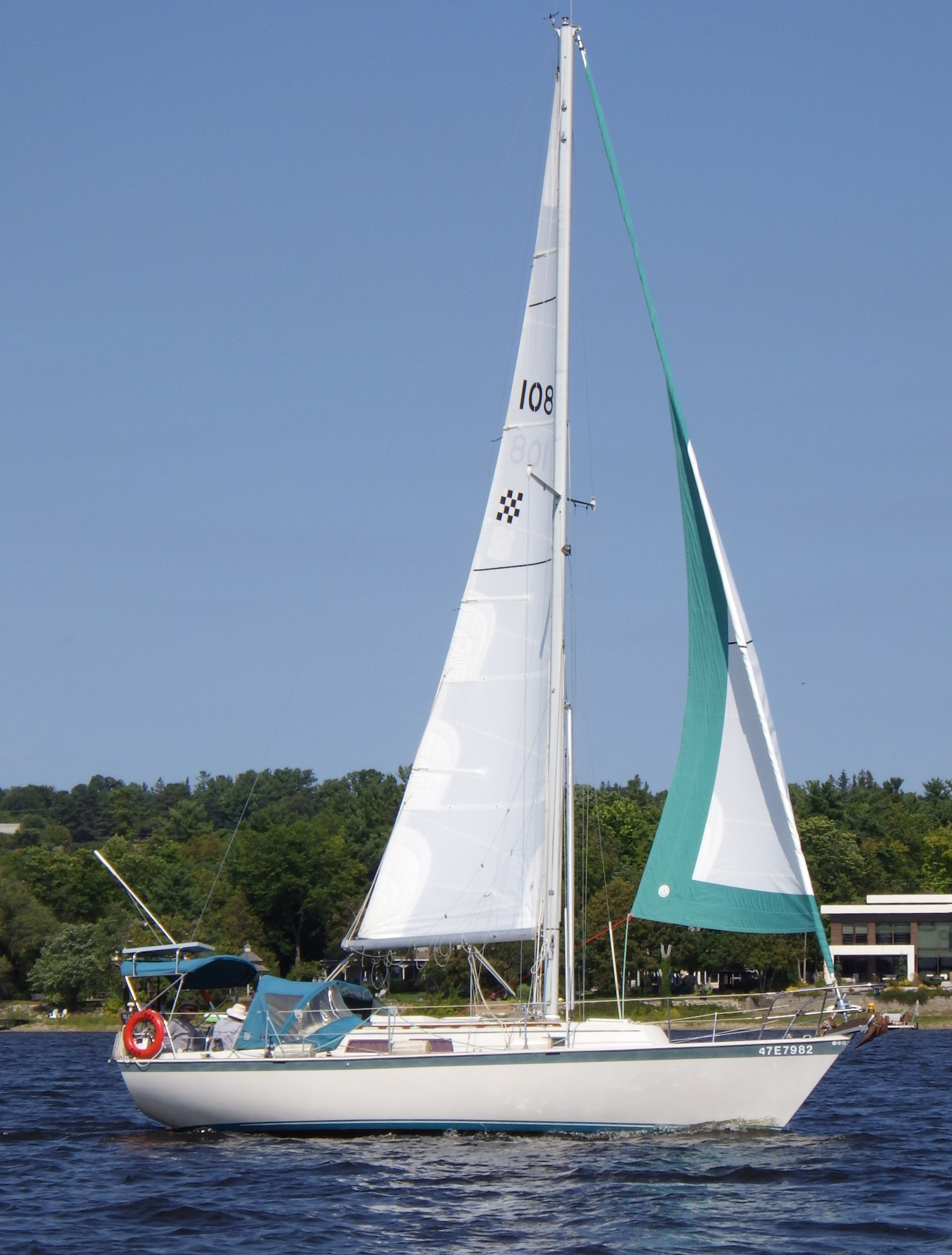

Development
- Designer: Germán Frers
- Location: Canada
- Year: 1977
- Builder: Hinterhoeller Yachts
- Role: Racer-Cruiser
- Name: Niagara 31

Boat
- Displacement: 8,000 lb (3,629 kg)
- Draft: 5.00 ft (1.52 m)

Hull
- Type: Monohull
- Construction: Fibreglass
- LOA: 31.25 ft (9.53 m)
- LWL: 24.25 ft (7.39 m)
- Beam: 10.25 ft (3.12 m)
- Engine: Volvo 13 hp (10 kW) diesel engine

Hull appendages
- Keel: fin keel
- Ballast: 3,550 lb (1,610 kg)
- Rudder: internally-mounted spade-type rudder

Rig
- Rig type: Bermuda rig
- I foretriangle height: 43.00 ft (13.11 m)
- J foretriangle base: 12.40 ft (3.78 m)
- P mainsail luff: 36.00 ft (10.97 m)
- E mainsail foot: 12.50 ft (3.81 m)

Sails
- Sailplan: Masthead sloop
- Mainsail area: 225.00 sq ft (20.903 m^{2})
- Jib/genoa area: 266.60 sq ft (24.768 m^{2})
- Total sail area: 491.60 sq ft (45.671 m^{2})

Racing
- D-PN: 84.0
- PHRF: 156

The Niagara 31 is a Canadian sailboat that was designed by Germán Frers as a racer-cruiser and first built in 1977.

== Production ==
The design was built by Hinterhoeller Yachts in Canada, who completed 100 examples starting in 1977, but it is now out of production.

== Design ==
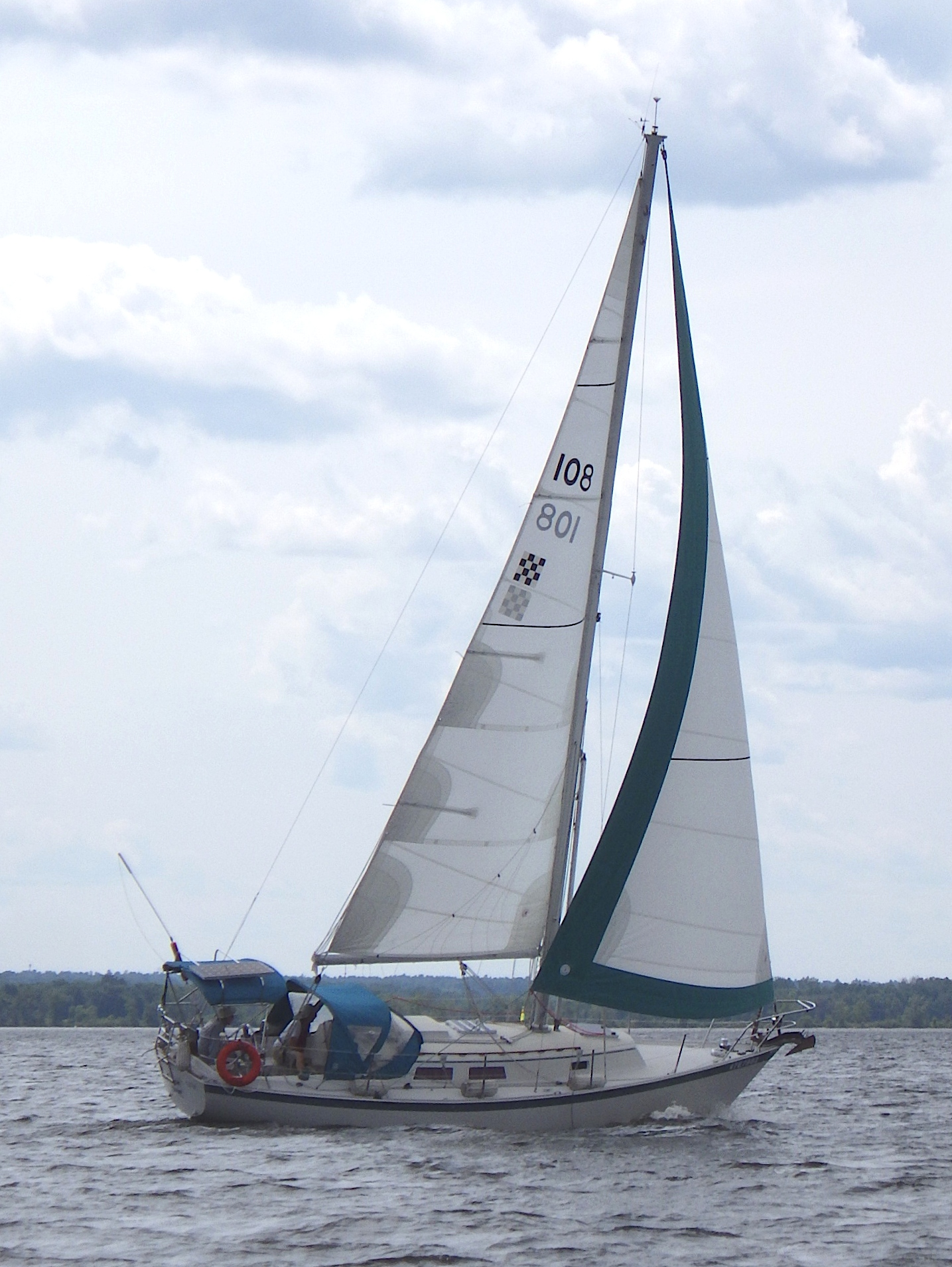
Niagara 31

The Niagara 31 is a recreational keelboat, built predominantly of fiberglass with balsa cores in the deck and hull. It has teak wood trim. It has a masthead sloop rig, a raked stem, a raised transom, an internally mounted spade-type rudder controlled by a wheel and a fixed fin keel. It displaces 8,000 lb (3,629 kg) and carries 3,550 lb (1,610 kg) of ballast.

The boat has a draft of 5.00 ft (1.52 m) with the standard keel fitted.

The boats up to serial number 50 were factory-equipped with a Swedish Volvo diesel engine of 13 hp (10 kW) with a saildrive. Later serial numbers were equipped with a Westerbeke 22 hp (16 kW) diesel with a "V"-drive. The fuel tank holds 22 U.S. gallons (83 L; 18 imp gal) and the fresh water tank has a capacity of 40 U.S. gallons (150 L; 33 imp gal).

The galley is located at the starboard side, at the bottom of the companionway stairs and includes a two-burner propane stove. The icebox is located on the port side, in the aft section of the navigation station. The navigation station seat and table both stow out of the way when not in use. The head is located forward, just aft of the bow "V"-berth and is separated from the main and forward cabins by folding doors. The head has a shower with a teak grating. Additional sleeping accommodation includes two main cabin settee berths, the port one a double berth. The interior is predominantly teak with varnished pine trim.

Ventilation is provided by two translucent hatches, one in the bow cabin and one in the main cabin. Of the six ports, four are fixed and two open.

The genoa has sheet tracks and two coaming-mounted winches. An additional coach house roof winch is provided for the halyards. The 4:1 mainsheet is mounted mid-cockpit. Additional winches are provided for reefing. There is a Cunningham, outhaul and boom vang

The design has a PHRF racing average handicap of 156 and a Portsmouth Yardstick handicap of 84.0.

== Operational history ==
In a review Michael McGoldrick wrote, "despite its placid cruising exterior, the Niagara 31 offers some very good performance. This confirmed by its PHRF rating of 156, compared, for example, to the Aloha 32's rating of 171 (faster boats have lower PHRF numbers). The only drawback with the Niagara 31 is that it is a little more tender than most cruising boats in its size range."

Reviewer Richard Sherwood wrote of the design, "Beam is moderate and the hull is V-form. Design is modern, with a fin keel and semibalanced rudder. While this is a tall rig, the foretriangle is not excessively large, and handling of foresails is reduced."

A review in Practical Sailor noted, "when it comes to performance, the 31 excels. Thanks to its big sloop rig with 492 square feet of sail, it does nicely in light airs. This also means reefing is required earlier—most owners say at about 15 knots. And nearly all said so. Owners also report that the boat sails exceptionally well on all points; she's stable, well-balanced and quick. 'Will outpoint most racer-cruisers,' said the owner of a 1993 model. Another said, 'This is a technical cruiser/racer, not for the beginner.'"

== See also ==
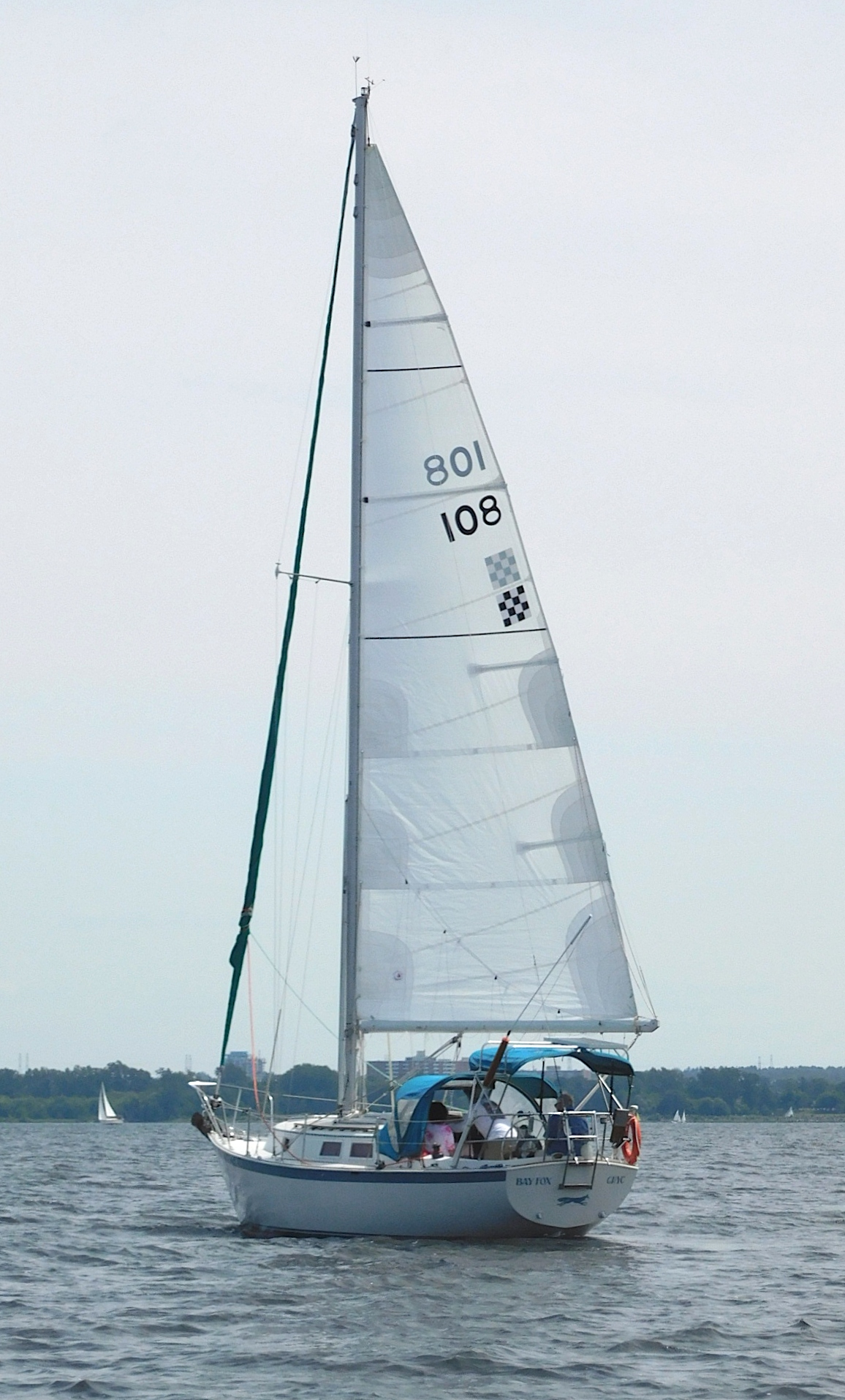
Niagara 31

- List of sailing boat types

Related development

- Niagara 35

Similar sailboats

- Allmand 31
- Beneteau 31
- Catalina 310
- Corvette 31
- Douglas 31
- Herreshoff 31
- Hunter 31
- Hunter 31-2
- Hunter 310
- Hunter 320
- Marlow-Hunter 31
- Tanzer 31
