= Corvette 31 =

Sailboat class

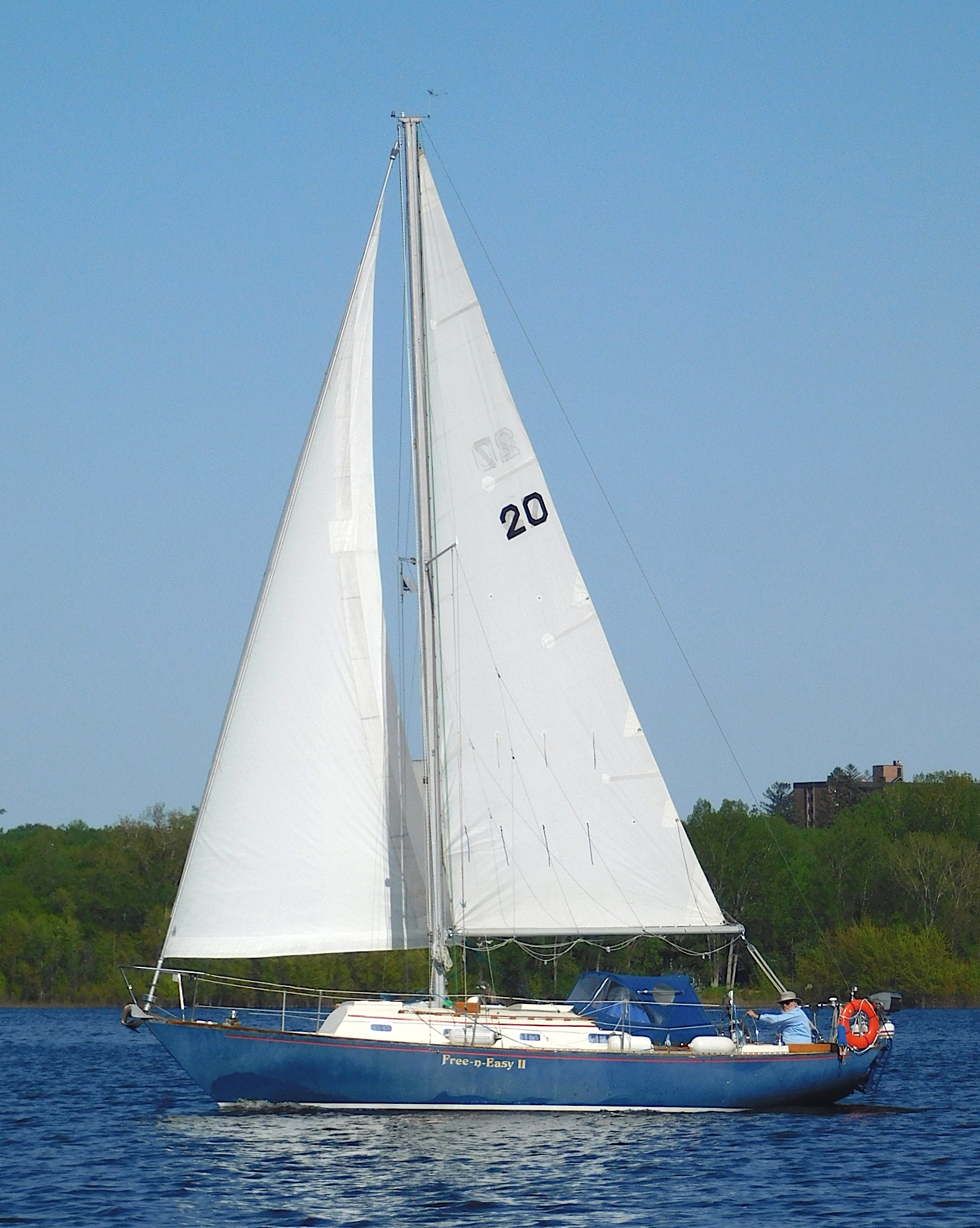

Development
- Designer: C&C Design
- Location: Canada
- Year: 1965 (designed)
- No. built: 171
- Builder: C&C Yachts at the Belleville Marine Yard (Morch Marine)
- Name: Corvette 31

Boat
- Displacement: 8,545 lb (3,876 kg)
- Draft: 7.00 ft (2.13 m) centreboard down

Hull
- Type: Monohull
- Construction: Fiberglass
- LOA: 31.16 ft (9.50 m)
- LWL: 22.50 ft (6.86 m)
- Beam: 9.08 ft (2.77 m)
- Engine: Universal Atomic 4 gasoline engine

Hull appendages
- Keel: long keel with centreboard
- Ballast: 4,000 lb (1,814 kg)
- Rudder: keel-mounted rudder

Rig
- General: Masthead sloop
- I foretriangle height: 37.00 ft (11.28 m)
- J foretriangle base: 12.00 ft (3.66 m)
- P mainsail luff: 31.75 ft (9.68 m)
- E mainsail foot: 14.00 ft (4.27 m)

Sails
- Mainsail area: 222.25 sq ft (20.648 m^{2})
- Jib/genoa area: 222.00 sq ft (20.624 m^{2})
- Total sail area: 444.25 sq ft (41.272 m^{2})

The Corvette 31 is a Canadian sailboat, which was designed by C&C Design in 1965. The type is named in honour of the Corvette warship class.

== Production ==
The boat was built by C&C Yachts at their Belleville Marine Yard (Morch Marine) in Belleville, Ontario Canada. Between the start of production in 1966 and production end in 1971. Some sources claim a total of 171 examples were completed, while others say 167.

In production year 1968/69, 41 examples were completed and in 1969/70 production peaked at 52 completed. Productions plans for another 52 to be built in 1970/71 were cancelled when the Belleville facility was closed and production ended.

The design sold well in its home waters of the Bay of Quinte and also in Montreal and the Chesapeake Bay region of the United States. The initial price in 1966 was $12,500.

== Design ==
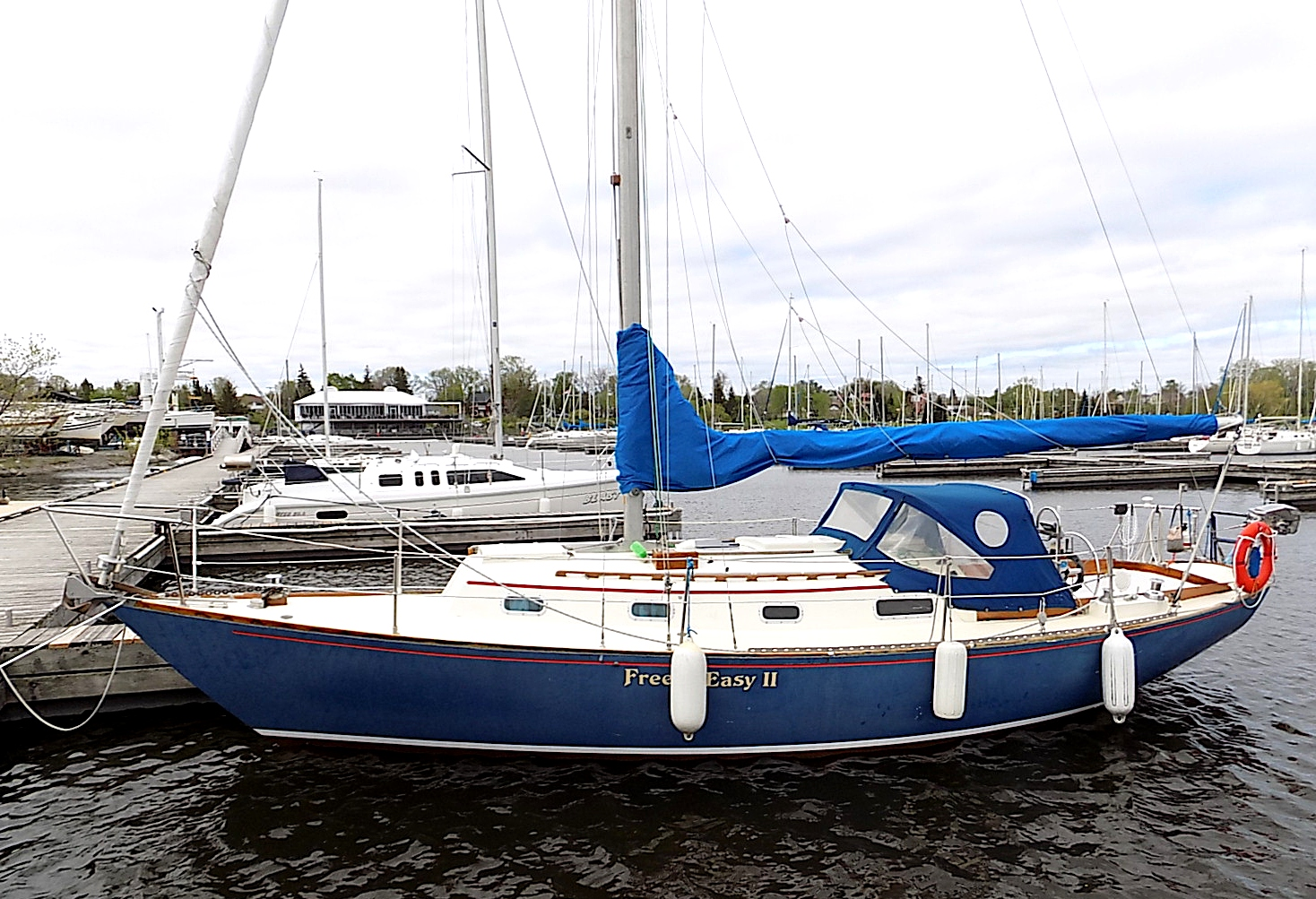
Corvette 31 with a cockpit dodger fitted

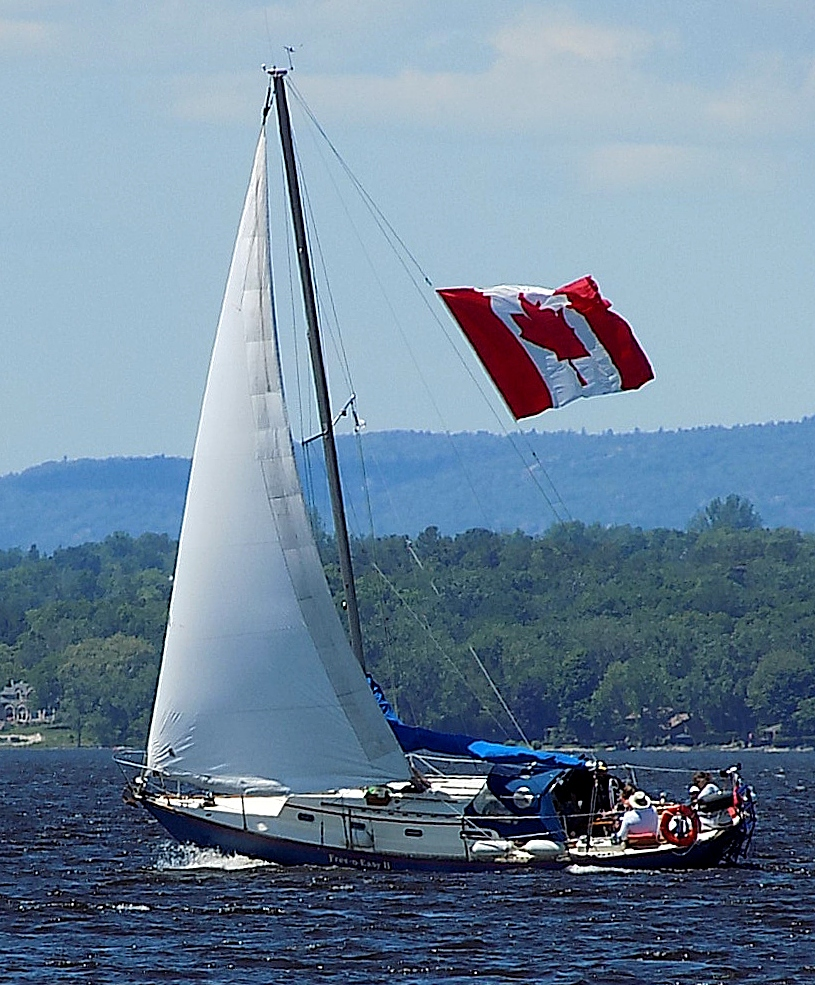
Corvette 31

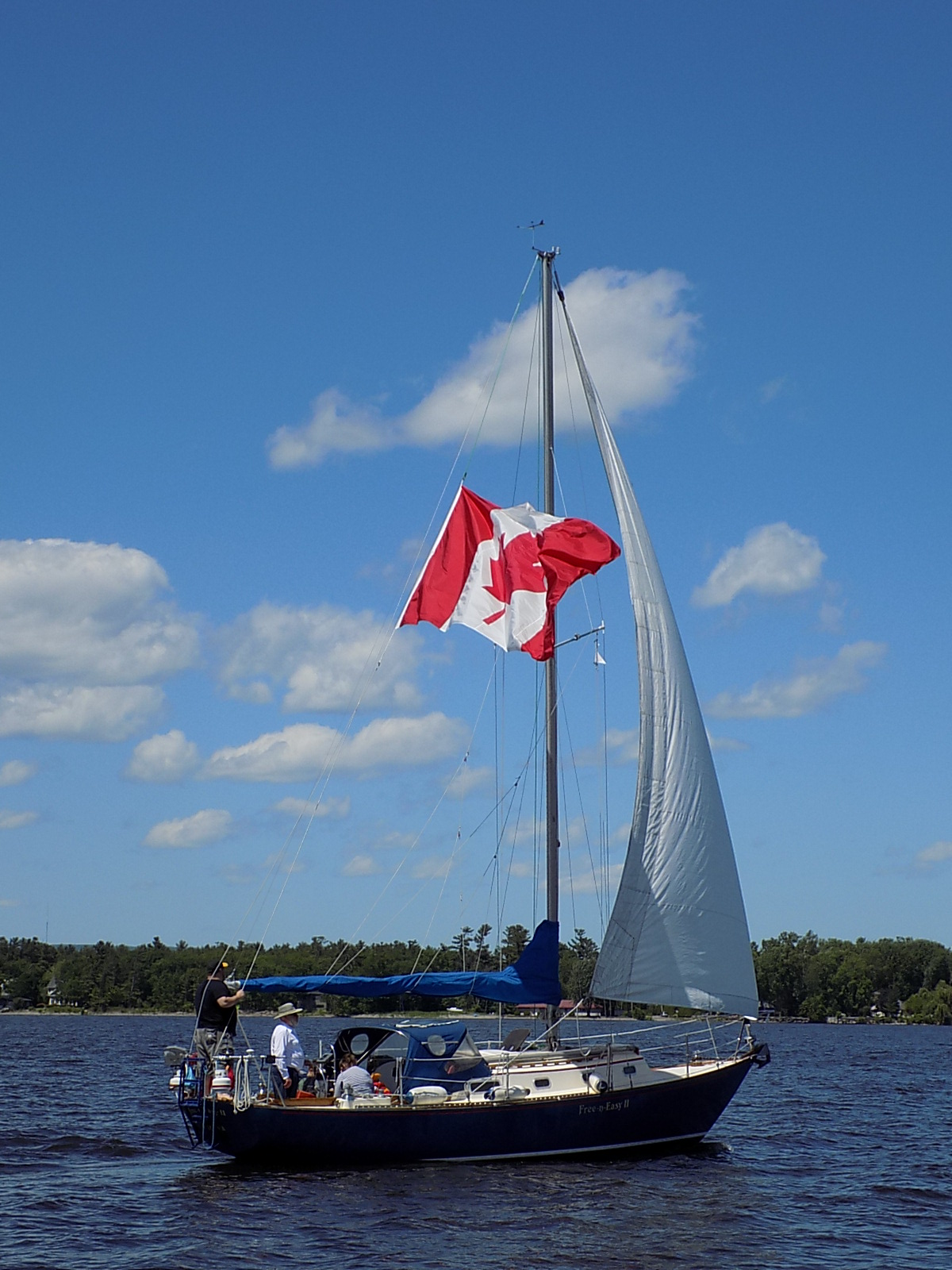
Corvette 31

The Corvette was designed to a Cruising Club of America Southern Ocean Racing Conference (S.O.R.C.) rule that resulted in boats with a heavy displacement and a shoal draft. The design was named the corvette by Ian Morch, owner of Morch Marine, in honour of the Second World War Flower-class corvettes operated by the Royal Canadian Navy on convoy escort duty.

The Corvette 31 is a small recreational sailboat, built predominantly of fiberglass, with wood trim. It has a masthead sloop rig, a keel mounted rudder on a fixed long keel, with a retractable centreboard. It displaces 8,545 lb (3,876 kg) and carries 4,000 lb (1,814 kg) of ballast.

The boat has a draft of 7.00 ft (2.13 m) with the centreboard extended and 3.25 ft (0.99 m) with it retracted.

The boat was factory-equipped with a Universal Atomic 4 gasoline engine, although some were subsequently owner-equipped with diesel engines. The design has a hull speed of 6.36 kn (11.78 km/h).

The Corvette Sailboat Association describes the design:

The Corvette was one of the first very successful boats the company designed. It is a boat than can be used to cruise in coastal waters, while also being suitable to sail across the ocean. It features full, but basic, amenities and can sleep up to five aboard ... The Corvette is a very fine looking, comfortable, and seaworthy boat that has a very loyal following.

== Operational history ==
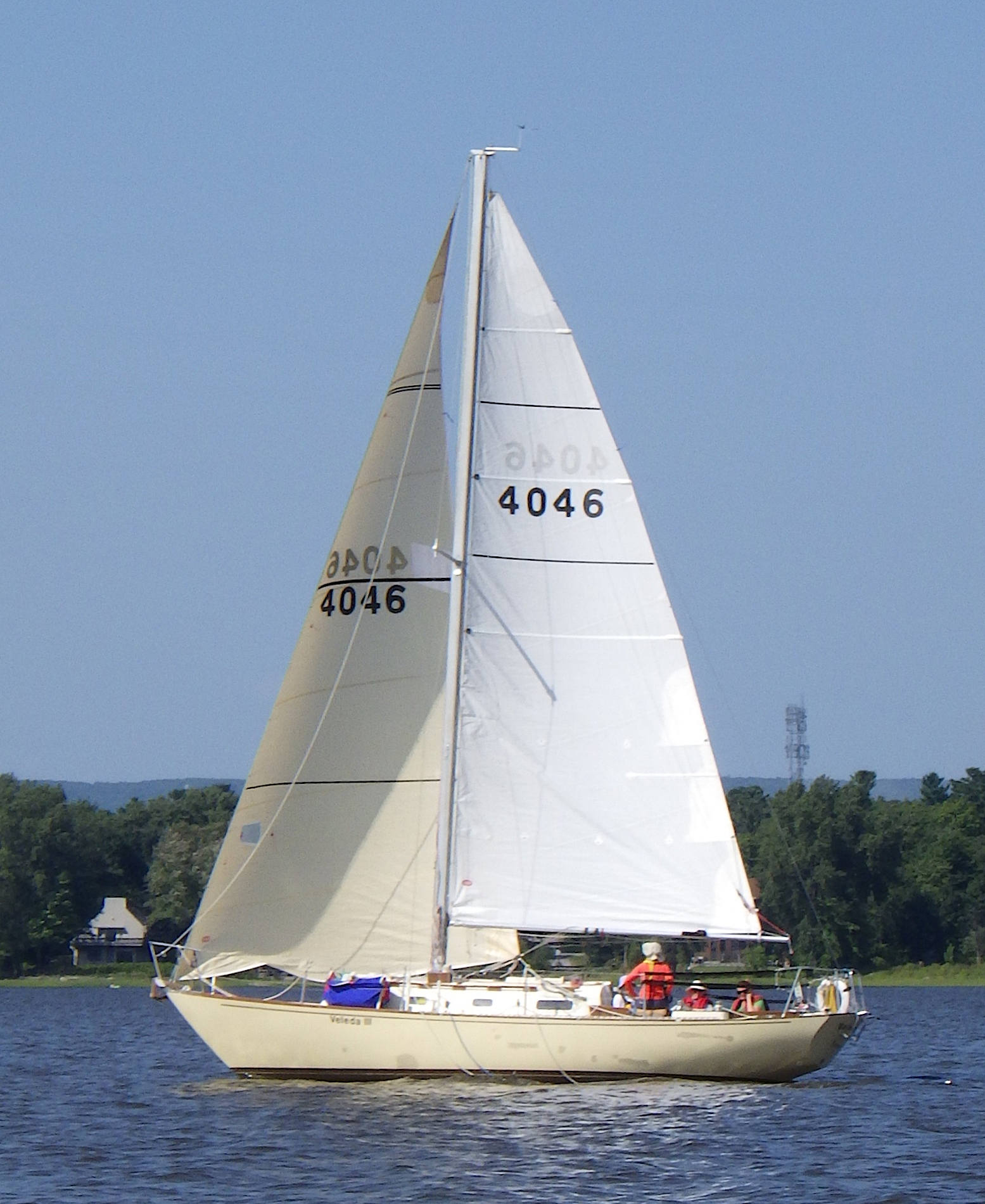
Corvette 31

In the first race it was entered in, the 1968 Lipton Cup Race held in the Atlantic waters off Miami, Florida, a Corvette 31 named Elektra II, crewed by builder Ian Morch as skipper, designer George Cuthberston, George Hinterhoeller, and Laser designer Bruce Kirby, finished first in the Class D and 24th overall out of a fleet of more than 100 boats.

In the 1968 Miami-Nassau race of 184 nmi (341 km) Elektra II finished second in Class D and second overall.

In the 1968 Governor's Cup race, off Nassau in 25 kn (46 km/h) of wind, Elektra II finished first in its class.

In a review Michael McGoldrick wrote, "The Corvette 31 was designed in 1965 and most were built in the late 1960s. This is one of the boats that helped establish C&C as a household name in the Canadian boating industry. These boats have a graceful traditional look about them, and they continue to enjoy a loyal following. The Corvette has a retractable keel incorporated into its full keel. With the swing keel all the way up, the Corvette only draws 3'3" (1m), making it an excellent boat for shallow water areas. It has a very livable interior, but it is a little small when compared to later designs....this boat was named after the Canadian navy's Corvette which became famous for providing convoy escort in the North Atlantic during World War II."

== See also ==
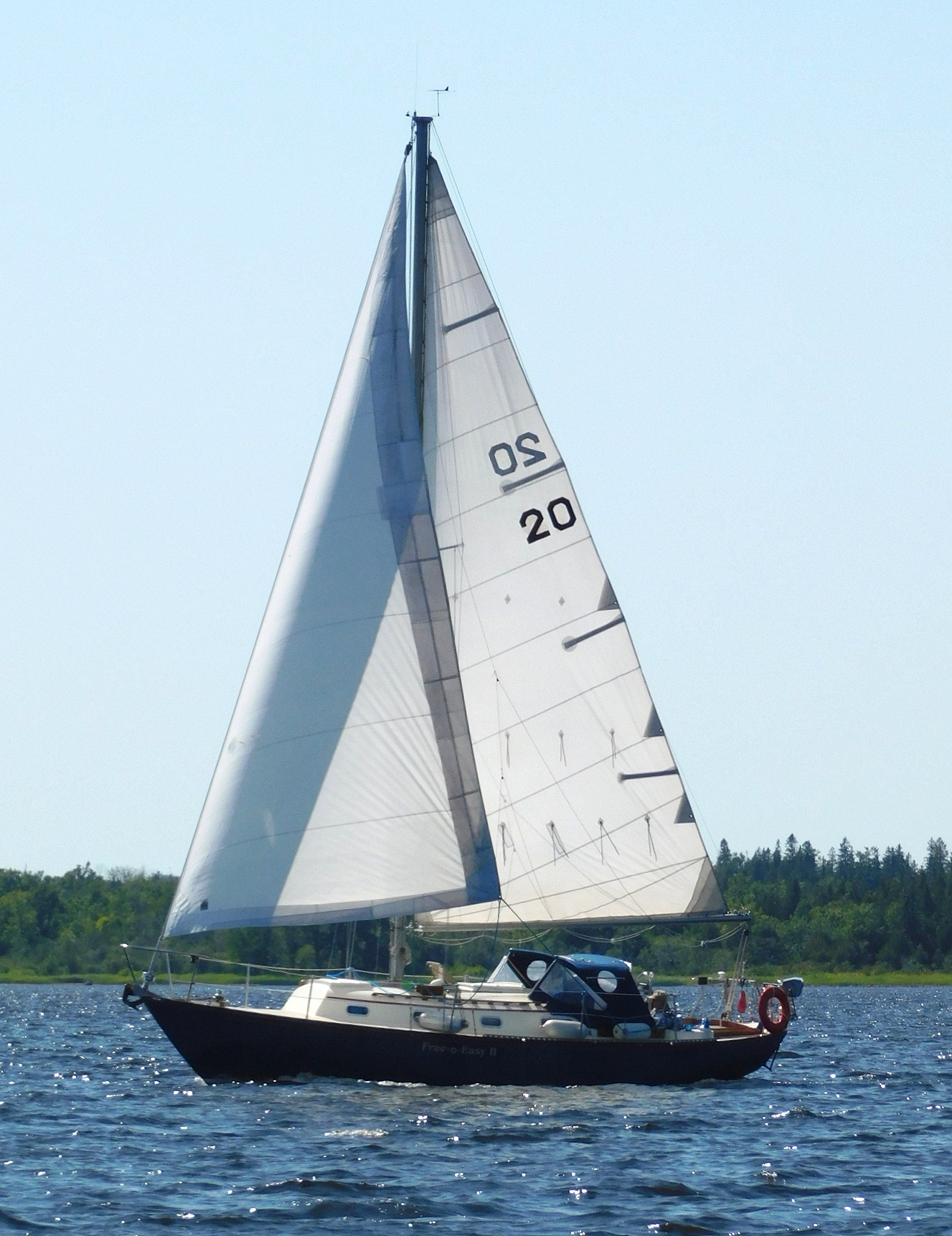
Corvette 31

- List of sailing boat types

Related development

- Frigate 36

Similar sailboats

- Allmand 31
- B-Boats B-32
- Beneteau 31
- Catalina 310
- Herreshoff 31
- Hunter 31
- Hunter 31-2
- Hunter 32
- Hunter 310
- Hunter 320
- J/32
- Marlow-Hunter 31
- Niagara 31
- Roue 20
