= Hunter 320 =

Sailboat class

Development
- Designer: Hunter Design Team
- Location: United States
- Year: 2000
- Builder: Hunter Marine
- Name: Hunter 320

Boat
- Displacement: 8,550 lb (3,878 kg)
- Draft: 5.83 ft (1.78 m)

Hull
- Type: Monohull
- Construction: Fiberglass
- LOA: 31.58 ft (9.63 m)
- LWL: 28.33 ft (8.63 m)
- Beam: 10.83 ft (3.30 m)
- Engine: Yanmar 18 hp (13 kW) diesel engine

Hull appendages
- Keel: fin keel
- Ballast: 3,200 lb (1,451 kg)
- Rudder: internally-mounted spade-type rudder

Rig
- Rig type: Bermuda rig
- I foretriangle height: 36.83 ft (11.23 m)
- J foretriangle base: 12.00 ft (3.66 m)
- P mainsail luff: 34.32 ft (10.46 m)
- E mainsail foot: 12.58 ft (3.83 m)

Sails
- Sailplan: Fractional B&R rigged sloop
- Mainsail area: 215.87 sq ft (20.055 m^{2})
- Jib/genoa area: 220.98 sq ft (20.530 m^{2})
- Total sail area: 436.85 sq ft (40.585 m^{2})

Racing
- PHRF: 168 (average)

The Hunter 320 is an American sailboat that was designed by the Hunter Design Team and first built in 2000.

The 320 is a development of the 1997 Hunter 310.

== Production ==
The design was built by Hunter Marine in the United States between 2000 and 2002, but it is now out of production.

== Design ==
The Hunter 320 is a recreational keelboat, built predominantly of fiberglass. It has a fractional sloop B&R rig, a raked stem, a walk-through reverse transom, an internally-mounted spade-type rudder controlled by a wheel and a fixed fin keel. It displaces 8,550 lb (3,878 kg) and carries 3,200 lb (1,451 kg) of ballast.

The boat has a draft of 5.83 ft (1.78 m) with the standard keel and 4.33 ft (1.32 m) with the optional shoal draft keel.

The boat is fitted with a Japanese Yanmar diesel engine of 18 hp (13 kW). The fuel tank holds 28 U.S. gallons (110 L; 23 imp gal) and the fresh water tank has a capacity of 50 U.S. gallons (190 L; 42 imp gal).

The factory-supplied standard equipment included: 110% roller furling genoa, two-speed self-tailing winches, over-cockpit stainless steel arch-mounted mainsheet, dorade vents, marine VHF radio, knotmeter, depth sounder, hardwood cabin sole, private forward and aft cabins, dinette table that converts to a double berth, chart table, microwave oven, stainless steel sink, two-burner liquefied petroleum gas stove, icebox, anchor four life jackets, hand-held flares and an emergency tiller. Available options included: spinnaker and associated winches, mast-furling mainsail, stainless steel hand rails, autopilot, electric anchor winch and a mainsheet traveller.

The design has a PHRF racing average handicap of 168 with a high of 156 and low of 174. It has a hull speed of 7.13 kn (13.20 km/h).

== Operational history ==
In a review for Boats.com, Roger Marshal wrote, "At first glance, the Hunter 320 looks like a normal 32-footer on steroids. It is a big, bulky boat made seemingly even larger by the rounded cockpit and transom step. But walk below and you immediately lose the feeling of bulk. The interior is huge and plush. Beam is carried well aft, giving a transverse doubled berth under the cockpit. The boat has every attribute that you would want in a 32-footer and then some." Marshall concludes, "In all, this is a boat that fulfills its function easily and capably but not one that you would sail long distances offshore in. The boat comes across as a good coastal cruiser that can carry a family and a few friends from port to port."

== See also ==
- List of sailing boat types

Related development

- Hunter 31
- Hunter 310

Similar sailboats

- Allmand 31
- Beneteau 31
- Catalina 310
- Corvette 31
- Douglas 31
- Herreshoff 31
- Marlow-Hunter 31
- Niagara 31
- Roue 20
- Tanzer 31
