= Marlow-Hunter 31 =

Sailboat class

Development
- Designer: Glenn Henderson
- Location: United States
- Year: 2015
- Builder: Hunter Marine
- Name: Marlow-Hunter 31

Boat
- Displacement: 11,854 lb (5,377 kg)
- Draft: 5.41 ft (1.65 m)

Hull
- Type: Monohull
- Construction: Fiberglass
- LOA: 32.35 ft (9.86 m)
- LWL: 29.66 ft (9.04 m)
- Beam: 11.84 ft (3.61 m)
- Engine: Yanmar3YM20 21 hp (16 kW) diesel engine

Hull appendages
- Keel: fin keel with a weighted bulb
- Ballast: 3,380 lb (1,533 kg)
- Rudder: internally-mounted spade-type rudder

Rig
- Rig type: Bermuda rig
- I foretriangle height: 35.76 ft (10.90 m)
- J foretriangle base: 11.25 ft (3.43 m)
- P mainsail luff: 36.46 ft (11.11 m)
- E mainsail foot: 13.83 ft (4.22 m)

Sails
- Sailplan: Fractional B&R rigged sloop
- Total sail area: 581.00 sq ft (53.977 m^{2})

The Marlow-Hunter 31 is an American sailboat that was designed by Glenn Henderson as a cruiser and first built in 2015.

The design is sometimes confused with the 1983 Hunter 31 and the 2006 Hunter 31-2, which was also marketed as the Hunter 31.

== Production ==
The design was built by Hunter Marine in the United States, starting in 2015 and remained in production through 2019.

== Design ==
The Marlow-Hunter 31 is a recreational keelboat, built predominantly of fiberglass. The hull and deck and made from a vinyl ester resin with continuous reinforcement fibers, reinforced with Nida honeycomb cores and Kevlar in the forward hull for collision protection. It has a fractional sloop B&R rig, a mainsheet traveler mounted on a stainless steel arch, a nearly plumb stem, a reverse transom with a fold-down swimming platform and folding ladder, an internally mounted spade-type rudder controlled by a laterally-tilting wheel and a fixed fin keel or shoal draft keel. With standard fin keel it displaces 11,854 lb (5,377 kg) and carries 3,380 lb (1,533 kg) of ballast, while the shoal draft model displaces 12,000 lb (5,443 kg) and carries 3,525 lb (1,599 kg) of ballast.

The boat has a draft of 5.41 ft (1.65 m) with the standard keel and 4.50 ft (1.37 m) with the optional shoal draft keel.

The steering wheel can be set in port, center or starboard positions by use of a foot locking lever, as desired by the helmsman. This provides the advantages of a dual-wheel configuration, but occupies less cockpit space. The wheel also folds when not in use.

The boat is fitted with a Yanmar 3YM20 diesel engine of 21 hp (16 kW), with a 29 hp (22 kW) engine optional. A sail drive is also optional. The fuel tank holds 21 U.S. gallons (79 L; 17 imp gal) and the fresh water tank has a capacity of 50 U.S. gallons (190 L; 42 imp gal). The holding tank has a capacity of 20 U.S. gallons (76 L; 17 imp gal).

Factory standard equipment includes a teak interior, Corian countertops, microwave oven, refrigerator, freezer, two-burner propane stove and oven, fully enclosed head with separate shower, LED lighting, knotmeter, depth sounder. Headroom below decks is 73 ft (2,225 cm). A roller furling jib and mast-furling mainsail are optional.

== Operational history ==
Writing for Sailing magazine in March 2015, famed yacht designer Robert Perry, was not impressed with the styling, describing this genre of boat "as looking like 'the box the boat came in.'" He describes the compromises, "It's not a bad trend if interior volume is what you are after. The new Marlow-Hunter 31 has an interior that would have been impressive even on a 40-footer 30 years ago. For a lot of buyers, interior comfort trumps performance. But in the hands of a skilled designer, performance can still be attained. Maybe not race boat performance, but respectable cruising boat performance is possible." He concluded with faint praise for the design, "I think this would be a great boat to introduce a young family to the joys of sailing and cruising."

Sven Donaldson, writing in Pacific Yacht Magazine in May 2015, concluded, "For a sailboat that fits in a 32-foot slip, it’s hard to envision a more spacious, liveable package than the new MH-31. It’s not for everyone, of course. There will be some who prefer a stronger bias toward the sailing side of the equation. On the other hand, it’s certainly no slouch under sail."

Great Lakes Boating magazine published a review in the summer of 2015, saying, "The Marlow-Hunter 31 uses a well-proven hull design to rival most 34-foot models. The 30-foot foot waterline outclasses most boats, and when combined with her Henderson/Marlow chined hull, it offers off-shore stability and performance that few can match. At low angles of heel and as the wind freshens, the Marlow/Henderson hull provides superior stability and performance."

In a review in Canadian Yachting in May 2016, Simon Hill, praised the interior accommodations. Of the sailing qualities, he wrote, "When some breeze appeared it was easy to deploy the furling sails, and we were quickly able to get the boat moving at nearly three knots in wind that was topping out at about four knots, tacking upwind without difficulty despite the light conditions. The true test of a slippery hull form is how well it accelerates, and the MH 31 proved quick to build speed in even the slightest pull, and equally quick to respond to the helm."

== See also ==
- List of sailing boat types

Similar sailboats

- Allmand 31
- Beneteau 31
- Catalina 310
- Corvette 31
- Douglas 31
- Herreshoff 31
- Hunter 31
- Hunter 310
- Hunter 320
- Niagara 31
- Roue 20
- Tanzer 31
