= William James Roué =

Canadian naval architect (1879–1970)

- Born: 27 April 1879; Halifax, Nova Scotia, Canada
- Died: 14 January 1970 (aged 90); Halifax, Nova Scotia, Canada
- Occupation: Naval architect
- Known for: Designer of the fishing schooner Bluenose

William James Roué (April 27, 1879 – January 14, 1970) was a naval architect famous for his design of the fishing schooner Bluenose, which sailed to victory in the Halifax Herald International Fisherman's competition in 1921, 1922, 1923, 1931 and 1938, and held the record for the largest catch of fish ever brought into Lunenburg, Nova Scotia.

== History ==
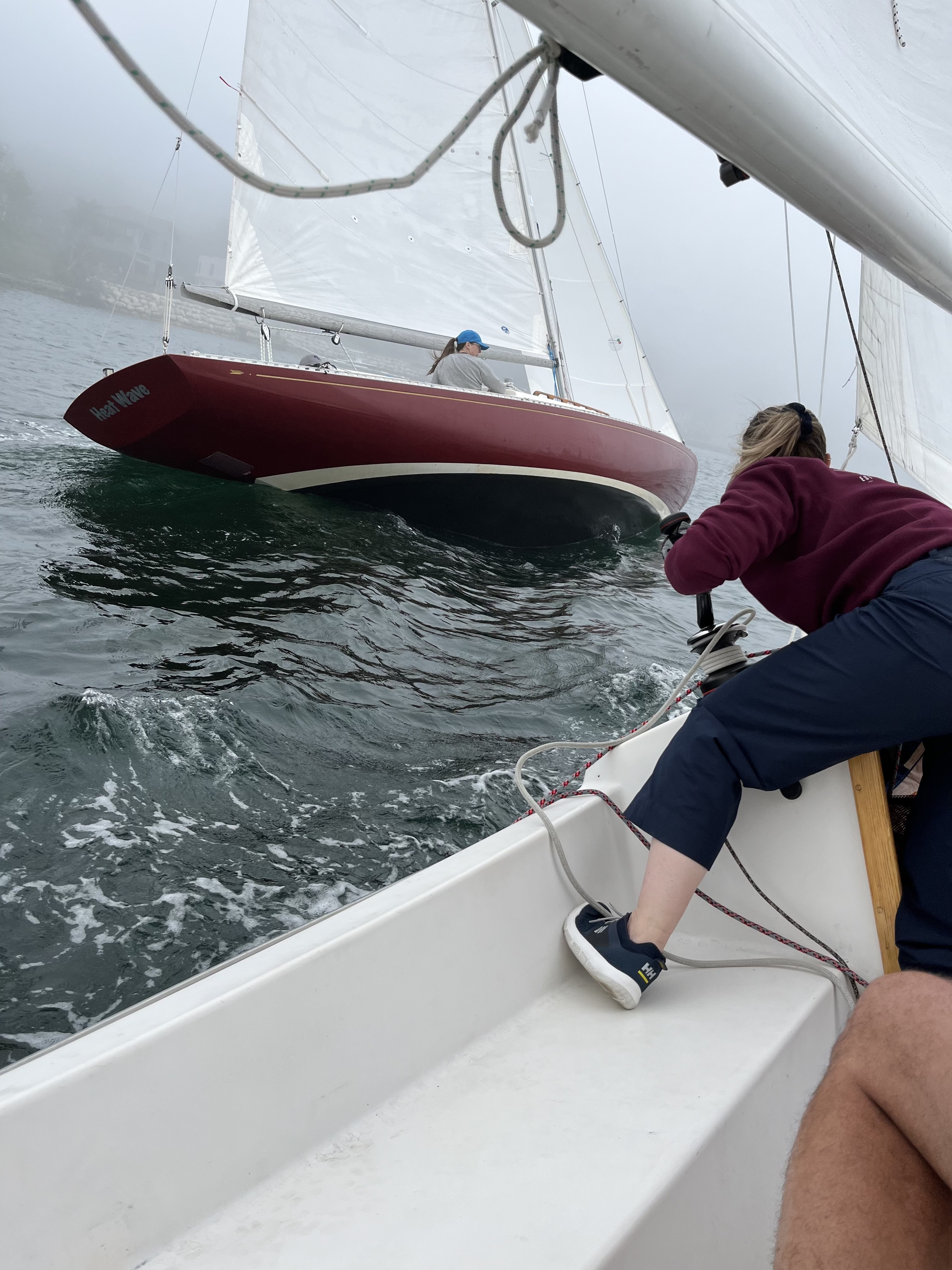
Roue 20 races, Armdale Yacht Club, Nova Scotia, 2022

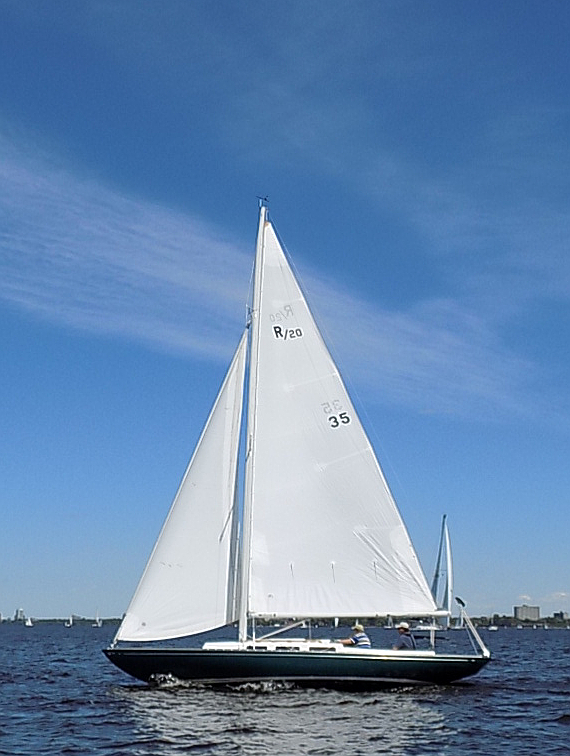
Roue 20

Roué was born in the South End of Halifax, Nova Scotia. As an adolescent, Roué made and sailed 1.5-metre (4 ft 11 in) model boats. He learned to crew at the Royal Nova Scotia Yacht Squadron (RNSYS). He was a self-taught naval architect. He read volumes on boat design in the library of the Yacht Squadron. He enrolled in classes in mechanical drafting at the Victoria College of Art and Design, now the Nova Scotia College of Art and Design. His experience was that of a yacht designer for fellow members of the Squadron while he worked in the family soft-drink business. Roué created more than 100 designs for commercial vessels, including many yachts such as the schooner Blue Dolphin; two fleets of freighters for Newfoundland and the Arctic and ferries. Roué died on January 14, 1970, in Halifax at the age of 90. In 1943, during the Second World War, William Roué invented a sectional barge capable of being loaded disassembled on the deck of a ship and then reassembled to land troops and supplies.

== Honours ==
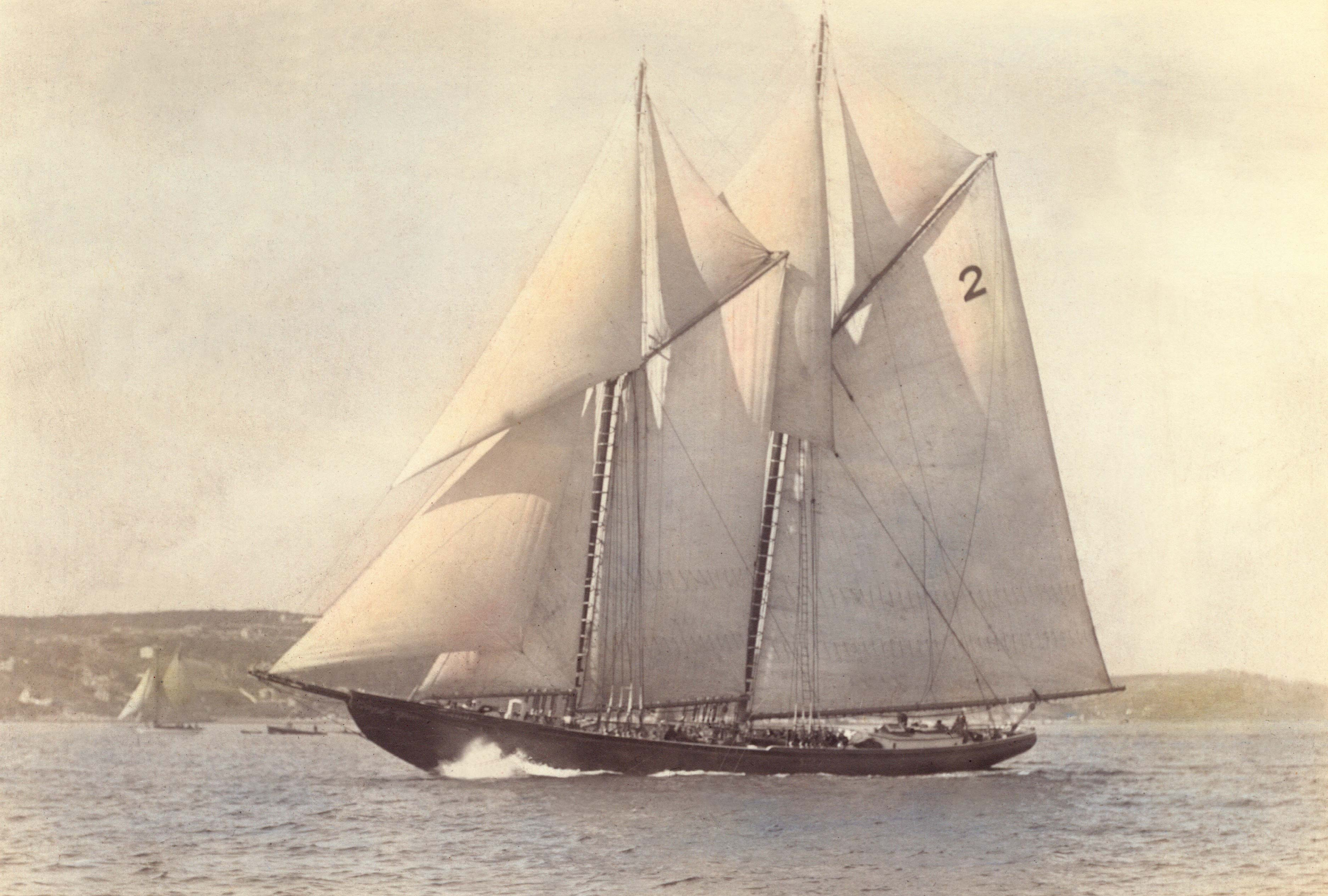
Bluenose

In 1921, Roué was rewarded with a gold watch and commemorative scroll because Canada won the International Fisherman's Race.

A 1998 domestic postage stamp was issued in commemoration of William J. Roué that shows his portrait and the famous Bluenose schooner he designed. The stamp was designed by Louis Hébert of Montreal. The Maritime Museum of the Atlantic in Halifax has an exhibit on Roué with his original design instruments and drawing board as well as a Roué-designed sloop Vagabond and schooner Hebridee II.

The W.J. Roué reading room was created in the Lunenburg, Nova Scotia library in 2002.

== Craft designs ==
- Design No. 1 - Babette
- Design No. 17 - Bluenose (1921)
- Design No. 20 - Roué 20 (1922)
- Design N0. 161 - Roué's Bluenose Sloop design (1946)

== Selected books ==
- Getson, Heather-Anne, Bluenose: The Ocean Knows Her Name., Halifax: Nimbus Publishing, 2006.
- Keith McLaren. A Race for Real Sailors: The Bluenose and the International Fishermen's Race 1920 - 1938. Vancouver: Douglas & McIntyre, 2006.
- Marq de Villiers. Witch in the Wind:The True Story of the Legendary Bluenose. Toronto: Thomas Allen, 2007.
