= Hunter 31-2 =

American sailboat

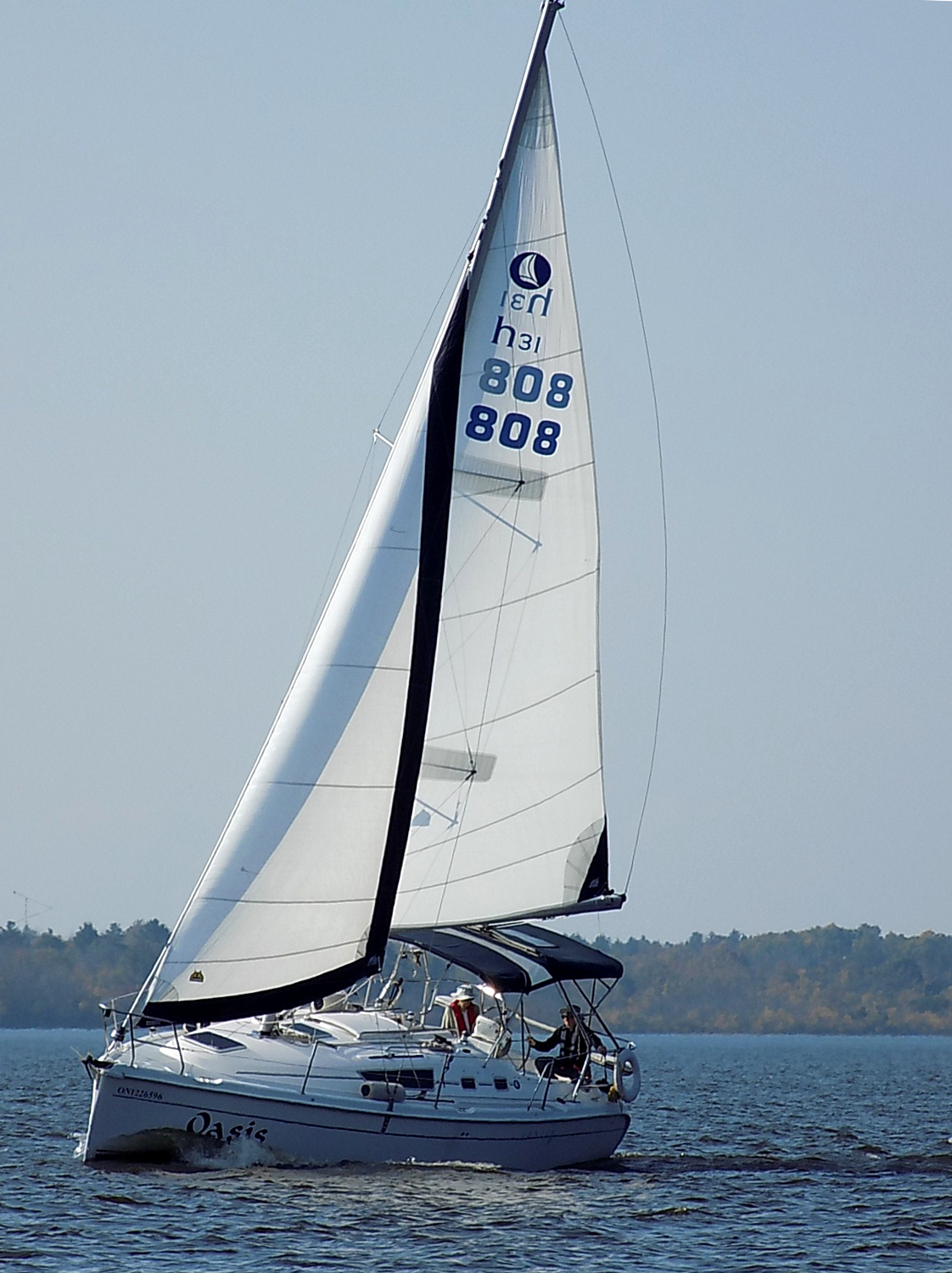
- Hunter 31-2

Development
- Designer: Hunter Design Team
- Location: United States
- Year: 2006
- Builder: Hunter Marine
- Name: Hunter 31-2

Boat
- Displacement: 8,505 lb (3,858 kg)
- Draft: 3.92 ft (1.19 m) with standard keel

Hull
- Type: Monohull
- Construction: Fiberglass
- LOA: 30.00 ft (9.14 m)
- LWL: 28.08 ft (8.56 m)
- Beam: 11.08 ft (3.38 m)
- Engine: Inboard engine

Hull appendages
- Keel: fin keel
- Ballast: 2,571 lb (1,166 kg)
- Rudder: internally-mounted spade-type rudder

Rig
- General: Fractional B&R rigged sloop
- I foretriangle height: 32.58 ft (9.93 m)
- J foretriangle base: 9.75 ft (2.97 m)
- P mainsail luff: 30.50 ft (9.30 m)
- E mainsail foot: 12.58 ft (3.83 m)

Sails
- Mainsail area: 191.85 sq ft (17.823 m^{2})
- Jib/genoa area: 158.83 sq ft (14.756 m^{2})
- Total sail area: 350.67 sq ft (32.578 m^{2})

The Hunter 31-2 is a recreational keelboat built by Hunter Marine from 2006 to 2009.

It was originally marketed by the manufacturer as the Hunter 30 and later as the Hunter 31, but is now usually referred to as the 31-2 or the 30/31 (2005), to differentiate it from the unrelated 1983 Hunter 31 design. It is also sometimes confused with the 2015 Marlow-Hunter 31. The Hunter 31-2 was also sold as the Hunter 30, causing confusion with the 1973 designed Hunter 30. It is sometimes called the Hunter 30-3.

== Design ==
Designed by the Hunter Design Team, the fiberglass hull with a plumb stem, a walk-through reverse transom with a swimming platform, an internally-mounted spade-type rudder controlled by a wheel and a fixed fin keel with a weighed bulb. It displaces 8,505 lb (3,858 kg) and carries 2,571 lb (1,166 kg) of ballast.

The boat has a draft of 3.92 ft (1.19 m) with the standard keel installed and is fitted with an inboard engine.

It has a fractional sloop B&R rig.

Standard equipment supplied included a 110% furling genoa, a chart table, window curtains, a laminate cabin sole, private forward and aft cabins, a two-burner stove, icebox, plates, bowls and mugs, an air horn, anchor and four life jackets. Factory available options included an autopilot, bimini top, air conditioning, spinnaker, microwave oven, 13 in (33 cm) flat panel TV and DVD player, a stereo with CD player and a Marine VHF radio.
