= Hunter 31 =

1980s American recreational keelboat

Development
- Designer: Cortland Steck
- Location: United States
- Year: 1983
- Builder: Hunter Marine
- Name: Hunter 31

Boat
- Displacement: 9,700 lb (4,400 kg)
- Draft: 5.30 ft (1.62 m) with standard keel

Hull
- Type: Monohull
- Construction: Fiberglass
- LOA: 31.33 ft (9.55 m)
- LWL: 26.25 ft (8.00 m)
- Beam: 10.92 ft (3.33 m)
- Engine: Yanmar diesel engine 16 hp (12 kW)

Hull appendages
- Keel: fin keel
- Ballast: 4,000 lb (1,814 kg)
- Rudder: internally-mounted spade-type rudder

Rig
- General: Masthead sloop B&R rig
- I foretriangle height: 42.00 ft (12.80 m)
- J foretriangle base: 12.00 ft (3.66 m)
- P mainsail luff: 37.42 ft (11.41 m)
- E mainsail foot: 11.00 ft (3.35 m)

Sails
- Mainsail area: 205.81 sq ft (19.120 m^{2})
- Jib/genoa area: 252.00 sq ft (23.412 m^{2})
- Total sail area: 457.81 sq ft (42.532 m^{2})

Racing
- PHRF: 168 (average)

The Hunter 31 is a recreational keelboat built by Hunter Marine in the United States between 1983 and 1987.

In 2006 the company introduced a new boat under the same Hunter 31 name, but it is commonly referred to as the Hunter 31-2 or Hunter 30/31 to differentiate it from this design. It is sometimes confused with the 2015 Marlow-Hunter 31.

The fiberglass hull has a reverse transom. The full keel boat has a PHRF racing average handicap of 168 with a high of 174 and low of 162. The shoal keel version has a PHRF racing average handicap of 171 with a high of 180 and low of 162. Both models have hull speeds of 6.87 kn (12.72 km/h).
