= Tanzer 31 =

30-foot Canadian keelboat from the 1980s

Development
- Designer: George Cuthbertson
- Location: Canada
- Year: 1984
- Builder: Tanzer Industries
- Name: Tanzer 31

Boat
- Crew: Two
- Draft: 6.25 ft (1.91 m)

Hull
- Type: Masthead sloop
- Construction: Fibreglass
- LOA: 30.58 ft (9.32 m)
- LWL: 25.00 ft (7.62 m)
- Beam: 10.50 ft (3.20 m)

Hull appendages
- Keel: fixed fin keel

Sails
- Mainsail area: 222.00 sq ft (20.624 m^{2})
- Jib/genoa area: 246.00 sq ft (22.854 m^{2})
- Total sail area: 468.00 sq ft (43.479 m^{2})

Racing
- PHRF: 168 (average)

The Tanzer 31 is a recreational keelboat built by Tanzer Industries of Dorion, Quebec from 1984 to 1986. It has a masthead sloop rig.

== Design ==
Designed by George Cuthbertson of Cuthbertson & Cassian, the fibreglass hull has a spade-style rudder and a fixed fin keel.

It is powered by an inboard Yanmar Diesel engine of 15 hp (11 kW), with a 44 US gal (167 L) fuel tank. A 44 US gal (167 L) fresh water tank was also fitted.

The boat has a PHRF racing average handicap of 168 with a high of 182 and a low of 159. It has a hull speed of 6.7 kn (12.41 km/h).

== Variants ==
Tanzer 31
Standard model with a standard keel that gives a draft of 5.25 ft (1.60 m), which displaces 8,300 lb (3,765 kg) and carries 3,400 lb (1,542 kg) of ballast.
Tanzer 31 Shoal-Draft
Shoal-draft model with a shorter keel that gives a draft of 4.00 ft (1.22 m) and which displaces 8,700 lb (3,946 kg).
