= Hunter 25-2 =

Sailboat class

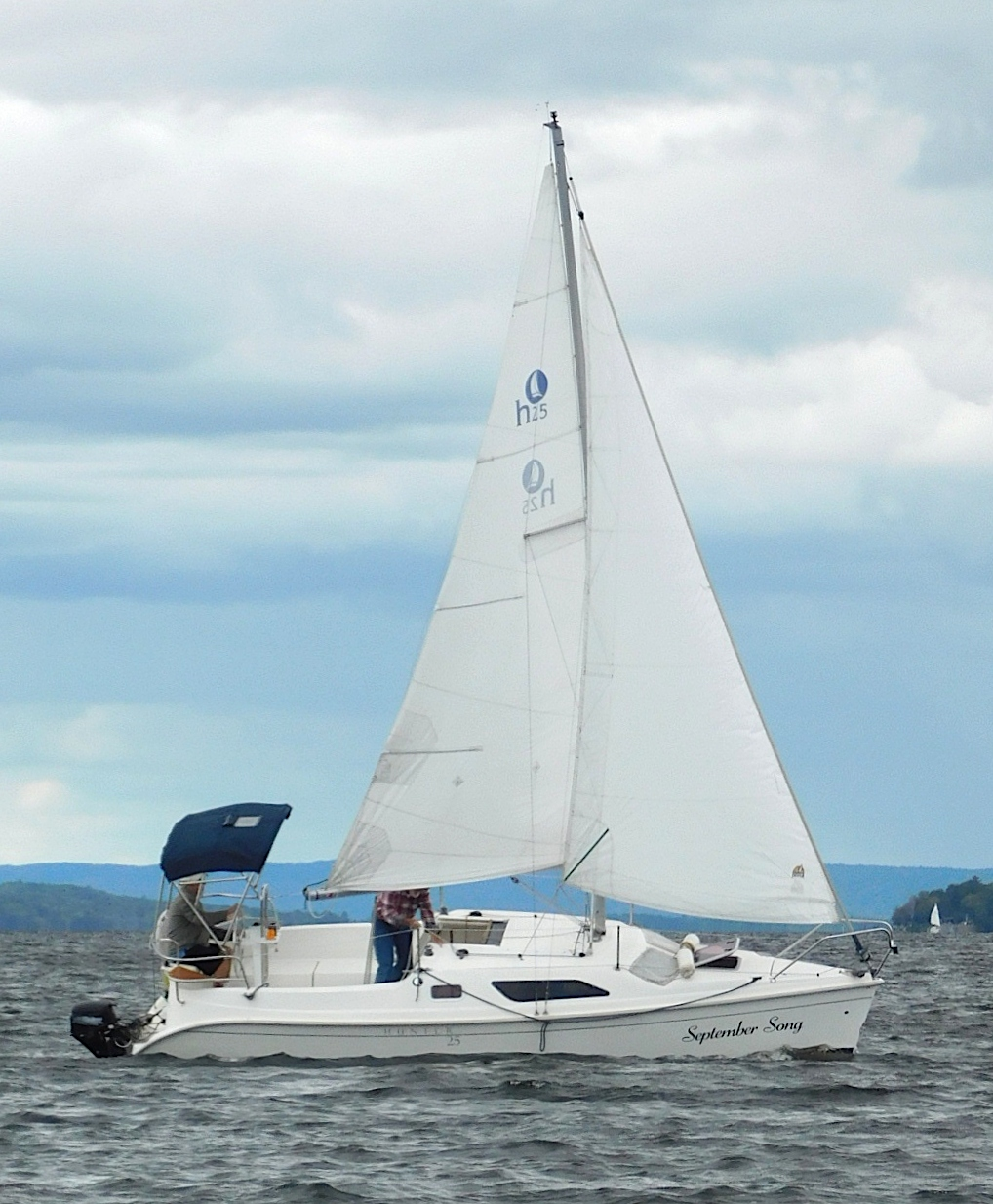

Development
- Designer: Glenn Henderson
- Location: United States
- Year: 2005
- Builder: Hunter Marine
- Role: Cruiser
- Name: Hunter 25-2

Boat
- Displacement: 3,700 lb (1,678 kg)
- Draft: 2.00 ft (0.61 m)

Hull
- Type: Monohull
- Construction: Fiberglass
- LOA: 24.50 ft (7.47 m)
- LWL: 22.08 ft (6.73 m)
- Beam: 8.46 ft (2.58 m)
- Engine: Outboard motor

Hull appendages
- Keel: shoal draft fin keel
- Ballast: 1,309 lb (594 kg)
- Rudder: transom-mounted rudder

Rig
- Rig type: B&R rig
- I foretriangle height: 25.00 ft (7.62 m)
- J foretriangle base: 8.50 ft (2.59 m)
- P mainsail luff: 23.42 ft (7.14 m)
- E mainsail foot: 9.50 ft (2.90 m)

Sails
- Sailplan: Masthead sloop
- Mainsail area: 111.25 sq ft (10.335 m^{2})
- Jib/genoa area: 106.25 sq ft (9.871 m^{2})
- Total sail area: 217.50 sq ft (20.206 m^{2})

The Hunter 25-2, sometimes referred to as the Hunter 25-2005 or the Hunter 25 Mark III, is an American trailerable sailboat that was designed by Glenn Henderson as a cruiser and first built in 2005.

The Hunter 25-2 replaced the Hunter 240 and 260 in the company product line.

The design was originally marketed by the manufacturer as the Hunter 25, but is now usually referred to as the Hunter 25-2, 25-2005 or Mark III, to differentiate it from the unrelated 1972 Hunter 25 design.

== Production ==
The design was built by Hunter Marine in the United States from 2005 until 2009, but production ended during the Great Recession.

== Design ==
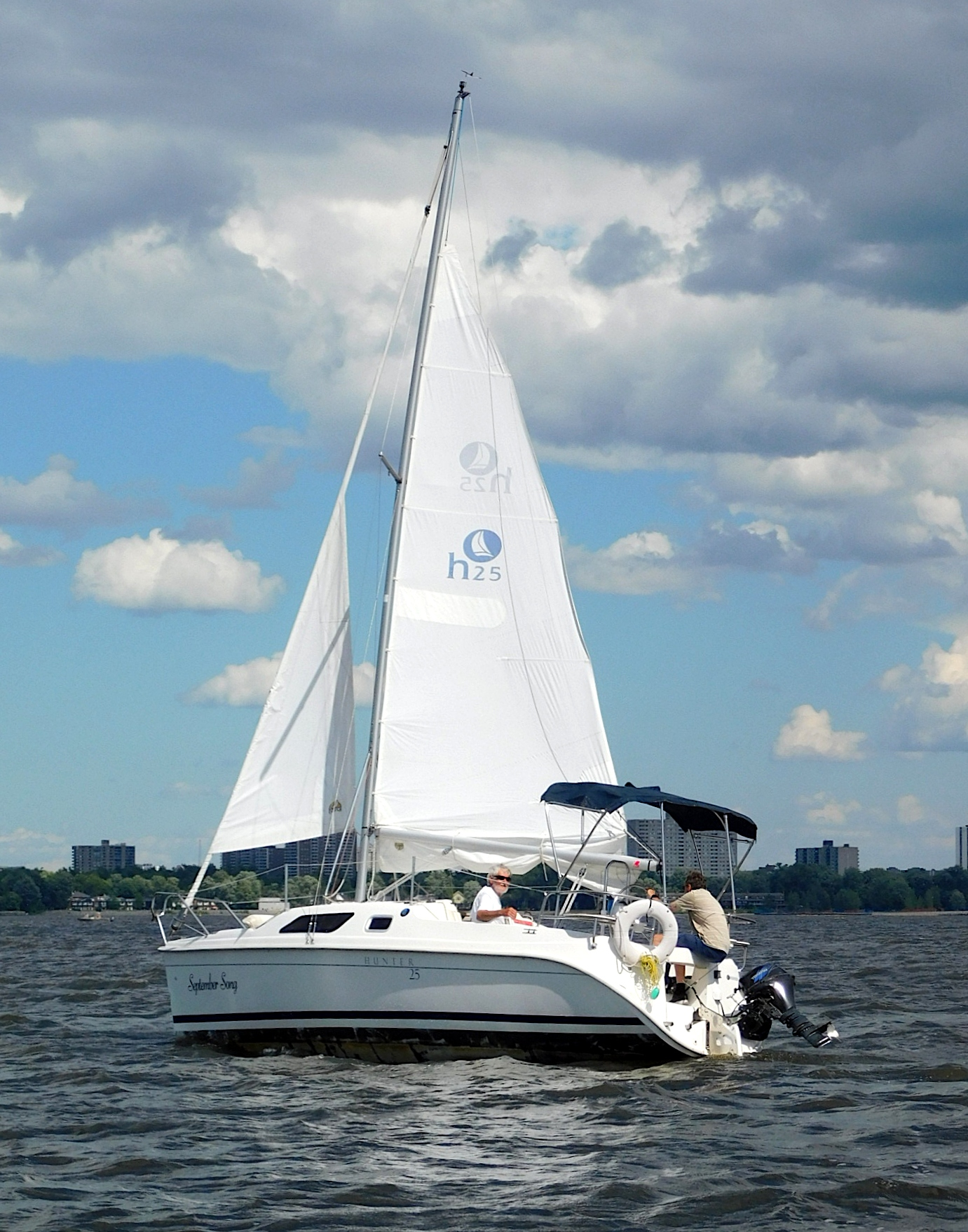
Hunter 25-2 showing rudder and walk-through transom

The Hunter 25-2 is a recreational keelboat, built predominantly of fiberglass, with wood trim. It has a B&R masthead sloop rig with aluminum spars, a raked stem, a walk-through, rounded reverse transom, a transom-hung rudder controlled by a wheel and a fixed fin shoal draft keel. It displaces 3,700 lb (1,678 kg) and carries 1,309 lb (594 kg) of lead ballast.

The boat has a draft of 2.00 ft (0.61 m) with the standard shoal draft keel, allowing ground transportation on a trailer.

The boat is normally fitted with a small outboard motor of up to 10.0 hp (7 kW) for docking and maneuvering.

The design has sleeping accommodation for four people, with a double "V"-berth in the bow cabin and an aft cabin with a double berth under the cockpit. The galley is located on the starboard side just forward of the companionway ladder. The head is located on the port side, beside the companionway steps. The main cabin has a drop-leaf table and two straight seats that each accommodate two people. The cabin has forward-facing rectangular ports. The fresh water tank has a capacity of 10 U.S. gallons (38 L; 8.3 imp gal). Cabin headroom is 64 in (163 cm).

The design has a PHRF racing average handicap of 225 and a hull speed of 6.3 kn (11.7 km/h).

== Operational history ==
In a 2010 review Steve Henkel wrote, "best features: the elevated seats on the stern quarters have proven to be very popular among boat buyers, giving an uninterrupted 'catbird's seat' view of the scene without interference from the cabinhouse or other cockpit occupants. A mast-raising system—similar to the Catalina 250—makes life at the launching ramp easier. Worst features: Like the Lancer 25, the extremely shallow fixed keel (2' 0" draft compared to the Lancer's 2' 4") is not adequate to prevent noticeable sideslip while sailing upwind."

== See also ==
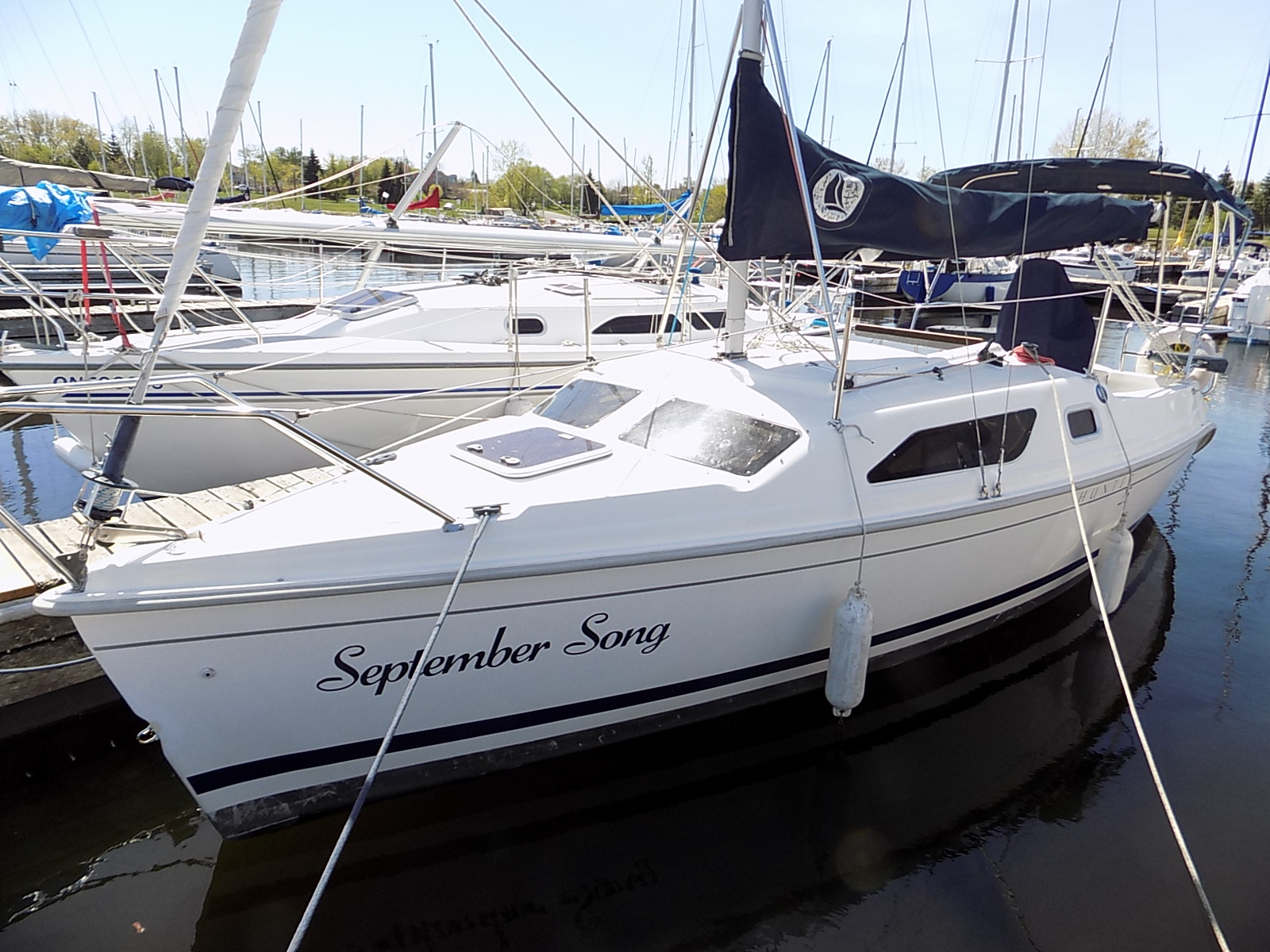
Hunter 25-2, showing forward cabin ports

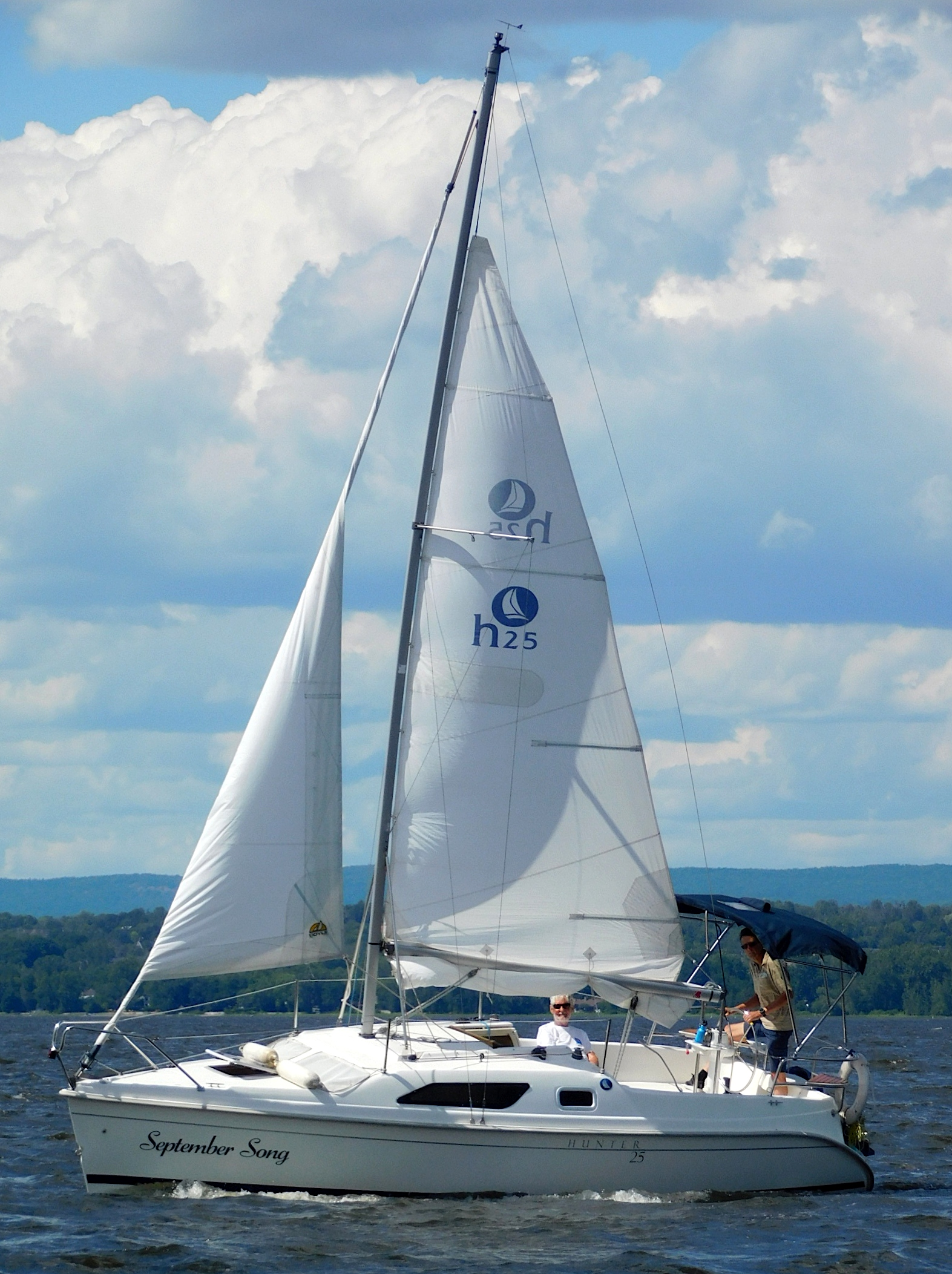
Hunter 25-2 with sails reefed in higher winds. The forward cabin ports are fitted with covers.

- List of sailing boat types

Related development

- Hunter 25
- Hunter 240
- Hunter 260
- Hunter 27 Edge

Similar sailboats

- Bayfield 25
- Beneteau First 25S
- C&C 25
- Capri 25
- Catalina 25
- Kirby 25
- MacGregor 25
- Mirage 25
- O'Day 25
- Redline 25
- Tanzer 25
- US Yachts US 25
