= Hunter 25 =

Sailboat class

Development
- Designer: John Cherubini and Bob Seidelmann
- Location: United States
- Year: 1972
- Builder: Hunter Marine
- Name: Hunter 25

Boat
- Displacement: 3,850 lb (1,746 kg)
- Draft: 3.92 ft (1.19 m)

Hull
- Type: Monohull
- Construction: Fiberglass
- LOA: 24.83 ft (7.57 m)
- LWL: 20.17 ft (6.15 m)
- Beam: 8.00 ft (2.44 m)
- Engine: Outboard motor

Hull appendages
- Keel: fin keel
- Ballast: 1,800 lb (816 kg)
- Rudder: internally-mounted spade-type rudder

Rig
- General: Masthead sloop
- I foretriangle height: 30.00 ft (9.14 m)
- J foretriangle base: 10.50 ft (3.20 m)
- P mainsail luff: 24.80 ft (7.56 m)
- E mainsail foot: 8.00 ft (2.44 m)

Sails
- Mainsail area: 99.20 sq ft (9.216 m^{2})
- Jib/genoa area: 157.50 sq ft (14.632 m^{2})
- Total sail area: 256.70 sq ft (23.848 m^{2})

Racing
- PHRF: 240 (average)

The Hunter 25 is an American trailerable sailboat, designed by John Cherubini and Bob Seidelmann and first built in 1972.

The original Hunter 25, sometimes called the Mark I, had a wedge-shaped cabin trunk, but a square, "box top" Mark II version was also produced.

A newly designed Hunter 25 was introduced in 2005 and is often referred to as the Hunter 25-2 to differentiate it from this design.

== Production ==
The boat was the first design constructed by Hunter Marine in the United States and was built between 1972 and 1983.

== Design ==
The Hunter 25 is a small recreational keelboat, built predominantly of fiberglass. It has a masthead sloop rig, an internally-mounted spade-type rudder and a fixed fin keel. It displaces 4,400 lb (1,996 kg) in the Mark I version and 3,850 lb (1,746 kg) as the Mark II. Both carry 1,800 lb (816 kg) of ballast.

The boat has a draft of 3.92 ft (1.19 m) with the standard keel and 2.92 ft (0.89 m) with the optional shoal draft keel.

The boat is normally fitted with a small 4 to 8 hp (3 to 6 kW) outboard motor for docking and maneuvering.

The design has sleeping accommodation for five people, with a double "V"-berth in the bow cabin, two straight settee berths in the main cabin and an aft single berth on the port side. The galley is located on the starboard side just forward of the companionway ladder. The galley is L-shaped and is equipped with a two-burner stove and a sink. The head is located just aft of the bow cabin on the starboard side. Cabin headroom is 62 in (157 cm) on the Mark I and 68 in (173 cm) on the Mark II.

The boat has a PHRF racing average handicap of 240. It has a hull speed of 6.02 kn (11.15 km/h).

== Operational history ==
In a 2010 review Steve Henkel wrote, "the Hunter 25 was the first sailboat design to be produced by Hunter. It was a success, and in 1977 was followed by the Hunter 25 Mark II, which retained the hull and layout below but sported a new and boxy deck with six inches more headroom. There were several pet names for the Mk I, with her low-domed cabintop and coaming going around the edge of the spray hood, including 'bubble top' and 'spitfire canopy.' After the Mk II came along, the names that stuck were 'wedge top' for the earlier design and 'box top' for the later, taller cabin."

== See also ==
- List of sailing boat types

Similar sailboats

- Bayfield 25
- Beneteau First 25S
- C&C 25
- Capri 25
- Catalina 25
- Kirby 25
- MacGregor 25
- Mirage 25
- O'Day 25
- Redline 25
- Tanzer 25
- US Yachts US 25
