= Hunter 19-2 =

Sailboat class

Development
- Designer: Hunter Design Team
- Location: United States
- Year: 1993
- Builder: Hunter Marine
- Name: Hunter 19-2

Boat
- Displacement: 2,000 lb (907 kg)
- Draft: 4.67 ft (1.42 m)

Hull
- Type: Monohull
- Construction: Fiberglass
- LOA: 19.00 ft (5.79 m)
- LWL: 15.92 ft (4.85 m)
- Beam: 7.75 ft (2.36 m)
- Engine: Outboard motor

Hull appendages
- Keel: centerboard
- Rudder: transom-mounted rudder

Rig
- Rig type: Bermuda rig
- I foretriangle height: 21.00 ft (6.40 m)
- J foretriangle base: 6.75 ft (2.06 m)
- P mainsail luff: 22.17 ft (6.76 m)
- E mainsail foot: 8.67 ft (2.64 m)

Sails
- Sailplan: Fractional rigged sloop
- Mainsail area: 96.11 sq ft (8.929 m^{2})
- Jib/genoa area: 70.88 sq ft (6.585 m^{2})
- Total sail area: 166.982 sq ft (15.5131 m^{2})

Racing
- PHRF: 282

The Hunter 19-2 is an American trailerable sailboat that was designed as a day sailer and small cruising sailboat by the Hunter Design Team and first built in 1993.

The design was originally marketed by the manufacturer as the Hunter 19, but is now usually referred to as the Hunter 19-2 to differentiate it from the unrelated 1981 Hunter 19-1 design, which was also sold as the Hunter 19.

== Production ==
The design was built by Hunter Marine in the United States between 1993 and 1996, but it is now out of production.

== Design ==
The Hunter 19-2 is a recreational keelboat, built predominantly of fiberglass, with positive flotation. It has a fractional sloop rig, a slightly raked stem, a walk-through reverse transom, a transom-hung kick-up rudder controlled by a tiller, a retractable centerboard and a flooding water ballast tank, which is drained for road transport. It displaces 2,000 lb (907 kg) when the 500 lb (227 kg)-capacity water ballast tank is full and 1,500 lb (680 kg) with it empty.

The boat has a draft of 4.67 ft (1.42 m) with the centreboard extended and 1.17 ft (0.36 m) with it retracted, allowing beaching or ground transportation on a trailer.

The boat is normally fitted with a small 3 to 6 hp (2 to 4 kW) outboard motor for docking and maneuvering. The design features a self-bailing cockpit, built-in outboard engine mount, a portable toilet, portable stove and a cooler. The fresh water tank has a capacity of 2.3 U.S. gallons (8.7 L; 1.9 imp gal). A highway trailer was supplied as standard equipment.

The design has sleeping accommodation for two people, with a double berth in an aft cabin. The galley is located on the port side just forward of the companionway ladder. The galley is equipped with a stove and a sink. The head is located in the forepeak. Cabin headroom is 52 in (132 cm).

The design has a PHRF racing average handicap of 282 and a hull speed of 5.35 kn (9.91 km/h).

== Operational history ==
In a 2010 review Steve Henkel wrote, "here is a boat that focuses on the relatively inexperienced sailor who seeks a vessel with certain characteristics: room down below; a modern streamlined look: easy trailerability; good affordability; and inclusion of all equipment and instrumentation required to go sailing so there's no need for endless trips to a marine store. Best features: Hunter hit their target market dead center. The boat is roomy ... has splashy hull decorations to lend a streamlined look; uses water ballast that can be drained before trailering, saving 600 pounds compared to comps: is priced for the budget-minded; and includes a 'Cruise Pac' with all gear needed, including a copy of Chapman's. Worst features: What the new sailor may not know is that he or she is getting a boat that is slow ... due to small sail area; tender (ie., tips easily) due to water ballast high up rather than lead or iron ballast down low ... and has a tendency to be blown sideways when the wind is abeam, limiting maneuverability under power, due to unusually high freeboard. The pity is that many of these owners think all sailboats have the faults they encounter, and just learn to live with them or quit sailing altogether."

== See also ==
- List of sailing boat types

Related development

- Hunter 19-1

Similar sailboats

- Hunter 23.5
- Hunter 240
- Hunter 260
- Hunter 27 Edge
- MacGregor 26
