= Hunter 23.5 =

Sailboat class

Development
- Designer: Hunter Design Team
- Location: United States
- Year: 1992
- Builder: Hunter Marine
- Name: Hunter 23.5

Boat
- Displacement: 2,000 lb (907 kg)
- Draft: 5.50 ft (1.68 m) with centerboard down

Hull
- Type: Monohull
- Construction: Fiberglass
- LOA: 23.67 ft (7.21 m)
- LWL: 21.42 ft (6.53 m)
- Beam: 8.33 ft (2.54 m)
- Engine: Outboard motor

Hull appendages
- Keel: centerboard
- Ballast: 1,000 lb (454 kg) of water
- Rudder: transom-mounted rudder

Rig
- Rig type: Bermuda rig
- I foretriangle height: 225.50 ft (68.73 m)
- J foretriangle base: 8.50 ft (2.59 m)
- P mainsail luff: 25.67 ft (7.82 m)
- E mainsail foot: 10.00 ft (3.05 m)

Sails
- Sailplan: Fractional rigged sloop
- Mainsail area: 128.35 sq ft (11.924 m^{2})
- Jib/genoa area: 108.38 sq ft (10.069 m^{2})
- Total sail area: 236.73 sq ft (21.993 m^{2})

Racing
- PHRF: 243 (average)

The Hunter 23.5 is an American trailerable sailboat that was designed by the Hunter Design Team and first built in 1992.

== Production ==
The design was built by Hunter Marine in the United States between 1992 and 1997, but it is now out of production.

== Design ==
The Hunter 23.5 is a recreational keelboat, built predominantly of fiberglass, with wood trim. It has a fractional sloop rig with a full batten mainsail and a 110% genoa, a raked stem, a walk-through reverse transom, a transom-hung rudder controlled by a metal tiller and a centerboard. It displaces 2,000 lb (907 kg) and carries 1,000 lb (454 kg) of flooding water ballast. The ballast is drained for road transport.

The boat has a draft of 5.50 ft (1.68 m) with the centreboard extended and 1.50 ft (0.46 m) with it retracted, allowing beaching or ground transportation on a trailer.

The boat is normally fitted with a small 3 to 6 hp (2 to 4 kW) outboard motor for docking and maneuvering. The fresh water tank has a capacity of 5 U.S. gallons (19 L; 4.2 imp gal).

Factory standard equipment supplied included a stove, sink, cooler, portable head, a dinette table that can be fitted in the lower deck and the cockpit, outboard motor mount, life jackets, an anchor and a fog bell. Optional equipment included a galvanized highway trailer, a 5 or 8 hp (4 or 6 kW) outboard motor and a canvas companionway cover.

The design has sleeping accommodation for six people, with a double "V"-berth in the bow cabin, two straight settee berths in the main cabin and an aft cabin with a double berth on the starboard side. The galley is located on the port side abeam the companionway ladder. The galley is L-shaped and is equipped with a single-burner stove and a sink. Cabin headroom is 54 in (137 cm).

The design has a PHRF racing average handicap of 243 with a high of 249 and low of 231. It has a hull speed of 6.2 kn (11.48 km/h).

== Operational history ==
In a 2010 review Steve Henkel wrote, "the Hunter ... uses water ballast, which automatically pours in as the boat is launched and drains out when the boat is pulled from the water and placed on its trailer. The water is supposed to lighten the hull for easier trailering (which it does), while preserving the boat's stiffness under sail which it doesn't, at least not very well). The water ballast just isn't heavy enough. Best features: There's lots of space compared to comp[etitor]s. Worst features: One disillusioned owner said it all: 'I love Hunter sailboats, but this model heels so rapidly [a result of the water ballast design] that it scared my wife right out of sailing, so I'm out of this sport altogether now.' The same owner pointed out that the handrails were 'weak and easily broken.' One may wonder, after his bad experience with the 23.5, why he 'loves' Hunters. He didn't tell us."

== See also ==
- List of sailing boat types

Similar sailboats

- Hunter 19-2
- Hunter 240
- Hunter 260
- Hunter 27 Edge
- MacGregor 26
