= Hunter 240 =

Sailboat class

Development
- Designer: Hunter Design Team
- Location: United States
- Year: 1998
- Builder: Hunter Marine
- Name: Hunter 240

Boat
- Displacement: 3,600 lb (1,633 kg)
- Draft: 5.50 ft (1.68 m) with centerboard down

Hull
- Type: Monohull
- Construction: Fiberglass
- LOA: 24.08 ft (7.34 m)
- LWL: 22.08 ft (6.73 m)
- Beam: 8.25 ft (2.51 m)
- Engine: Outboard motor

Hull appendages
- Keel: centerboard
- Ballast: 1,300 lb (590 kg) of water
- Rudder: transom-mounted rudder

Rig
- Rig type: Bermuda rig
- I foretriangle height: 25.50 ft (7.77 m)
- J foretriangle base: 8.50 ft (2.59 m)
- P mainsail luff: 24.25 ft (7.39 m)
- E mainsail foot: 10.50 ft (3.20 m)

Sails
- Sailplan: Fractional B&R rigged sloop
- Mainsail area: 127.31 sq ft (11.827 m^{2})
- Jib/genoa area: 108.38 sq ft (10.069 m^{2})
- Total sail area: 235.69 sq ft (21.896 m^{2})

Racing
- PHRF: 255 (average)

The Hunter 240 is an American trailerable sailboat that was designed by the Hunter Design Team and first built in 1998.

== Production ==
The design was built by Hunter Marine in the United States from 1998 to 2005, but it is now out of production.

== Design ==
The Hunter 240 is a recreational keelboat, built predominantly of fiberglass. It has a fractional sloop B&R rig, a raked stem, a walk-through reverse transom, a transom-hung rudder controlled by a tiller and a retractable centerboard. It displaces 3,600 lb (1,633 kg) and carries 1,300 lb (590 kg) of flooding water ballast. The ballast is drained for road transport.

The boat has a draft of 5.50 ft (1.68 m) with the centreboard extended and 1.50 ft (0.46 m) with it retracted, allowing beaching or ground transportation on a trailer.

The boat is normally fitted with a small 3 to 6 hp (2 to 4 kW) outboard motor for docking and maneuvering. The factory optional equipment included a 4 hp (3 kW), 8 hp (6 kW) or 9.9 hp (7 kW) outboard.

Factory standard equipment included a 110% genoa, outboard motor bracket, dinette table, potable head, highway trailer, anchor and life jackets. Factory optional equipment included a Bimini top, camper tent enclosure, spinnaker, and a roller furling jib.

The design has sleeping accommodation for four people, with a double "V"-berth in the bow cabin nd an aft cabin with a transversely-mounted double berth. The galley is located on the port side just forward of the companionway ladder. The galley is equipped with a single-burner stove and a sink. The head is located in the bow cabin on the starboard, under the "V"-berth. Cabin headroom is 56 in (142 cm).

The design has a PHRF racing average handicap of 255 with a high of 255 and low of 258. It has a hull speed of 6.3 kn (11.67 km/h).

== Operational history ==
In a 2010 review Steve Henkel wrote, "Best features: As with other Hunter trailer-sailers, the 240 has an innovative mast-raising system which makes rigging relatively fast and easy, and a custom trailer that fits the boat and eliminates some of the hassle of launching at a ramp. A movable table ... can be set up in the cockpit or the cabin. Worst features: Water ballast has never worked very well for any of the under 26-foot boats on which it has been tried, and the Hunter is no exception."

== See also ==
- List of sailing boat types

Similar sailboats

- Hunter 19-2
- Hunter 23.5
- Hunter 260
- Hunter 27 Edge
- MacGregor 26
