= Beneteau First 260 Spirit =

Sailboat class

Development
- Designer: Group Finot
- Location: France
- Year: 1994
- No. built: 500
- Builder: Beneteau
- Name: Beneteau First 260 Spirit

Boat
- Displacement: 4,740 lb (2,150 kg)
- Draft: 6.07 ft (1.85 m) centreboard down

Hull
- Type: Monohull
- Construction: Fiberglass
- LOA: 24.57 ft (7.49 m)
- LWL: 24.11 ft (7.35 m)
- Beam: 9.06 ft (2.76 m)
- Engine: Nanni Industries diesel engine

Hull appendages
- Keel: centreboard
- Ballast: 1,433 lb (650 kg)
- Rudder: transom-mounted dual rudders

Rig
- Rig type: Bermuda rig
- I foretriangle height: 33.80 ft (10.30 m)
- J foretriangle base: 9.71 ft (2.96 m)
- P mainsail luff: 32.15 ft (9.80 m)
- E mainsail foot: 11.48 ft (3.50 m)

Sails
- Sailplan: Fractional rigged sloop
- Mainsail area: 184.54 sq ft (17.144 m^{2})
- Jib/genoa area: 164.10 sq ft (15.245 m^{2})
- Total sail area: 348.64 sq ft (32.390 m^{2})

The Beneteau First 260 Spirit is a French sailboat designed by Group Finot, first built in 1994.

The First 260 Spirit was developed into the Beneteau First 25.7 in 2004, which became the Beneteau First 25S in 2008.

== Production ==
The design was built by Beneteau in France, but is now out of production. During its production run 500 boats were completed.

== Design ==
The First 260 Spirit is a recreational keelboat, built predominantly of fiberglass, with wood trim. It has a fractional sloop rig, a plumb stem, a reverse transom, dual transom-hung rudders controlled by a tiller and a centreboard. It displaces 4,740 lb (2,150 kg) and carries 1,433 lb (650 kg) of ballast.

The boat has a draft of 6.07 ft (1.85 m) with the centreboard extended and 2.79 ft (0.85 m) with it retracted.

The boat is fitted with a Nanni Industries diesel engine. The fuel tank holds 8 U.S. gallons (30 L; 6.7 imp gal) and the fresh water tank has a capacity of 9 U.S. gallons (34 L; 7.5 imp gal).

The design has a hull speed of 6.58 kn (12.19 km/h).

== Operational history ==
The designer of the boat, Jean-Marie Finot, owned and sailed a First 260 Spirit for a number of years.

== See also ==
- List of sailing boat types

Related development

- Beneteau First 25S
- Beneteau First 25.7
