= Beneteau First 25.7 =

Sailboat class

Development
- Designer: Group Finot
- Location: France
- Year: 2004
- Builder: Beneteau
- Name: Beneteau First 25.7

Boat
- Displacement: 4,740 lb (2,150 kg)
- Draft: 6.07 ft (1.85 m) centreboard down

Hull
- Type: Monohull
- Construction: Fiberglass
- LOA: 24.57 ft (7.49 m)
- LWL: 24.11 ft (7.35 m)
- Beam: 9.06 ft (2.76 m)
- Engine: Nanni Industries 14 hp (10 kW) diesel engine

Hull appendages
- Keel: centreboard or fin keel
- Ballast: 1,433 lb (650 kg)
- Rudder: transom-mounted dual rudders

Rig
- Rig type: Bermuda rig
- I foretriangle height: 33.79 ft (10.30 m)
- J foretriangle base: 9.71 ft (2.96 m)
- P mainsail luff: 31.99 ft (9.75 m)
- E mainsail foot: 11.48 ft (3.50 m)

Sails
- Sailplan: Fractional rigged sloop
- Mainsail area: 183.62 sq ft (17.059 m^{2})
- Jib/genoa area: 164.05 sq ft (15.241 m^{2})
- Total sail area: 347.67 sq ft (32.300 m^{2})

The Beneteau First 25.7 is a French sailboat, that was designed by Group Finot and first built in 2004.

The First 25.7 is a development of the Beneteau First 260 Spirit and was developed into the Beneteau First 25S in 2008.

== Production ==
The design was built by Beneteau in France and in the United States, but is now out of production.

== Design ==
The First 25.7 is a recreational keelboat, built predominantly of fiberglass, with wood trim. It has a fractional sloop rig, a plumb stem, a vertical transom, dual transom-hung rudders controlled by a tiller and a centreboard or optional fixed fin keel. It displaces 4,740 lb (2,150 kg) and carries 1,433 lb (650 kg) of ballast.

The keel-equipped version of the boat has a draft of 4.76 ft (1.45 m), while the centreboard-equipped version has a draft of 6.07 ft (1.85 m) with the centreboard extended and 2.79 ft (0.85 m) with it retracted.

The boat is optionally fitted with a Nanni Industries diesel engine of 14 hp (10 kW). The fuel tank holds 8 U.S. gallons (30 L; 6.7 imp gal) and the fresh water tank has a capacity of 10 U.S. gallons (38 L; 8.3 imp gal).

The design has a hull speed of 6.58 kn (12.19 km/h).

== See also ==
- List of sailing boat types

Related development

- Beneteau First 25S
- Beneteau First 260 Spirit
