= Redline 25 =

Sailboat class

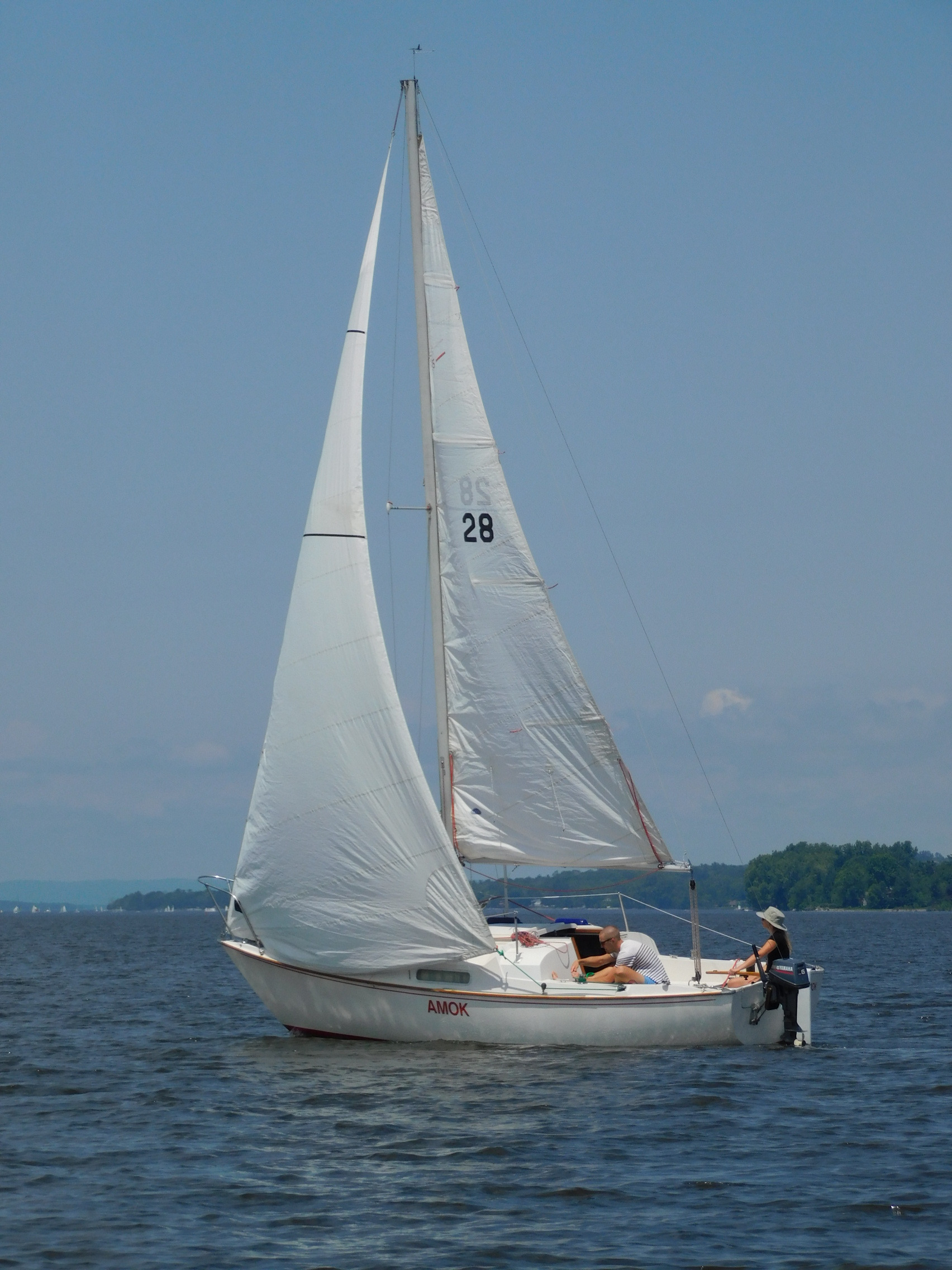

Development
- Designer: C&C Design
- Location: Canada
- Year: 1969
- Builders: Bruckman Manufacturing and C&C Yachts
- Name: Redline 25

Boat
- Displacement: 4,115 lb (1,867 kg)
- Draft: 5.00 ft (1.52 m) with centreboard extended

Hull
- Type: Monohull
- Construction: Fiberglass
- LOA: 24.58 ft (7.49 m)
- LWL: 20.50 ft (6.25 m)
- Beam: 8.00 ft (2.44 m)
- Engine: Outboard motor

Hull appendages
- Keel: fixed keel with retractable centreboard
- Ballast: 1,915 lb (869 kg)
- Rudder: transom-mounted rudder

Rig
- General: Masthead sloop
- I foretriangle height: 28.00 ft (8.53 m)
- J foretriangle base: 10.30 ft (3.14 m)
- P mainsail luff: 24.00 ft (7.32 m)
- E mainsail foot: 9.00 ft (2.74 m)

Sails
- Mainsail area: 108.00 sq ft (10.034 m^{2})
- Jib/genoa area: 144.20 sq ft (13.397 m^{2})
- Total sail area: 252.20 sq ft (23.430 m^{2})

Racing
- PHRF: 237 (average)

The Redline 25, sometimes called the C&C 25 Redline, is a Canadian sailboat, that was designed by C&C Design and first built in 1969.

C&C also built an unrelated design with a similar name, the C&C 25.

== Production ==
The boat was built by Bruckman Manufacturing in Canada starting in 1969. Bruckman became part of C&C Yachts that same year and C&C continued to produce the boat. The design is now out of production.

== Design ==
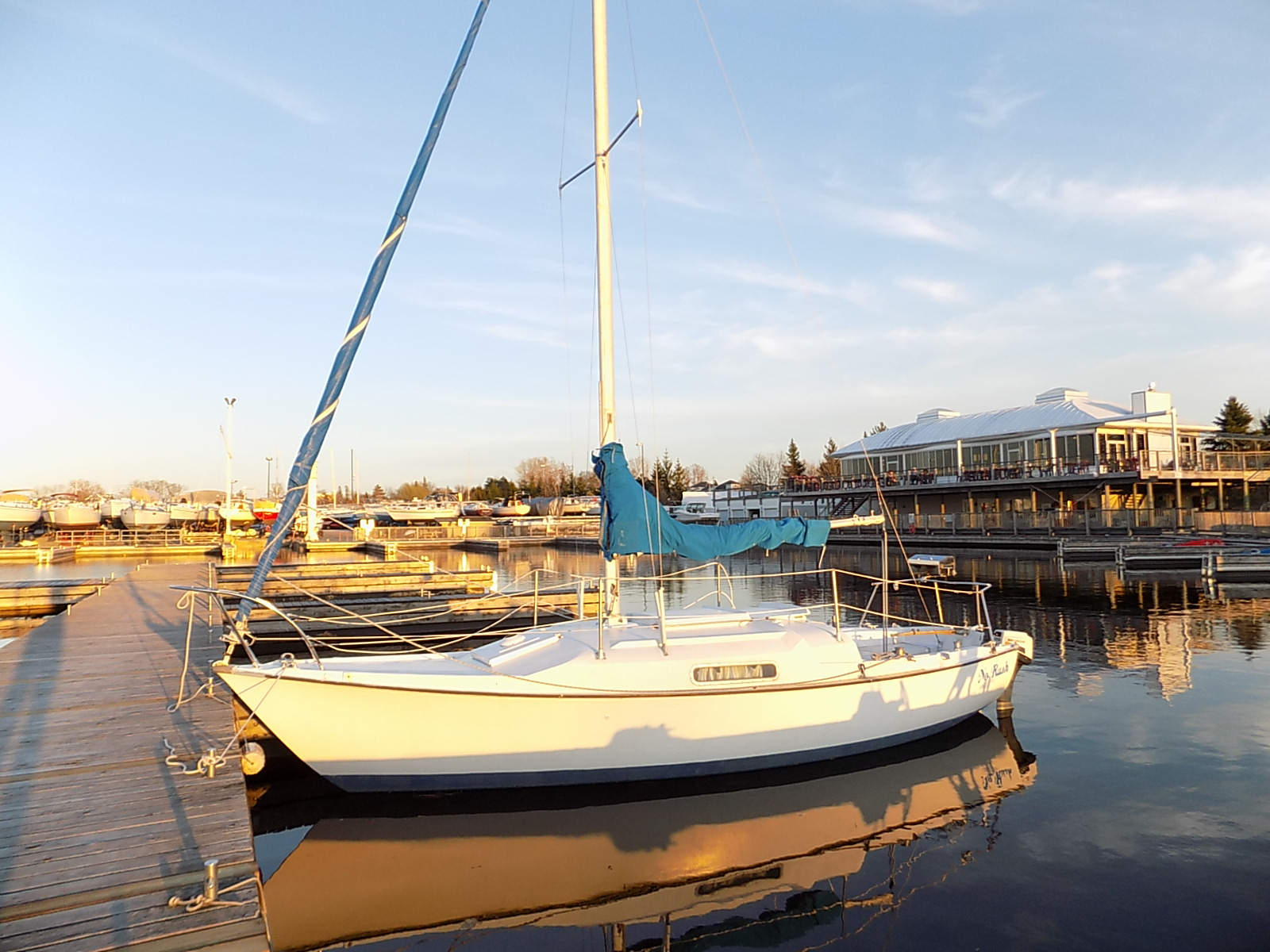
Redline 25

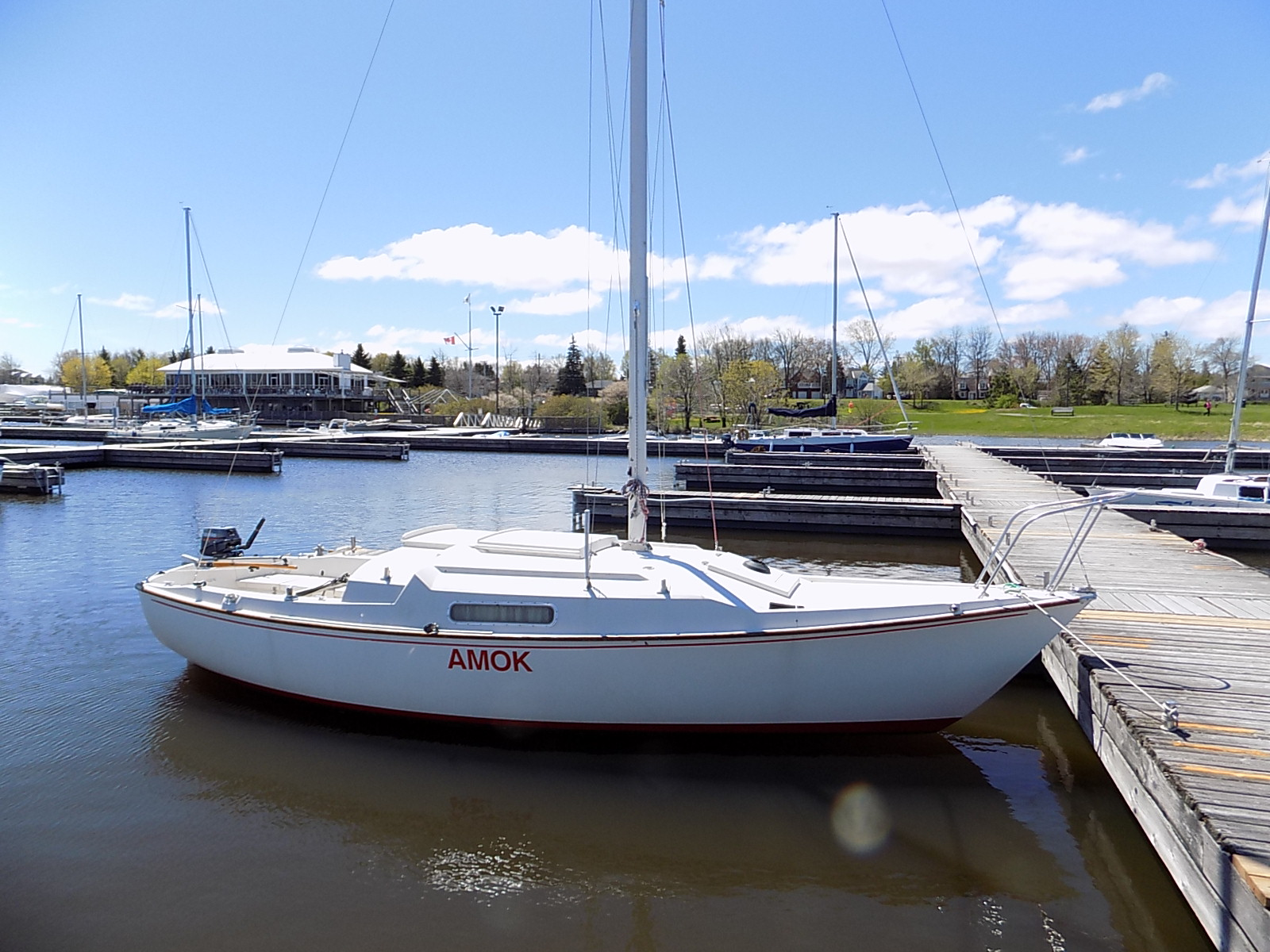
Redline 25

The Redline 25 is a small recreational keelboat, built predominantly of fiberglass, with wood trim. It has a masthead sloop rig, a transom-hung rudder and a small fixed fin keel, with a retractable centreboard. The boat has a draft of 5.00 ft (1.52 m) with the centreboard down and 2.50 ft (0.76 m) with the centreboard retracted. The boat displaces 4,115 lb (1,867 kg) and carries 1,915 lb (869 kg) of ballast.

The boat is normally fitted with an outboard motor.

The boat has a PHRF racing average handicap of 237 with a high of 237 and low of 240. It has a hull speed of 6.07 kn (11.24 km/h).

== See also ==
- List of sailing boat types
