= Beneteau First 25S =

Sailboat class

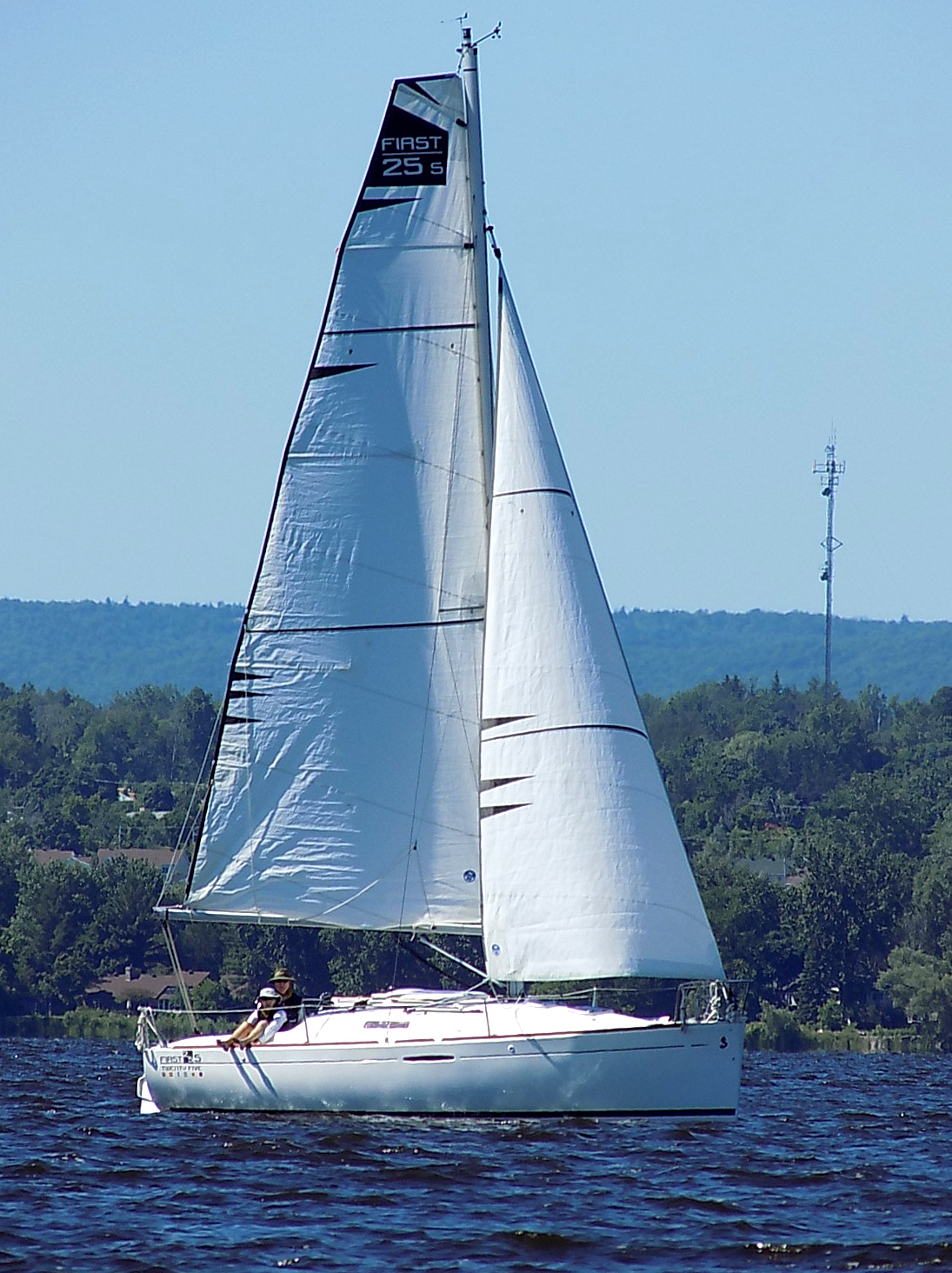

Development
- Designer: Group Finot - Conq
- Location: France
- Year: 2008
- Builder: Beneteau
- Name: Beneteau First 25S

Boat
- Displacement: 4,740 lb (2,150 kg)
- Draft: 6.08 ft (1.85 m) centreboard down

Hull
- Type: Monohull
- Construction: Fiberglass
- LOA: 24.58 ft (7.49 m)
- LWL: 24.11 ft (7.35 m)
- Beam: 9.00 ft (2.74 m)
- Engine: Optional Yanmar 2YM15 14 hp (10 kW) diesel engine

Hull appendages
- Keel: centreboard or fin keel
- Ballast: 1,433 lb (650 kg)
- Rudder: transom-mounted dual rudders

Rig
- Rig type: Bermuda rig
- I foretriangle height: 32.16 ft (9.80 m)
- J foretriangle base: 9.83 ft (3.00 m)
- P mainsail luff: 31.16 ft (9.50 m)
- E mainsail foot: 12.83 ft (3.91 m)

Sails
- Sailplan: Fractional rigged sloop
- Mainsail area: 199.89 sq ft (18.570 m^{2})
- Jib/genoa area: 158.07 sq ft (14.685 m^{2})
- Total sail area: 357.96 sq ft (33.256 m^{2})

The Beneteau First 25S is a French sailboat, that was designed by Group Finot/Conq and first built in 2008.

The First 25S is a development of the Beneteau First 260 Spirit and the Beneteau First 25.7.

== Production ==
The design is built by Beneteau in France and in the United States. It remained in production in 2018 as the First 25.

== Design ==
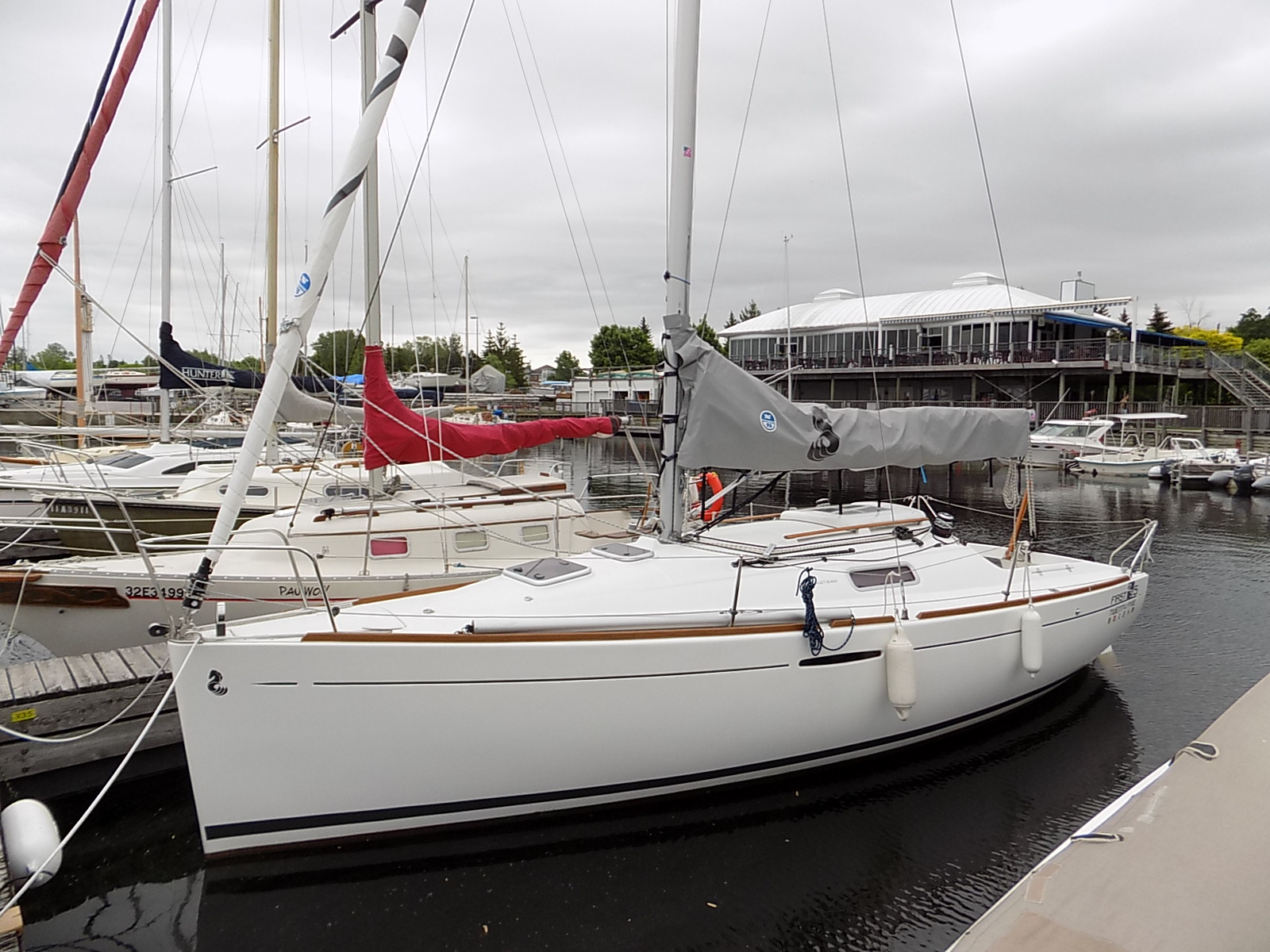
Beneteau First 25S

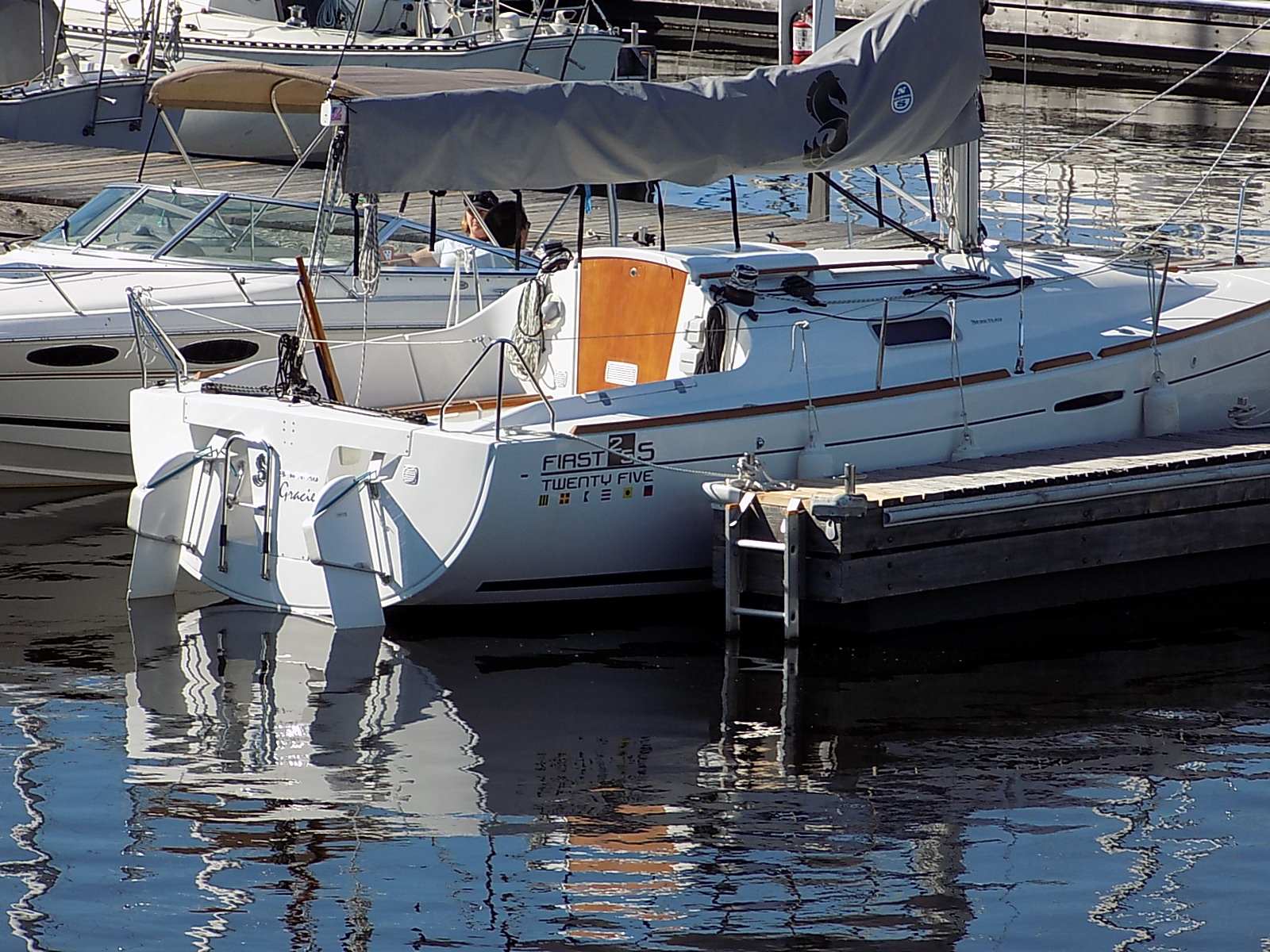
Beneteau First 25S showing the dual rudder arrangement

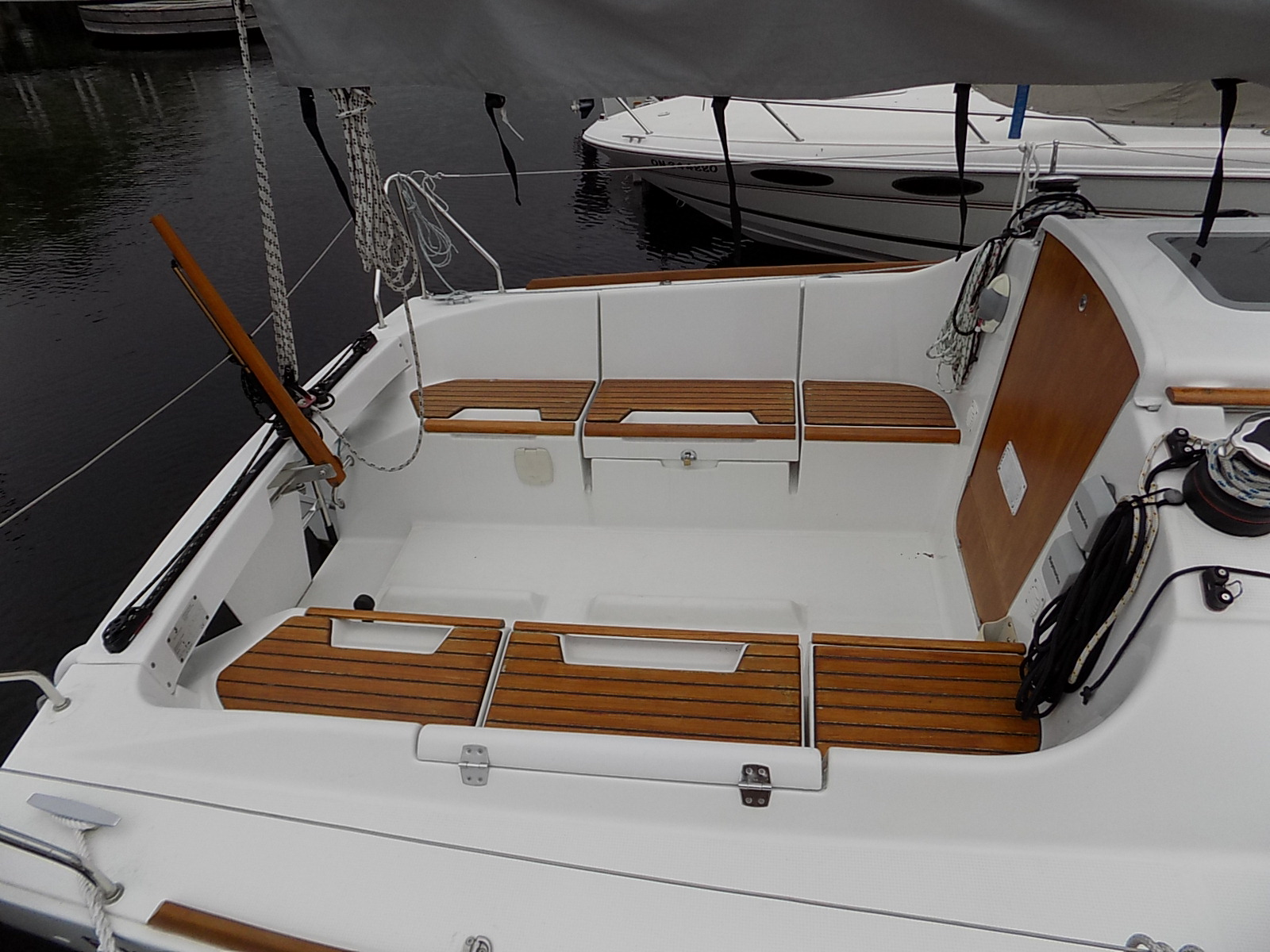
Beneteau First 25S cockpit

The First 25S is a recreational keelboat, built predominantly of fiberglass, with wood trim. It has a fractional sloop rig with a square-head mainsail, a plumb stem, a vertical transom, dual transom-hung rudders controlled by a tiller and a centreboard or optional fixed fin keel. It displaces 4,740 lb (2,150 kg) and carries 1,433 lb (650 kg) of ballast.

The keel-equipped version of the boat has a draft of 4.76 ft (1.45 m), while the centreboard-equipped version has a draft of 6.08 ft (1.85 m) with the centreboard extended and 2.75 ft (0.84 m) with it retracted.

The boat is optionally fitted with a Japanese Yanmar 2YM15 diesel engine of 14 hp (10 kW). The fuel tank holds 8 U.S. gallons (30 L; 6.7 imp gal) and the fresh water tank has a capacity of 11 U.S. gallons (42 L; 9.2 imp gal).

The design has a hull speed of 6.58 kn (12.19 km/h).

== Operational history ==
In a 2017 review in Sail magazine, writer Zuzana Prochazka concluded, "Beneteau’s marketing material describes the boat as being built for 'spontaneous day-cruising,' but it's clear there is enough performance in this design for the boat to get in some fun and exciting club racing as well. Equally appealing is the idea that you can trailer the First 25 S pretty much anywhere, launch it and go exploring to your heart's content. In short, this is one nice little boat."

== See also ==
- List of sailing boat types

Related development

- Beneteau First 25.7
- Beneteau First 260 Spirit
