= Tanzer 25 =

1986 Canadian fractional rigged keelboat

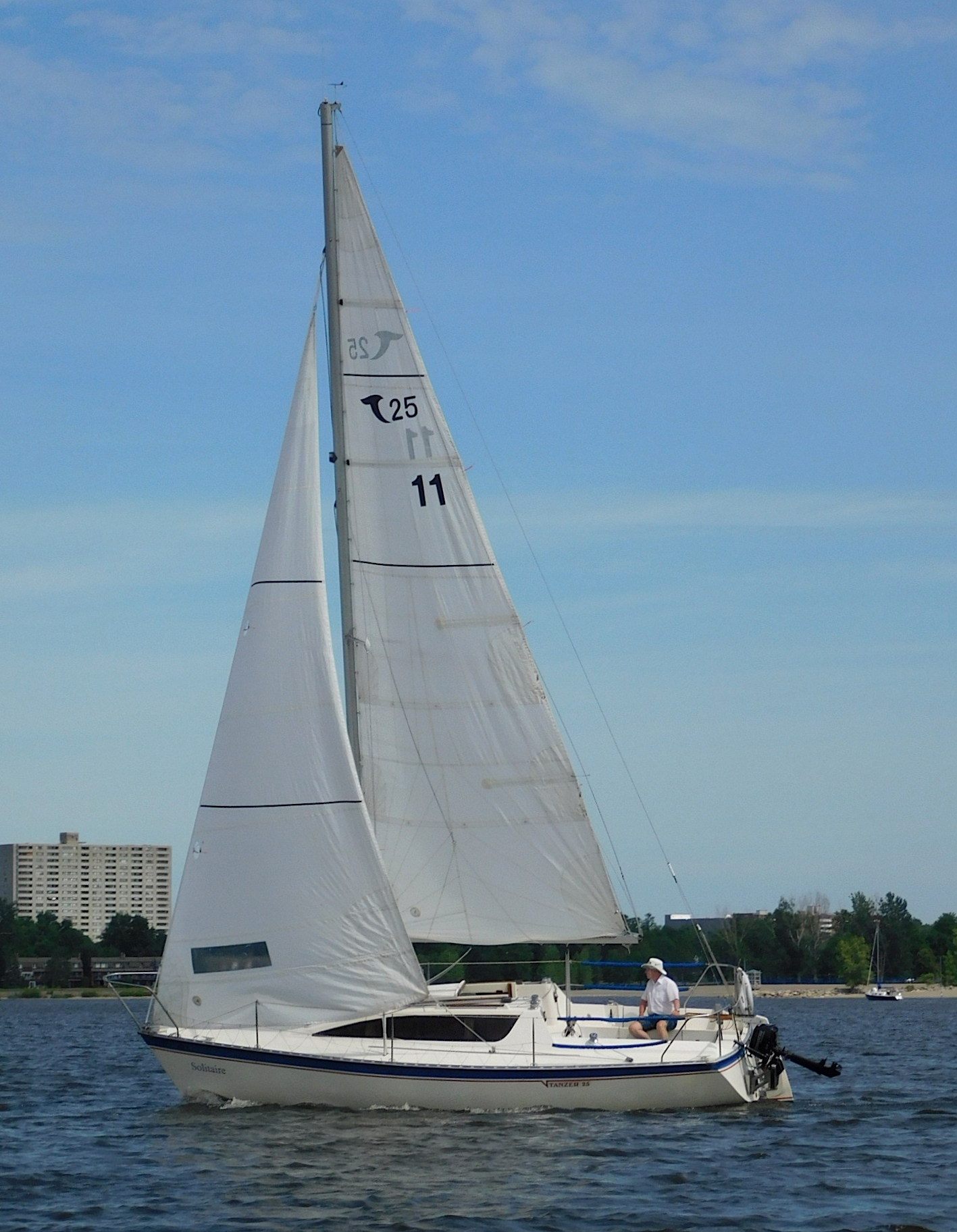

Development
- Designer: Joubert-Nivelt
- Location: Canada
- Year: 1986
- Builders: Tanzer Industries; Canadian Yacht Builders; Challenger Yachts; Mirage Yachts
- Name: Tanzer 25

Boat
- Draft: 4.70 ft (1.43 m) with standard keel

Hull
- Type: Fractional rigged sloop
- Construction: Fibreglass
- LOA: 25.25 ft (7.70 m)
- LWL: 21.83 ft (6.65 m)
- Beam: 9.58 ft (2.92 m)

Hull appendages
- Keel: fixed fin
- Ballast: 1,650 lb (750 kg)

Sails
- Mainsail area: 179.14 sq ft (16.643 m^{2})
- Jib/genoa area: 147.07 sq ft (13.663 m^{2})
- Total sail area: 326.20 sq ft (30.305 m^{2})

Racing
- PHRF: 180 (average)

The Tanzer 25 is a recreational keelboat built by Tanzer Industries of Dorion, Quebec. It was built in 1986, Tanzer's last year of operation. After Tanzer closed, the design passed to other builders, including Canadian Yacht Builders, Challenger Yachts and Mirage Yachts.

Designed by the French company of Joubert-Nivelt, the fibreglass hull has a transom-hung rudder. A shoal-draft keel with a draft of 2.82 ft (0.86 m), was a factory option. It has a hull speed of 6.26 kn (11.59 km/h).

Cabin headroom is 69 in (175 cm). It has four berths. The galley is on the port side just forward of the companionway ladder and it has a two-burner stove and a sink. The head is aft of the companionway on the starboard side, with a navigation station in front of it.

It has a fractional sloop rig.

== Gallery ==
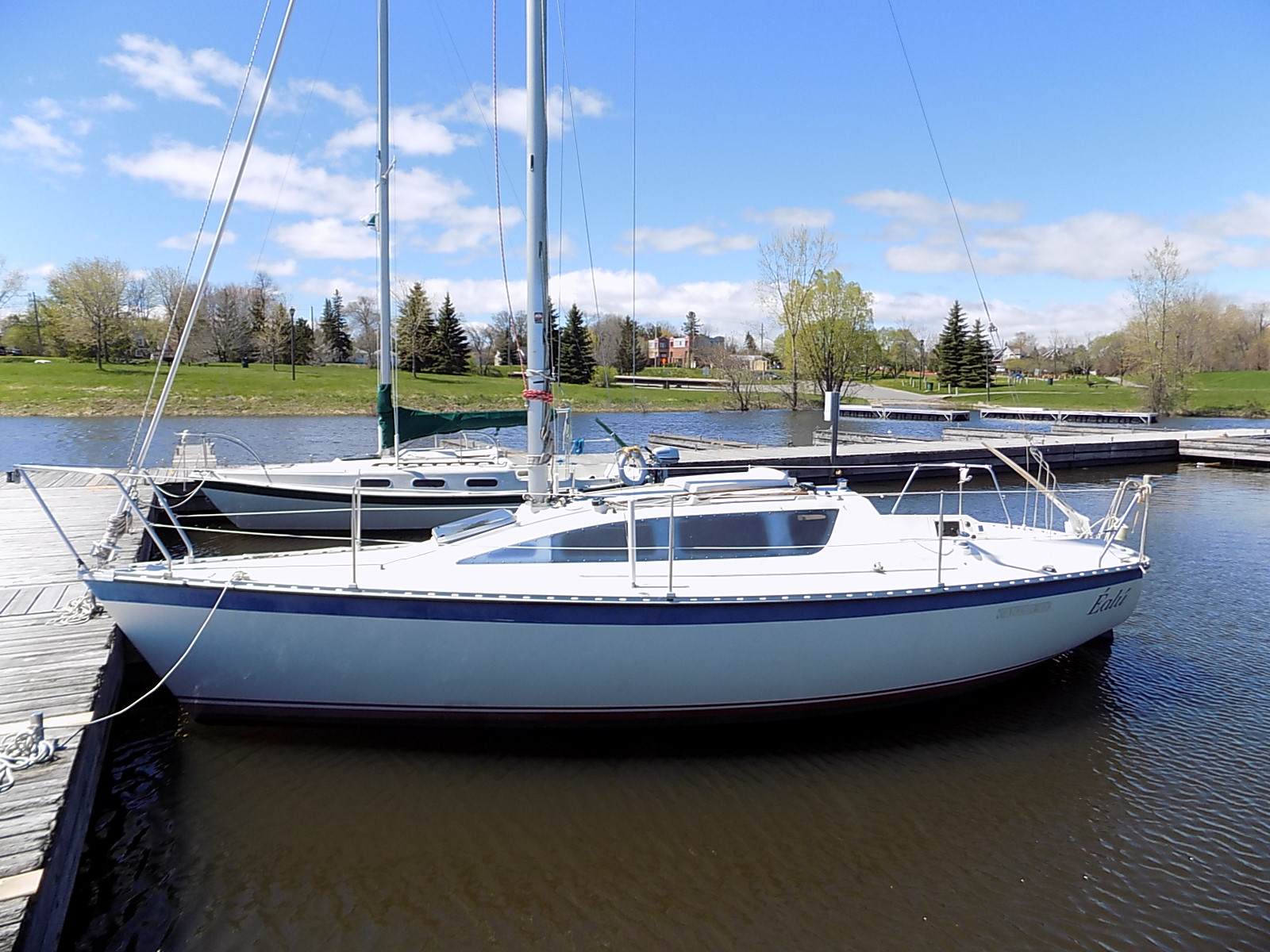

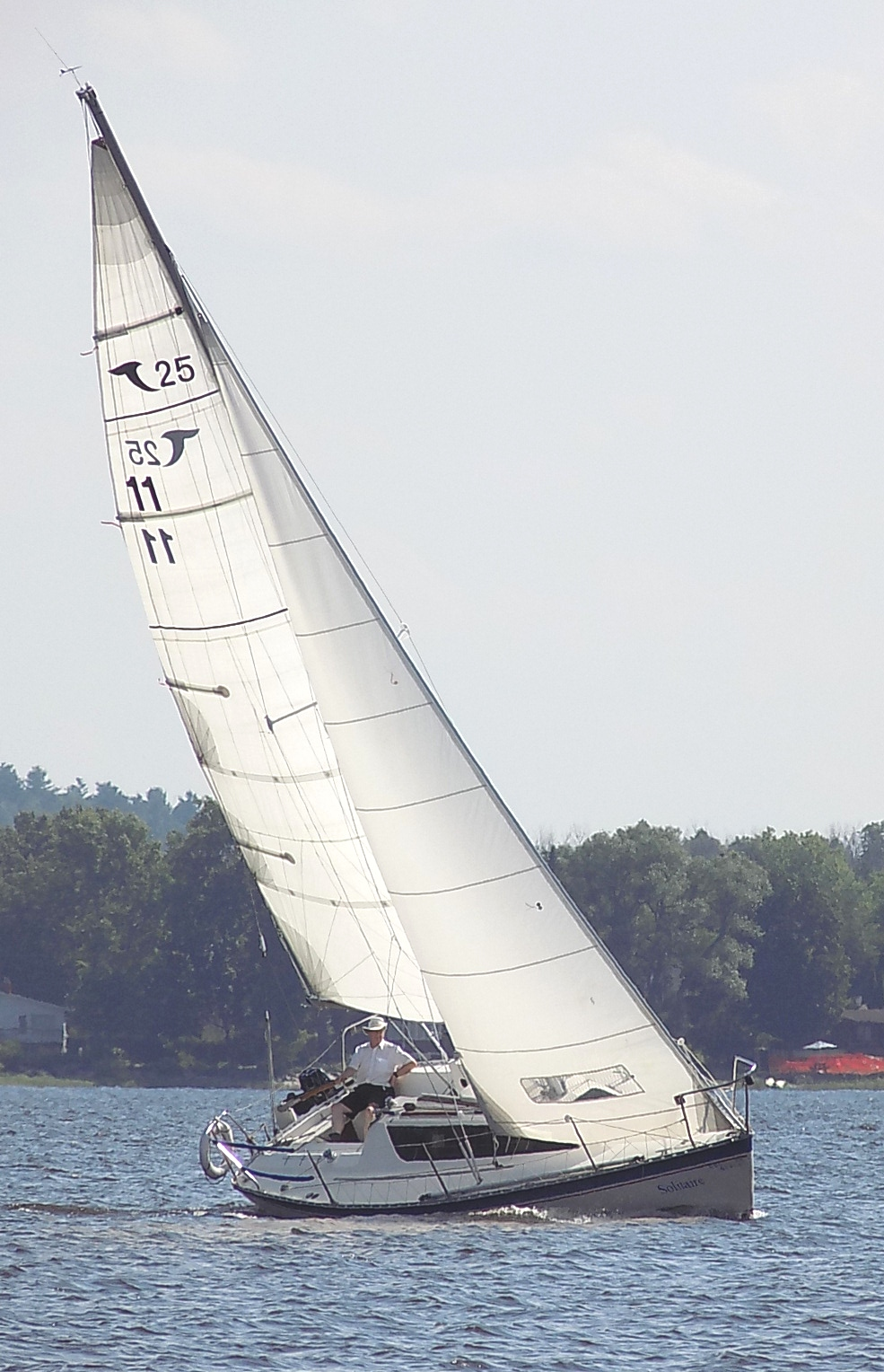

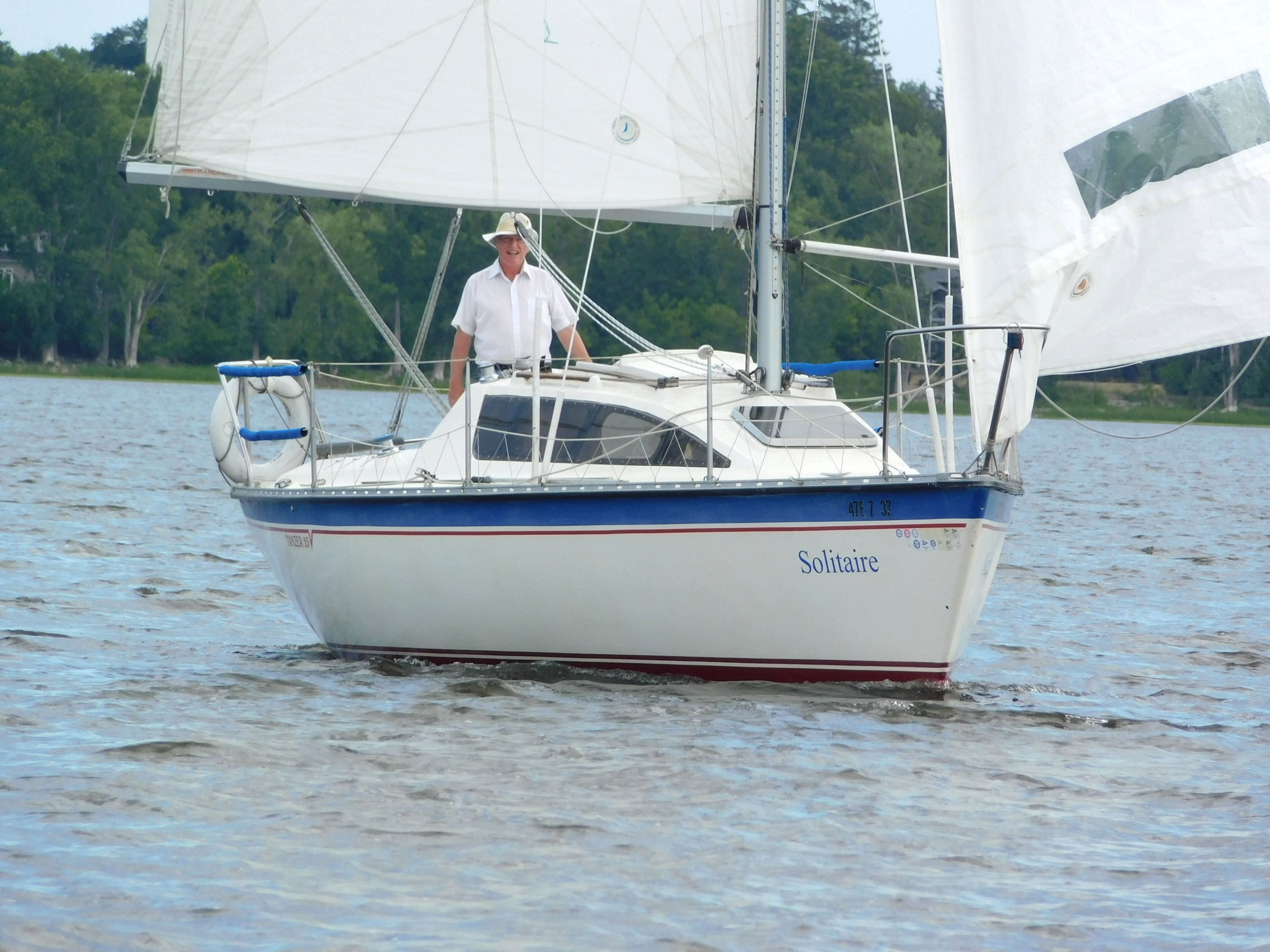
