= Hunter 260 =

U.S. trailer sailer first built in 1997

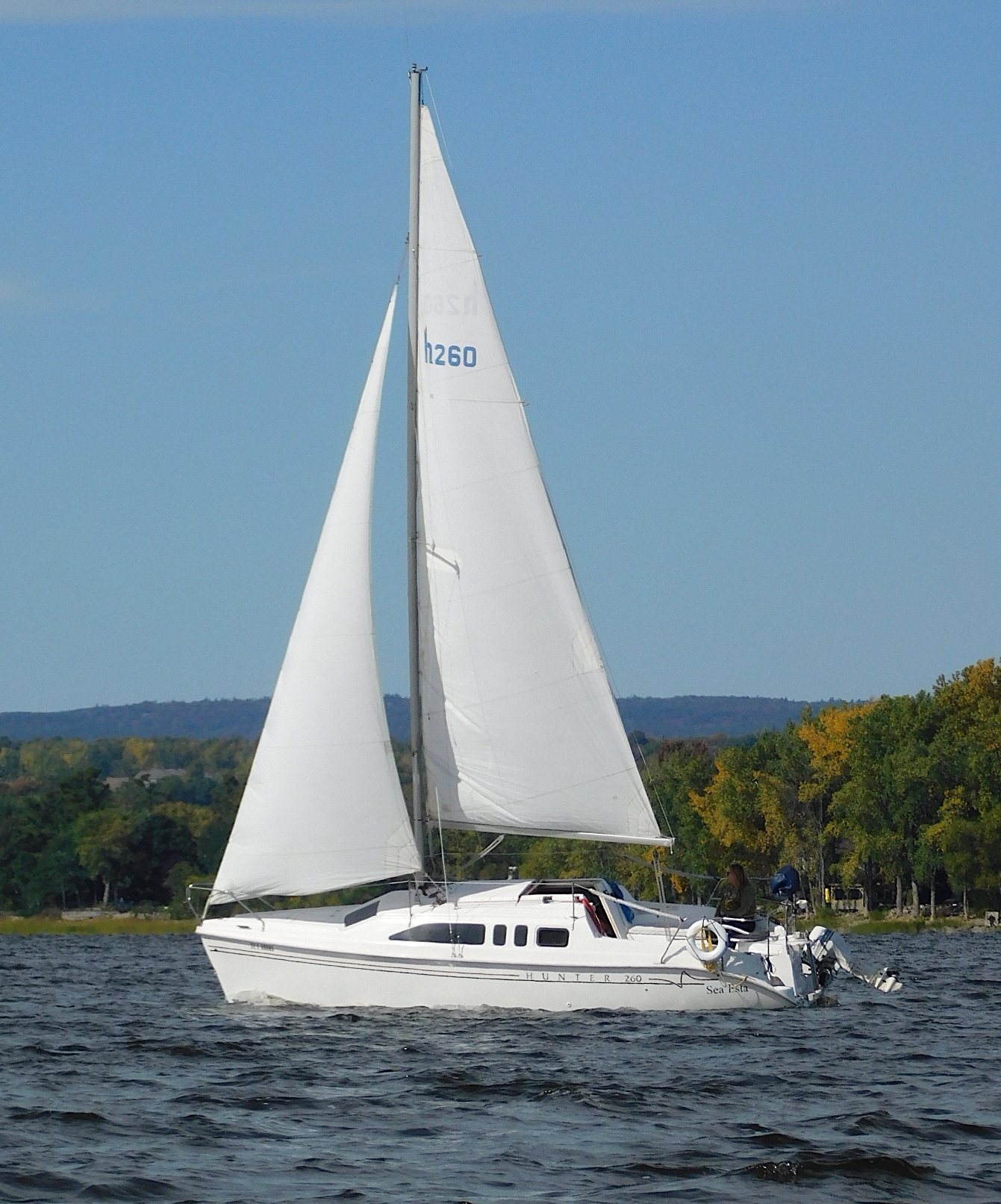

Development
- Designer: Rob Mazza and the Hunter Design Team
- Location: United States
- Year: 1997
- Builder: Hunter Marine
- Name: Hunter 260

Boat
- Displacement: 5,000 lb (2,268 kg)
- Draft: 6.00 ft (1.83 m) maximum

Hull
- Type: Monohull
- Construction: Fiberglass
- LOA: 26.25 ft (8.00 m)
- LWL: 23.25 ft (7.09 m)
- Beam: 8.96 ft (2.73 m)
- Engine: Outboard motor

Hull appendages
- Keel: centerboard
- Ballast: 2,000 lb (907 kg) of water
- Rudder: transom-mounted rudder

Rig
- General: Fractional B&R rigged sloop
- I foretriangle height: 29.21 ft (8.90 m)
- J foretriangle base: 9.46 ft (2.88 m)
- P mainsail luff: 30.54 ft (9.31 m)
- E mainsail foot: 10.50 ft (3.20 m)

Sails
- Mainsail area: 160.34 sq ft (14.896 m^{2})
- Jib/genoa area: 138.16 sq ft (12.835 m^{2})
- Total sail area: 298.50 sq ft (27.732 m^{2})

Racing
- PHRF: 213 (average)

The Hunter 260 is a recreational keelboat built by Hunter Marine in the United States between 1997 and 2005.

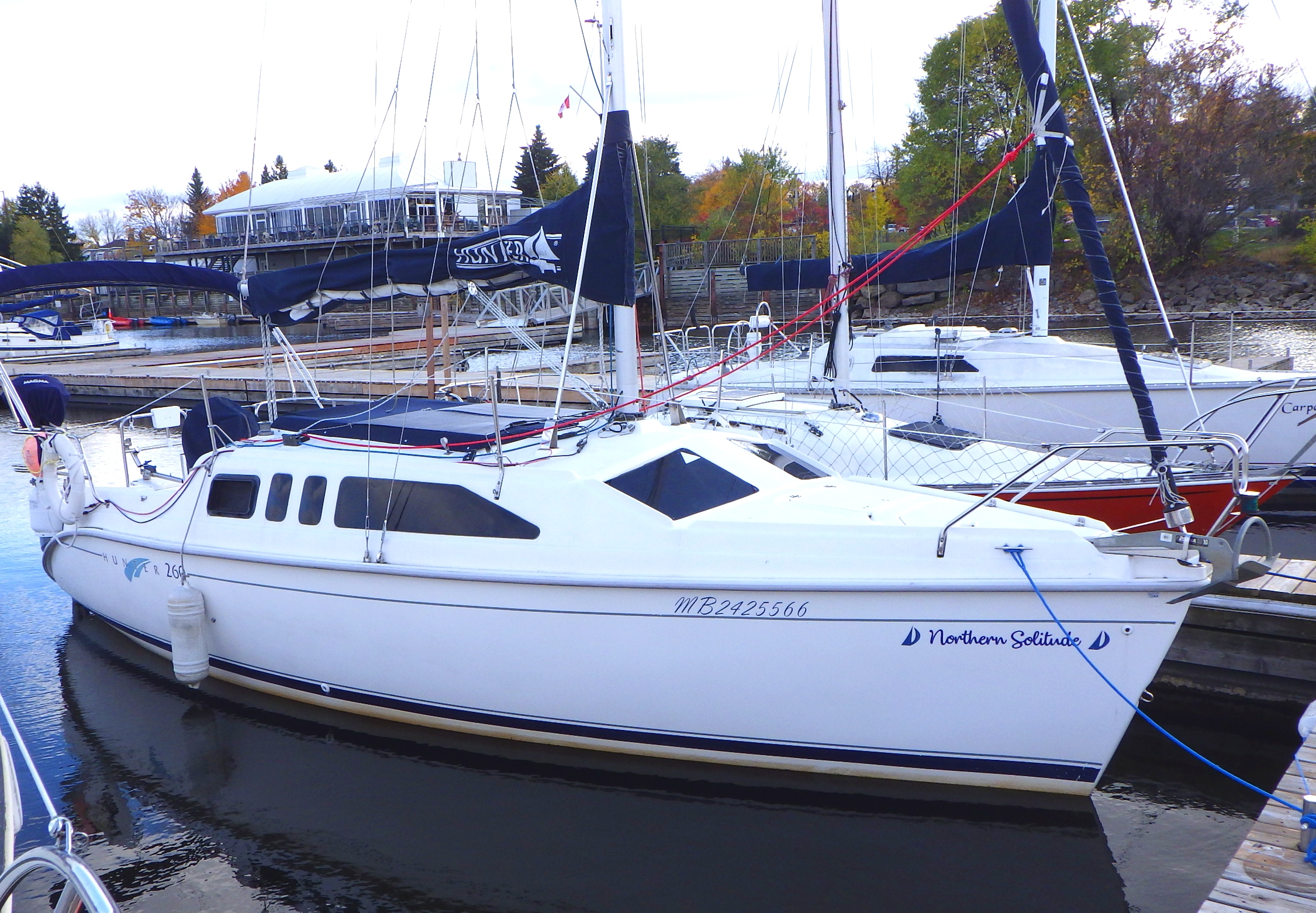
Hunter 260

The fiberglass hull has a transom-hung rudder and a folding centerboard keel. It displaces 5,000 lb (2,268 kg) and carries 2,000 lb (907 kg) of water ballast. It has a draft of 6.00 ft (1.83 m) with the centreboard extended and 1.75 ft (0.53 m) with it retracted. It has a hull speed of 6.46 kn (11.96 km/h).

It is a fractional B&R rigged sloop.
