= Hunter 27 Edge =

Sailboat class

Development
- Designer: Hunter Design Team
- Location: United States
- Year: 2006
- Builder: Hunter Marine
- Role: motorsailer
- Name: Hunter 27 Edge

Boat
- Displacement: 3,450 lb (1,565 kg)
- Draft: 4.92 ft (1.50 m) with centerboard down

Hull
- Type: Monohull
- Construction: Fiberglass
- LOA: 26.35 ft (8.03 m)
- LWL: 24.18 ft (7.37 m)
- Beam: 8.33 ft (2.54 m)
- Engine: Outboard motor

Hull appendages
- Keel: centerboard
- Ballast: 1,600 lb (726 kg) of water
- Rudder: internally-mounted spade-type rudder

Rig
- Rig type: B&R rig
- I foretriangle height: 23.67 ft (7.21 m)
- J foretriangle base: 11.48 ft (3.50 m)
- P mainsail luff: 24.83 ft (7.57 m)
- E mainsail foot: 12.25 ft (3.73 m)

Sails
- Sailplan: Fractional rigged sloop
- Mainsail area: 152.08 sq ft (14.129 m^{2})
- Jib/genoa area: 135.87 sq ft (12.623 m^{2})
- Total sail area: 287.95 sq ft (26.751 m^{2})

The Hunter 27 Edge is an American trailerable sailboat that was designed in 2006 by the Hunter Design Team as a hybrid motorsailer and first built in 2008.

The design was sold by the manufacturer under the marketing name TheEDGE, but is now usually referred to as the Hunter 27 Edge.

== Production ==
The design was built by Hunter Marine in the United States between 2008 and 2012, but it is now out of production.

== Design ==
The Hunter 27 Edge is a recreational motorsailer, built predominantly of fiberglass. It has a fractional sloop B&R rig, a raked stem, a walk-through reverse transom with a swimming platform, an internally-mounted spade-type rudder controlled by a wheel and a retractable centerboard keel.

The design displaces 3,450 lb (1,565 kg) empty of ballast, 5,048 lb (2,290 kg) with full water ballast and carries 1,598 lb (725 kg) of flooding water ballast. The ballast is required for sailing but is drained for road transport and powered use.

The boat has a draft of 4.92 ft (1.50 m) with the centreboard extended and 1.57 ft (0.48 m) with it retracted, allowing beaching or ground transportation on the included factory standard trailer.

The Hunter 27 Edge can be fitted with an outboard motor of up to 75 hp (56 kW), which can produce speeds of over 20 kn (37.04 km/h) in planing mode without water ballast. The design was advertised as being suitable for towing water skiers. The fuel tank holds 6 U.S. gallons (23 L; 5.0 imp gal) and the fresh water tank has a capacity of 2.5 U.S. gallons (9.5 L; 2.1 imp gal).

The design has a hull speed of 6.59 kn (12.20 km/h) when in displacement mode.

== See also ==
- List of sailing boat types

Related development

- Hunter 27
- Hunter 27-2
- Hunter 27-3
- Hunter 27X
