= Hunter 45 DS =

Sailboat class

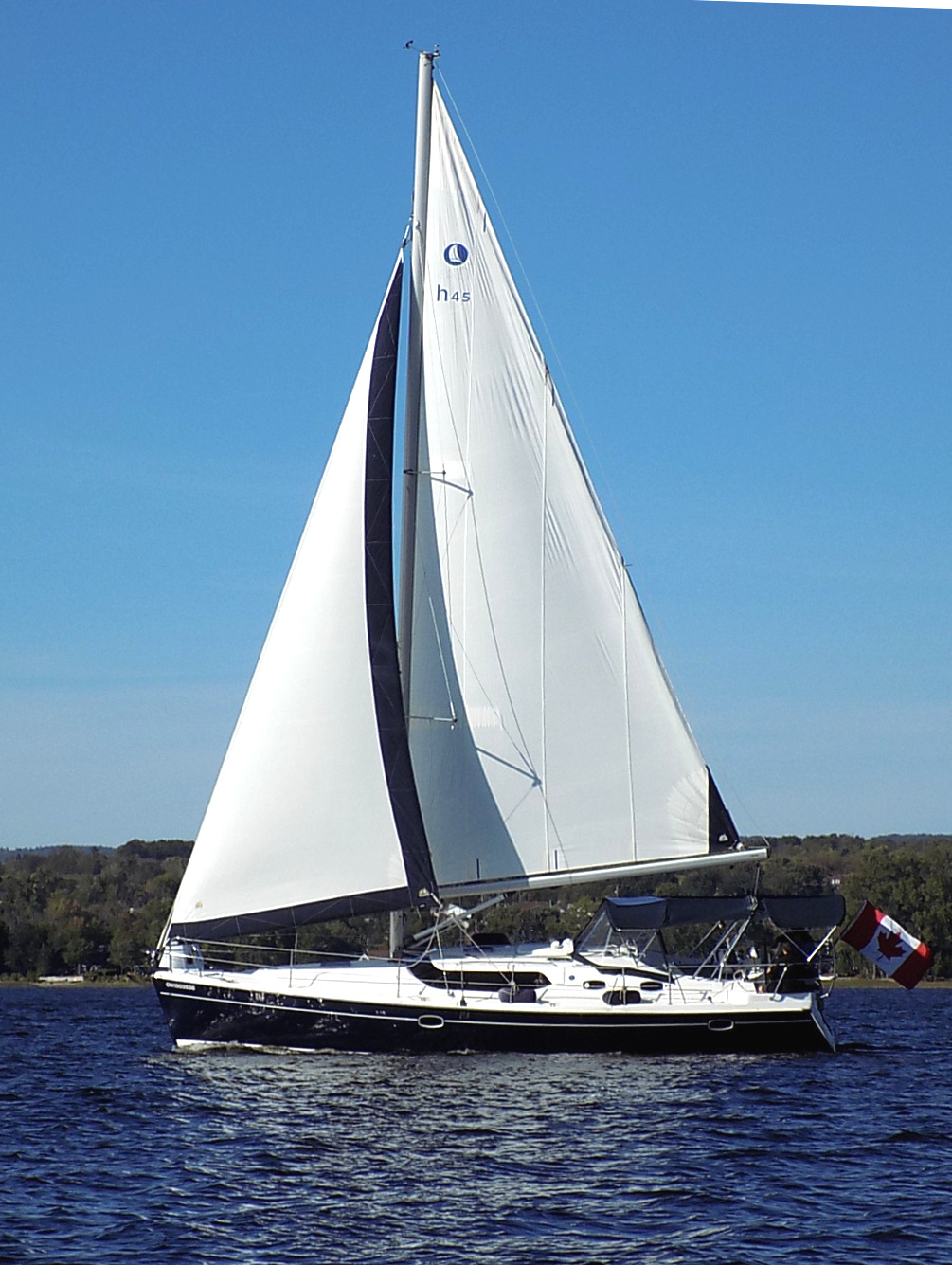
- Hunter 45 DS

Development
- Designer: Glenn Henderson
- Location: United States
- Year: 2006
- Builder: Hunter Marine
- Name: Hunter 45 DS

Boat
- Displacement: 22,937 lb (10,404 kg)
- Draft: 6.50 ft (1.98 m)

Hull
- Type: Monohull
- Construction: Fiberglass
- LOA: 44.82 ft (13.66 m)
- LWL: 39.17 ft (11.94 m)
- Beam: 14.50 ft (4.42 m)
- Engine: Yanmar 54 hp (40 kW) diesel engine

Hull appendages
- Keel: fin keel
- Ballast: 7,238 lb (3,283 kg) of iron
- Rudder: internally-mounted spade-type rudder

Rig
- General: Fractional B&R rig sloop
- I foretriangle height: 47.93 ft (14.61 m)
- J foretriangle base: 14.67 ft (4.47 m)
- P mainsail luff: 46.49 ft (14.17 m)
- E mainsail foot: 20.73 ft (6.32 m)

Sails
- Mainsail area: 481.87 sq ft (44.767 m^{2})
- Jib/genoa area: 351.57 sq ft (32.662 m^{2})
- Total sail area: 833.44 sq ft (77.429 m^{2})

The Hunter 45 DS and Hunter 45 CC are a family of American sailboats, that was first built in 2005/2006.

The design is often confused with the unrelated 1985 Hunter 45 and Hunter 45 Legend designs.

== Production ==
The boat series was built by Hunter Marine in the United States, but it is now out of production.

== Design ==
The Hunter 45 DS and CC series are both small recreational keelboats, built predominantly of fiberglass.

== Variants ==
Hunter 45 CC (Center Cockpit)
This model was designed by Glenn Henderson and the Hunter Design Team and introduced in 2005. It has a length overall of 45.01 ft (13.7 m), a waterline length of 39.17 ft (11.9 m), displaces 22,937 lb (10,404 kg) and carries 7,390 lb (3,352 kg) of ballast. The boat has a draft of 4.99 ft (1.52 m) with the standard keel and 6.5 ft (2.0 m) with the optional deep draft keel. The boat is fitted with a Japanese Yanmar diesel engine of 75 hp (56 kW). The fuel tank holds 76 U.S. gallons (290 L; 63 imp gal) and the fresh water tank has a capacity of 149 U.S. gallons (560 L; 124 imp gal). The boat has a PHRF racing average handicap of 84 with a high of 72 and low of 111. It has a hull speed of 8.39 kn (15.54 km/h).

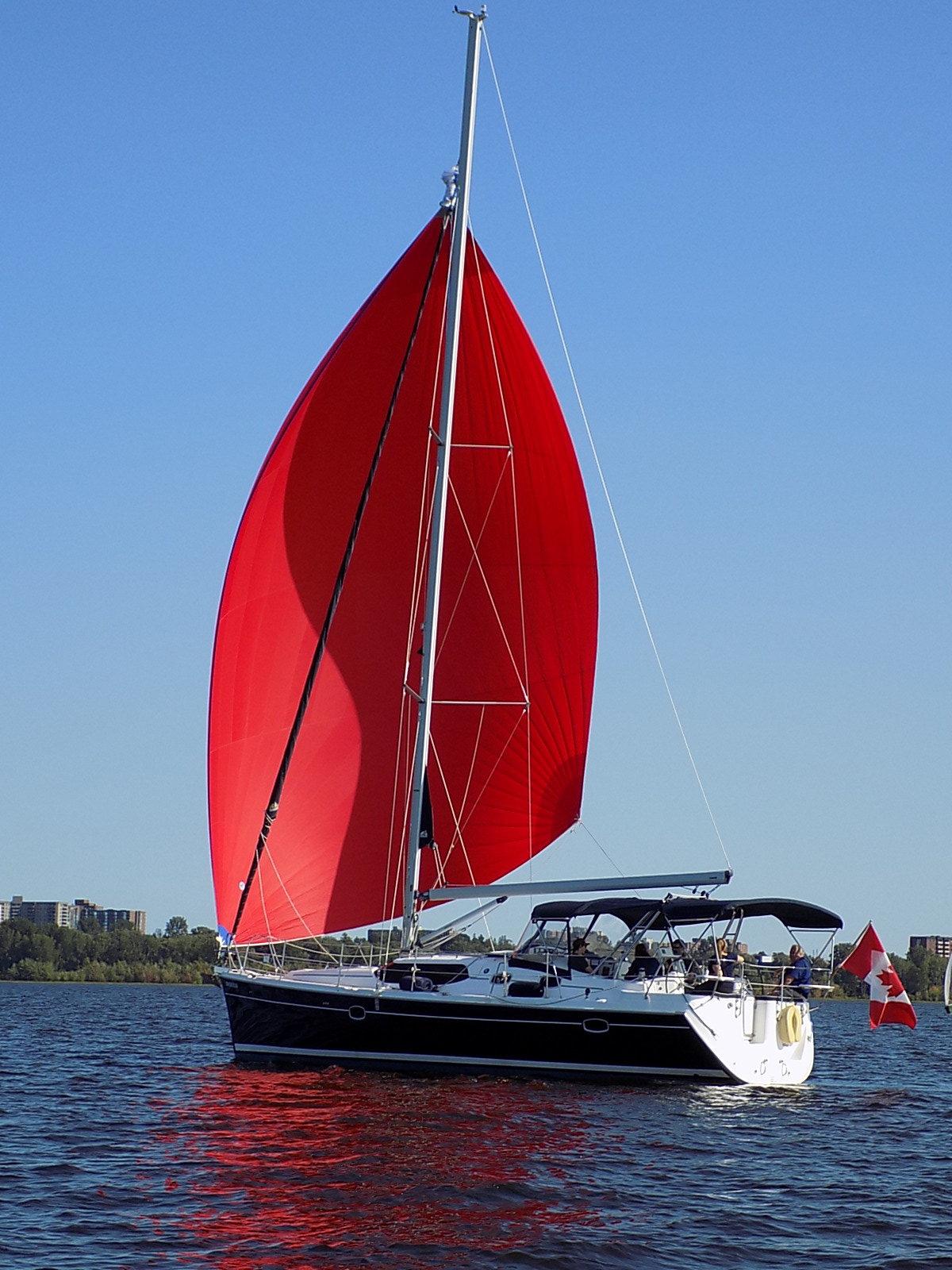
Hunter 45 DS flying a spinnaker

Hunter 45 DS (Deck Salon)
This model was designed by Glen Henderson and introduced in 2006 as updated version of the Hunter 44 DS. It has a length overall of 44.82 ft (13.7 m), a waterline length of 39.17 ft (11.9 m), displaces 22,937 lb (10,404 kg) and carries 7,238 lb (3,283 kg) of iron ballast. The boat has a draft of 6.50 ft (1.98 m) with the standard keel and 5.00 ft (1.52 m) with the optional shoal draft keel. The boat is fitted with a Japanese Yanmar diesel engine of 54 hp (40 kW). The fuel tank holds 66 U.S. gallons (250 L; 55 imp gal) and the fresh water tank has a capacity of 140 U.S. gallons (530 L; 120 imp gal).

== See also ==
- List of sailing boat types

Related development

- Hunter 45

Similar sailboats

- C&C 45
- Hunter 456
