= Hunter 456 =

Sailboat class

Development
- Designer: Hunter Design Team
- Location: United States
- Year: 2003
- Builder: Hunter Marine
- Name: Hunter 456

Boat
- Displacement: 26,180 lb (11,875 kg)
- Draft: 6.50 ft (1.98 m)

Hull
- Type: Monohull
- Construction: Fiberglass
- LOA: 46.1 ft (14.1 m)
- LWL: 39.67 ft (12.09 m)
- Beam: 14.00 ft (4.27 m)
- Engine: Yanmar 76 hp (57 kW) diesel engine

Hull appendages
- Keel: fin keel
- Ballast: 9,680 lb (4,391 kg)
- Rudder: internally-mounted spade-type rudder

Rig
- Rig type: Bermuda rig
- I foretriangle height: 55.42 ft (16.89 m)
- J foretriangle base: 16.92 ft (5.16 m)
- P mainsail luff: 49.92 ft (15.22 m)
- E mainsail foot: 16.83 ft (5.13 m)

Sails
- Sailplan: B&R rigged Masthead sloop
- Mainsail area: 420.08 sq ft (39.027 m^{2})
- Jib/genoa area: 468.85 sq ft (43.558 m^{2})
- Total sail area: 1,000.00 sq ft (92.903 m^{2})

The Hunter 456 is an American sailboat that was designed by the Hunter Design Team as a cruiser and first built in 2003.

== Production ==
The design was built by Hunter Marine in the United States, but it is now out of production.

== Design ==
The Hunter 456 is a recreational keelboat, built predominantly of fiberglass. It has a masthead sloop B&R rig, a raked stem, a walk-through reverse transom with a swimming platform and folding ladder, a center cockpit, an internally mounted spade-type rudder controlled by a wheel and a fixed fin keel or optional wing keel. With the fin keel it displaces 26,000 lb (11,793 kg) and carries 9,500 lb (4,309 kg) of lead ballast. With the wing keel it displaces 26,180 lb (11,875 kg) and carries 9,680 lb (4,391 kg) of lead ballast.

The boat has a draft of 6.50 ft (1.98 m) with the standard keel and 5.50 ft (1.68 m) with the optional shoal draft wing keel.

The boat is fitted with a Japanese Yanmar diesel engine of 78 hp (58 kW). The fuel tank holds 100 U.S. gallons (380 L; 83 imp gal) and the fresh water tank has a capacity of 200 U.S. gallons (760 L; 170 imp gal). The hot water tank has a capacity of 11 U.S. gallons (42 L; 9.2 imp gal) and the waste water holding tank holds 50 U.S. gallons (190 L; 42 imp gal).

Factory standard equipment included a 110% roller furling genoa, three two-speed self-tailing winches (one for rigging and two for the jib sheets), an electric self-tailing halyard winch, anodized spars, marine VHF radio, knotmeter, depth sounder, AM/FM radio and CD player with eight speakers, dual offset anchor rollers, hot and cold water transom shower, integral solar panel, sealed teak and holly cabin sole, two fully enclosed heads with showers, aft head bathtub, private forward and aft cabins, a dinette table that converts to a berth, complete set of kitchen dishes for six people and bedding, microwave oven, dual sinks, three-burner gimbaled liquid petroleum gas stove and oven, a fog bell and six life jackets. Factory options included in-mast mainsail furling, an asymmetrical spinnaker and rigging, a double aft cabin, air conditioning, clothing washer and drier, GPS and a Bimini top. Below decks the headroom is 77 in (196 cm).

The design has a hull speed of 8.44 kn (15.63 km/h).

== See also ==
- List of sailing boat types

Similar sailboats

- C&C 45
- Hunter 45
- Hunter 45 DS
- Hunter 460
- Hunter 466
- Hunter Passage 450
