= Hunter 466 =

Sailboat class

Development
- Designer: Hunter Design Team
- Location: United States
- Year: 2002
- Builder: Hunter Marine
- Name: Hunter 466

Boat
- Displacement: 26,180 lb (11,875 kg)
- Draft: 6.50 ft (1.98 m)

Hull
- Type: Monohull
- Construction: Fiberglass
- LOA: 46.08 ft (14.05 m)
- LWL: 39.67 ft (12.09 m)
- Beam: 14.00 ft (4.27 m)
- Engine: Yanmar 75 hp (56 kW) diesel engine

Hull appendages
- Keel: fin keel
- Ballast: 9,680 lb (4,391 kg)
- Rudder: internally-mounted spade-type rudder

Rig
- Rig type: Bermuda rig
- I foretriangle height: 55.33 ft (16.86 m)
- J foretriangle base: 17.00 ft (5.18 m)
- P mainsail luff: 51.42 ft (15.67 m)
- E mainsail foot: 18.00 ft (5.49 m)

Sails
- Sailplan: B&R rigged masthead sloop
- Mainsail area: 462.78 sq ft (42.994 m^{2})
- Jib/genoa area: 470.31 sq ft (43.693 m^{2})
- Total sail area: 933.09 sq ft (86.687 m^{2})

The Hunter 466 is an American sailboat that was designed by the Hunter Design Team as a cruiser and first built in 2002.

== Production ==
The design was built by Hunter Marine in the United States, but it is now out of production.

== Design ==
The Hunter 466 is a recreational keelboat, built predominantly of fiberglass, with wood trim. It has a B&R masthead sloop rig, a raked stem, a walk-through reverse transom with a swimming platform and folding ladder, an internally mounted spade-type rudder controlled by a wheel and a fixed fin keel or optional wing keel. the fin keel model displaces 26,180 lb (11,875 kg) and carries 9,680 lb (4,391 kg) of ballast, while the wing keel model displaces 26,000 lb (11,793 kg) and carries 9,500 lb (4,309 kg) of ballast

The boat has a draft of 6.50 ft (1.98 m) with the standard keel and 5.50 ft (1.68 m) with the optional shoal draft wing keel.

The boat is fitted with a Japanese Yanmar diesel engine of 75 hp (56 kW). The fuel tank holds 100 U.S. gallons (380 L; 83 imp gal) and the fresh water tank has a capacity of 200 U.S. gallons (760 L; 170 imp gal).

Factory standard equipment included a 110% roller furling genoa, full roach mainsail, two two-speed self tailing jib winches, two two-speed self rigging winches, an electric self tailing halyard winch, an electric anchor winch, anodized spars, marine VHF radio, knotmeter, depth sounder, AM/FM radio and CD player with six speakers, dual off-set anchor rollers, hot and cold water transom shower, integral solar panel, a sealed teak and holly cabin sole, two fully enclosed heads with showers, private forward and aft cabins, a dinette table that converts to a berth, a dual cabin ad workshop layout, six complete sets of kitchen dishes, microwave oven, dual sinks, three-burner gimbaled liquid petroleum gas stove and oven, a fog bell, emergency tiller and six life jackets. Factory options included a double aft cabin, air conditioning, mast furling mainsail, spinnaker and associated hardware, 8 gph water-maker and leather cushions.

The design has a hull speed of 8.44 kn (15.63 km/h).

== See also ==
- List of sailing boat types

Similar sailboats

- Hunter 45
- Hunter 456
- Hunter 460
