= C&C 45 =

Sailboat class

Development
- Designer: William Tripp III
- Location: United States
- Year: 2000
- Builder: C&C Yachts
- Name: C&C 45

Boat
- Displacement: 19,100 lb (8,664 kg)
- Draft: 8.75 ft (2.67 m)

Hull
- Type: Monohull
- Construction: Fiberglass
- LOA: 45.25 ft (13.79 m)
- LWL: 39.08 ft (11.91 m)
- Beam: 13.75 ft (4.19 m)
- Engine: Yanmar 4JHE 44 hp (33 kW) diesel engine

Hull appendages
- Keel: fin keel
- Ballast: 9,800 lb (4,445 kg)
- Rudder: internally-mounted spade-type rudder

Rig
- Rig type: Bermuda rig

Sails
- Sailplan: Fractional rigged sloop
- Total sail area: 1,107 sq ft (102.8 m^{2})

The C&C 45, also known as the IMS 45, is an American sailboat, that was designed by William Tripp III and first built in 2000.

== Production ==
The design was built by C&C Yachts in the United States, but it is now out of production.

== Design ==
The C&C 45 is a recreational keelboat, built predominantly of fiberglass. It has a fractional sloop rig, a nearly plumb stem, a reverse transom, an internally-mounted spade-type rudder controlled by a wheel and a fixed fin keel. It displaces 19,100 lb (8,664 kg) and carries 9,800 lb (4,445 kg) of ballast.

The boat has a draft of 8.75 ft (2.67 m) with the standard keel fitted.

The boat is fitted with a Japanese Yanmar 4JHE diesel engine of 44 hp (33 kW). The fuel tank holds 20 U.S. gallons (76 L; 17 imp gal) and the fresh water tank has a capacity of 60 U.S. gallons (230 L; 50 imp gal).

The design has a hull speed of 8.38 kn (15.52 km/h).

== See also ==
- List of sailing boat types

Similar sailboats

- Hunter 45
- Hunter 45 DS
- Hunter 456
- Hunter Passage 450
