= Hunter 45 =

Sailboat class

Development
- Designer: Warren Luhrs
- Location: United States
- Year: 1985
- Builder: Hunter Marine
- Name: Hunter 45

Boat
- Displacement: 22,450 lb (10,183 kg)
- Draft: 6.50 ft (1.98 m)

Hull
- Type: Monohull
- Construction: Fiberglass
- LOA: 46.672 ft (14.226 m)
- LWL: 39.58 ft (12.06 m)
- Beam: 13.83 ft (4.22 m)
- Engine: Diesel inboard engine

Hull appendages
- Keel: fin keel
- Ballast: 10,600 lb (4,808 kg) of lead
- Rudder: internally-mounted spade-type rudder

Rig
- General: B&R rig sloop
- I foretriangle height: 58.82 ft (17.93 m)
- J foretriangle base: 17.83 ft (5.43 m)
- P mainsail luff: 51.25 ft (15.62 m)
- E mainsail foot: 15.50 ft (4.72 m)

Sails
- Mainsail area: 397.19 sq ft (36.900 m^{2})
- Jib/genoa area: 528.38 sq ft (49.088 m^{2})
- Total sail area: 921.57 sq ft (85.617 m^{2})

Racing
- PHRF: 105 (average)

The Hunter 45 and Hunter 45 Legend are a family of American sailboats, that were first built in 1985.

The series is often confused with the later released Glen Henderson-designed 2005/2006 Hunter 45 DS and Hunter 45 CC.

== Production ==
The boat series was built by Hunter Marine in the United States, but it is now out of production. The Hunter 45 was produced from 1985 to 1987.

== Design ==
The Hunter 45 series are all recreational keelboats, built predominantly of fiberglass.

== Variants ==
Hunter 45
This model was designed by Warren Luhrs and introduced in 1985 and built until 1987. It has a length overall of 46.67 ft (14.2 m), a waterline length of 39.58 ft (12.1 m), displaces 22,450 lb (10,183 kg) and carries 10,600 lb (4,808 kg) of lead ballast. The boat has a draft of 6.50 ft (1.98 m) with the standard keel and 5.58 ft (1.70 m) with the optional wing keel. The boat is fitted with an inboard diesel engine. The fuel tank holds 47 U.S. gallons (180 L; 39 imp gal) and the fresh water tank has a capacity of 124 U.S. gallons (470 L; 103 imp gal). The standard keel-equipped boat has a PHRF racing average handicap of 105. The wing keel-equipped boat has a PHRF racing average handicap of 90 with a high of 78 and low of 105. Both keel models have hull speeds of 8.43 kn (15.61 km/h).
Hunter 45 Legend
A derivative of the Hunter 45, this model was also designed by Warren Luhrs and introduced in 1985. It has a length overall of 46.67 ft (14.2 m), a waterline length of 39.58 ft (12.1 m), displaces 25,300 lb (11,476 kg) and carries 10,600 lb (4,808 kg) of ballast. The boat has a draft of 6.50 ft (1.98 m) with the standard keel and 5.58 ft (1.70 m) with the optional shoal draft keel. The boat is fitted with a Japanese Yanmar diesel engine. The fuel tank holds 47 U.S. gallons (180 L; 39 imp gal) and the fresh water tank has a capacity of 124 U.S. gallons (470 L; 103 imp gal). The boat has a PHRF racing average handicap of 72 with a high of 84 and low of 66. It has a hull speed of 8.43 kn (15.61 km/h).

== See also ==
- List of sailing boat types

Similar sailboats

- C&C 45
- Hunter 456
- Hunter 460
- Hunter 466
- Hunter Passage 450
