= Hunter Passage 450 =

Sailboat class

Development
- Designer: Hunter Design Team
- Location: United States
- Year: 1996
- Builder: Hunter Marine
- Name: Hunter Passage 450

Boat
- Displacement: 26,180 lb (11,875 kg)
- Draft: 5.50 ft (1.68 m)

Hull
- Type: Monohull
- Construction: Fiberglass
- LOA: 44.25 ft (13.49 m)
- LWL: 38.58 ft (11.76 m)
- Beam: 14.00 ft (4.27 m)
- Engine: Volvo 78 hp (58 kW) diesel engine

Hull appendages
- Keel: wing keel with weighted bulb
- Ballast: 9,680 lb (4,391 kg)
- Rudder: internally-mounted spade-type rudder

Rig
- Rig type: Bermuda rig
- I foretriangle height: 55.42 ft (16.89 m)
- J foretriangle base: 16.92 ft (5.16 m)
- P mainsail luff: 49.38 ft (15.05 m)
- E mainsail foot: 16.82 ft (5.13 m) (17.82 ft (5.43 m) with the furling mainsail)

Sails
- Sailplan: B&R rigged Masthead sloop
- Mainsail area: 415.29 sq ft (38.582 m^{2})
- Jib/genoa area: 468.85 sq ft (43.558 m^{2})
- Total sail area: 884.14 sq ft (82.139 m^{2})

The Hunter Passage 450 is an American sailboat that was designed by the Hunter Design Team as a cruiser and first built in 1996.

== Production ==
The design was built by Hunter Marine in the United States, but it is now out of production.

== Design ==
The Hunter Passage 450 is a recreational keelboat, built primarily of hand-laid polyester and vinylester resin fiberglass. The deck is constructed as a fiberglass and marine plywood sandwich, while the hull above the waterline incorporates a Baltek end-grain balsa core. The design features a masthead sloop B&R rig, a raked stem, an oval-shaped center cockpit, a walk-through reverse transom with a swim platform and folding ladder, a fiberglass mainsheet arch, and an internally mounted spade-type rudder controlled by a wheel. It displaces 26,180 lb (11,875 kg) and carries 9,680 lb (4,391 kg) of lead ballast.

The standard wing keel with a weighted bulb provides a draft of 5.50 ft (1.68 m). Propulsion is supplied by either a Swedish Volvo or Japanese Yanmar diesel engine rated at 78 hp (58 kW). The fuel tank holds 100 U.S. gallons (380 L; 83 imp gal), and the fresh water tank has a capacity of 200 U.S. gallons (760 L; 170 imp gal).

Standard accommodations include dual staterooms with private heads and a transom-mounted hot and cold water shower. Factory options included air conditioning, a washer and dryer, a bathtub, and an in-mast furling mainsail. Below decks headroom is 78 in (200 cm). The design holds Community of Europe certification for "unlimited offshore use".

The boat has a calculated hull speed of 8.32 kn (15.41 km/h).

== Operational history ==
Reviewer Quentin Warren, writing for Cruising World in 2002 praised the design's accommodations. He wrote: "This boat is comfortable to be aboard, light and airy, easy to handle from the cockpit, big on tankage, chockablock with amenities and perks - it’s no surprise that people are queued well down boat-show docks for the obligatory look-see. It isn’t traditional or classic or reserved; rather it’s a showcase of modern thinking with liveaboard focus."

== See also ==
- List of sailing boat types

Similar sailboats

- C&C 45
- Hunter 45
- Hunter 456
