= Hunter 460 =

Sailboat class

Development
- Designer: Hunter Design Team
- Location: United States
- Year: 1999
- Builder: Hunter Marine
- Name: Hunter 460

Boat
- Displacement: 26,180 lb (11,875 kg)
- Draft: 6.50 ft (1.98 m)

Hull
- Type: Monohull
- Construction: Fiberglass
- LOA: 46.08 ft (14.05 m)
- LWL: 39.67 ft (12.09 m)
- Beam: 14.00 ft (4.27 m)
- Engine: Yanmar JH2HTE 76 hp (57 kW) diesel engine

Hull appendages
- Keel: fin keel
- Ballast: 9,680 lb (4,391 kg)
- Rudder: internally-mounted spade-type rudder

Rig
- Rig type: Bermuda rig
- I foretriangle height: 55.33 ft (16.86 m)
- J foretriangle base: 17.00 ft (5.18 m)
- P mainsail luff: 51.42 ft (15.67 m)
- E mainsail foot: 18.00 ft (5.49 m)

Sails
- Sailplan: B&R rigged masthead sloop
- Mainsail area: 462.78 sq ft (42.994 m^{2})
- Jib/genoa area: 470.31 sq ft (43.693 m^{2})
- Total sail area: 1,000.00 sq ft (92.903 m^{2})

Racing
- PHRF: 105 (average)

The Hunter 460 is an American sailboat that was designed by the Hunter Design Team as a cruiser and first built in 1999.

== Production ==
The design was built by Hunter Marine in the United States, starting in 1999, but it is now out of production.

== Design ==
The Hunter 460 is a recreational keelboat, built predominantly of fiberglass. It has a B&R masthead sloop rig, a raked stem, a walk-through reverse transom with a swimming platform and folding ladder, an internally mounted spade-type rudder controlled by a wheel and a fixed fin keel or optional bulb wing keel. With the fin keel it displaces 26,180 lb (11,875 kg) and carries 9,680 lb (4,391 kg) of ballast. With the wing keel it displaces 26,000 lb (11,793 kg) and carries 9,500 lb (4,309 kg) of ballast.

The boat has a draft of 6.50 ft (1.98 m) with the standard keel and 5.50 ft (1.68 m) with the optional shoal draft keel.

The boat is fitted with a Japanese Yanmar JH2HTE diesel engine of 76 hp (57 kW). The fuel tank holds 100 U.S. gallons (380 L; 83 imp gal) and the fresh water tank has a capacity of 200 U.S. gallons (760 L; 170 imp gal).

Factory options included a two cabin and workshop arrangement, a three cabin and four cabin configuration. Standard equipment included an electric halyard winch, self-draining transom propane lockers, dual offset anchor rollers and a full-beam aft cockpit.

The design has a PHRF racing average handicap of 105 with a high of 108 and low of 95. It has a hull speed of 8.44 kn (15.63 km/h).

== See also ==
- List of sailing boat types

Similar sailboats

- Hunter 45
- Hunter 456
- Hunter 466
