= Hunter 29.5 =

Sailboat class

Development
- Designer: Rob Mazza and the Hunter Design Team
- Location: United States
- Year: 1994
- Builder: Hunter Marine

Boat
- Displacement: 7,500 lb (3,402 kg)
- Draft: 4.00 ft (1.22 m)

Hull
- Type: Monohull
- Construction: Fiberglass
- LOA: 29.50 ft (8.99 m)
- LWL: 27.00 ft (8.23 m)
- Beam: 10.50 ft (3.20 m)
- Engine: Yanmar inboard diesel engine

Hull appendages
- Keel: fin keel
- Ballast: 2,680 lb (1,216 kg)
- Rudder: internally-mounted spade-type/transom-mounted rudder

Rig
- General: fractional sloop
- I foretriangle height: 34.00 ft (10.36 m)
- J foretriangle base: 10.33 ft (3.15 m)
- P mainsail luff: 36.33 ft (11.07 m)
- E mainsail foot: 12.67 ft (3.86 m)

Sails
- Mainsail area: 230.15 sq ft (21.382 m^{2})
- Jib/genoa area: 175.61 sq ft (16.315 m^{2})
- Total sail area: 405.76 sq ft (37.696 m^{2})

Rating
- PHRF: 189 (average)

The Hunter 29.5 is an American sailboat, that was designed by Rob Mazza and the Hunter Design Team and first built in 1994.

The design was developed into the Moorings 295 for the charter market in 1994.

== Production ==
The boat was built by Hunter Marine in the United States between 1994 and 1997, but it is now out of production.

== Design ==
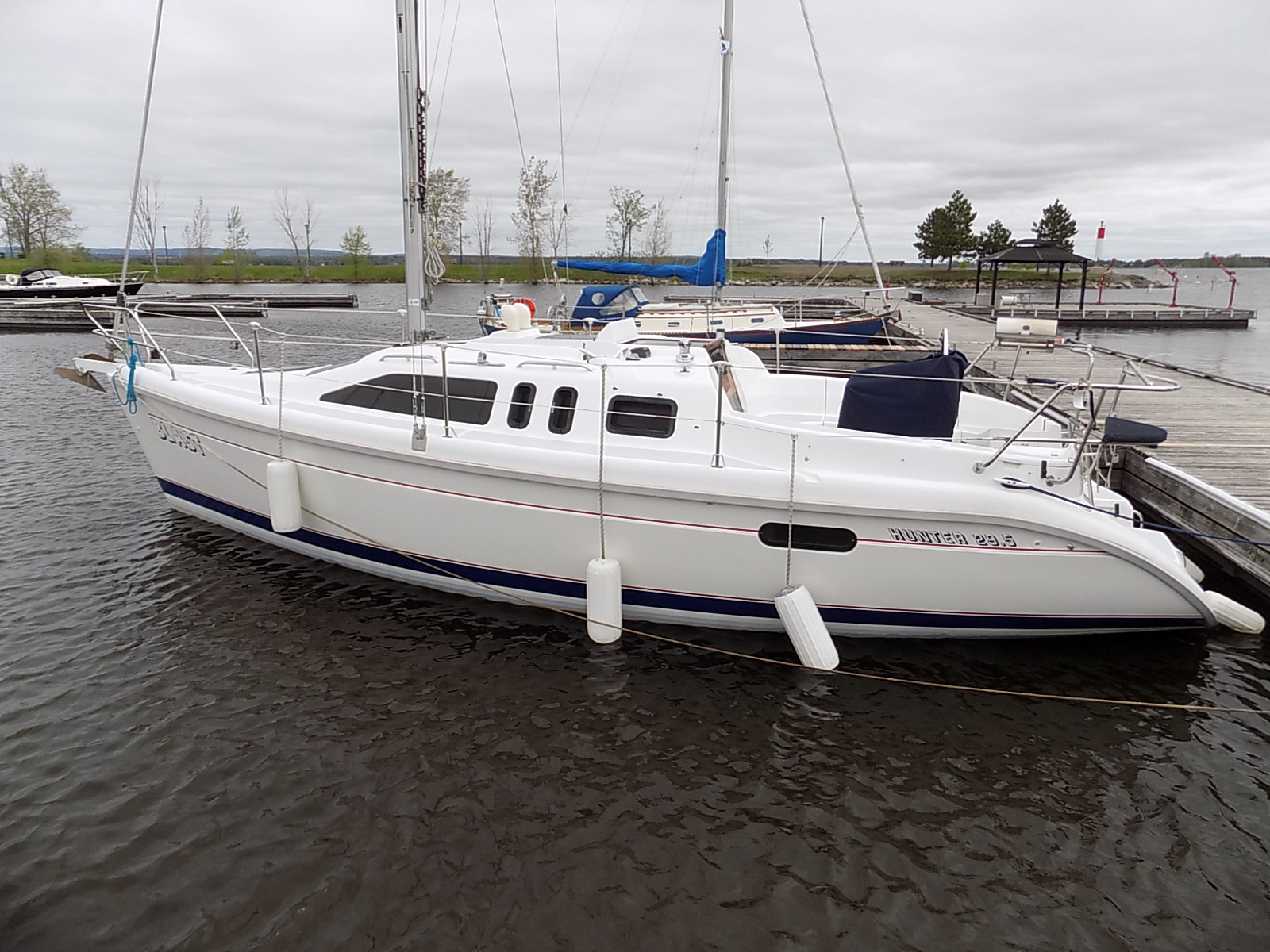
Hunter 29.5

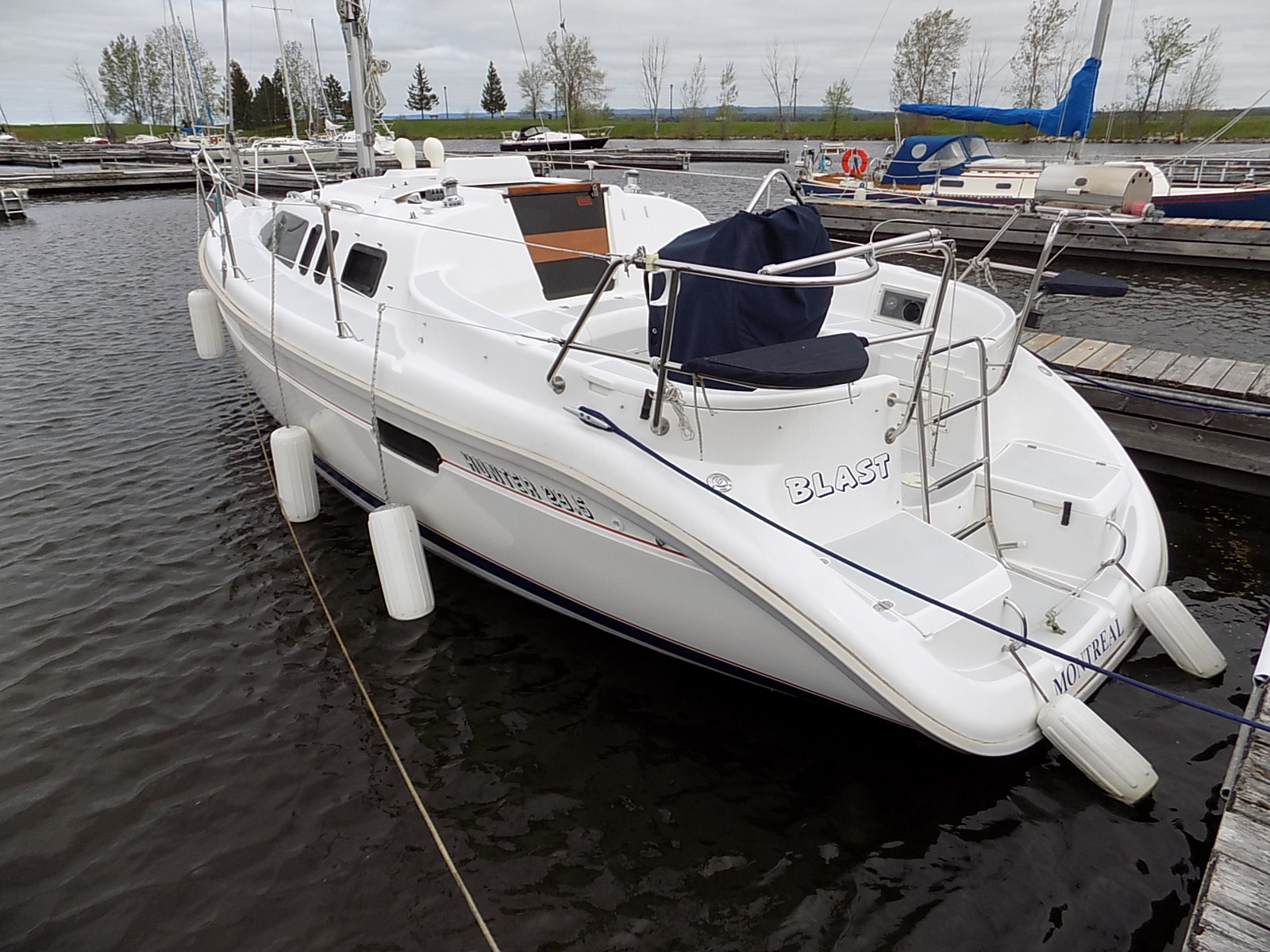
Hunter 29.5 showing detail of the walk-through transom design

The Hunter 29.5 is a small recreational keelboat, built predominantly of fiberglass. It has a fractional sloop rig, an internally-mounted spade-type rudder, a fixed fin keel and a walk-through transom design. It displaces 7,500 lb (3,402 kg) and carries 2,680 lb (1,216 kg) of ballast.

The boat has a draft of 4.00 ft (1.22 m) with the standard keel fitted.

The boat is fitted with a Japanese Yanmar diesel engine. The fuel tank holds 20 U.S. gallons (76 L; 17 imp gal) and the fresh water tank has a capacity of 40 U.S. gallons (150 L; 33 imp gal).

The boat has a PHRF racing average handicap of 189 with a high of 198 and low of 183. It has a hull speed of 6.96 kn (12.89 km/h).

== See also ==
- List of sailing boat types
