= B32 =

B32 or B-32 may refer to:

- B Boats B-32, an American sailboat design
- B-32, an armour-piercing incendiary full metal jacket round with a tungsten-carbide core used by the Soviet KPV heavy machine gun
- B-32 Dominator, an American heavy bomber of World War II
- Bryan "Birdman" Williams, formerly known as B-32
- 32 amp, type B – a standard circuit breaker current rating
