= Beneteau Oceanis 321 =

Sailboat class

Oceanis 321
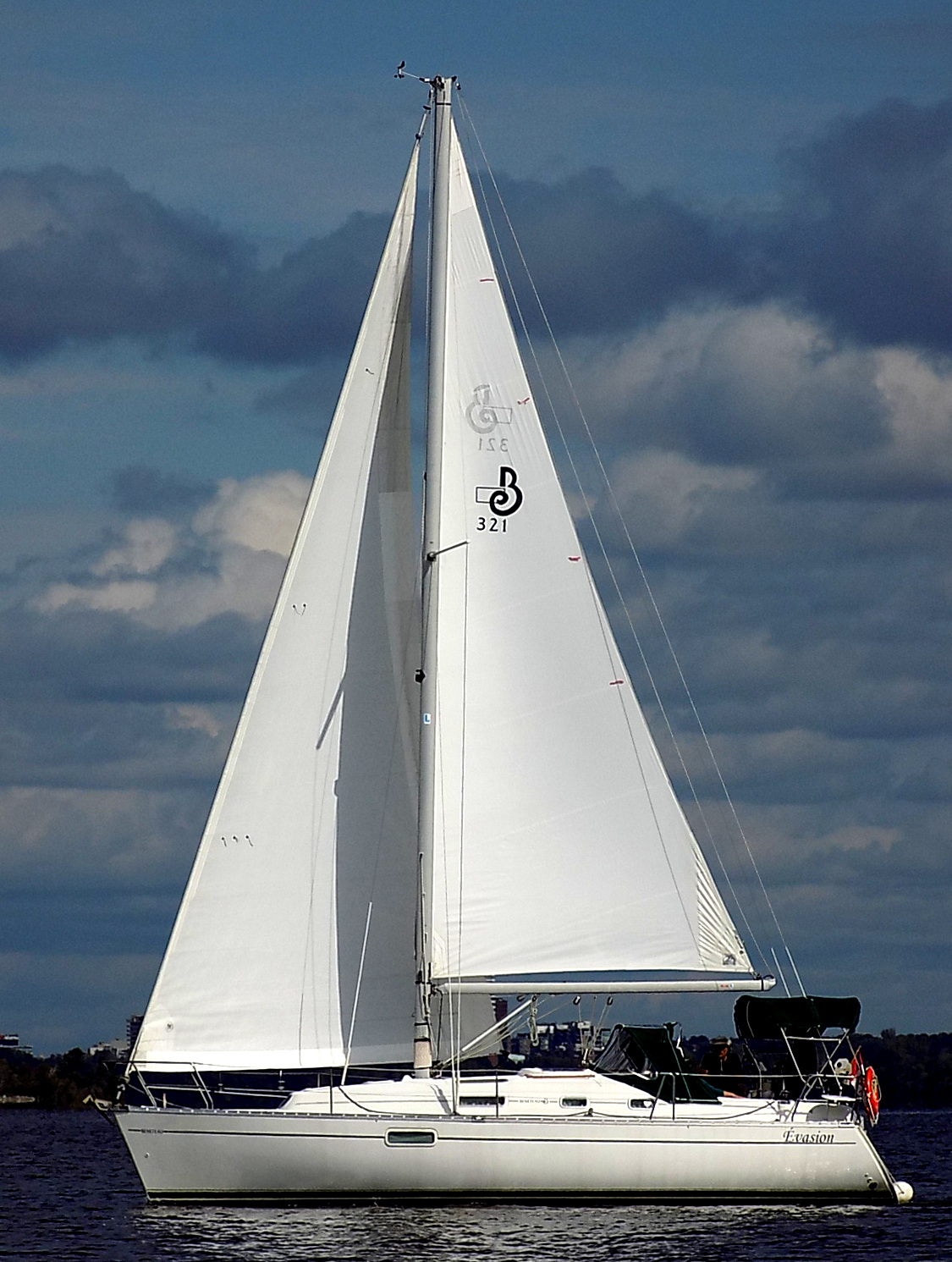

Development
- Designer: Group Finot
- Location: France
- Year: 1995
- No. built: 848
- Builder: Beneteau
- Name: Oceanis 321

Boat
- Displacement: 9,700 lb (4,400 kg)
- Draft: 4.26 ft (1.30 m)

Hull
- Type: Monohull
- Construction: Fiberglass
- LOA: 32.64 ft (9.95 m)
- LWL: 29.36 ft (8.95 m)
- Beam: 11.22 ft (3.42 m)
- Engine: Volvo diesel engine

Hull appendages
- Keel: fin keel with bulb
- Ballast: 3,000 lb (1,361 kg)
- Rudder: internally-mounted spade-type rudder

Rig
- General: Masthead sloop

Sails
- Total sail area: 500 sq ft (46 m^{2})

The Beneteau Oceanis 321 is a French sailboat that was designed by Group Finot and first built in 1995.

== Production ==
The boat was built by Beneteau in France starting in 1995, with 848 examples completed, but it is now out of production.

The Oceanis 321 design was also sold under the names Moorings 321, Moorings 322, Stardust 322 and Stardust 323. The Oceanis 321 Clipper was a version with many options included as standard equipment.

== Design ==
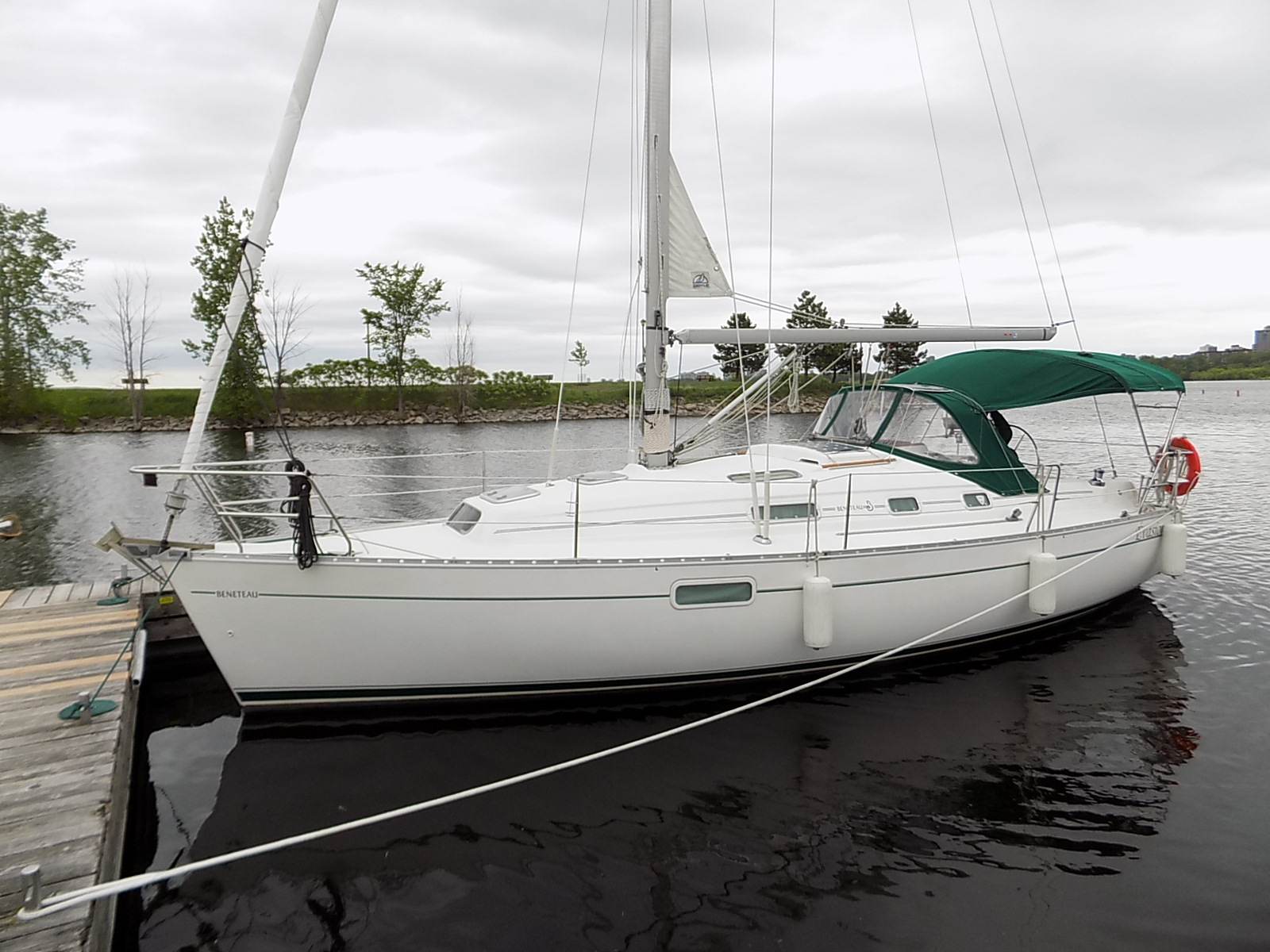
Beneteau Oceanis 321

The Oceanis 321 is a recreational keelboat, built predominantly of fiberglass. It has a masthead sloop rig, an internally-mounted spade-type rudder and a fixed fin keel with a weighted bulb. It displaces 9,700 lb (4,400 kg) and carries 3,000 lb (1,361 kg) of ballast.

The boat has a draft of 4.26 ft (1.30 m) with the standard keel fitted. The Oceanis 321 is fitted with a Swedish Volvo diesel engine. The fuel tank holds 16 U.S. gallons (61 L; 13 imp gal) and the fresh water tank has a capacity of 72 U.S. gallons (270 L; 60 imp gal).

The boat has a hull speed of 7.26 kn (13.45 km/h).

== See also ==
- List of sailing boat types

Similar sailboats

- Bayfield 30/32
- B-Boats B-32
- C&C 32
- C&C 99
- Catalina 320
- Contest 32 CS
- Hunter 32 Vision
- Hunter 326
- J/32
- Mirage 32
- Nonsuch 324
- Ontario 32
- Ranger 32
