= C&C 26 Wave =

Sailboat class

Development
- Designer: Robert W. Ball
- Location: Canada
- Year: 1988
- Builder: C&C Yachts
- Name: C&C 26 Wave

Boat
- Displacement: 4,700 lb (2,132 kg)
- Draft: 2.92 ft (0.89 m)

Hull
- Type: Monohull
- Construction: Fiberglass
- LOA: 26.67 ft (8.13 m)
- LWL: 23.00 ft (7.01 m)
- Beam: 9.25 ft (2.82 m)
- Engine: Universal M-12 diesel engine

Hull appendages
- Keel: wing keel
- Ballast: 1,700 lb (771 kg)
- Rudder: transom-mounted rudder

Rig
- General: Masthead sloop

Sails
- Total sail area: 292 sq ft (27.1 m^{2})

Racing
- PHRF: 219 (average)

The C&C 26 Wave is a Canadian sailboat, that was designed by C&C designer Robert W. Ball and first built in 1988.

Despite its name, the C&C 26 Wave is a development of the C&C 27 Mark V and not the C&C 26.

== Production ==
The boat was built by C&C Yachts in Canada, starting in 1988, but it is now out of production.

== Design ==
The C&C 26 Wave is a small recreational keelboat, built predominantly of fiberglass, with wood trim. It has a masthead sloop rig, a transom-hung rudder and a fixed wing keel. It displaces 4,700 lb (2,132 kg) and carries 1,700 lb (771 kg) of iron ballast.

The boat has a draft of 2.92 ft (0.89 m) with the standard wing keel fitted. The boat is fitted with a Universal M-12 diesel engine.

The design has a PHRF racing average handicap of 219 with a high of 231 and low of 210. It has a hull speed of 6.43 kn (11.91 km/h).

== See also ==
- List of sailing boat types
