= Catalina 320 =

Sailboat class

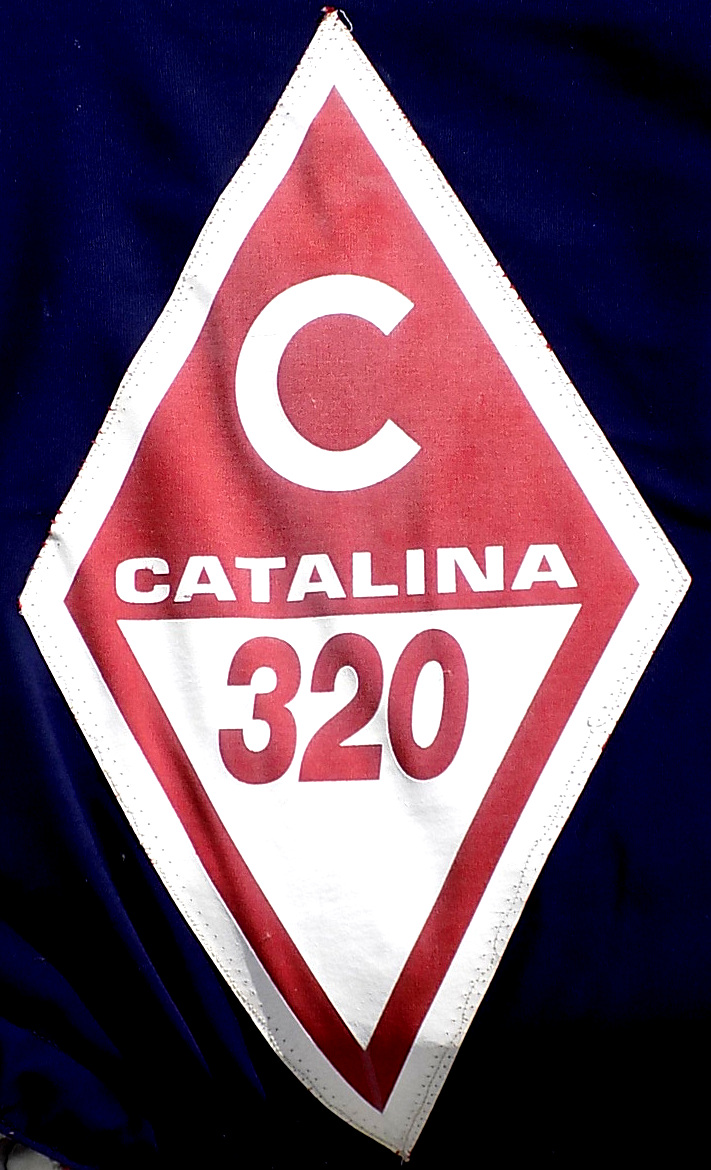
- Class symbol

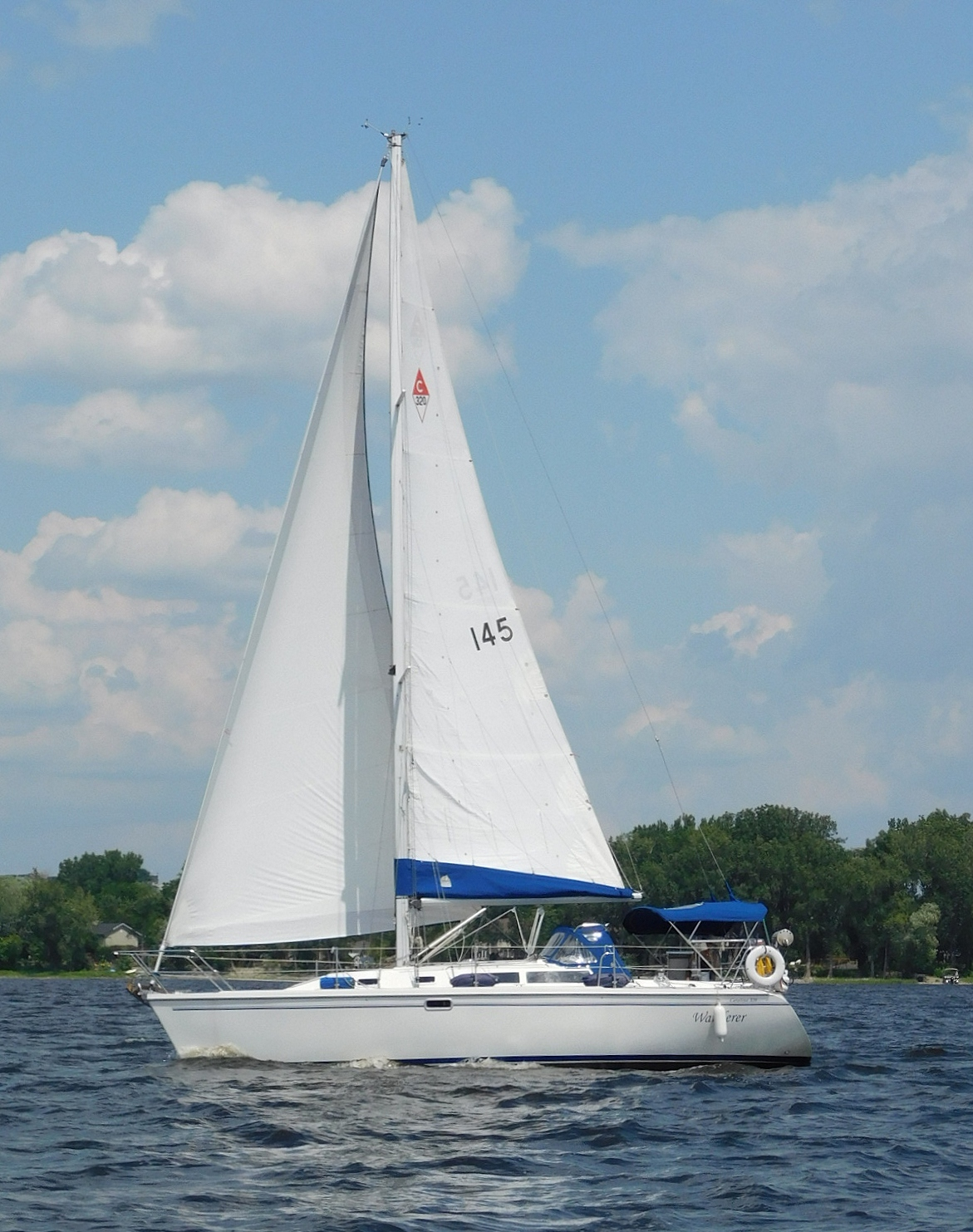

Development
- Designer: Gerry Douglas
- Location: United States
- Year: 1993
- Builder: Catalina Yachts
- Name: Catalina 320

Boat
- Displacement: 11,300 lb (5,126 kg)
- Draft: 6.46 ft (1.97 m)

Hull
- Type: Monohull
- Construction: Fiberglass
- LOA: 32.50 ft (9.91 m)
- LWL: 28.00 ft (8.53 m)
- Beam: 11.75 ft (3.58 m)
- Engine: Yanmar 3GM30F diesel engine, 27 hp (20 kW)

Hull appendages
- Keel: fin bulb keel
- Ballast: 4,000 lb (1,814 kg)
- Rudder: internally-mounted spade-type rudder

Rig
- General: Masthead sloop
- I foretriangle height: 43.58 ft (13.28 m)
- J foretriangle base: 12.33 ft (3.76 m)
- P mainsail luff: 38.00 ft (11.58 m)
- E mainsail foot: 13.25 ft (4.04 m)

Sails
- Mainsail area: 251.75 sq ft (23.388 m^{2})
- Jib/genoa area: 268.67 sq ft (24.960 m^{2})
- Total sail area: 520.42 sq ft (48.349 m^{2})

Racing
- PHRF: 159 (average)

The Catalina 320 is an American sailboat, that was designed by Gerry Douglas and first built in 1993.

== Production ==
The boat was built by Catalina Yachts in the United States starting in 1993. The design is now out of production.

== Design ==
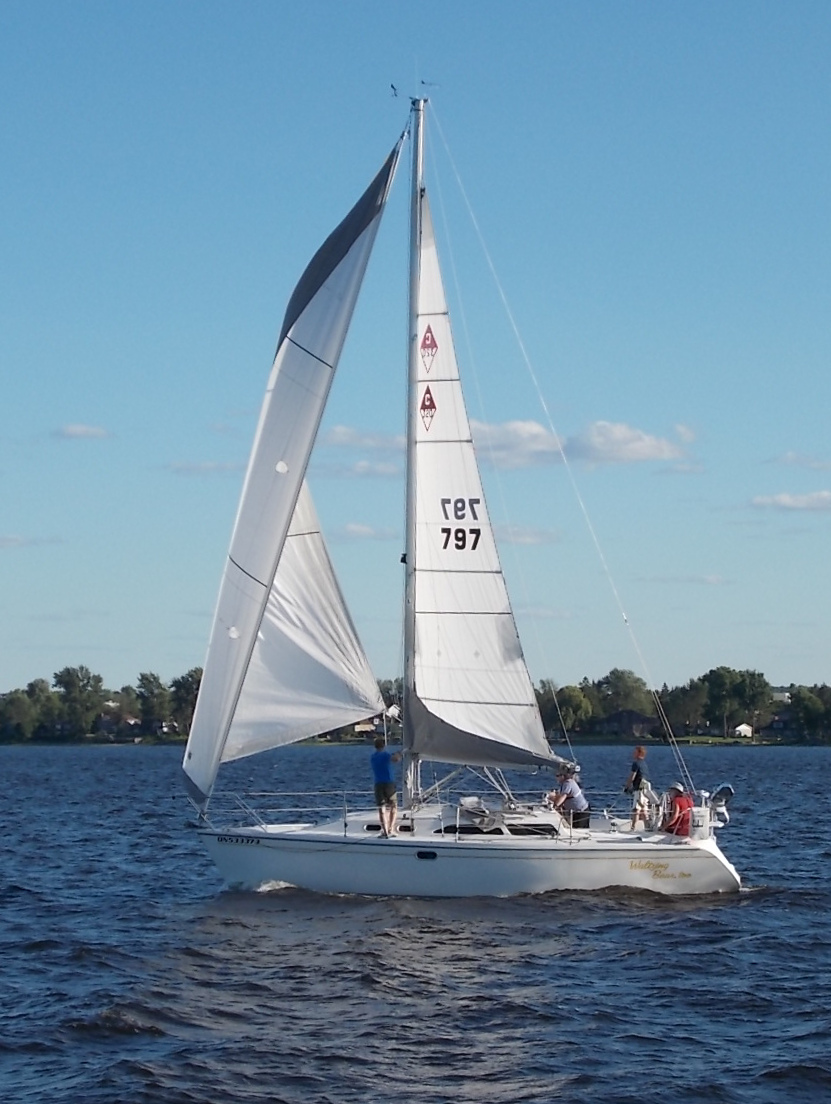
Catalina 320

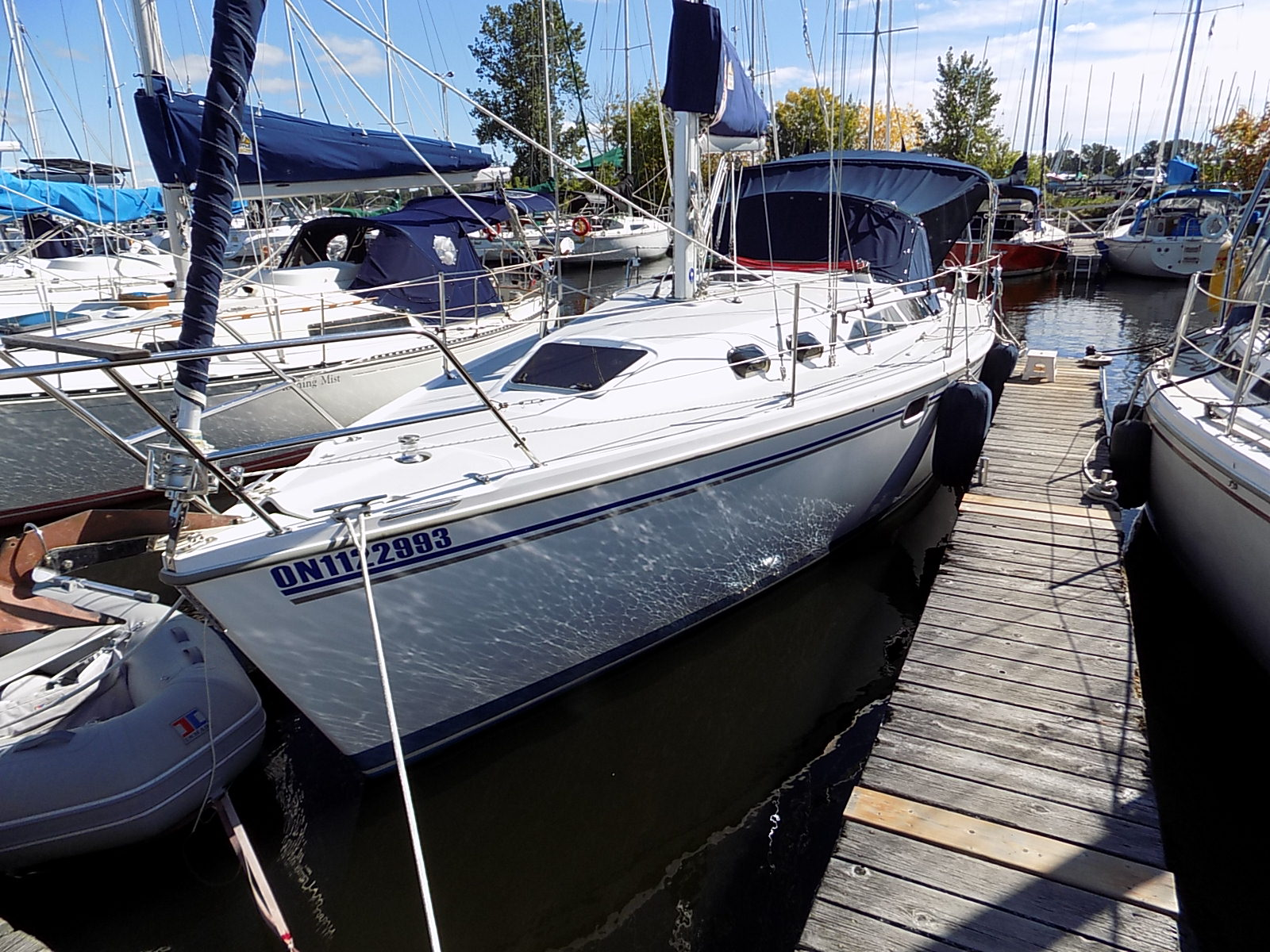
Catalina 320

The Catalina 320 is a small recreational keelboat, built predominantly of fiberglass. It has a masthead sloop rig, an internally-mounted spade-type rudder and a fixed fin bulb keel. It displaces 11,300 lb (5,126 kg) and carries 4,000 lb (1,814 kg) of ballast.

The design has a hull speed of 7.09 kn (13.13 km/h).

== Variants ==
Catalina 320
Original model introduced in 1993. This version has a draft of 6.46 ft (1.97 m) with the standard keel and 4.25 ft (1.30 m) with the optional shoal draft wing keel. This model is fitted with a Perkins Engines M30 (1993-1994), Westerbeke 29B (1995-1996), or Japanese Yanmar 3GM30F diesel engine of 27 hp (20 kW) (1997-). The fin keel model has a PHRF racing average handicap of 159 with a high of 170 and low of 147. The wing keel model has a PHRF racing average handicap of 153 with a high of 165 and low of 141. It has a hull speed of 7.09 kn (13.13 km/h).
Catalina 320 Mark II
Improved model introduced in 2006. This version has a draft of 6.25 ft (1.91 m) with the standard keel and 4.33 ft (1.32 m) with the optional shoal draft wing keel. This model is fitted with a Japanese Yanmar diesel engine of 29 hp (22 kW). The fuel tank holds 19 U.S. gallons (72 L; 16 imp gal) and the fresh water tank has a capacity of 51 U.S. gallons (190 L; 42 imp gal).

== See also ==
- List of sailing boat types

Similar sailboats

- Bayfield 30/32
- B Boats B-32
- Beneteau Oceanis 321
- C&C 32
- C&C 99
- Douglas 32
- Hunter 32 Vision
- Hunter 326
- J/32
- Mirage 32
- Nonsuch 324
- Ontario 32
- Ranger 32
