= C&C 99 =

Sailboat class

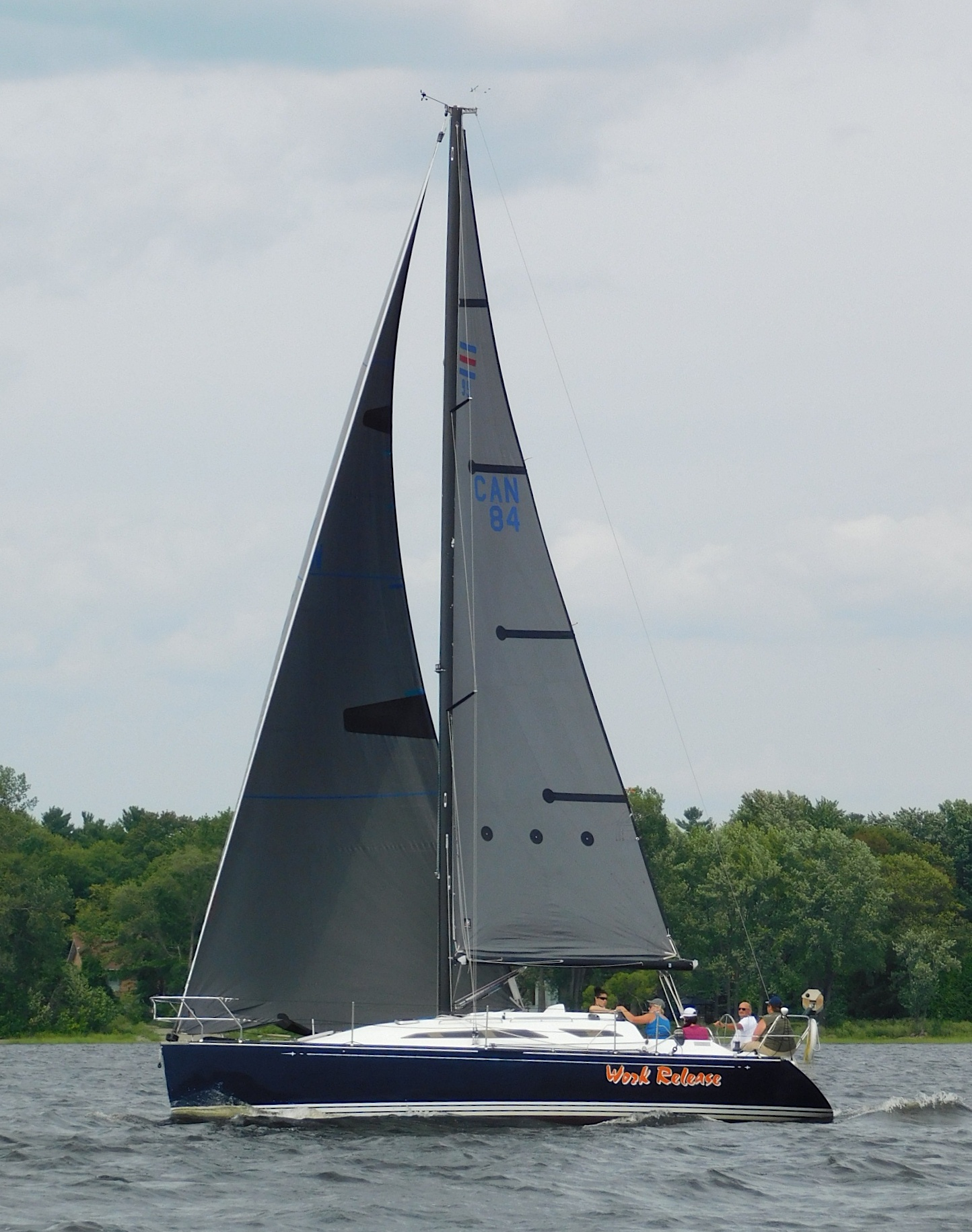

Development
- Designer: Tim Jackett
- Location: United States
- Year: 2002
- Builder: C&C Yachts
- Name: C&C 99

Boat
- Displacement: 9,265 lb (4,203 kg)
- Draft: 5.50 ft (1.68 m)

Hull
- Type: Monohull
- Construction: Fiberglass
- LOA: 32.50 ft (9.91 m)
- LWL: 29.08 ft (8.86 m)
- Beam: 10.83 ft (3.30 m)
- Engine: Volvo 2020SD 19 hp (14 kW) diesel engine

Hull appendages
- Keel: fin keel
- Ballast: 3,500 lb (1,588 kg)
- Rudder: internally-mounted spade-type rudder

Rig
- General: Masthead sloop
- I foretriangle height: 46.00 ft (14.02 m)
- J foretriangle base: 13.00 ft (3.96 m)
- P mainsail luff: 40.50 ft (12.34 m)
- E mainsail foot: 13.00 ft (3.96 m)

Sails
- Mainsail area: 263.25 sq ft (24.457 m^{2})
- Jib/genoa area: 299.00 sq ft (27.778 m^{2})
- Total sail area: 562.25 sq ft (52.235 m^{2})

Racing
- PHRF: 102 (average)

The C&C 99 is an American sailboat, that was designed by Tim Jackett and entered production in 2002.

== Production ==
The boat was built by C&C Yachts in the United States, but it is now out of production.

== Design ==
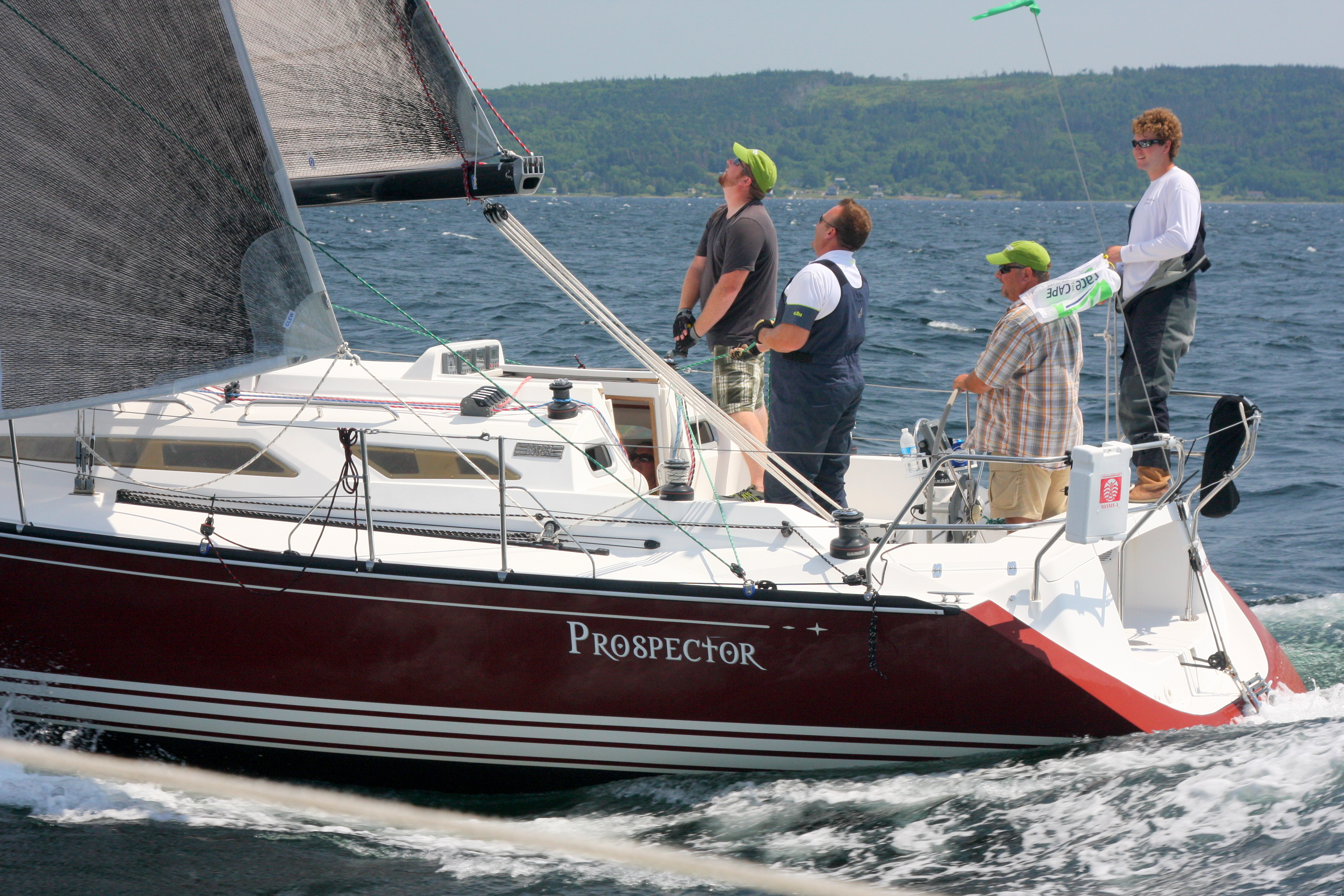
The C&C 99 Prospector

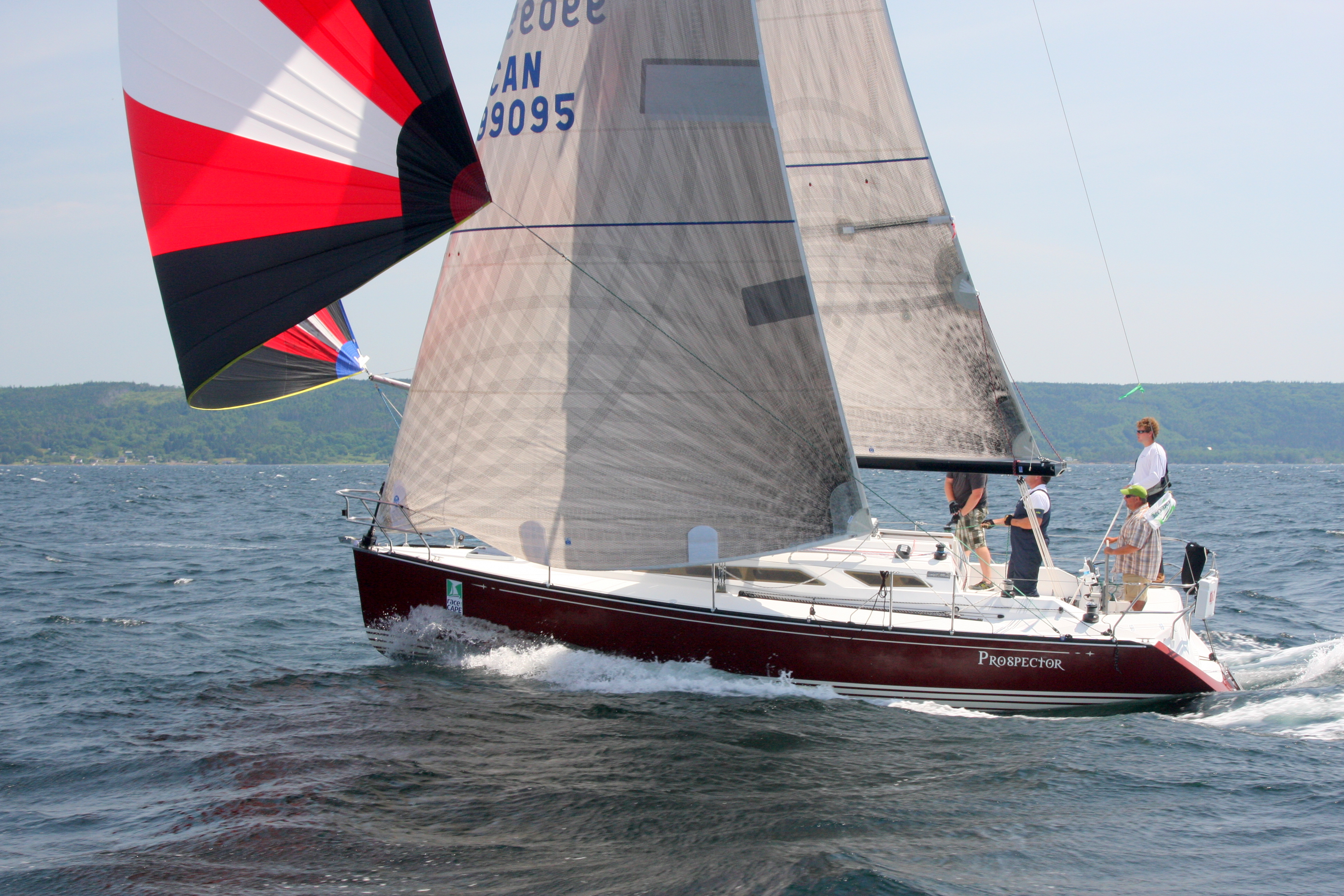
The C&C 99 Prospector competing in the Barra Strait Cup, one leg of Race the Cape 2014 in the Bras d'Or Lake, Cape Breton Island.

The C&C 99 is a small recreational keelboat, built predominantly with from fiberglass. It has a masthead sloop rig, an internally-mounted spade-type rudder and a fixed fin keel. It displaces 9,265 lb (4,203 kg) and carries and 3,500 lb (1,588 kg) of lead ballast.

The design had a choice of keels. There was an option of a standard keel with a draft of 5.50 ft (1.68 m) and a deep keel with a draft of 6.50 ft (1.98 m). The deep draft keel was later removed as an option.

The design was originally delivered with aluminum spars, but this was later changed to carbon fiber.

The boat is fitted with a Volvo 2020SD 19 hp (14 kW) diesel inboard engine. Its fuel tank holds 20 U.S. gallons (76 L; 17 imp gal) and the fresh water tank has a capacity of 40 U.S. gallons (150 L; 33 imp gal).

The boat has a PHRF racing average handicap of 102 with a high of 108 and low of 96. It has a hull speed of 7.23 kn (13.39 km/h).

== See also ==
- List of sailing boat types

Similar sailboats

- Bayfield 30/32
- B-Boats B-32
- Beneteau Oceanis 321
- C&C 32
- Catalina 320
- Douglas 32
- Hunter 32
- Hunter 326
- J/32
- Mirage 32
- Nonsuch 324
- Ontario 32
- Ranger 32
