= Landfall 48 =

Sailboat class

Development
- Designer: C&C Design
- Location: Canada
- Year: 1980
- No. built: 24
- Brand: Landfall
- Builder: C&C Yachts
- Role: Cruising yacht / Charter yacht
- Name: Landfall 48

Boat
- Displacement: 31,600 lb (14,334 kg)
- Draft: 6.58 ft (2.01 m)

Hull
- Type: Monohull
- Construction: Fibreglass
- LOA: 47.50 ft (14.48 m)
- LWL: 37.33 ft (11.38 m)
- Beam: 14.00 ft (4.27 m)
- Engine: Perkins Engines 4-236M 4-cylinder, 85 hp (63 kW) diesel engine

Hull appendages
- Keel: fin keel
- Ballast: 12,300 lb (5,579 kg)
- Rudder: skeg-mounted rudder

Rig
- Rig type: Cutter rig
- I foretriangle height: 56.00 ft (17.07 m)
- J foretriangle base: 19.40 ft (5.91 m)
- P mainsail luff: 48.00 ft (14.63 m)
- E mainsail foot: 17.30 ft (5.27 m)

Sails
- Sailplan: Cutter
- Mainsail area: 415.20 sq ft (38.573 m^{2})
- Jib/genoa area: 543.20 sq ft (50.465 m^{2})
- Total sail area: 960 sq ft (89 m^{2})

The Landfall 48 is a sailboat that was designed by C&C Design and first built in 1980. The Landfall series, begun with the Landfall 42, was part of a trend within C&C Yachts to develop more cruising-oriented designs under company president George Cuthbertson's direction during the later 1970s and early 1980s.

A version of the Landfall 48 design was supplied as the C&C 49, specifically for a yacht charter company, Tortola Yacht Charters.

== Production ==
The design was built by the Canadian company C&C Yachts, at their Rhode Island, United States plant. 24 examples completed during its production run between 1980 and 1982. The design is now out of production.

== Design ==
The Landfall 48 is a recreational keelboat, built predominantly of fibreglass. It has a pilot house deck arrangement, a cutter rig, a raked stem, a near vertical raised transom, a fixed fin keel, a skeg-mounted rudder controlled by a wheel in an aft open cockpit, and optionally by an inside steering station in the pilot house. It displaces 31,600 lb (14,334 kg) and carries 12,300 lb (5,579 kg) of lead ballast.

The boat has a draft of 6.58 ft (2.01 m) with the standard keel fitted. The design is fitted with a British Perkins Engines diesel engine of 85 hp (63 kW). The fuel tank holds 140 U.S. gallons (530 L; 120 imp gal) and the fresh water tank has a capacity of 300 U.S. gallons (1,100 L; 250 imp gal).

The design has a hull speed of 8.19 kn (15.17 km/h).

=== Accommodations ===
The pilot house is the main saloon and provides a large dinette and a settee lounge which converts to a 36 in (91 cm) pilot berth. To provide plenty of natural light in the pilothouse, there are large, slightly tinted windows that provide panoramic visibility. Teak joiner work highlights cabinetry, while an effort was made to keep large surfaces light. A wet locker is placed at the foot of the companionway ladder.

Down a step from the main saloon, the after cabin is positioned under the bridge deck and cockpit where the boat's motion in a seaway is least noticeable. A double berth, private shower and a writing desk are standard but a second berth to starboard could be installed in place of the desk as an option.

Down a step and going forward, the galley is to starboard with 9 feet (2.7 metres) of counter space, a three-burner propane stove, double stainless sinks and refrigeration as standard equipment. Across from the galley is a second dinette, intended as an everyday eating area though in place of the dinette, a double stateroom could be built in as an option.

The private forward cabin is fitted with either a double Pullman berth or 'V' berth, and has a hanging locker and built-in bureau to starboard and additional lockers to port to provide storage for long-term cruising.

Heads fore and aft, the forward with a separate shower stall, the aft with a separate bathtub/shower compartment. Opposite the forward head is a laundry with washer and dryer as standard.

Distributed throughout the boat there are four dorade boxes with cowl vents, four small vent hatches, five large deck hatches, and ten opening ports, providing multiple sources of cross-ventilation.

== Operational history ==
Six of the first production models went into charter service in the British Virgin Islands with Tortola Yacht Service.

== See also ==
- List of sailing boat types
