= C&C 26 =

Sailboat class

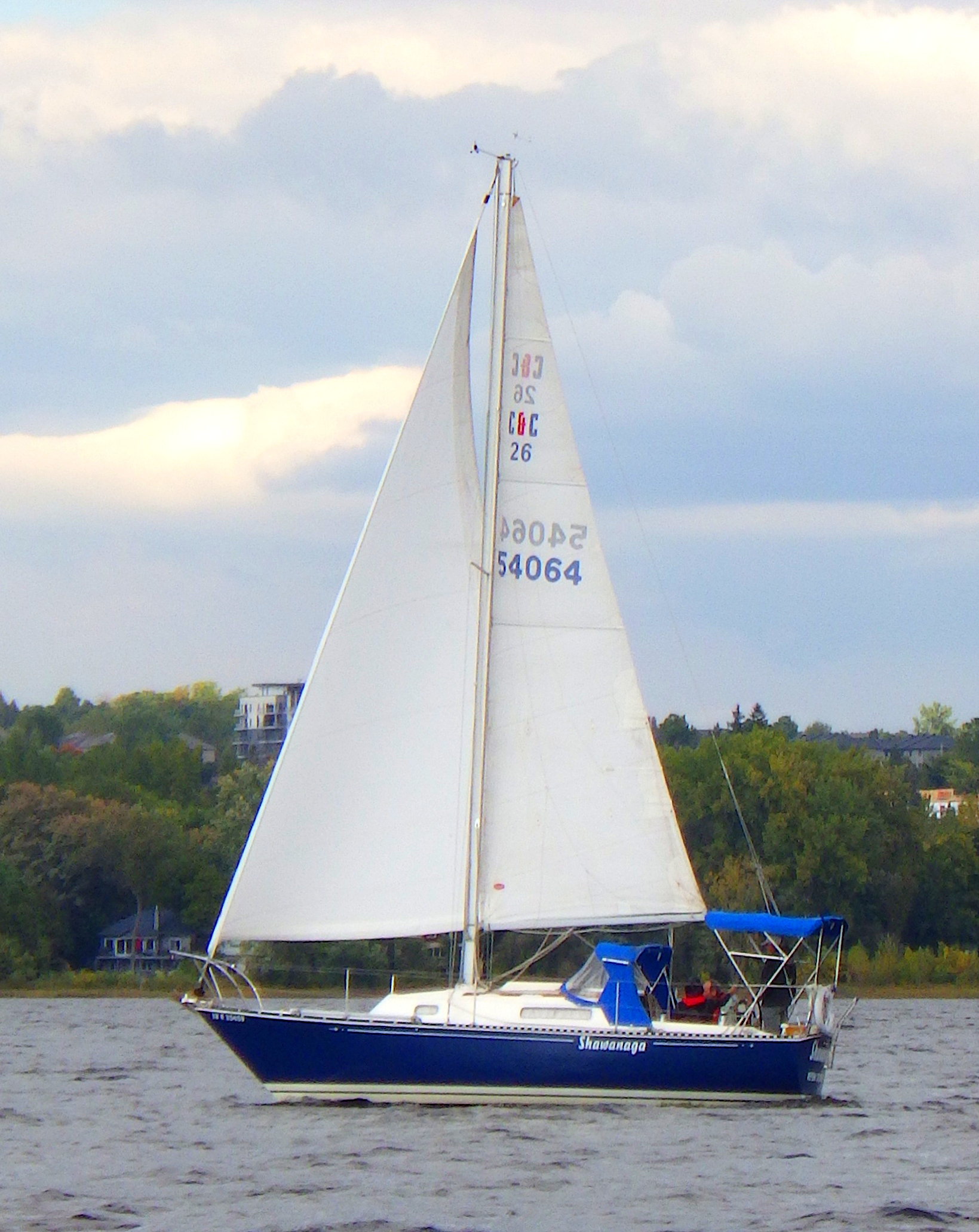

Development
- Designer: C&C Design
- Location: Canada
- Year: 1976
- Builder: C&C Yachts
- Name: C&C 26

Boat
- Displacement: 5,400 lb (2,449 kg)
- Draft: 4.60 ft (1.40 m)

Hull
- Type: Monohull
- Construction: Fiberglass
- LOA: 25.58 ft (7.80 m)
- LWL: 23.58 ft (7.19 m)
- Beam: 10.42 ft (3.18 m)
- Engine: Inboard motor

Hull appendages
- Keel: fin keel
- Ballast: 2,040 lb (925 kg)
- Rudder: internally-mounted spade-type rudder

Rig
- General: Masthead sloop
- I foretriangle height: 34.50 ft (10.52 m)
- J foretriangle base: 11.16 ft (3.40 m)
- P mainsail luff: 29.25 ft (8.92 m)
- E mainsail foot: 9.50 ft (2.90 m)

Sails
- Mainsail area: 138.94 sq ft (12.908 m^{2})
- Jib/genoa area: 192.51 sq ft (17.885 m^{2})
- Total sail area: 331.45 sq ft (30.793 m^{2})

The C&C 26 is a Canadian sailboat, that was designed by C&C Design and first built in 1976. The C&C 26 design was developed into the C&C 26 Encounter in 1978.

The C&C 26 Wave is a similarly named boat, but is actually a development of the C&C 27 Mark V.

== Production ==
The boat was built by C&C Yachts in Canada, starting in 1976, but it is now out of production.

== Design ==
The C&C 26 is a small recreational keelboat, built predominantly of fiberglass, with wood trim. It has a masthead sloop rig, an internally-mounted spade-type rudder and a fixed fin keel. The boat is fitted with an inboard engine.

== Variants ==
C&C 26
This model was introduced in 1976. It has a length overall of 25.58 ft (7.8 m), a waterline length of 23.58 ft (7.2 m), displaces 5,400 lb (2,449 kg) and carries 2,040 lb (925 kg) of ballast. The boat has a draft of 4.60 ft (1.40 m) with the standard keel fitted. The boat has a hull speed of 6.51 kn (12.06 km/h).
C&C 26 Encounter
This model was derived from the C&C 26, with a shorter rig and more displacement. It was introduced in 1978. It has a length overall of 26.00 ft (7.9 m), a waterline length of 23.00 ft (7.0 m), displaces 6,120 lb (2,776 kg). The boat has a draft of 3.92 ft (1.19 m) with the standard keel fitted. The design has a PHRF racing average handicap of 216 with a high of 213 and low of 222. It has a hull speed of 6.43 kn (11.91 km/h).

== See also ==
- List of sailing boat types
