= C&C 115 =

Sailboat class

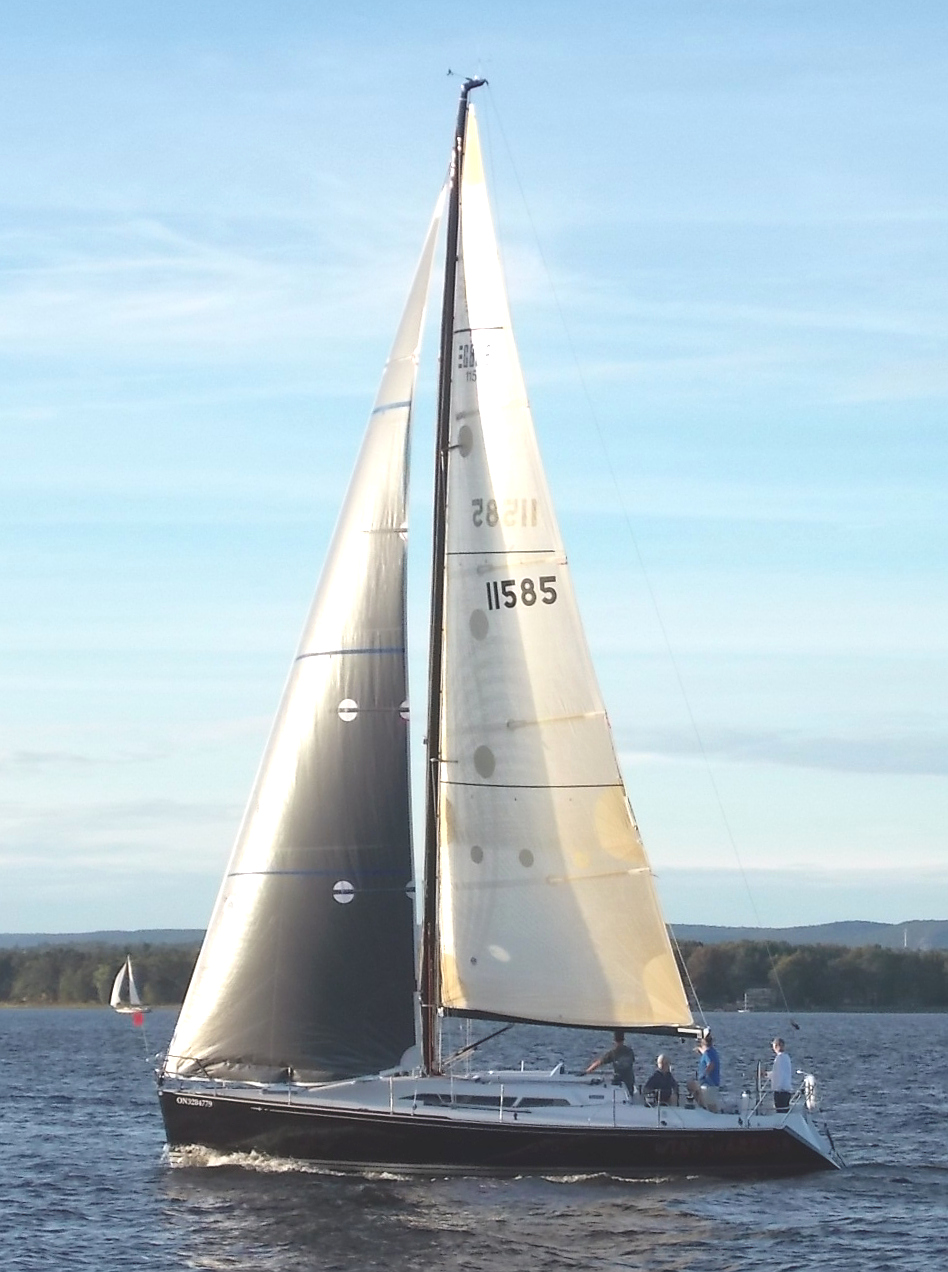

Development
- Designer: Tim Jackett
- Location: United States
- Year: 2005
- Builder: C&C Yachts
- Name: C&C 115

Boat
- Displacement: 11,800 lb (5,352 kg)
- Draft: 6.67 ft (2.03 m)

Hull
- Type: Monohull
- Construction: Fiberglass
- LOA: 37.75 ft (11.51 m)
- LWL: 33.00 ft (10.06 m)
- Beam: 11.92 ft (3.63 m)
- Engine: 28 hp (21 kW)

Hull appendages
- Keel: fin keel
- Ballast: 4,200 lb (1,905 kg)
- Rudder: internally-mounted spade-type rudder

Rig
- General: Fractional rigged sloop
- I foretriangle height: 52.16 ft (15.90 m)
- J foretriangle base: 14.50 ft (4.42 m)
- P mainsail luff: 49.33 ft (15.04 m)
- E mainsail foot: 16.33 ft (4.98 m)

Sails
- Mainsail area: 402.78 sq ft (37.419 m^{2})
- Jib/genoa area: 378.16 sq ft (35.132 m^{2})
- Total sail area: 780.94 sq ft (72.552 m^{2})

Racing
- PHRF: 66 (average)

The C&C 115 is an American sailboat, that was designed by Tim Jackett and first built in 2005. Its designation indicates its metric length overall in decimeters.

== Production ==
The boat was built by C&C Yachts in the United States, starting in 2005. It is now out of production.

== Design ==
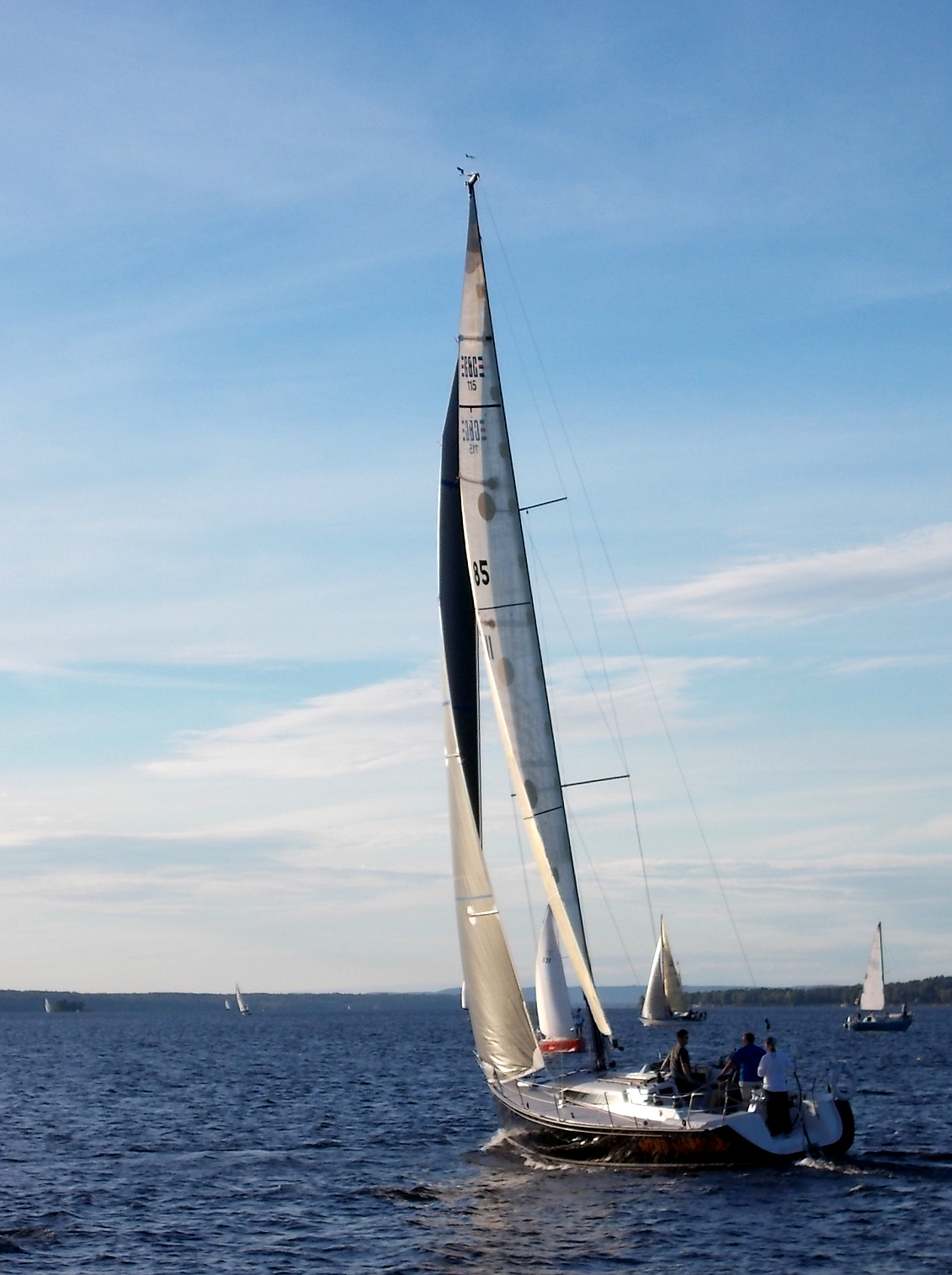
C&C 115

The C&C 115 is a small recreational keelboat, built predominantly of fiberglass. It has a fractional sloop rig, an internally-mounted spade-type rudder and a fixed fin keel. It displaces 11,800 lb (5,352 kg) and carries 4,200 lb (1,905 kg) of lead ballast.

The boat has a draft of 6.67 ft (2.03 m) with the standard fin keel.

The boat is fitted with a Japanese Yanmar or Volvo Penta diesel engine of 28 hp (21 kW). The fuel tank holds 26 U.S. gallons (98 L; 22 imp gal) and the fresh water tank has a capacity of 70 U.S. gallons (260 L; 58 imp gal).

The boat has a PHRF racing average handicap of 66 with a high of 85 and low of 57. It has a hull speed of 7.7 kn (14.26 km/h).

== See also ==
- List of sailing boat types
