= C&C 53 =

Sailboat class

Development
- Designer: Cuthbertson & Cassian
- Location: Canada
- Year: 1976
- Builder: C&C Yachts
- Name: C&C 53

Boat
- Displacement: 41,312 lb (18,739 kg)
- Draft: 8.00 ft (2.44 m)

Hull
- Type: Monohull
- Construction: Fibreglass
- LOA: 53.00 ft (16.15 m)
- LWL: 39.00 ft (11.89 m)
- Beam: 14.00 ft (4.27 m)
- Engine: Perkins Engines 4-107 50 hp (37 kW) diesel engine

Hull appendages
- Keel: swept fin keel
- Rudder: internally-mounted spade-type rudder

Rig
- Rig type: Bermuda rig

Sails
- Sailplan: Masthead sloop
- Total sail area: 1,345 sq ft (125.0 m^{2})

The C&C 53 is a Canadian sailboat, that was designed by Cuthbertson & Cassian (C&C Design) and first built in 1976.

== Production ==
The design was built by Bruckmann Manufacturing, the custom division of C&C Yachts, in Canada. Only a single example was built by Bruckmann, on a male mold. The sole example completed was named Inferno.

== Design ==
The C&C 53 is a recreational keelboat, built predominantly of fibreglass with balsawood cores. It has a masthead sloop rig, a raked stem, a raised reverse transom, an internally-mounted scimitar-shaped, spade-type rudder controlled by a wheel and a highly swept, fixed fin keel. It displaces 41,312 lb (18,739 kg).

The boat has a draft of 8.00 ft (2.44 m) with the standard keel installed. The design is fitted with a British Perkins Engines 4-107 diesel engine of 50 hp (37 kW) for docking and maneuvering.

The design has a hull speed of 8.37 kn (15.50 km/h).

== See also ==
- List of sailing boat types
