= C&C 121 =

Sailboat class

Development
- Designer: Tim Jackett
- Location: United States
- Year: 1999
- Builder: C&C Yachts
- Name: C&C 121

Boat
- Displacement: 14,600 lb (6,622 kg)
- Draft: 6.50 ft (1.98 m)

Hull
- Type: Monohull
- Construction: Vinylester-corecell and E-glass with Kevlar
- LOA: 40.00 ft (12.19 m)
- LWL: 35.50 ft (10.82 m)
- Beam: 13.08 ft (3.99 m)
- Engine: Volvo MD 2040 diesel engine

Hull appendages
- Keel: fin keel
- Ballast: 6,000 lb (2,722 kg)
- Rudder: internally-mounted spade-type rudder

Rig
- General: Masthead rigged sloop
- I foretriangle height: 57.00 ft (17.37 m)
- J foretriangle base: 15.00 ft (4.57 m)
- P mainsail luff: 51.00 ft (15.54 m)
- E mainsail foot: 16.33 ft (4.98 m)

Sails
- Mainsail area: 416.42 sq ft (38.687 m^{2})
- Jib/genoa area: 427.50 sq ft (39.716 m^{2})
- Total sail area: 843.92 sq ft (78.403 m^{2})

Racing
- PHRF: 63 (average)

The C&C 121, originally called the 121 Express at introduction, is an American sailboat, that was designed by Tim Jackett and entered production in 1999.

== Production ==
The boat was built by C&C Yachts in the United States, but it is now out of production.

== Design ==
The C&C 121 is a small recreational keelboat, built predominantly with a vinylester-corecell and E-glass with Kevlar. It has a masthead sloop rig, an internally-mounted spade-type rudder and a fixed fin keel. It displaces 14,600 lb (6,622 kg).

The design had a choice of keels. There was an option of a standard keel with a draft of 6.50 ft (1.98 m) and 6,000 lb (2,722 kg) of lead ballast, a shallow draft keel with a draft of 6.00 ft (1.83 m) and 6,200 lb (2,812 kg) of lead ballast and a deep keel with a draft of 8.00 ft (2.44 m) and 5,500 lb (2,495 kg) of lead ballast.

The boat is fitted with a Volvo MD 2040 diesel inboard engine. Its fuel tank holds 35 U.S. gallons (130 L; 29 imp gal) and the fresh water tank has a capacity of 80 U.S. gallons (300 L; 67 imp gal).

The boat has a PHRF racing average handicap of 63 with a high of 69 and low of 54. It has a hull speed of 7.98 kn (14.78 km/h).

== See also ==
- List of sailing boat types
