= C&C 46 =

Sailboat class

Development
- Designer: C&C Design
- Location: Canada
- Year: 1973
- Builder: C&C Yachts
- Name: C&C 46

Boat
- Displacement: 26,700 lb (12,111 kg)
- Draft: 7.50 ft (2.29 m)

Hull
- Type: Monohull
- Construction: Fibreglass
- LOA: 45.58 ft (13.89 m)
- LWL: 38.83 ft (11.84 m)
- Beam: 13.00 ft (3.96 m)
- Engine: Inboard motor

Hull appendages
- Keel: fin keel
- Rudder: internally-mounted spade-type rudder

Rig
- Rig type: Bermuda rig
- I foretriangle height: 58.50 ft (17.83 m)
- J foretriangle base: 19.50 ft (5.94 m)
- P mainsail luff: 51.50 ft (15.70 m)
- E mainsail foot: 14.30 ft (4.36 m)

Sails
- Sailplan: Masthead sloop
- Mainsail area: 368.23 sq ft (34.210 m^{2})
- Jib/genoa area: 570.38 sq ft (52.990 m^{2})
- Total sail area: 938.60 sq ft (87.199 m^{2})

Racing
- PHRF: 66 (average)

The C&C 46 is a Canadian sailboat, that was designed by C&C Design and first built in 1973.

== Production ==
The design was built by C&C Yachts in Canada, but it is now out of production.

== Design ==
The C&C 46 is a small recreational keelboat, built predominantly of fibreglass, with wood trim. It has a masthead sloop rig, an internally-mounted spade-type rudder controlled by a wheel and a fixed fin keel with lead ballast. It displaces 26,700 lb (12,111 kg).

The boat has a draft of 7.50 ft (2.29 m) with the standard keel fitted and mounts an inboard diesel engine.

The design has a PHRF racing average handicap of 66 and a hull speed of 8.35 kn (15.46 km/h).

== See also ==
- List of sailing boat types
