= C&C 51 Custom =

Sailboat class

Development
- Designer: Robert W. Ball
- Location: Canada
- Year: 1986
- No. built: at least five
- Builder: C&C Yachts
- Name: C&C 51 Custom

Boat
- Displacement: 33,800 lb (15,331 kg)
- Draft: 9.92 ft (3.02 m) with centreboard down
- Air draft: 71.3 ft (21.7 m); 71.6 ft (21.8 m) XL

Hull
- Type: Monohull
- Construction: Fibreglass
- LOA: 51.75 ft (15.77 m)
- LWL: 43.92 ft (13.39 m)
- Beam: 13.58 ft (4.14 m)
- Engine: Inboard motor

Hull appendages
- Keel: stub fin keel with centreboard
- Ballast: 13,800 lb (6,260 kg)
- Rudder: internally-mounted spade-type rudder

Rig
- Rig type: Bermuda rig
- I foretriangle height: 67 ft (20 m) XL
- J foretriangle base: 20.6 ft (6.3 m) XL
- P mainsail luff: 61.4 ft (18.7 m) XL
- E mainsail foot: 20.5 ft (6.2 m) XL

Sails
- Sailplan: masthead sloop
- Total sail area: 1,312 sq ft (121.9 m^{2})

The C&C 51 Custom is a Canadian sailboat, that was designed by Robert W. Ball and first built in 1986.

== Production ==
The design was built by C&C Yachts in Canada, but it is now out of production.

At least 5 examples were produced (based on Hull Identification Numbers (HIN) in the US Coast Guard database), while three more were under construction when the C&C factory in Niagara-on-the-Lake was destroyed by fire in 1994. The last example, Silent Partner II, was finished from a hull produced by C&C and spared by the fire, with the finishing work completed at the Wiggers Yard in Ontario, Canada, and was launched in 1997.

== Design ==
The C&C 51 Custom is a small recreational keelboat, built predominantly of fibreglass, with wood trim. It has a masthead sloop rig, a raked stem, a reverse transom, an internally-mounted spade-type rudder controlled by a wheel and a fixed stub fin keel with a retractable centreboard. It displaces 33,800 lb (15,331 kg) and carries 13,800 lb (6,260 kg) of ballast. It carries a sail area of 1,312 sq ft (121.9 m^{2}) and has an air draft (overall height) of 71.3 ft (21.7 m).

The C&C 51 was designed as a centerboarder from the start. The centreboard is filled with lead ballast and has a hydraulic lift with a tackle arrangement in which the hydraulic cylinder moves about one quarter the distance needed to pull up the board. As a result, the boat has a draft of 9.92 ft (3.02 m) with the centreboard extended and 5.92 ft (1.80 m) with it retracted, allowing operation in shallow moorings. One example, Silent Partner II, was completed with a fixed keel.

The design has a hull speed of 8.88 kn (16.45 km/h).

There was a 51 XL version produced with a slightly taller mast and so a slightly larger sail area.

== See also ==
- List of sailing boat types
