= C&C 41 =

Sailboat class

Development
- Designer: Robert W. Ball
- Location: Canada
- Year: 1981
- No. built: 127
- Builder: C&C Yachts
- Name: C&C 41

Boat
- Displacement: 17,500 lb (7,938 kg)
- Draft: 7.80 ft (2.38 m)

Hull
- Type: Monohull
- Construction: Fibreglass
- LOA: 40.75 ft (12.42 m)
- LWL: 33.33 ft (10.16 m)
- Beam: 12.92 ft (3.94 m)
- Engine: Yanmar 3HM35F diesel engine

Hull appendages
- Keel: fin keel
- Ballast: 8,000 lb (3,629 kg)
- Rudder: internally-mounted spade-type rudder

Rig
- Rig type: Bermuda rig
- I foretriangle height: 56.00 ft (17.07 m)
- J foretriangle base: 16.50 ft (5.03 m)
- P mainsail luff: 50.00 ft (15.24 m)
- E mainsail foot: 14.00 ft (4.27 m)

Sails
- Sailplan: Masthead sloop
- Mainsail area: 350.00 sq ft (32.516 m^{2})
- Jib/genoa area: 462.00 sq ft (42.921 m^{2})
- Total sail area: 812.00 sq ft (75.437 m^{2})

Racing
- PHRF: 108 (average)

The C&C 41 is a Canadian sailboat, that was designed by Robert W. Ball at the request of Jim Plaxton, who had purchased C&C Yachts in 1981. Plaxton wanted an International Offshore Rule racer and the resulting design went into production in 1981.

== Design ==
The C&C 41 is a recreational keelboat, built predominantly of fibreglass, with wood trim. It has a masthead sloop rig, a raked stem, a raised reverse transom, an internally-mounted spade-type rudder controlled by a wheel and a fixed fin keel or optionally keel and centreboard. The fixed keel version displaces 17,500 lb (7,938 kg) and carries 8,000 lb (3,629 kg) of lead ballast.

The keel-equipped version of the boat has a draft of 7.80 ft (2.38 m), while the centreboard-equipped version has a draft of 8.00 ft (2.44 m) with the centreboard extended and 4.92 ft (1.50 m) with it retracted.

The boat was also produced in "GP" and "Limited Edition" models, both introduced in 1981 as well. The GP has a 1.00 ft (0.30 m) shorter mast and a displacement of 16,800 lb (7,620 kg). Length overall is the same for all models, but the waterline length varies. The C&C 41 has a waterline length of 33.33 ft (10.16 m), while the GP is 33.50 ft (10.21 m) and the Limited Edition is 33.48 ft (10.20 m).

The boat is fitted with a Japanese Yanmar 3HM35F diesel engine. The fuel tank holds 20 U.S. gallons (76 L; 17 imp gal) and the fresh water tank has a capacity of 60 U.S. gallons (230 L; 50 imp gal).

The fixed fin keel base design has a PHRF racing average handicap of 108 with a high of 111 and low of 105. It has a hull speed of 7.74 kn (14.33 km/h). The centreboard version has a PHRF racing average handicap of 81 with a high of 90 and low of 78, along with a hull speed of 7.76 kn (14.37 km/h). The GP version has a PHRF racing average handicap of 66 with a high of 66 and low of 66, with a hull speed of 7.76 kn (14.37 km/h). The limited edition has a PHRF racing average handicap of 72 with a high of 75 and low of 69, with a hull speed of 7.75 kn (14.35 km/h).

== See also ==
- List of sailing boat types
