= C&C 24 =

Sailboat class

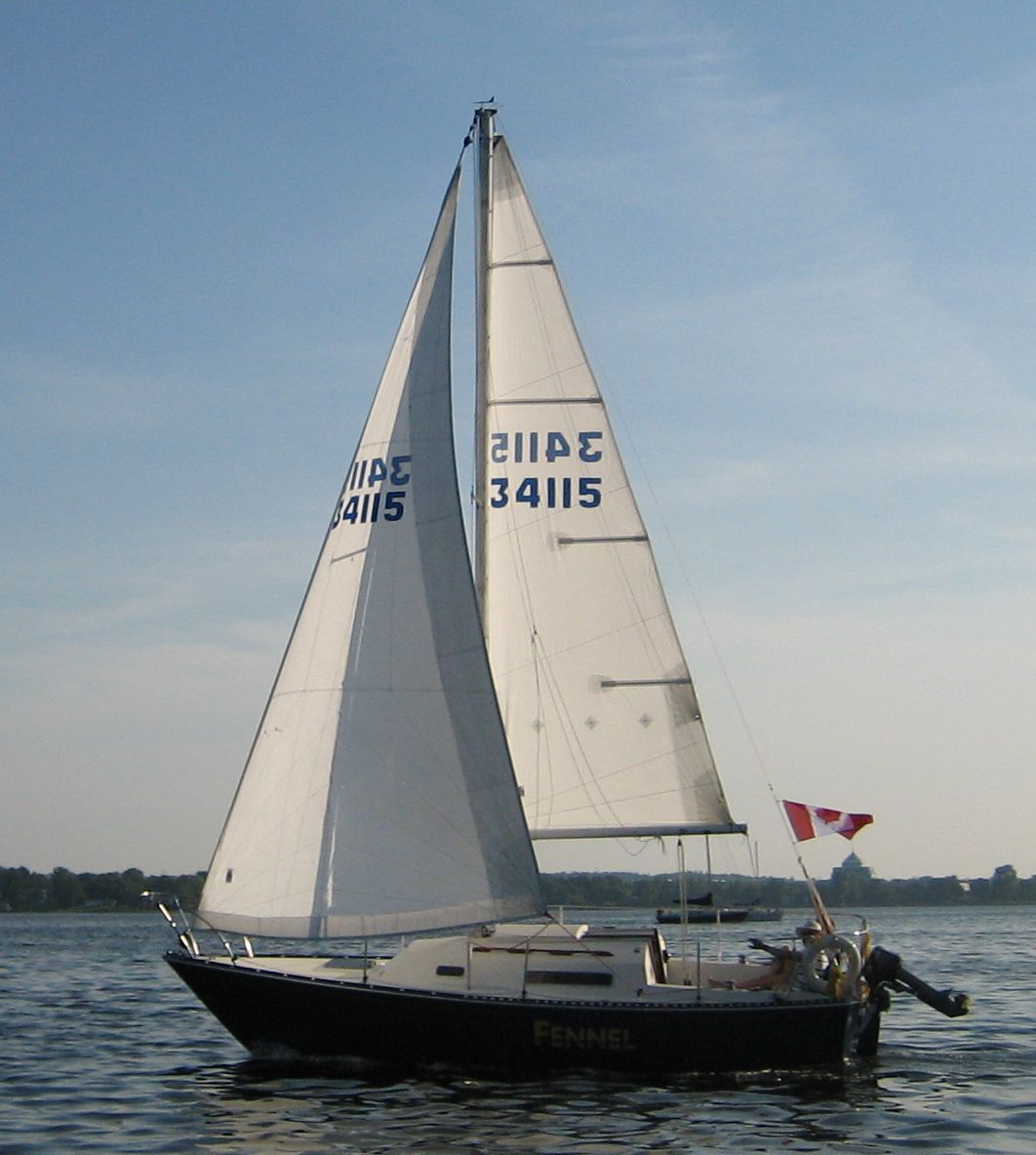
- C&C 24

Development
- Designer: C&C Design
- Location: Canada
- Year: 1975
- Builder: C&C Yachts
- Name: C&C 24

Boat
- Displacement: 3,200 lb (1,451 kg)
- Draft: 4.00 ft (1.22 m)

Hull
- Type: Monohull
- Construction: Fiberglass
- LOA: 24.00 ft (7.32 m)
- LWL: 19.50 ft (5.94 m)
- Beam: 8.76 ft (2.67 m)
- Engine: Outboard motor

Hull appendages
- Keel: fin keel
- Ballast: 1,050 lb (476 kg)
- Rudder: transom-mounted rudder

Rig
- General: Masthead sloop
- I foretriangle height: 29.00 ft (8.84 m)
- J foretriangle base: 10.50 ft (3.20 m)
- P mainsail luff: 23.50 ft (7.16 m)
- E mainsail foot: 8.50 ft (2.59 m)

Sails
- Mainsail area: 99.88 sq ft (9.279 m^{2})
- Jib/genoa area: 152.25 sq ft (14.144 m^{2})
- Total sail area: 252.13 sq ft (23.424 m^{2})

Racing
- PHRF: 228 (average)

The C&C 24 is a Canadian sailboat, that was designed by C&C Design and first built in 1975.

== Production ==
The boat was built by C&C Yachts in Canada, but it is now out of production. The design was the smallest boat ever built by the company.

== Design ==
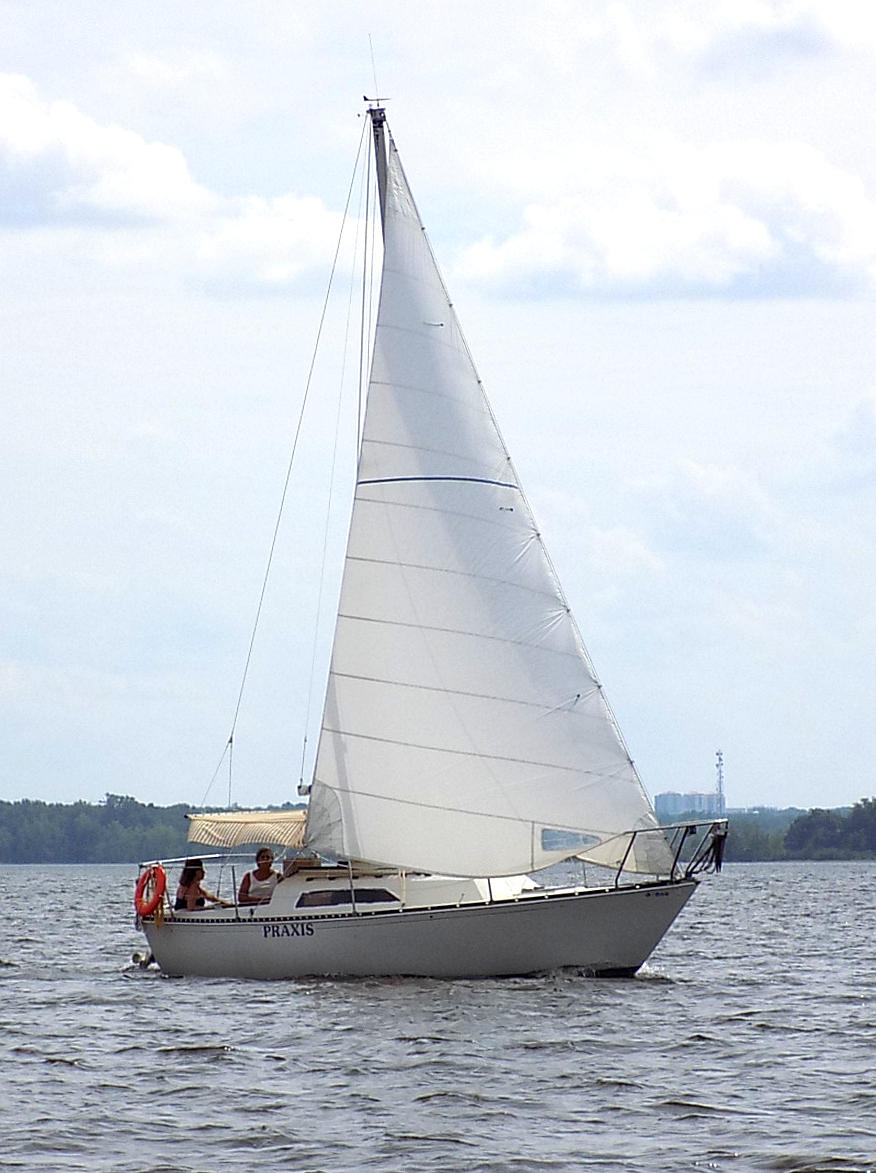
C&C 24 with alternate window configuration

The C&C 24 is a small recreational keelboat, built predominantly of fiberglass, with wood trim. It has a masthead sloop rig, a transom-hung rudder and a fixed fin keel. It displaces 3,200 lb (1,451 kg) and carries 1,050 lb (476 kg) of ballast.

The boat has a draft of 4.00 ft (1.22 m) with the standard keel fitted.

The boat has a PHRF racing average handicap of 228 with a high of 238 and low of 223. It has a hull speed of 5.92 kn (10.96 km/h).

In a review Michael McGoldrick wrote, "the C&C 24 is good looking boat with a fairly wide beam. More than with many other boats in this size category, you can "start" to get a big boat feel when standing on deck of the C&C 24. This boat has a nice wide open cabin down below, although it does not quite have full standing headroom. Some of these boats had a cabin layout where the head (toilet) located in the forward area under the v-berth (which could be made private from the rest of the cabin with a curtain). Most models had the head located under a folding contraption in the aft port corner of the main cabin."

In a 2010 review Steve Henkel wrote, "best features: Her beam helps ... lend her an extra bit of stability going to weather. Worst features: At least one owner mentioned that she tended to pound a little in choppy conditions. Two owners reported that the prop occasionally cavitated in waves. Still another owner observed that his fiancée did not like the head arrangement near the companionway in one of the early boats. The woman, complained that a mere canvas curtain did not afford enough privacy, and that caused the owner to buy a larger boat. (Engaged sailors beware!) Some say the settee berths are too narrow. Several owners mentioned difficulty in replacing foggy plastic windows, which were factory-glued to the fiberglass. In the end they persevered, using new acrylic and 3M-5200, plus throughbolts."
