= C&C 48 Custom =

Sailboat class

Development
- Designer: C&C Design
- Location: Canada
- Year: 1973
- Builder: C&C Yachts
- Name: C&C 48 Custom

Boat
- Displacement: 28,100 lb (12,746 kg)
- Draft: 7.25 ft (2.21 m)

Hull
- Type: Monohull
- Construction: Fibreglass
- LOA: 48.17 ft (14.68 m)
- LWL: 39.00 ft (11.89 m)
- Beam: 13.67 ft (4.17 m)
- Engine: Perkins 4108 50 hp (37 kW) diesel engine

Hull appendages
- Keel: fin keel
- Ballast: 12,750 lb (5,783 kg)
- Rudder: internally-mounted spade-type rudder

Rig
- Rig type: Bermuda rig
- I foretriangle height: 62.00 ft (18.90 m)
- J foretriangle base: 19.80 ft (6.04 m)
- P mainsail luff: 54.50 ft (16.61 m)
- E mainsail foot: 18.00 ft (5.49 m)

Sails
- Sailplan: Masthead sloop
- Mainsail area: 490.50 sq ft (45.569 m^{2})
- Jib/genoa area: 613.80 sq ft (57.024 m^{2})
- Total sail area: 1,104.30 sq ft (102.593 m^{2})

Racing
- PHRF: 60 (average)

The C&C 48 Custom is a Canadian sailboat, that was designed by C&C Design and first built in 1973.

== Production ==
The design was built by C&C Yachts in Canada starting in 1973. Production ended in 1976.

== Design ==
The C&C 48 Custom is a small recreational keelboat, built predominantly of fibreglass, with wood trim. It has a masthead sloop rig, a raked stem, a raised reverse transom, an internally-mounted spade-type rudder controlled by a wheel and a fixed fin keel. It displaces 28,100 lb (12,746 kg) and carries 12,750 lb (5,783 kg) of lead ballast.

The boat has a draft of 7.25 ft (2.21 m) with the standard keel fitted.

The boat is fitted with a British Perkins Engines 4108 diesel engine of 50 hp (37 kW). The fuel tank holds 50 U.S. gallons (190 L; 42 imp gal) and the fresh water tank has a capacity of 150 U.S. gallons (570 L; 120 imp gal).

The design has a PHRF racing average handicap of 60 with a high of 66 and low of 57. It has a hull speed of 8.37 kn (15.50 km/h).

== See also ==
- List of sailing boat types
