= C&C 27 Mk V =

1980s Canadian recreational keelboat

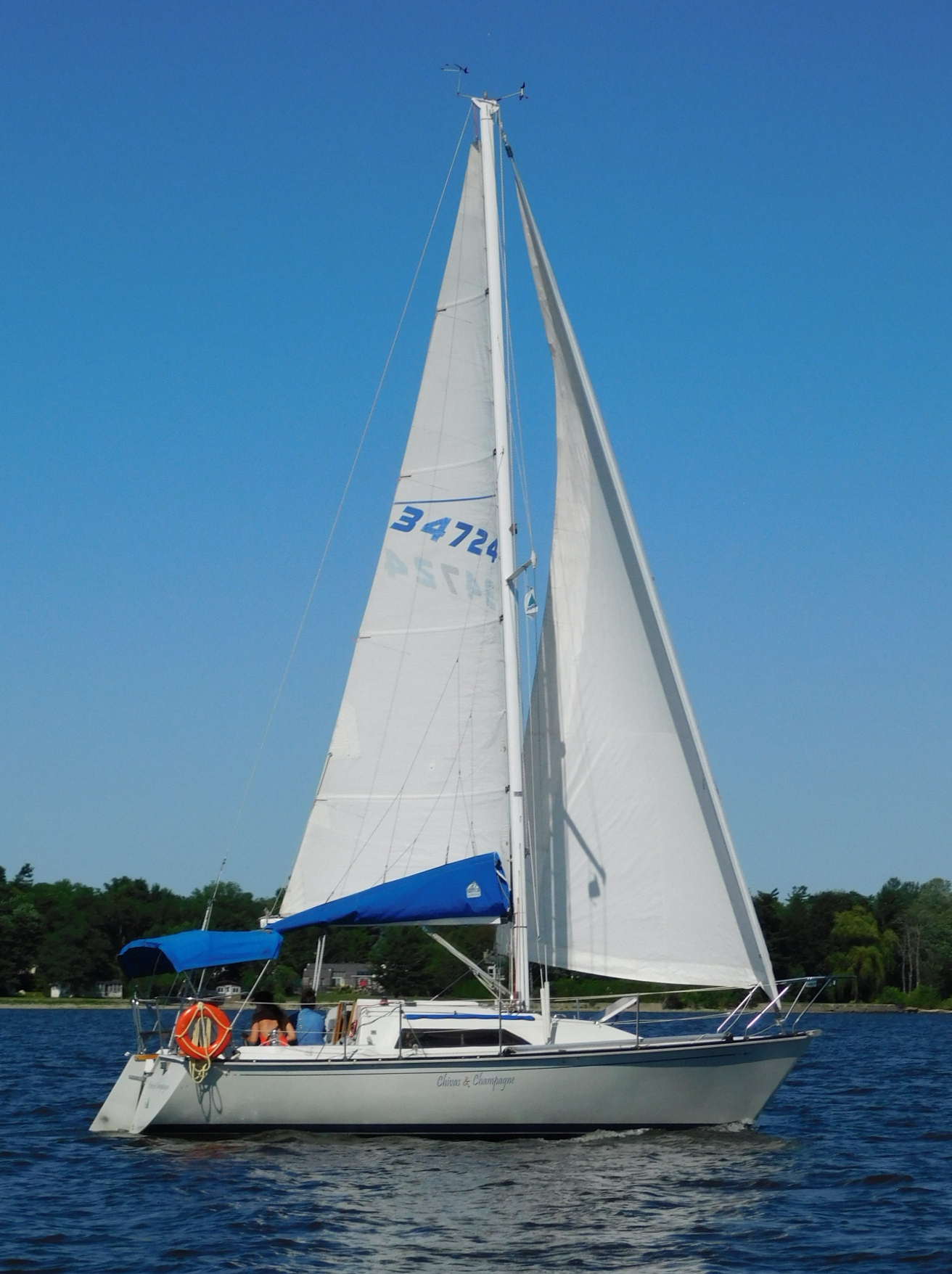

Development
- Designer: C&C Design Group
- Location: Canada
- Year: 1984
- Builder: C&C Yachts
- Name: C&C 27 Mk V

Boat
- Displacement: 4,420 lb (2,005 kg) / 5,080 lb (2,304 kg)
- Draft: 4.8 ft (1.5 m) / 3.5 ft (1.1 m)

Hull
- Type: Monohull
- Construction: Fibreglass
- LOA: 26.5 ft (8.1 m)
- LWL: 23.00 ft (7.01 m)
- Beam: 9.25 ft (2.82 m)
- Engine: Yanmar 1GMF diesel engine 7.5 hp (6 kW)

Hull appendages
- Keel: fin keel
- Ballast: 1,715 lb (778 kg) / 2,075 lb (941 kg)
- Rudder: transom-mounted rudder

Rig
- General: Masthead sloop
- I foretriangle height: 35.50 ft (10.82 m)
- J foretriangle base: 10.08 ft (3.07 m)
- P mainsail luff: 30.50 ft (9.30 m)
- E mainsail foot: 10.75 ft (3.28 m)

Sails
- Mainsail area: 163.94 sq ft (15.231 m^{2})
- Jib/genoa area: 178.92 sq ft (16.622 m^{2})
- Total sail area: 342.8 sq ft (31.85 m^{2})

Racing
- PHRF: 174 with spinnaker

The C&C 27 Mk V is a recreational keelboat built by C&C Yachts. It was a new design, originally marketed as the "new C&C 27", but is now usually referred to as the Mark V to differentiate it from the earlier C&C 27.

More than 300 were built from 1984 to 1987, both in Niagara-On-The-Lake, Canada and in C&C's plant in the United States.

Designed by the C&C Design Group led by Neil Gilbert, the Mark V was introduced to refresh the 1970s styling of the earlier C&C 27 series and also to improve the manufacturing profitability of the boat. The previous C&C 27 series cost as much to build as the larger C&C boats, but commanded a lower retail price.

It has a solid fibreglass hull and a fixed keel, available in standard fin and shoal draft. The design features a raked stem, a revers transom and a transom-hung rudder controlled by a tiller. The fin keel version displaces 4,420 lb (2,005 kg) and carries 1,715 lb (778 kg) of lead ballast with a draft of 4.83 ft (1.47 m). The shoal draft keel version displaces 5,080 lb (2,304 kg) with 2,075 lb (941 kg) of ballast and 3.5 ft (1.1 m) of draft.

It has a masthead rig with a tall, single-spreader deck-stepped mast. It has a PHRF racing average handicap of 174 with a spinnaker and 192 without.

The cockpit has benches over 6 feet long, and cabin headroom is 70 inches.

== Gallery ==
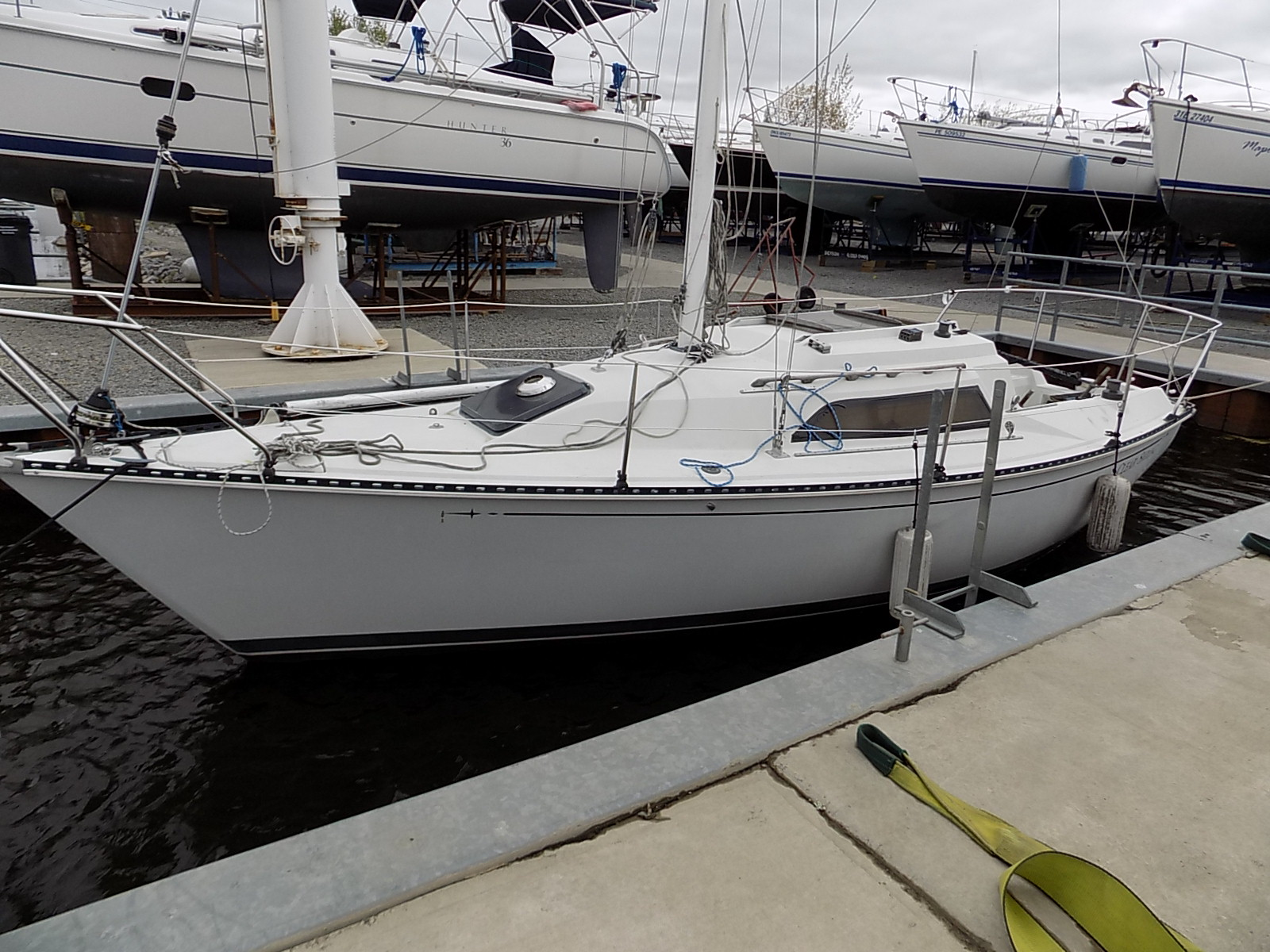
C&C 27 Mk V

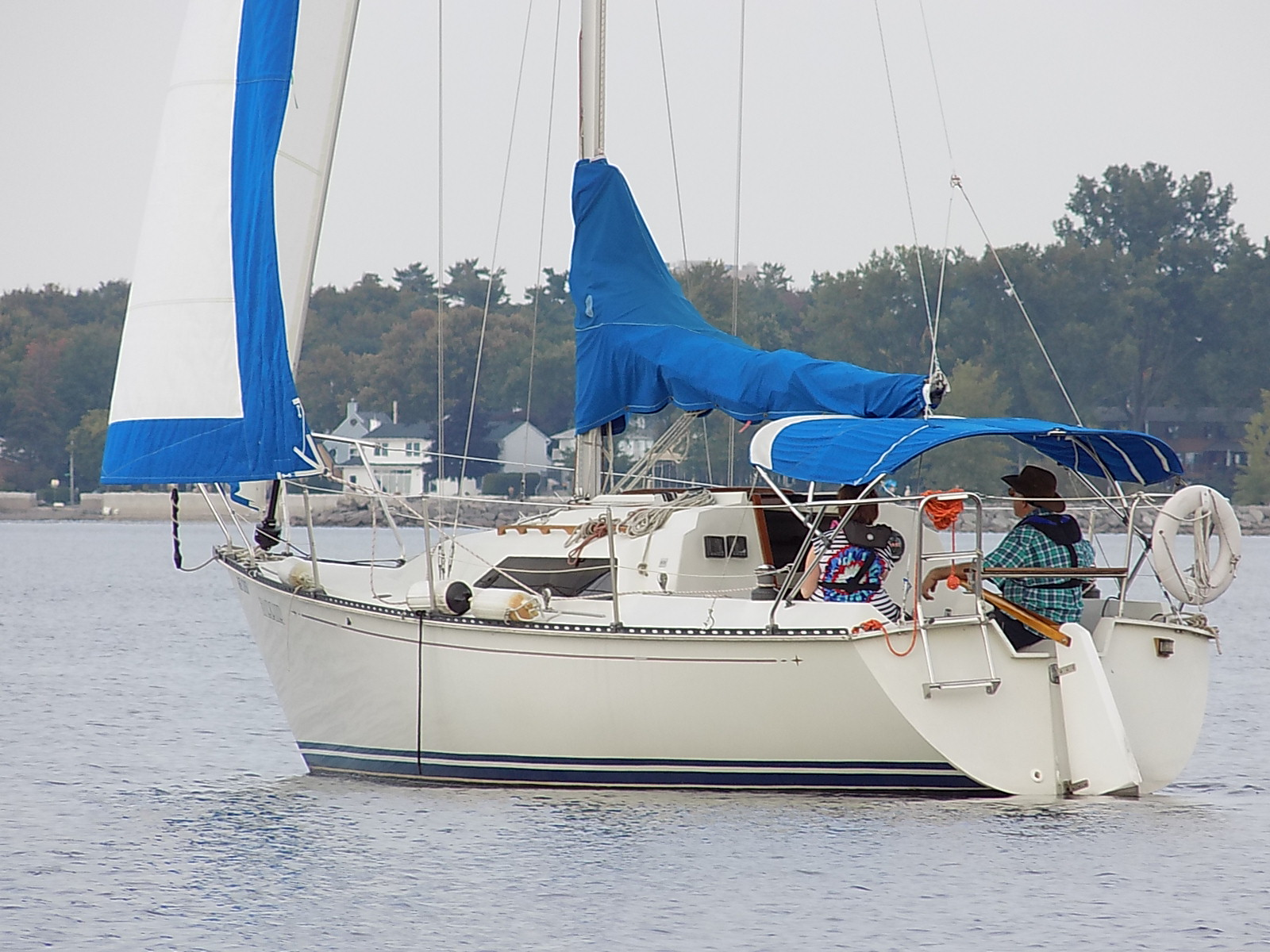
C&C 27 Mk V stern view, showing the transom-mounted rudder

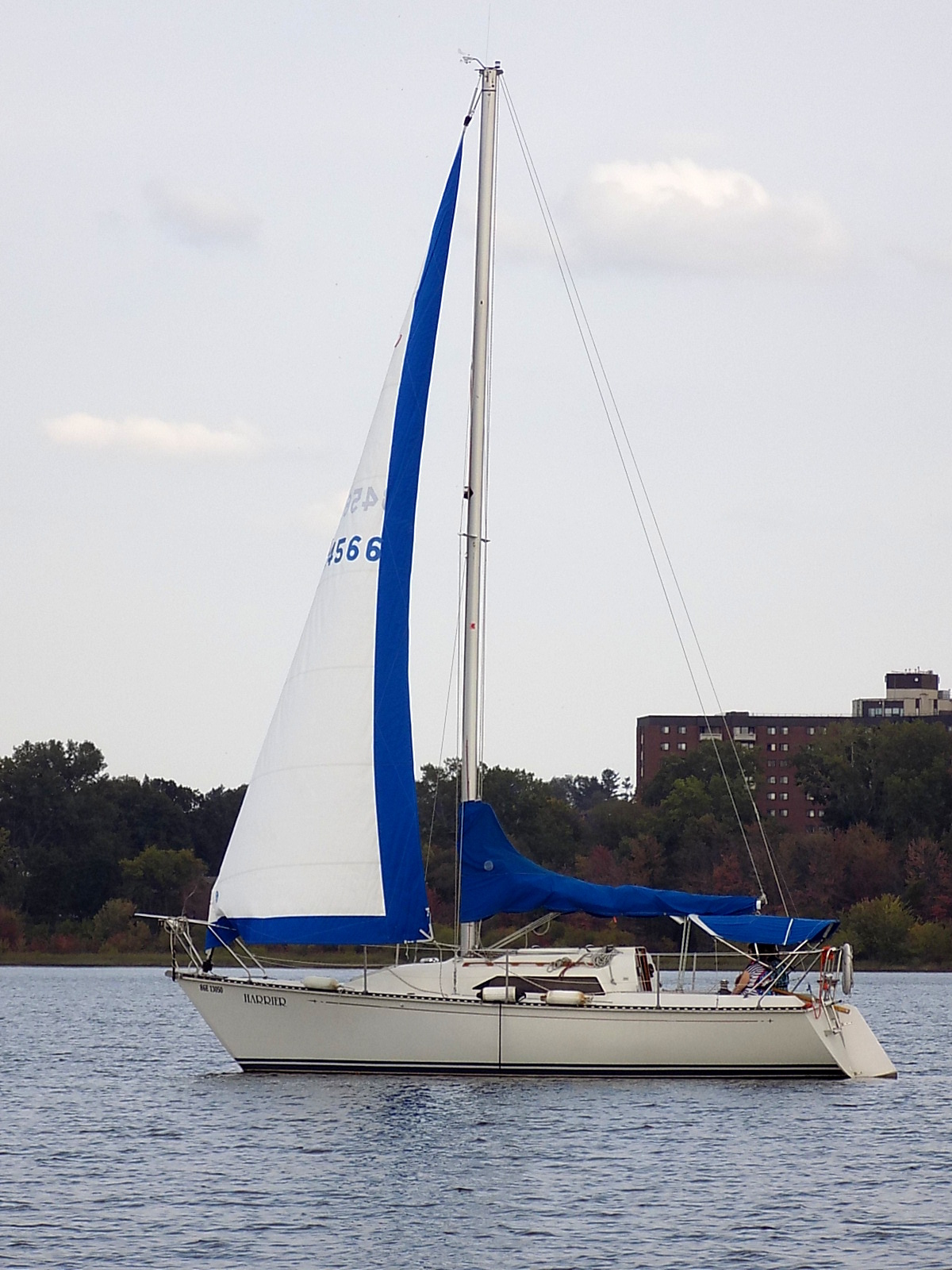
C&C 27 Mk V sailing under genoa only
