= C&C Yachts =

Sailboat manufacturer

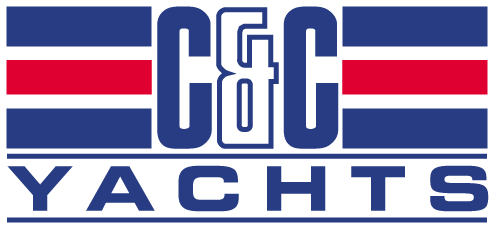
- Company type: Publicly owned holding company, later a privately held company
- Industry: Boat building
- Predecessor: Cuthbertson & Cassian Design, Hinterhoeller Ltd., Belleville Marine Yard Ltd., Bruckmann Manufacturing Ltd.
- Founded: 1969
- Founder: Erich Bruckmann, George Cassian, George Cuthbertson, George Hinterhoeller, Ian Morch
- Defunct: 2017
- Headquarters: Canada and United States
- Key people: Robert W. Ball, Erich Bruckmann, George Cassian, George Cuthbertson, George Hinterhoeller, Ian Morch, later Tim Jackett
- Products: Yachts

C&C Yachts was a builder of high-performance fiberglass monohull sailboats with production facilities in Canada, Germany, and the United States. C&C designed and constructed a full range of production line cruiser-racer boats, as well as custom one-off and short production run racing and cruising boats. C&C boats ranged in size from as small as 21 ft (6.4 m) to as large as 67 ft (20.4 m). C&C also produced a line of bluewater cruising boats in the 35 ft (10.7 m) to 48 ft (14.6 m) range under its Landfall brand. In addition, C&C designed sailboats for production by a number of other manufacturers such as CS Yachts, Mirage Yachts, Northern Yachts, Ontario Yachts, Paceship Yachts, and Tanzer Industries.

C&C was founded in 1969 as a public company in Canada, which resulted from a joint venture among several companies and design teams. At the peak of its market success, the company supplied 50% of the Canadian market and 20% of the US market.

The company name, C&C Yachts, came from the names of two of the founding designers, George Cuthbertson and George Cassian.

== History ==
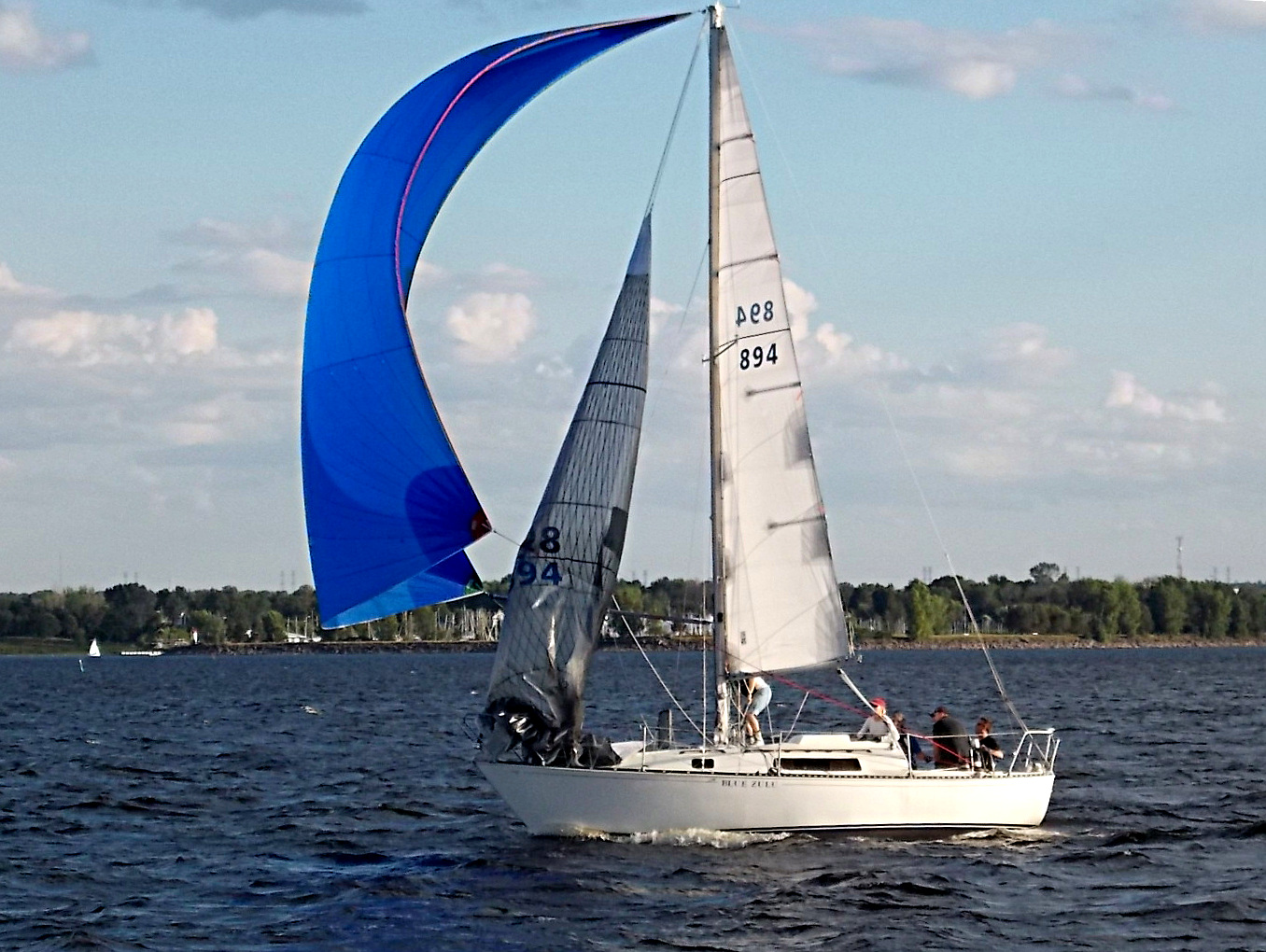
C&C 27 Mark 3

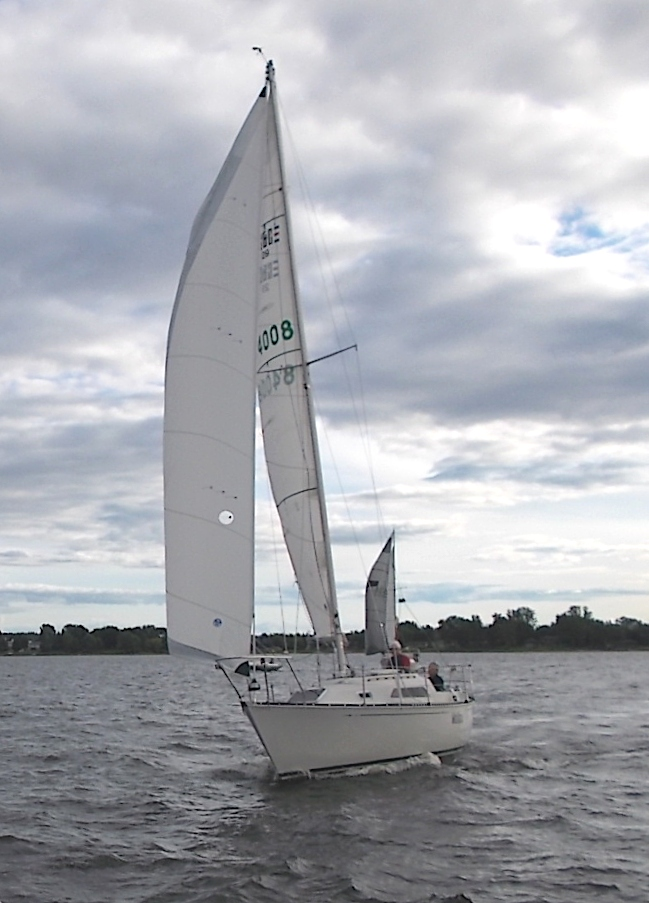
C&C 29

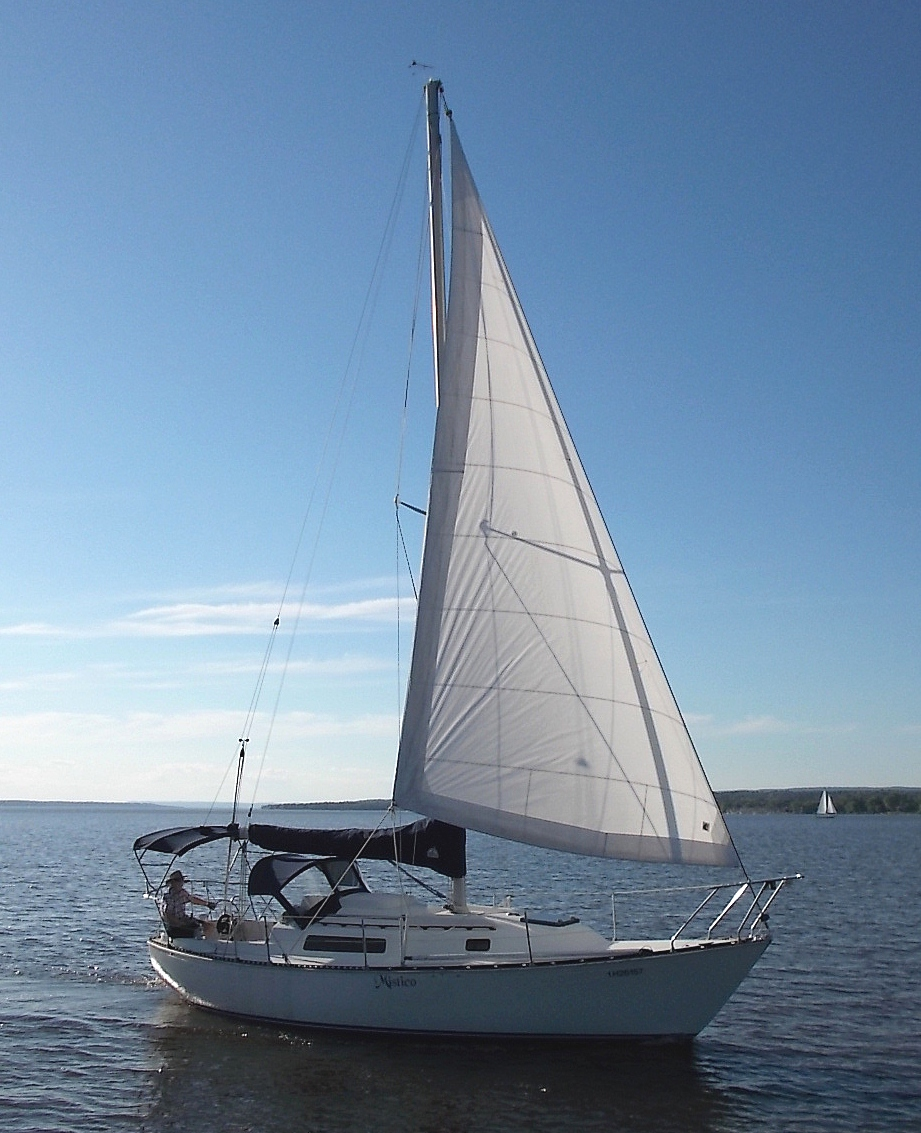
C&C 30 Mk 1

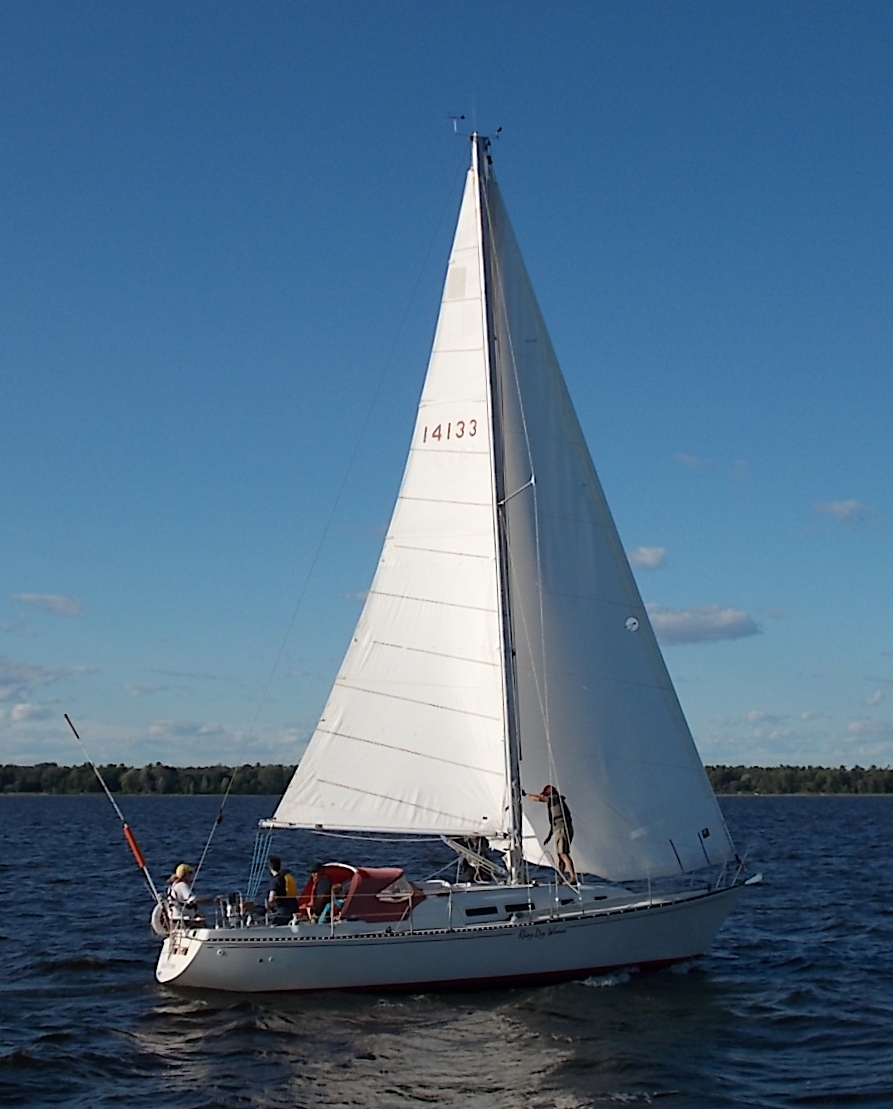
C&C 35 Mk 1

=== Origin ===
Two Canadian sailors; George Cuthbertson, a mechanical engineer, and George Cassian, an aircraft designer, then unemployed following the demise of the Avro Arrow jet project, formed the Cuthbertson and Cassian design group in 1961. This partnership evolved out of Cuthbertson's previous yacht brokerage and design firm. Inishfree, the 54 ft (16.5 m) racing yacht built 1958, was Cuthbertson's first design of consequence. Cuthbertson initially held 75% interest in the company and later increased Cassian's share to a third. They started by designing a small number of steel and wooden boats, with Cuthbertson doing the preliminary lines and calculations and Cassian the interior plans and details.

After successful design of the Hinterhoeller Invader 36, in 1965 Canadian Perry Connolly (who had previously purchased an Invader 36) commissioned Cuthbertson and Cassian to design a custom 40-foot (12m) racing sloop. At a discussion between periods at a Toronto Maple Leafs game in Maple Leaf Gardens Connolly requested "the meanest, hungriest 40-footer afloat". The boat, named Red Jacket, was built by Bruckmann Manufacturing of balsa wood sandwiched between two layers of fibreglass. The resulting structure was strong, stiff and significantly lighter than the wood or solid fiberglass yachts then sailing. Red Jacket is considered to be the first sailboat engineered with a cored hull (the practice is common in yacht-building and aerospace, even in the manufacture of wind-turbine blades today). She was launched in May 1966 and won 11 of 13 starts that summer. That winter, Red Jacket headed south and won a number of races on the famed Southern Ocean Racing Conference (SORC), competing against more than 85 of the best racers of the day. Connolly went back the next year, and Red Jacket was, in 1968, the first Canadian boat to win the SORC. The sailing community at large paid attention and demand for the C&C designs in production skyrocketed.

C&C joined forces with their builders and suppliers: Belleville Marine yacht builder Ian Morch, George Hinterhoeller of Hinterhoeller Yachts and custom builder Erich Bruckmann. Together they formed a holding company, C&C Yachts Limited, officially formed on September 26, 1969., which was traded on the Toronto Stock Exchange with the help of an IPO by Walwyn, Stodgell & Co., an issue of 350,000 common shares at $4.50, providing the fledgling company with working capital of $1.5 million. The company started the mass production of fiberglass sailboats, a relatively new industry at that time. The sale of stock enabled C&C to build inventory in the off-season, which would then be delivered to dealers in the spring and early summer. It allowed efficiencies which were otherwise impossible.

Owing to his degrees in engineering from the University of Toronto, and business administration from the University of Southern California, Ian Morch was made president. George Cuthbertson directed the design effort, Erich Bruckmann the custom work, and George Hinterhoeller managed production. The plant at Niagara-on-the-Lake was "a completely integrated operation" aside from lead keel casting. The plant contained a rigging shop, a metal shop, a wood shop, a fiberglass shop, a upholstery shop, and an assembly area. In the operation conceived by Hinterhoeller, the yachts were built in pits, as opposed to the traditional use of ladders to mount the erected hull and keel.

In 1969 the customs tariff to import yachts from the US into Canada was 17.5% and C&C achieved sales of $3.9 million its first year.

=== Expansion ===
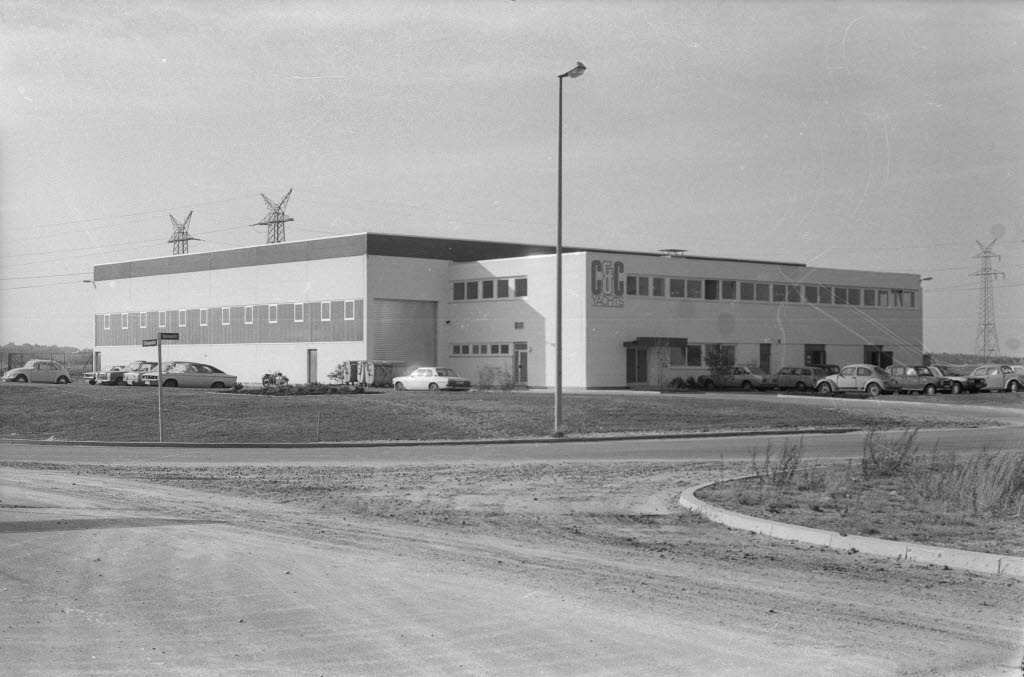
One of the C&C Yachts expansion facilities, this one in Kiel, Germany

C&C's reputation was based on its racing successes. The year of the merger brought a challenge for the Canada's Cup, a match-race between Canada and the US. C&C's custom shop, Bruckmann Manufacturing of Oakville, Ontario, built the three Canadian defenders, Manitou, Bagatelle and True North, of which, Manitou, beat the Sparkman and Stephens-designed Niagara. In 1971 hull #1 of the 43 ft (13.1 m) "Limited Edition" series, Arieto, won first in Class B of the SORC, and the Montego Bay Race. Also in 1971, Endurance, a 43-footer as well, won the Chicago-Mackinac Race. In 1972, Condor, the prototype Redline 41 won SORC overall and the 43 foot Arieto won the Nassau and Governor's cups.

During the formative years of C&C Yachts the company sold their early racing hull molds to build capital for development of a comprehensive line of C&C branded racer/cruisers. For example, the venerable Redline 41 design was sold to Lindsay Plastics for production and became the Newport 41 which was later produced by Capital Yachts.

The demands of managing a large multi-national company, with the attendant problems of finance and being answerable to a board of directors, in 1973 led Cuthbertson to take on the position of president, and hand over his design responsibilities to Robert Ball.

High oil prices and a strong Canadian dollar provided the environment for rapid growth for C&C and the entire sailing industry. In 1974, Cuthbertson was elected to membership in the Royal Canadian Academy of Arts. C&C experienced double-digit growth throughout the decade of the 1970s. Plant expansion into the Port of Rhode Island and 56,000 square foot facility in Middletown, Rhode Island, and the development of a dealer network, proved instrumental factors in a strong business model, but in Kiel, Germany the firm ran into foreign exchange problems when the Deutschmark doubled 1977-1979. Hank Evans joined the company in 1977 to establish a network of inland dealers and once that job was done he stepped into the role of sales manager for the entire line. Dealers found it easy to sell a product with a strong reputation for reliability and high performance. But the death of George Cassian in 1979 cast its pall over affairs.

C&C became the breeding ground for the next generation of boat designers, employing young designers such as Henry Adriaanse, Rob Mazza, Rob Ball, Mark Ellis, and Steve Killing. Designer Mark Ellis left the company in 1976 to draw the Niagara and Nonsuch sailboats for George Hinterhoeller, who had sold his shares in C&C that same year. Robert W. Ball was the chief in-house designer until 1991.

Every Canadian Canada's Cup contender between 1969 and 1978 was a C&C product. The Canada's Cup winner in 1978 was a C&C design, the Two Ton class Evergreen, owned by Don Green with Hans Fogh at the helm. The design was a radical, dinghy-like, 41-foot boat, designed with the aim of winning the trophy. The catastrophic failure of the mast during a "stiff breeze" on Lake Ontario while on a shakedown cruise may have been indicative of design issues, as the C&C design team had exploited loopholes in the regatta rules. As one example, the galley was required to have sink but, in order to save weight, it had no drain, which the rule makers had not thought to specify. The deck hatches opened inward, which could be a safety hazard if they gave way during a capsize or broach, and the Evergreen crew faced protests over this defect in both the SORC and in the Canada's Cup. Upon reflection over the 1979 Fastnet race in which he participated, Skipper Green later said that Evergreen "never should have gone to England" for the Admiral's Cup, which is the destination of most Canada's Cup winners. Canadian Yachting magazine stated fifteen years later that "few yachts have created more controversy than" Evergreen, and that "its extreme design and controversial features ruffled feathers around the world." After the competition that year, the rule books were rewritten to preclude safety problems like those raised by the design of Evergreen, and as a result, C&C never received another commission for a Canada's Cup yacht.

By the early 1980s, C&C found itself at the forefront of the sailing industry, from both sailing performance and business success:

C&C had built more than seven thousand boats since its foundling in 1969. At it highest in 1984, sales were estimated at about $44 million and profits at about $2 million, placing it in the top three North American sailboat builders, along with Hunter Marine and Catalina Yachts.

=== Sale of company ===
Cuthbertson presided over the works until 1981. The success of the 1980 financial year, including sales of $39.7m, delivering a profit of $1.24 per share, brought the unwanted attention of a C&C customer, Jim Plaxton of Great Lakes Airlines fame, who was interested in buying the company. The directors together owned 65 percent of the existing 404,000 shares, which were then trading at around $3.50. The original IPO share price was $4.50 and that was the offer Plaxton made for 51% of the company. The board refused. Meanwhile, Plaxton had formed, with the Deluce family, Delplax holdings to manage what became Air Ontario, and Delplax offered $5.25 a share, this time for all of the shares. The board again demurred, and the offer was raised to $6.00. This was accepted, and so the company was acquired by people unfamiliar with the industry. The company was de-listed from the stock market, as all of its shares were now in private hands. In 1982 Cuthbertson left the company he had founded 20 years earlier. The unfriendly buyout caused 80% of the heyday staff to leave in the Cuthbertson exodus, by 1983.

Plaxton instructed the designers "to undertake a flat-out offshore racer according to the IOR rule." He wanted novel construction materials and novel construction processes to replace the balsa-wood core structures that had been the staple of the firm until the management changeover. The 41' boat that resulted from these instructions, Silver Shadow III, measures a 12'11" beam, while the 41' Evergreen, produced a scant four years earlier, measures 14.25'. The owner and operator of Silver Shadow III, Plaxton, "decided not to participate" in the 1983 Admiral's Cup, and his yacht's place was taken by another C&C boat, Magistri, which was also designed in 1982. This Cup team of three boats managed a fifth-place finish, an all-time high for Canada.

In 1985, under Ball's supervision, C&C's design office had grown to eleven staff, and the firm experienced its racing nadir, with the poor performance at SORC of the company-backed custom 44 Silver Shadow IV, also a 12'11" beam but on a lengthened 43'7" long yacht. Estimates of the total cost of the project approach $1 million. By November 1985, the plant in Middletown was closed, the last of the international manufacturing locations. C&C was left with one single manufacturing operation in Niagara-on-the-Lake when the custom shop in Oakville was closed and the company entered receivership. By 1986, a partnership including Mutual Trust purchased C&C from the receivers. After a financial audit in 1988, an executive of the trust assumed control of the operation.

In the late 1980s rising costs and a shrinking market caused the closure of many boat manufacturers, including Quebec-based Tanzer Industries and Mirage Yachts. The day after the end of the 1990 Toronto International Boat Show, C&C had announced that it needed a cash infusion. The company was again placed in receivership in September, with no prospective buyers and the creditors seeking payment of debts.

==== C&C Yachts International ====
In 1992, there was a temporary reprieve. All assets of C&C Yachts were purchased by the Hong Kong based shipping magnates, Anthony Koo and Frank Chow, who then operated the new organization as C&C Yachts International. By 1994, the Niagara-on-the-Lake factory was operating at capacity, building the new C&C 51, the Tripp designed IMS 45, as well as the SR range of sport boats, designed by Glenn Henderson, which were originally built in Florida.

==== Niagara-on-the-Lake factory fire - April 1994 ====
On 21 April 1994 a fire broke out in the factory, completely destroying the production line, most of the tooling, records and plans. The 1:30 a.m. blaze tore through C&C's production sheds and block-long warehouse that housed the production equipment and fibreglass materials. The fire destroyed 40 molds and the boats currently under construction, including three C&C 51s.

The company's insurance only covered a small portion of the loss and in 1996 the land, boat tooling and trademarks were all sold.

=== The Jackett era ===
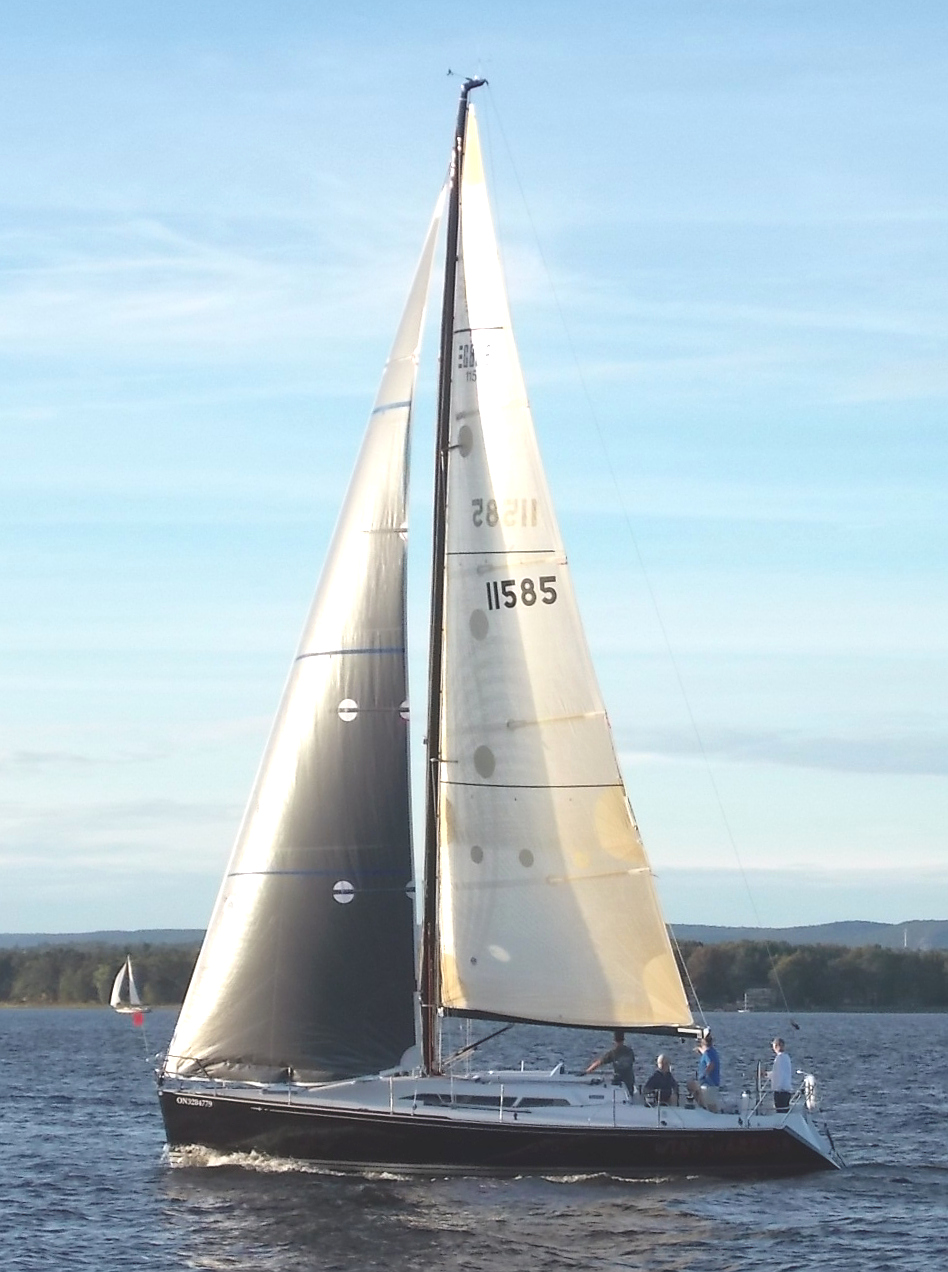
C&C 115

In 1996 the C&C brand and its intellectual materials were acquired by Fairport Yachts, builders of Tartan Yachts, and moved to Fairport, Ohio, where the company started the production of a new line of C&C yachts. These new boats, designed by Tartan's in-house designer Tim Jackett, were intended to preserve the design characteristics and performance of the C&C brand. Starting in 1997, C&C Yachts introduced four new models, the C&C 99, 110, 115, and 121, producing over 150 boats under the new leadership. In 2002, C&C built its entire line with post-cured, foam-cored epoxy hulls with uni-directional "E"-glass and carbon local reinforcements. Beginning in 2004, C&C started equipping all models with carbon-fiber masts as standard equipment.

=== US Watercraft era and closure ===
In September 2013, US Watercraft announced that it had bought the rights to the C&C brand from Tartan and would take over manufacturing of all new C&C models starting in the fall of 2013.

US Watercraft entered receivership in July 2017 to sell its assets, but by the summer of 2018 no buyer had been found, the C&C website had been blanked and production of the last two models, the Redline 41 and C&C 30 One Design ended.

== Cuthbertson archive ==
The Marine Museum of the Great Lakes in Kingston, Ontario, has in its archives the early original C&C design and construction drawings, a retirement donation by Cuthbertson of his papers. In 2008 Jackett, whose company bought the C&C name in 1996, donated the rest of the Cuthbertson papers and more, dating from 1972 through to the late 1980s. Cuthbertson died at the age of 88 on 3 October 2017; he had served on the board of directors of the MMGL for many years, and had been inducted into the Canadian Sailing Hall of Fame in 2014.

== C&C models ==
Models include:

- C&C 1/2 Ton 1975
- C&C 24 1975
- C&C 25 1973
- C&C 25 MKII 1980
- C&C 25 Redline 1969
- C&C 26 1976
- C&C 26 Encounter 1978
- C&C 26 Wave 1988
- C&C 27 MK I 1970
- C&C 27 MK II 1972
- C&C 27 MK III 1974
- C&C 27 MK IV 1981
- C&C 27 MK V 1984
- C&C 29 1977
- C&C 29-2 1983
- C&C 3/4 Ton 1974
- C&C 30 Redwing 1967
- C&C 30-1 1973
- C&C 30-2 1988
- C&C 30 One Design
- C&C Corvette 31 1966
- C&C 32 1981
- C&C 33 1974
- C&C 33-2 1984
- C&C 34 1977
- C&C 34/36 1989
- C&C 34+DK 1989
- C&C 34+R 1989
- C&C 34+WK 1989
- C&C 35-1 (Redwing 35) 1969
- C&C 35-2 1973
- C&C 35-3 1982
- C&C 36-1 1977
- C&C 36R 1971
- C&C Invader 36 1966
- C&C Frigate 36 1968
- C&C 37 1981
- C&C 37/40 R 1988
- C&C 37/40 XL 1989
- C&C 37/40+ 1988
- C&C 37-2 1988
- C&C 38-1 1973
- C&C 38-2 1975
- C&C 38-3 1985
- C&C 39 1971
- C&C 40 Crusader 1968
- C&C 40-1 1970
- C&C 40-2 1978
- C&C 40-2 AC 1977
- C&C 40 R 1993
- C&C 40 XL 1993
- C&C 40+ 1993
- C&C 41 1981
- C&C 41 GP 1981
- C&C 41 Limited Edition 1981
- C&C 42 Custom 1976
- C&C 43-1 1971
- C&C 43-2 1980
- C&C 44 1985
- C&C 44 Custom 1985
- C&C 45 2000
- C&C 46 1973
- C&C 48 Custom 1973
- C&C 50 1972
- C&C 51 Custom 1986
- C&C 52 Custom 1978
- C&C 53 Inferno 1976
- C&C Custom Pilothouse 54
- C&C 57 1988
- C&C 61 1971
- C&C Custom 62 1982
- C&C 66 1973
- C&C Custom 67 1980
- C&C 99 2002
- C&C 101 2012
- C&C 110 1999
- C&C 115 2005
- C&C 121 1999
- C&C 131 2008
- Landfall 35
- Landfall 38
- Landfall 39
- Landfall 42
- Landfall 43
- Landfall 48
- Redline 41
- Shark 24 1959

== C&C designed sailboats (for other manufacturers) ==
Over the years the firm designed yachts for a number of other Canadian boat builders, including CS Yachts, Mirage Yachts, Northern Yachts, Ontario Yachts, Paceship Yachts, and Tanzer Industries,. C&C also designed boats for manufacturers in the US, such as Newport series for Lindsey Plastics (later Capital Yachts) of Harbor City, California, Harpoon for Boston Whaler, and Lancers for Lancer Yacht Corporation, in Irvine, California. In England, Anstey Yachts built the Trapper 27, 28, and 35 (which was a C&C 35). C&C designed several yachts for OY Baltic in Finland and the Benello 37 for Cantiere Benello in Livorno, Italy.

A full list appears below.

- Ajax 28
- Baltic 33
- Baltic 37
- Baltic 39
- Baltic 46
- Baltic 51
- Benello 37
- Bluejacket 23
- Caprice 15
- C&C 30E
- Classic 22
- Evelyn 24
- Gazelle 22
- Grampian 22
- Harpoon 4.6
- Harpoon 5.2
- Harpoon 6.2
- Lancer 29 Mark III
- Lancer 30 Mark II
- Lancer 30 Mark III
- Lancer 30 Mark IV
- Lancer 30 Mark V
- Mark 25
- Mirage 24
- Newport 27-1
- Newport 27-3
- Newport 27S
- Newport 28
- Newport 41
- Niagara 30
- Northern 1/4 Ton
- Northwind 29
- Ontario 28
- Ontario 32
- Ontario 38
- Paceship 2-16
- Paceship 17
- Paceship 20
- Paceship 23
- Paceship 29
- Star Catamaran
- Tanzer 31
- Trapper 27
- Trapper 28
- Trapper 35
- Trapper 400
- Trapper 500/501
- Viking 22
- Viking 28
- Viking 33
- Viking 34
- Whitby 45

== Notable C&C racing sailboats ==
- 40' Red Jacket (1966) - first balsa cored fiberglass hull (light), won 11 of its 13 race series in 1967, SORC Champion 1968, still winning races.
- 41' Condor (1967) - SORC Champion 1972; first of Redline 41 production Racer/Cruiser, also built as Newport 41
- 40' Manitou (1969) - defended 1969 Canada's Cup over S&S Designed NIAGARA, won 4-0
- 35' Cygnus (1970) - Owned by Roy Hawkinson, has won more Port Huron to Mackinac Races than any other boat in history, both Overall (4 times) and in the C&C 35-1 Class (8 times).
- 53' Bonaventure V (1970) - Mac races combined trophy 1970, SORC Champ Class A 1971, many, many years of many wins thereafter.
- 61' Sorcery (1970) - extensively raced, SORC Champion, rolled by a rogue wave in the North Pacific and survived
- 39' Windquest (1972) - Won many races including the Port Huron to Mackinaw and the SORC.
- 61' Robon (1972) - first to finish of 180 starters in a heavy upwind Bermuda Race 1972
- 41' Evergreen (1977) - custom IOR Two-Tonner built 1978 for Don Green of Royal Hamilton Yacht Club, won Canada's Cup back from U.S. in 1978 after an absence of six years
- 39' Magistri (1982) - Selected to the Canadian Admiral's Cup team, she won the Channel Race overall – the first-ever overall win by a Canadian yacht in an Admiral's Cup event. Her final series placing was sixth in fleet, also a best-ever for Canadian sailors.
- 40' Fastrack (1988) - Many wins in her first season of racing in 1988, including Block Island Race Week, and Whidbey Island Race Week

== See also ==
- List of sailboat designers and manufacturers
