= Landfall 42 =

Sailboat class

Development
- Designer: C&C Design
- Location: Canada
- Year: 1976
- Builder: C&C Yachts
- Name: Landfall 42

Boat
- Displacement: 21,000 lb (9,525 kg)
- Draft: 5.00 ft (1.52 m)

Hull
- Type: Monohull
- Construction: Fibreglass
- LOA: 41.67 ft (12.70 m)
- LWL: 30.00 ft (9.14 m)
- Beam: 12.50 ft (3.81 m)
- Engine: Perkins Engines 4-108 50 hp (37 kW) diesel engine

Hull appendages
- Keel: fin keel
- Ballast: 8,800 lb (3,992 kg)
- Rudder: skeg-mounted rudder

Rig
- Rig type: Cutter rig
- I foretriangle height: 48.00 ft (14.63 m)
- J foretriangle base: 16.30 ft (4.97 m)
- P mainsail luff: 41.00 ft (12.50 m)
- E mainsail foot: 15.50 ft (4.72 m)

Sails
- Sailplan: Cutter
- Mainsail area: 317.75 sq ft (29.520 m^{2})
- Jib/genoa area: 391.20 sq ft (36.344 m^{2})
- Total sail area: 708.95 sq ft (65.864 m^{2})

The Landfall 42 is a sailboat that was designed by C&C Design and first built in 1976. The Landfall 42 was built principally for the charter trade, to compete with Morgan, Irwin, and Whitby's models, and gained some popularity as a charter boat in the Caribbean. The Landfall 42 was the first example of a trend within C&C Yachts toward more cruising-oriented designs under company president George Cuthbertson's direction, a trend continued with an expansion of the Landfall series during the later 1970s and early 1980s.

== Production ==
The design was built by the Canadian company C&C Yachts starting in 1976, but it is now out of production.

== Design ==
The Landfall 42 is a recreational keelboat, built predominantly of fibreglass, with wood trim. It has a cutter rig, a rounded raked stem, a raised transom, a skeg-mounted rudder controlled by a wheel and a fixed fin keel. It displaces 21,000 lb (9,525 kg) and carries 8,800 lb (3,992 kg) of lead ballast.

The boat has a draft of 5.00 ft (1.52 m) with the standard keel fitted.

The boat is fitted with a British Perkins Engines 4-108 diesel engine of 50 hp (37 kW). The fuel tank holds 55 U.S. gallons (210 L; 46 imp gal) and the fresh water tank has a capacity of 200 U.S. gallons (760 L; 170 imp gal).

The design has a hull speed of 7.34 kn (13.59 km/h).

== See also ==
- List of sailing boat types

Related development

- C&C 38-2
