= B Boats B-32 =

Sailboat class

B-Boats B-32
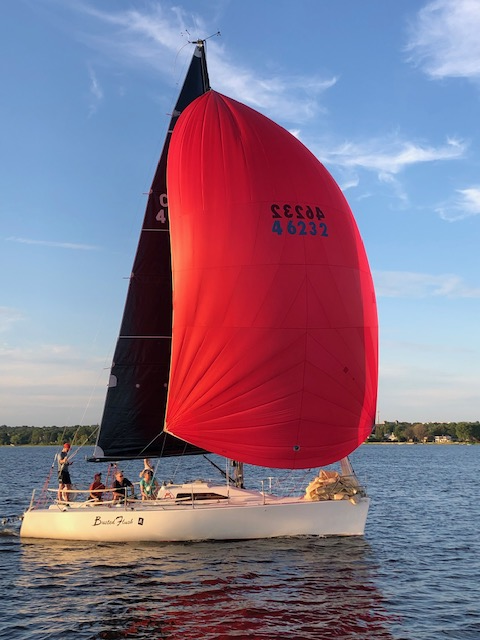

Development
- Designer: Leif Beiley
- Location: United States
- Year: 1995
- No. built: 14
- Builder: B Boats
- Name: B-Boats B-32

Boat
- Displacement: 4,100 lb (1,860 kg)
- Draft: 6.42 ft (1.96 m)

Hull
- Type: Monohull
- Construction: Fiberglass
- LOA: 32.00 ft (9.75 m)
- LWL: 27.50 ft (8.38 m)
- Beam: 10.33 ft (3.15 m)

Hull appendages
- Keel: bulb fin keel
- Ballast: 1,650 lb (748 kg)
- Rudder: internally-mounted spade-type rudder

Rig
- General: Fractional rigged sloop
- I foretriangle height: 39.75 ft (12.12 m)
- J foretriangle base: 10.92 ft (3.33 m)
- P mainsail luff: 39.50 ft (12.04 m)
- E mainsail foot: 14.33 ft (4.37 m)

Sails
- Mainsail area: 283.02 sq ft (26.293 m^{2})
- Jib/genoa area: 217.04 sq ft (20.164 m^{2})
- Total sail area: 500.05 sq ft (46.456 m^{2})

Racing
- PHRF: 72 (average)

The B-32 is an American racing sailboat, that was designed by Leif Beiley and first built in 1995.

== Production ==
The boat was built by B Boats in the United States, who constructed just 14 examples, starting in 1995, before production ceased. The B-32 was recognized as the Best PHRF/Sportboat of the year for 1996 by Sailing World.

== Design ==
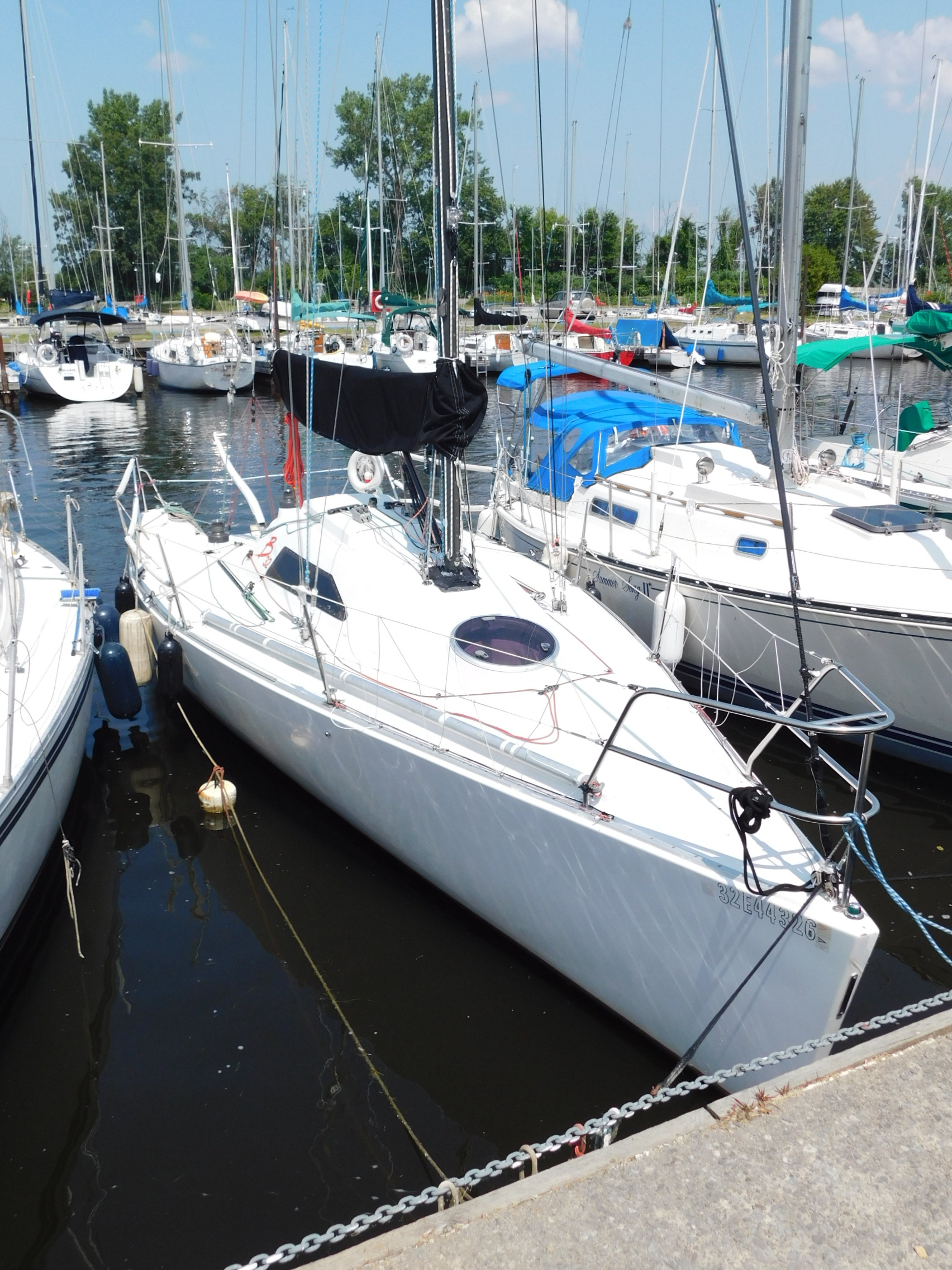
B Boats B32

Designer Leif Beiley described the boat's design goals, "I designed the B32 back in 1995 as a development of the B25, which we had a lot of success with. It was designed to excel in the conditions we usually have in southern California: 8-15 knot winds and ocean waves. We wanted a boat that wasn't extreme in any direction, just a good all-around performer that was affordable for people moving up from the smaller sportboats like the B25, Express 27, Moore 24, etc. Therefore we didn't use exotic materials in the structure or in the rig. The B32 won Sailing World's 1996 SportBoat Of The Year award and went on to have an illustrious record of wins in many major regattas. Twenty-five years on, B32's are still highly sought after and continue to win races."

The B-32 is a racing keelboat, built predominantly of fiberglass. It has a fractional sloop rig, an internally-mounted spade-type rudder and a fixed fin keel with a weight bulb. It displaces 4,100 lb (1,860 kg) and carries 1,650 lb (748 kg) of lead ballast.

The boat has a draft of 6.42 ft (1.96 m) with the standard bulb fin keel and 4.33 ft (1.32 m) with the optional shoal draft keel.

The boat has a PHRF racing average handicap of 72 with a high of 84 and low of 66. It has a hull speed of 7.03 kn (13.02 km/h).

== See also ==
- List of sailing boat types

Similar sailboats

- Archambault A35
- Cape 31
- C&C 101
- C&C SR 33
- Catalina 275 Sport
- Express 27
- Farr 30
- Flying Tiger 10 M
- Hotfoot 27
- J/92
- Melges 32
- Mirage 30 SX
- X-35 (yacht)
