= J/32 =

Sailboat class

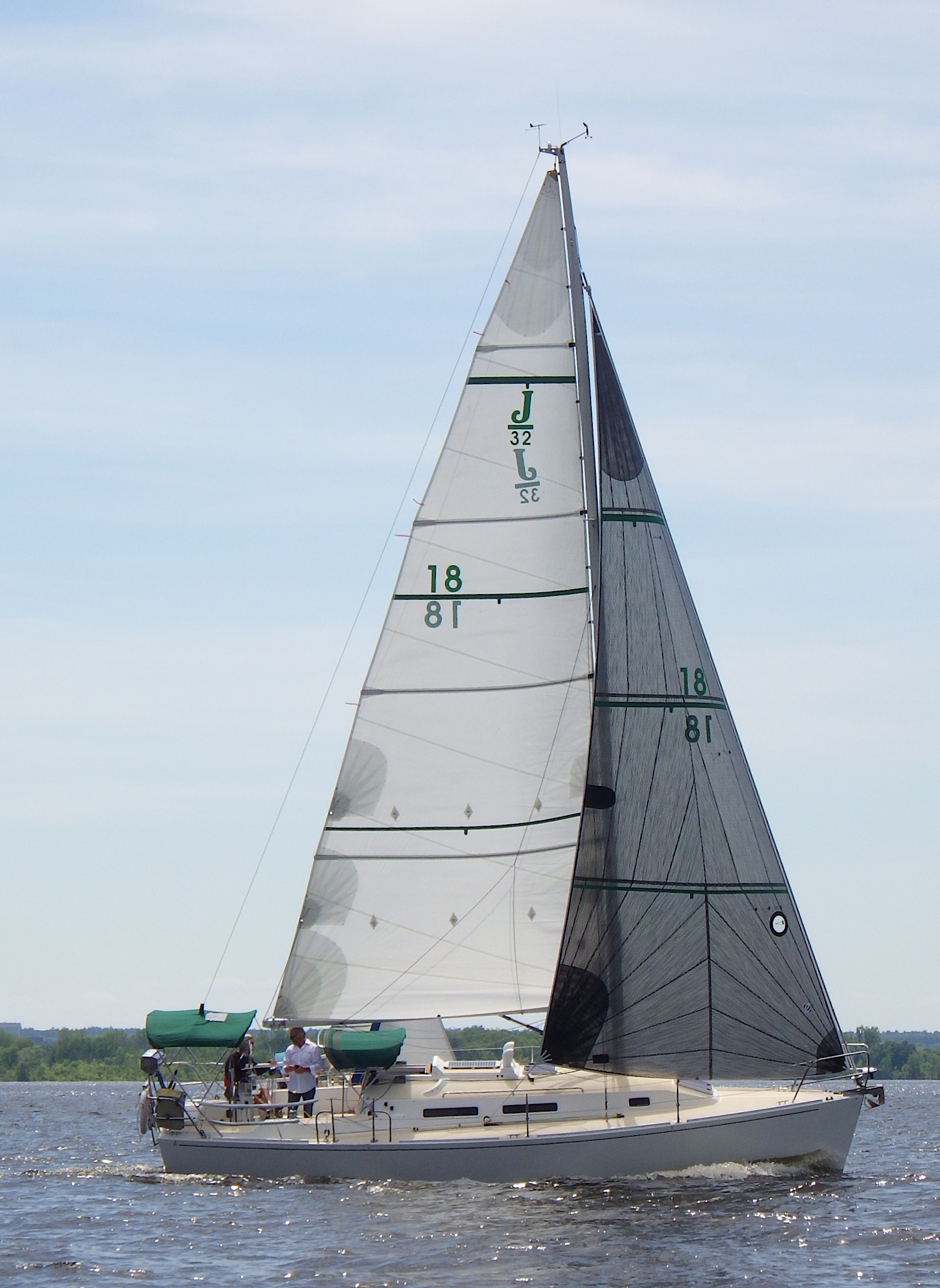

Development
- Designer: Alan Johnstone
- Location: United States
- Year: 1996
- No. built: 85
- Builder: J Boats (Tillotson Pearson)
- Name: J/32

Boat
- Displacement: 10,000 lb (4,536 kg)
- Draft: 6.00 ft (1.83 m)

Hull
- Type: Monohull
- Construction: Fiberglass
- LOA: 32.40 ft (9.88 m)
- LWL: 29.00 ft (8.84 m)
- Beam: 11.00 ft (3.35 m)
- Engine: Yanmar diesel engine 27 hp (20 kW)

Hull appendages
- Keel: fin bulb keel
- Ballast: 3,840 lb (1,742 kg)
- Rudder: internally-mounted spade-type rudder

Rig
- General: Fractional rigged sloop
- I foretriangle height: 39.20 ft (11.95 m)
- J foretriangle base: 11.00 ft (3.35 m)
- P mainsail luff: 38.50 ft (11.73 m)
- E mainsail foot: 15.50 ft (4.72 m)

Sails
- Mainsail area: 298.38 sq ft (27.720 m^{2})
- Jib/genoa area: 215.60 sq ft (20.030 m^{2})
- Total sail area: 513.98 sq ft (47.750 m^{2})

The J/32 is an American sailboat, that was designed by Alan Johnstone and first built in 1996.

== Production ==
The boat was built by Tillotson Pearson for J Boats in the United States, starting in 1996, with 85 examples completed. The design is now out of production.

== Design ==
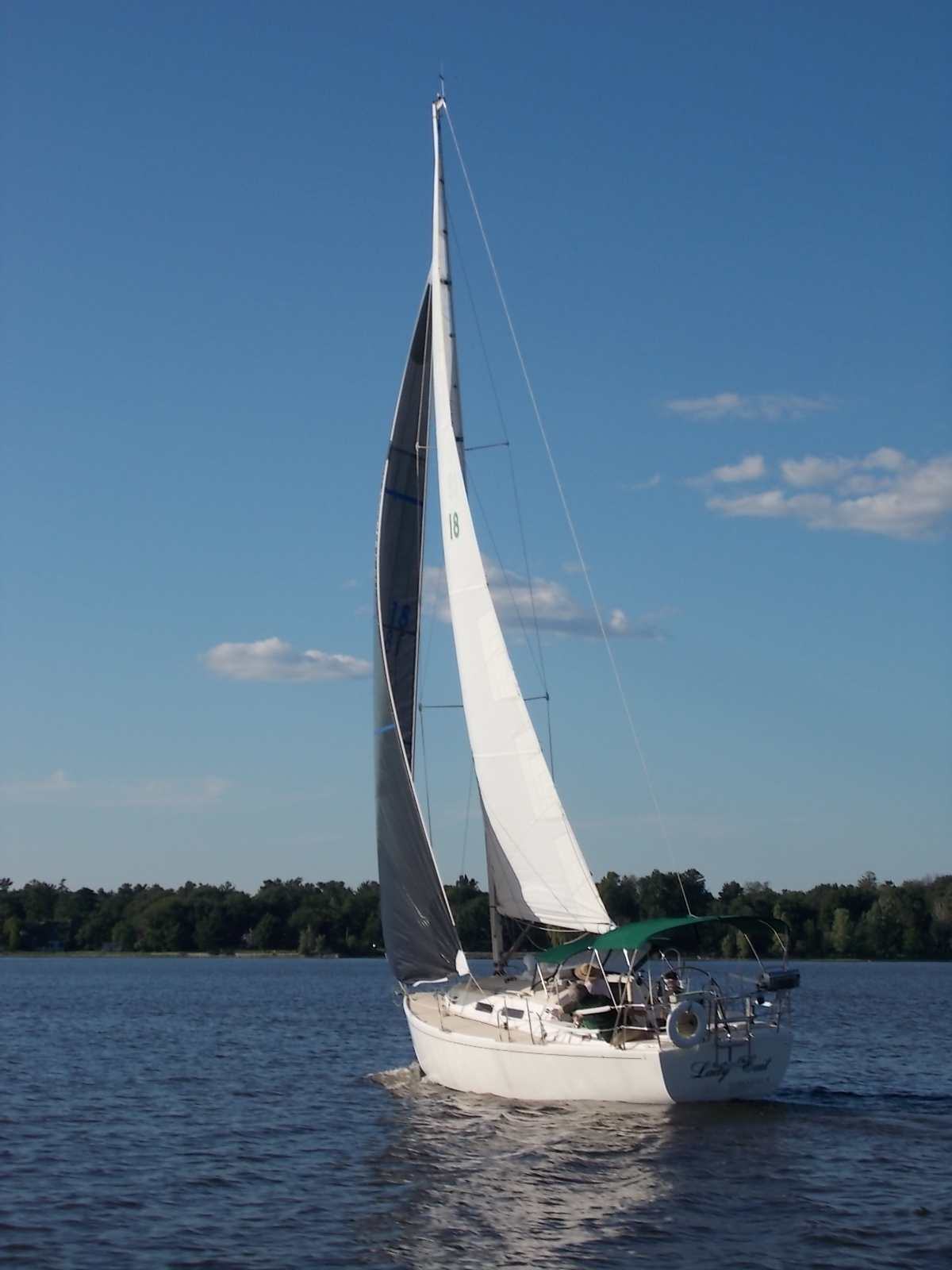
J/32

The J/32 is a small recreational keelboat, built predominantly of fiberglass. It has a fractional sloop rig, an internally-mounted spade-type rudder and a fixed fin keel with a weighted bulb.

The design displaces 10,000 lb (4,536 kg) and carries 3,840 lb (1,742 kg) of lead ballast.

The J/32 has a draft of 6.00 ft (1.83 m) with the standard keel and 4.75 ft (1.45 m) with the optional shoal draft keel.

The boat is fitted with a Japanese Yanmar diesel engine of 27 hp (20 kW). The fresh water tank has a capacity of 50 U.S. gallons (190 L; 42 imp gal).

The design has a hull speed of 7.22 kn (13.37 km/h).

== Operational history ==
In a review for Sail Magazine Robby Robinson wrote, "I had the opportunity to spend four days sailing the boat, and what fun days they were. Although the J/32 might be considered stiff by some, I liked this characteristic, because it allows the boat to accelerate out of a tack efficiently. Part of the secret- the cockpit is efficient, and visibility from the helm is good even with the dodger up. The mainsheet tackle system is double-ended and easy to handle.".

In a Sailing Breezes review, Thom Burns, was emotive about the design and wrote, "you’re getting a modern interior and a state of the art cruising rig. You’re getting a boat you can be proud of for years to come. The ideal cruising boat for many years has been the classic 40 foot sloop. For many, this may no longer be true. When a 32 footer feels like a 40 footer you’re going to sail with a smile. Bring along a great conversationalist and a well stocked library, there’s not much to do!".

Practical Sailor published a review in 2000, that concluded, "we think Alan Johnstone hit the target he was aiming for. She’s a legitimate performance cruiser with spacious accommodations."

In a 2002 review Herb McCormick wrote for Cruising World, "as one who has often wandered the docks muttering that nothing new has occurred in the sailboat market in the last 20 years, I walked off the J/32 ready to eat my words, my hat, or whatever else was offered. Young couples or retired ones looking for a boat that’s a blast to sail and still full of creature comfort should put this one on their shopping lists."

== See also ==
- List of sailing boat types

Related development

- J/22
- J/24
- J/27

Similar sailboats

- Bayfield 30/32
- B Boats B-32
- Beneteau Oceanis 321
- C&C 32
- C&C 99
- Catalina 320
- Contest 32 CS
- Douglas 32
- Hunter 32 Vision
- Hunter 326
- Mirage 32
- Nonsuch 324
- Ontario 32
- Ranger 32
