= C&C 32 =

Sailboat class

Development
- Designer: C&C Design
- Location: Canada
- Year: 1981
- Builder: C&C Yachts
- Name: C&C 32

Boat
- Displacement: 9,680 lb (4,391 kg)
- Draft: 5.67 ft (1.73 m)

Hull
- Type: Monohull
- Construction: Fiberglass
- LOA: 31.50 ft (9.60 m)
- LWL: 24.67 ft (7.52 m)
- Beam: 10.25 ft (3.12 m)
- Engine: Universal Atomic 4 30 hp (22 kW) gasoline engine

Hull appendages
- Keel: fin keel
- Ballast: 3,900 lb (1,769 kg)
- Rudder: internally-mounted spade-type rudder

Rig
- General: Masthead sloop
- I foretriangle height: 41.12 ft (12.53 m)
- J foretriangle base: 12.75 ft (3.89 m)
- P mainsail luff: 35.25 ft (10.74 m)
- E mainsail foot: 11.33 ft (3.45 m)

Sails
- Mainsail area: 199.69 sq ft (18.552 m^{2})
- Jib/genoa area: 262.14 sq ft (24.354 m^{2})
- Total sail area: 461.83 sq ft (42.905 m^{2})

Racing
- PHRF: 162 (average)

The C&C 32 is a Canadian sailboat, that was designed by C&C Design and first built in 1981.

== Production ==
The boat was built by C&C Yachts in Canada, but it is now out of production.

== Design ==
The C&C 32 is a small recreational keelboat, built predominantly of fiberglass, with wood trim. It has a masthead sloop rig, an internally-mounted spade-type rudder and a fixed fin keel or, optionally, a fixed stub keel and centreboard.

The fixed keel version displaces 9,680 lb (4,391 kg) and carries 3,900 lb (1,769 kg) of lead ballast, while the centreboard version displaces 10,485 lb (4,756 kg) and carries 4,705 lb (2,134 kg) of lead ballast.

The boat has a draft of 5.67 ft (1.73 m) with the standard keel and 6.90 ft (2.10 m) with the optional stub keel with the centreboard extended and 4.00 ft (1.22 m) with it retracted.

The boat is fitted with a Universal Atomic 4 30 hp (22 kW) gasoline engine. A Yanmar 2GM diesel engine was available optionally. The fuel tank holds 20 U.S. gallons (76 L; 17 imp gal) and the fresh water tank has a capacity of 30 U.S. gallons (110 L; 25 imp gal).

The fin keel version has a PHRF racing average handicap of 162 with a high of 172 and low of 156. The stub keel and centreboard version has a PHRF racing average handicap of 171 with a high of 171 and low of 171. It has a hull speed of 6.66 kn (12.33 km/h).

== Operational history ==
In a review Michael McGoldrick wrote, "The C&C 32 captures the essence of the cruiser/club racer of the early 1980s. While this boat may not [have] emerged as a C&C classic, it does epitomize the builder's work at the height of its role and reputation in the Canadian sailboat industry. In many ways, this boat seems like the natural evolution of what C&C had started with its earlier 27 and 30 feet models, only everything is a little larger, and its lines are little more modern looking. Below is the familiar dinette arrangement opposite a full length settee, a layout which it has in common with its earlier predecessors. However, the interior of the 32 also has room for a quarter berth and a permanent chart table/navigation station. Outside is a large T-shaped cockpit, and the nice clean lines of the deck and cabin is what helped earn C&C a reputation for coming up with good looking designs."

== See also ==
- List of sailing boat types

Similar sailboats

- Aloha 32
- Bayfield 30/32
- Beneteau 323
- Catalina 320
- Columbia 32
- Contest 32 CS
- Douglas 32
- Hunter 32 Vision
- Hunter 326
- J/32
- Mirage 32
- Morgan 32
- Nonsuch 324
- Ontario 32
- Ranger 32
- Watkins 32
