= Hunter 326 =

Sailboat class

Development
- Designer: Glenn Henderson
- Location: United States
- Year: 2001
- Builder: Hunter Marine
- Name: Hunter 326

Boat
- Displacement: 8,300 lb (3,765 kg)
- Draft: 5.83 ft (1.78 m)

Hull
- Type: Monohull
- Construction: Fiberglass
- LOA: 31.92 ft (9.73 m)
- LWL: 28.33 ft (8.63 m)
- Beam: 10.83 ft (3.30 m)
- Engine: Yanmar 18 hp (13 kW) diesel engine

Hull appendages
- Keel: fin keel
- Ballast: 3,200 lb (1,451 kg)
- Rudder: internally-mounted spade-type rudder

Rig
- Rig type: Bermuda rig
- I foretriangle height: 36.83 ft (11.23 m)
- J foretriangle base: 12.00 ft (3.66 m)
- P mainsail luff: 34.33 ft (10.46 m)
- E mainsail foot: 12.58 ft (3.83 m)

Sails
- Sailplan: Fractional B&R rigged sloop
- Mainsail area: 215.94 sq ft (20.061 m^{2})
- Jib/genoa area: 220.98 sq ft (20.530 m^{2})
- Total sail area: 436.92 sq ft (40.591 m^{2})

The Hunter 326 is an American sailboat that was designed by Glenn Henderson for cruising and first built in 2001.

The design forms a scaled series with the Hunter 306 and the 356.

== Production ==
The design was built by Hunter Marine in the United States starting in 2001, but it is now out of production.

== Design ==
The Hunter 326 is a recreational keelboat, built predominantly of fiberglass reinforced with kevlar. It has a fractional sloop B&R rig, a raked stem, an open walk-through reverse transom with integral swim ladder, an internally-mounted spade-type rudder controlled by a wheel and a fixed fin keel. It displaces 8,300 lb (3,765 kg) and carries 3,200 lb (1,451 kg) of lead ballast.

The boat has a draft of 5.83 ft (1.78 m) with the standard keel and 4.33 ft (1.32 m) with the optional shoal draft keel.

The boat is fitted with a Japanese Yanmar 2GMF diesel engine of 18 hp (13 kW). The fuel tank holds 28 U.S. gallons (110 L; 23 imp gal) and the fresh water tank has a capacity of 50 U.S. gallons (190 L; 42 imp gal).

Factory standard equipment included a roller furling 110% genoa and mast-furling mainsail, teak interior, a stainless steel arch which mounts the mainsheet traveler.

The design has a hull speed of 7.13 kn (13.20 km/h).

== Operational history ==
Chicago Sailing is a commercial sailboat rental organization that rents Hunter 326s. They describe the design's strong points, "From day one, Hunter 326s have been the most popular boats in our fleet. Not only do they accommodate as many as eight adults in comfort and style, they are easy to sail and safe in all conditions...The Hunter 326 is a delight to sail in all conditions. With a furling jib and self-stacking mainsail, sail handling on the Hunter 326 is easy. All controls are just an arm’s length from the helm. That means you and your guests remain safe and comfortable at all times, never having to leave the cockpit except to sunbathe on the open deck."

A Boating World review in 2001, when the design was introduced, described the series, "the new Hunter 326 represents the beginnings of a complete redesign of Hunter’s entire fleet." Of the interior the reviewer wrote, "The 326’s wide beam and 6 feet, 4 inches of headroom allow you to really stretch out. A pair of settees flanks a leafed tabletop with an impressive high-gloss finish. Hatches and portlights flood the area with natural light and ventilation. The forward berth, which can be closed off for privacy with a solid teak door, continues the decorating scheme ... It might be hard to believe that everything you’re seeing from the interior vantage point is part of a module that was completely assembled outside the hull. A few years ago, Luhrs began modularizing the cabins on its fishing boats. The move produced a significant cost savings that allowed the company to increase the number and level of accessories on the boats, while still maintaining an attractive price point. The modules are continuously tabbed and bonded to the hull for strength and rigidity along their length, width and height." The review concluded, "It’s an easy-to-handle vessel with cabin amenities and construction quality that are truly impressive."

== See also ==
- List of sailing boat types

Related development

- Hunter 306
- Hunter 356

Similar sailboats

- Aloha 32
- Bayfield 30/32
- Beneteau 323
- Beneteau Oceanis 321
- C&C 32
- C&C 99
- Catalina 320
- Columbia 32
- Contest 32 CS
- Douglas 32
- Hunter 32 Vision
- Mirage 32
- Nonsuch 324
- Ontario 32
- Ranger 32
- Watkins 32
