= Watkins 32 =

Sailboat class

Development
- Designer: William Tripp Jr
- Location: United States
- Year: 1982
- No. built: 8
- Builder: Watkins Yachts
- Name: Watkins 32

Boat
- Displacement: 10,800 lb (4,899 kg)
- Draft: 4.00 ft (1.22 m)

Hull
- Type: Monohull
- Construction: Fiberglass
- LOA: 32.50 ft (9.91 m)
- LWL: 26.58 ft (8.10 m)
- Beam: 10.17 ft (3.10 m)
- Engine: Yanmar 15 or 22 hp (11 or 16 kW) diesel engine

Hull appendages
- Keel: fin keel
- Ballast: 5,500 lb (2,495 kg)
- Rudder: skeg-mounted rudder

Rig
- Rig type: Bermuda rig
- I foretriangle height: 38.75 ft (11.81 m)
- J foretriangle base: 13.75 ft (4.19 m)
- P mainsail luff: 33.00 ft (10.06 m)
- E mainsail foot: 12.25 ft (3.73 m)

Sails
- Sailplan: Masthead sloop
- Mainsail area: 202.13 sq ft (18.778 m^{2})
- Jib/genoa area: 266.41 sq ft (24.750 m^{2})
- Total sail area: 468.53 sq ft (43.528 m^{2})

The Watkins 32 is an American sailboat that was designed by William H. Tripp Jr as a cruiser and first built in 1982.

The design was derived from the molds used for the Columbia 32.

== Production ==
The design was built by Watkins Yachts in the United States, commencing in 1982. The company completed eight examples of the design before shifting production to a modified version, the Watkins 33 in 1984.

== Design ==
The Watkins 32 is a recreational keelboat, built predominantly of fiberglass, with wood trim. It has a masthead sloop rig, a raked stem, an angled transom, a skeg-mounted rudder controlled by a tiller and a fixed fin keel. It displaces 10,800 lb (4,899 kg) and carries 5,500 lb (2,495 kg) of ballast.

The boat has a draft of 4.00 ft (1.22 m) with the standard keel fitted.

The boat is fitted with a Japanese Yanmar diesel engine of either 15 or 22 hp (11 or 16 kW). The fuel tank holds 30 U.S. gallons (110 L; 25 imp gal) and the fresh water tank has a capacity of 40 U.S. gallons (150 L; 33 imp gal).

The galley is to starboard and can be fitted with a two-burner alcohol or propane-fire stove, plus a refrigerator. The head and a hanging locker are forward, just aft of the forepeak V-berth. A port-side dinette table, that converts to a double berth and a quarter berth are in the main cabin, with the navigation station to port. The interior doors are all made from louvered teak.

Ventilation is provided by six opening ports, plus a forward hatch over the V-berth.

An anchor locker is fitted in the bow. The halyards and outhaul are all internally-led, with halyard winches being a factory-option. The boat is equipped with a topping lift, internal jiffy reefing and has two jib sheet winches.

== Operational history ==
The boat is supported by an active class club, the Watkins Owners.

In a review Richard Sherwood wrote, "while the freeboard is high, the cabin is kept low to reduce windage. Both the keel and the rudder are medium in depth, and with a draft of four feet, the Watkins can be used for gunkholing."

== See also ==
- List of sailing boat types

Related development

- Watkins 33

Similar sailboats

- Aloha 32
- Bayfield 30/32
- Beneteau 323
- C&C 32
- Contest 32 CS
- Douglas 32
- Hunter 32 Vision
- Hunter 326
- Mirage 32
- Morgan 32
- Ontario 32
- Nonsuch 324
- Ranger 32
