= Columbia 32 =

Sailboat class

Development
- Designer: William H. Tripp Jr.
- Location: United States
- Year: 1975
- No. built: 80
- Builder: Columbia Yachts
- Name: Columbia 32

Boat
- Displacement: 9,450 lb (4,286 kg)
- Draft: 5.50 ft (1.68 m)

Hull
- Type: Monohull
- Construction: Fiberglass
- LOA: 32.08 ft (9.78 m)
- LWL: 26.50 ft (8.08 m)
- Beam: 9.50 ft (2.90 m)
- Engine: Inboard motor

Hull appendages
- Keel: fin keel
- Ballast: 4,050 lb (1,837 kg)
- Rudder: Skegm-mounted rudder

Rig
- Rig type: Bermuda rig
- I foretriangle height: 42.20 ft (12.86 m)
- J foretriangle base: 13.90 ft (4.24 m)
- P mainsail luff: 37.00 ft (11.28 m)
- E mainsail foot: 12.00 ft (3.66 m)

Sails
- Sailplan: Masthead sloop
- Mainsail area: 222.00 sq ft (20.624 m^{2})
- Jib/genoa area: 293.29 sq ft (27.248 m^{2})
- Total sail area: 515.29 sq ft (47.872 m^{2})

The Columbia 32 is an American sailboat that was designed by William H. Tripp Jr. and first built in 1975.

The boat was derived from the shorter Columbia 30.

The Columbia 32 design was previously sold by Coronado Yachts as the Coronado 32, starting in 1973 and was later sold by Sailcrafter as the Sailcrafter 32, commencing in 1977. It was also developed into the Watkins 32 in 1982.

== Production ==
The design was built by Columbia Yachts in the United States from 1975 to 1976, with 80 boats completed, but it is now out of production.

== Design ==
The Columbia 32 is a recreational keelboat, built predominantly of fiberglass, with wood trim. It has a masthead sloop rig, a raked stem, an angled transom, a skeg-mounted rudder controlled by a tiller and a fixed fin keel. It displaces 9,450 lb (4,286 kg) and carries 4,040 lb (1,833 kg) of ballast.

The boat has a draft of 5.50 ft (1.68 m) with the standard keel fitted.

The boat is fitted with a gasoline inboard motor, driving a two-bladed bronze propeller, for docking and maneuvering. The fuel tank holds 20 U.S. gallons (76 L; 17 imp gal) and the fresh water tank has a capacity of 50 U.S. gallons (190 L; 42 imp gal).

Below decks the design has a main salon featuring a folding, drop-down table with two settees that can be converted into upper and lower pilot berths. The galley has a 75 lb (34 kg) capacity icebox and a stainless steel sink. The head is fully enclosed.

The design has a hull speed of 6.9 kn (12.8 km/h).

== See also ==
- List of sailing boat types

Related development

- Watkins 32

Similar sailboats

- Aloha 32
- Bayfield 30/32
- Beneteau 323
- C&C 32
- Columbia 30
- Contest 32 CS
- Douglas 32
- Hunter 32 Vision
- Hunter 326
- Mirage 32
- Morgan 32
- Ontario 32
- Nonsuch 324
- Ranger 32
