= Aloha 32 =

Sailboat class

Development
- Designer: Mark Ellis
- Location: Canada
- Year: 1979
- Builder: Aloha Yachts
- Name: Aloha 32

Boat
- Displacement: 9,800 lb (4,445 kg)
- Draft: 4.75 ft (1.45 m)

Hull
- Type: Monohull
- Construction: Fibreglass
- LOA: 32.42 ft (9.88 m)
- LWL: 25.00 ft (7.62 m)
- Beam: 10.83 ft (3.30 m)
- Engine: Westerbeke diesel engine

Hull appendages
- Keel: fin keel
- Ballast: 4,018 lb (1,823 kg)
- Rudder: internally-mounted spade-type rudder

Rig
- Rig type: Bermuda rig
- I foretriangle height: 42.00 ft (12.80 m)
- J foretriangle base: 14.50 ft (4.42 m)
- P mainsail luff: 36.50 ft (11.13 m)
- E mainsail foot: 12.00 ft (3.66 m)

Sails
- Sailplan: Masthead sloop
- Mainsail area: 219.00 sq ft (20.346 m^{2})
- Jib/genoa area: 304.50 sq ft (28.289 m^{2})
- Total sail area: 523.50 sq ft (48.635 m^{2})

Racing
- PHRF: 171

The Aloha 32 is a Canadian sailboat that was designed by Mark Ellis as a cruiser and first built in 1979.

== Production ==
The design was built by Aloha Yachts, a brand of Ouyang Boat Works, in Canada from 1979 to 1988, but it is now out of production.

== Design ==
The Aloha 32 is a recreational keelboat, built predominantly of fibreglass, with teak wooden trim. It has a masthead sloop rig, a spooned raked stem, a raised transom, an internally mounted spade-type rudder controlled by a wheel and a fixed fin keel. It displaces 9,800 lb (4,445 kg) and carries 4,018 lb (1,823 kg) of lead ballast. The bow has an anchor chain locker and roller.

The boat has a draft of 4.75 ft (1.45 m) with the standard keel and 3.2 ft (0.98 m) with the optional shoal draft keel.

The boat is fitted with a Westerbeke diesel engine 21 hp (16 kW) or a Universal diesel of 16 hp (12 kW). The fuel tank holds 30 U.S. gallons (110 L; 25 imp gal) and the fresh water tank has a capacity of 60 U.S. gallons (230 L; 50 imp gal).

The design has two interior layouts, one that dispenses with the bow "V"-berth. The galley is located to port, at the bottom of the companionway steps and features foot-pumped water, a single sink and a two-burner kerosene stove. The head is to starboard, opposite the gallery. The cabin sole is teak and holly and the provided interior lockers have cane doors. There are teak battens mounted on the cabin ceiling. There is 76 in (193 cm) of headroom in the main cabin.

Ventilation is provided by two large translucent hatches and two small ones, plus six opening, screened posts.

From the factory the boat came with an "Ulmer" mainsail and two genoas, a number 1 and number 3. Reefing, outhaul and halyards are all by internal lines.

The design has a PHRF racing average handicap of 171.

== Operational history ==
A review by Richard Sherwood described the design, "the Aloha is light and should accelerate well. It is primarily a cruiser.

In a review Michael McGoldrick wrote, "Mark Ellis appears to have successfully squeezed in everything from the Niagara 35 into this 32 footer - everything is just a little tighter. Aside from 3 feet in the overall length, the main difference between the two boats is that one was manufactured by Hinterhoeller, and the other by Aloha (two builders who had good reputations)."

== See also ==
- List of sailing boat types

Similar sailboats

- Bayfield 30/32
- Beneteau 323
- C&C 32
- Columbia 32
- Douglas 32
- Hunter 32 Vision
- Hunter 326
- Mirage 32
- Nonsuch 324
- Ontario 32
- Ranger 32
- Watkins 32
