= Contest 32 CS =

Sailboat class

Development
- Designer: Dick Zaal
- Location: Netherlands
- Year: 1978
- Builder: Contest Yachts
- Role: Racer
- Name: Contest 32 CS

Boat
- Displacement: 14,300 lb (6,486 kg)
- Draft: 5.25 ft (1.60 m)

Hull
- Type: Monohull
- Construction: Glassfibre
- LOA: 31.82 ft (9.70 m)
- LWL: 25.66 ft (7.82 m)
- Beam: 10.89 ft (3.32 m)
- Engine: Volvo Penta MD 17C 36 hp (27 kW) diesel engine

Hull appendages
- Keel: fin keel
- Ballast: 6,380 lb (2,894 kg)
- Rudder: Skeg-mounted rudder

Rig
- Rig type: Bermuda rig
- I foretriangle height: 39.30 ft (11.98 m)
- J foretriangle base: 10.60 ft (3.23 m)
- P mainsail luff: 34.50 ft (10.52 m)
- E mainsail foot: 10.50 ft (3.20 m)

Sails
- Sailplan: Masthead sloop or ketch
- Mainsail area: 181.13 sq ft (16.828 m^{2})
- Jib/genoa area: 208.29 sq ft (19.351 m^{2})
- Total sail area: 289.42 sq ft (26.888 m^{2})

The Contest 32 CS is a Dutch sailboat that was designed by Dick Zaal as an International Offshore Rule racer to Lloyd's rules and first built in 1978.

== Production ==
The design was built by Contest Yachts, a division of Conyplex, in the Netherlands between 1978 and 1985. The company completed 100 examples of the type, but it is now out of production.

== Design ==
The Contest 32 CS is a recreational keelboat, built predominantly of glassfibre, with wood trim. It has a masthead sloop rig or option ketch rig, a centre cockpit, a spooned raked stem, a vertical transom, a skeg-mounted rudder controlled by a wheel and a fixed fin keel. It displaces 14,300 lb (6,486 kg) and carries 6,380 lb (2,894 kg) of ballast.

The boat has a draft of 5.25 ft (1.60 m) with the standard keel and 4.25 ft (1.30 m) with the optional shoal draft keel.

The boat is fitted with a Swedish Volvo Penta MD 17C 36 hp (27 kW) diesel engine. The fuel tank holds 48 U.S. gallons (180 L; 40 imp gal) and the fresh water tank has a capacity of 77 U.S. gallons (290 L; 64 imp gal).

The accommodation includes an aft cabin with a double and single berth, two main cabin settees and a drop leaf table and a forward "V"-berth. The interior is finished in teak or mahogany wood.

The galley is amidships on the starboard side and includes a three-burner liquid petroleum gas stove. The head is to port, opposite the gallery and includes a shower. Hot and cold pressure water was a factory option. A navigation station is provided on the port side, forward of the head. All three cabins have ventilation hatches.

A second smaller steering wheel can be fitted on the forward port bulkhead allowing the boat to be used as a motorsailer. There is a bow anchor locker. A spinnaker of 918 sq ft (85.3 m^{2}) was optional.

The mainsail has slab reefing. There are two genoa winches and a third mast-mounted winch for the halyards. A boom vang was a factory option.

== See also ==
- List of sailing boat types

Similar sailboats

- Bayfield 30/32
- B Boats B-32
- Beneteau 323
- Beneteau Oceanis 321
- C&C 32
- Columbia 32
- Douglas 32
- Hunter 32 Vision
- Hunter 326
- J/32
- Mirage 32
- Nonsuch 324
- Ontario 32
- Ranger 32
- Watkins 32
