= Morgan 32 =

Sailboat class

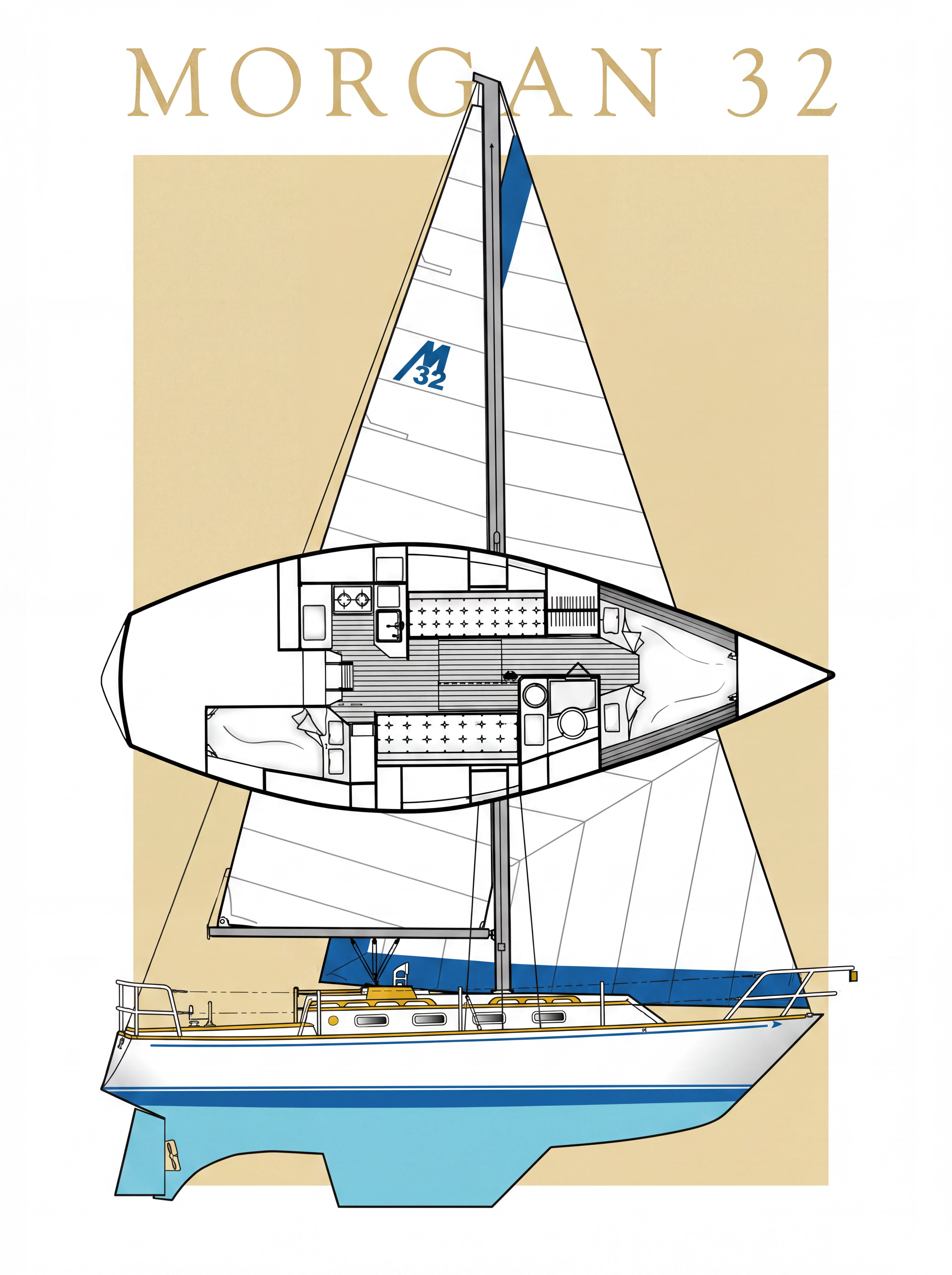
- This original graphic was inspired by period Morgan marketing materials of the Morgan 32 from the 1980s

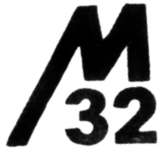

Development
- Designer: Ted Brewer and Jack Corey
- Location: United States
- Year: 1980
- Builder: Morgan Yachts

Boat
- Displacement: 11,000 lb (4,990 kg)
- Draft: 5.33 ft (1.62 m)

Hull
- Type: Monohull
- Construction: Fiberglass
- LOA: 31.92 ft (9.73 m)
- LWL: 25.00 ft (7.62 m)
- Beam: 11.50 ft (3.51 m)
- Engine: Yanmar 2GM20 20 hp (15 kW) or Yanmar 3GM30 diesel engine

Hull appendages
- Keel: semi-fin keel (standard or shoal) with the "Brewer Bite" forward of the propeller aperture
- Ballast: 4,000 lb (1,814 kg)
- Rudder: Skeg-mounted rudder

Rig
- Rig type: Bermuda rig
- I foretriangle height: 41.50 ft (12.65 m)
- J foretriangle base: 13.33 ft (4.06 m)
- P mainsail luff: 36.00 ft (10.97 m)
- E mainsail foot: 12.00 ft (3.66 m)

Sails
- Sailplan: Masthead sloop
- Mainsail area: 216.00 sq ft (20.067 m^{2})
- Jib/genoa area: 276.60 sq ft (25.697 m^{2})
- Total sail area: 492.60 sq ft (45.764 m^{2})

Rating
- D-PN: 86.0

The Morgan 32 is an American sailboat that was designed by Ted Brewer and Jack Corey and first built in 1980.

The Morgan 32 is a scaled-down development of the Morgan 38. It was designed to balance characteristics of a performance cruiser while maximizing interior volume and accommodations.

The design was developed into the Morgan 321, Morgan 322 and Morgan 323 in 1983.

== Production ==
The Morgan 32 was built by Morgan Yachts in the United States from 1980 to 1986, but it is now out of production.

== Design ==
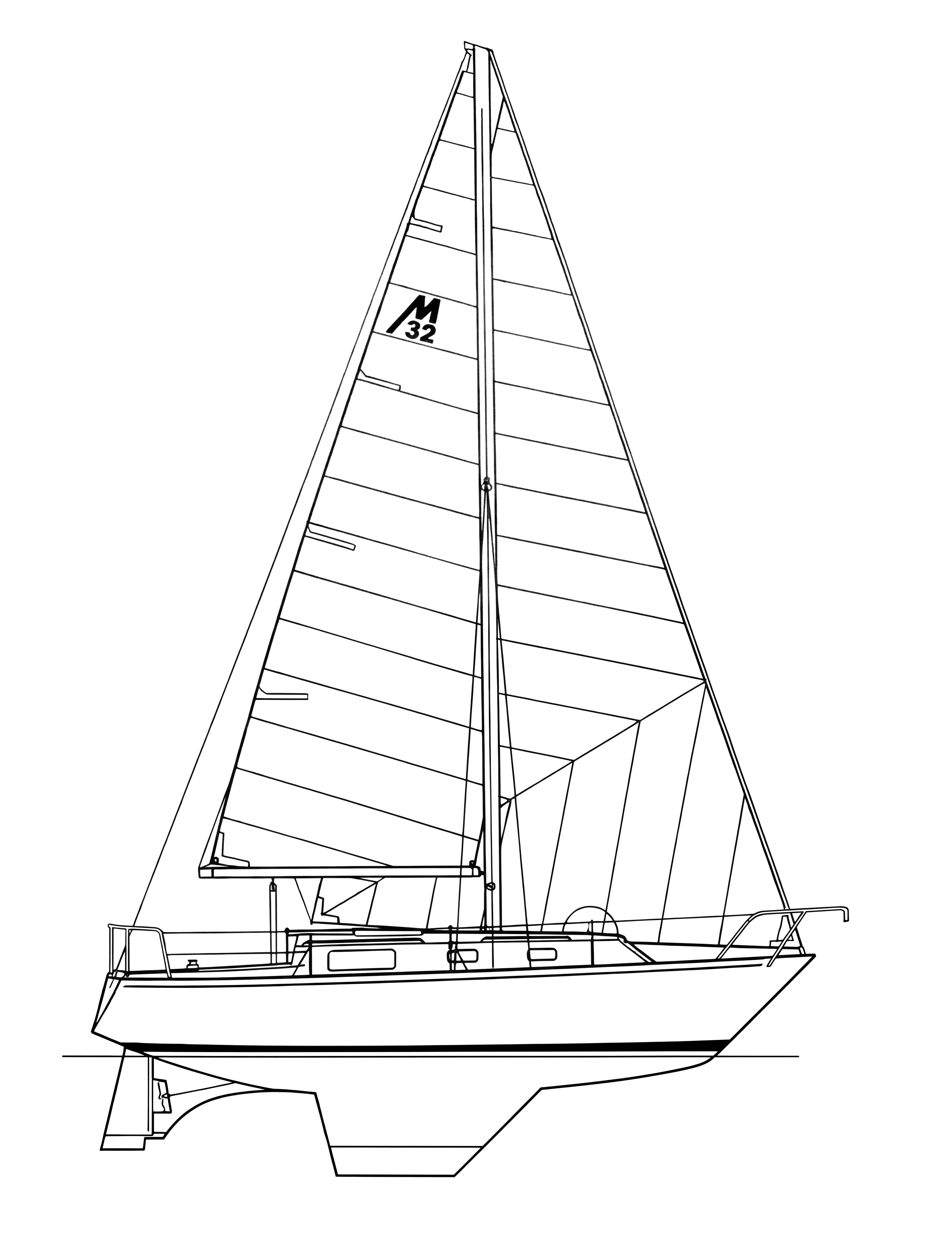
Morgan 32 side view (depicting both full and shoal keel variations)

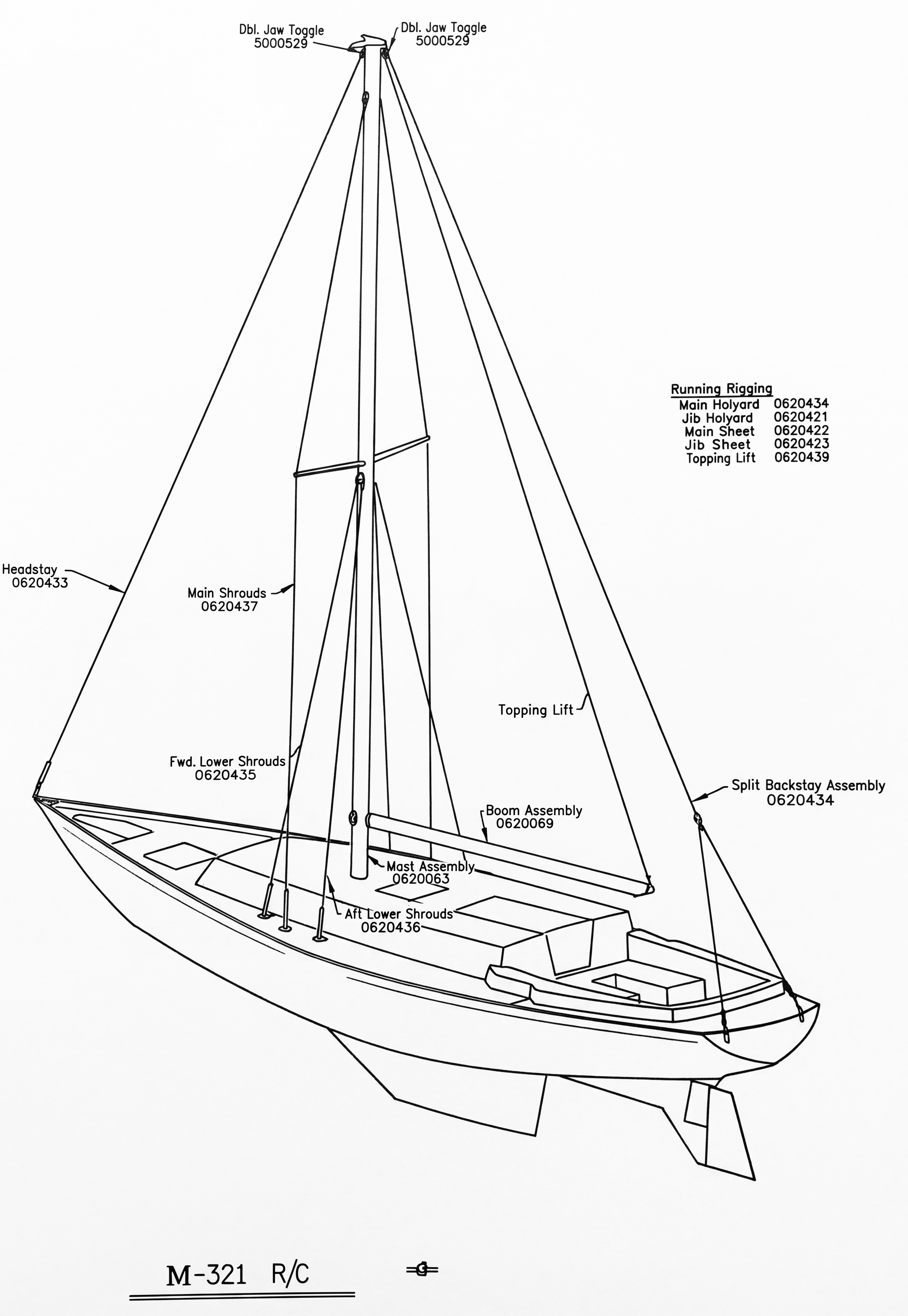
Morgan 32 rigging View

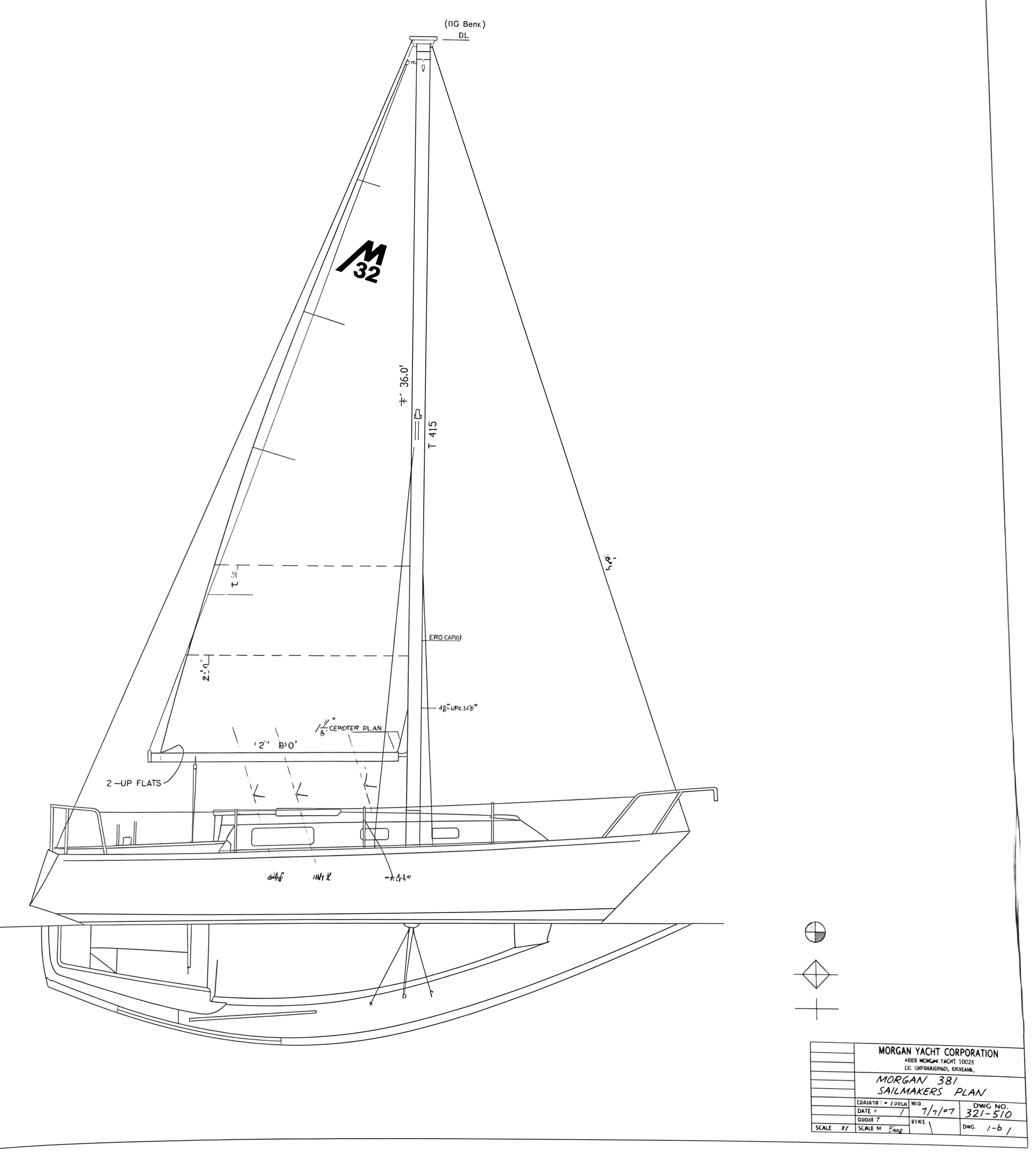
Morgan 32 sail plan

The Morgan 32 is a recreational keelboat, built predominantly of fiberglass, with wood trim. It has a masthead sloop rig with aluminum spars, a raked stem, a reverse transom, a skeg-mounted rudder controlled by a wheel and a fixed semi-fin keel (an abbreviated full keel featuring Ted Brewer's characteristic "Brewer Bite" between the fin and the prop aperture). It displaces 11,000 lb (4,990 kg) and carries 4,000 lb (1,814 kg) of lead ballast.

The Morgan 32 has a moderately shallow canoe-shaped underbody with a low aspect ratio keel and integrally attached skeg to minimize wetted surface and underwater resistance. A fine entry and relatively sharp sections forward keep the bow wave to a minimum to prevent induced pitching and minimize pounding without excessive buoyancy forward.

The narrow beam at the waterline encourages better light wind performance, while her increasingly wide beam towards the sheerline adds stability when heeled over in heavier wind.

The fullness of the aft hull section to the transom increased reserve buoyancy in order to prevent squatting and compensate for the concentration of weight caused by the machinery under the cockpit and gathered crew in the cockpit.

The boat has a draft of 5.33 ft (1.62 m) with the standard keel and 4.00 ft (1.22 m) with the optional shoal draft keel.

Earlier boats were fitted with a Japanese Yanmar 2GM20 20 hp (15 kW) diesel engine, while later boats had the Yanmar 3GM30. The fuel tank holds 27 U.S. gallons (100 L; 22 imp gal) and the fresh water tank has a capacity of 35 U.S. gallons (130 L; 29 imp gal).

The galley is located on the port side, at the bottom of the companionway stairs and features a two-burner alcohol stove and oven, a 7 cu ft (0.20 m^{3}) icebox and a single sink with foot-pumped water. The head is located forward, just aft of the bow "V"-berth. Additional sleeping accommodation is provided by settees in the main cabin and a aft double berth. One cabin quarter berth also serves as a seat for the navigation table. The cabin trim is teak with ash striping on the ceiling.

Ventilation is provided by six opening ports, plus opening hatches in the head and bow cabin. Up to three Dorade Boxes could be optionally specified when ordering.

The mainsheet is of a 6:1, mid-boom configuration and attaches at the bridge deck in early boats. Later boats moved it to the cabin top just afore the companion way, with the lines run aft to the cockpit. The cockpit has two genoa winches and the genoa has inboard tracks. There are also two halyard winches.

Original factory optional equipment included jiffy reefing, a bow anchor roller, pressure water, and premium wood finishes in the interior.

The design has a Portsmouth Yardstick racing average handicap of 86.0.

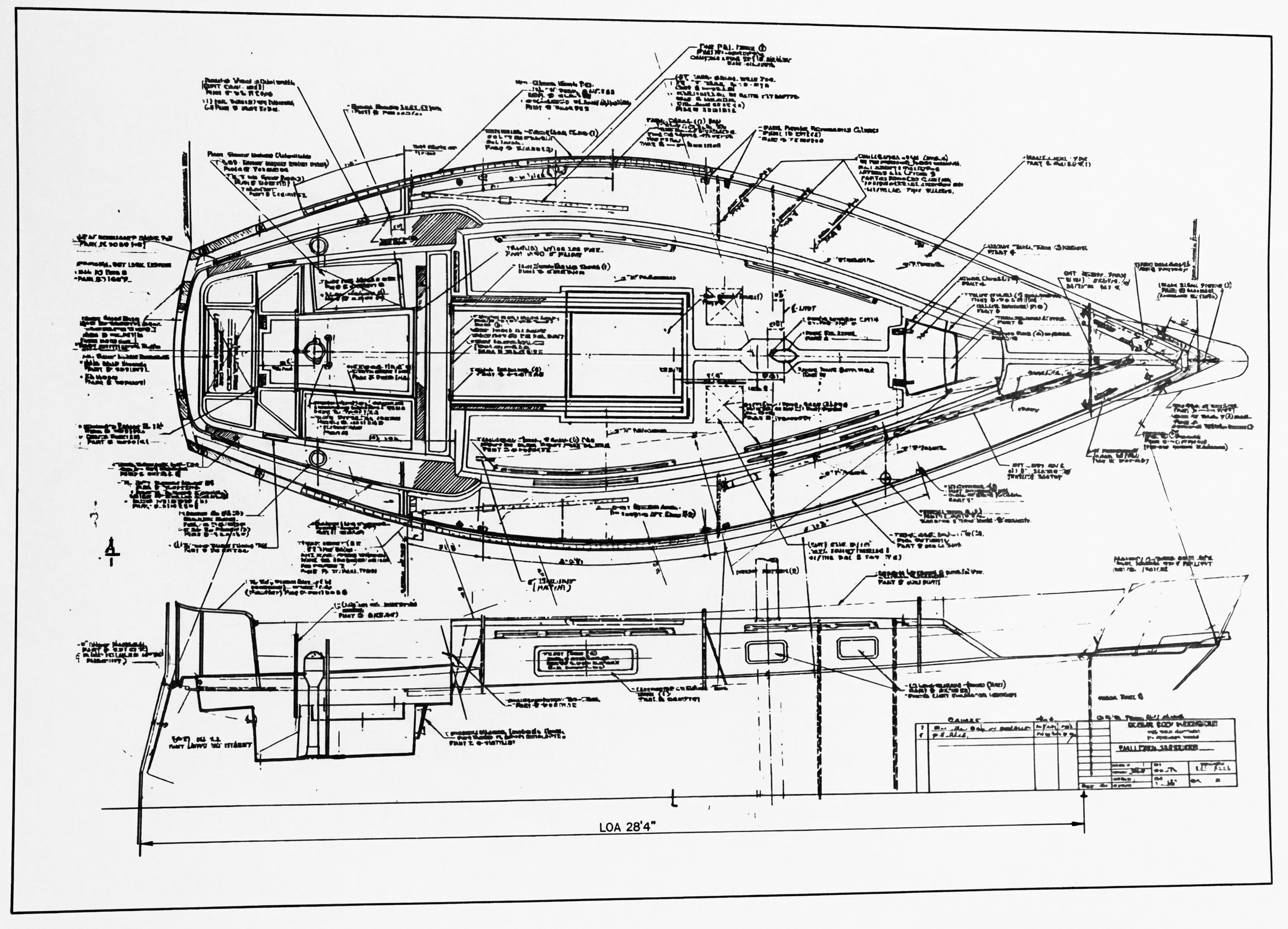
Morgan 32 line drawing

== See also ==
- List of sailing boat types

Similar sailboats

- Bayfield 30/32
- Beneteau 323
- C&C 32
- Columbia 32
- Douglas 32
- Hunter 32 Vision
- Mirage 32
- Nonsuch 324
- Ontario 32
- Ranger 32
- Watkins 32
