= J27 =

J27 may refer to:

- J/27, a keelboat
- County Route J27 (California)
- HMS Blackpool (J27), a Bangor-class minesweeper of the Royal Navy
- January 27, 2007 anti-war protest, in Washington, D.C.
- LNER Class J27, a British steam locomotive class
- Triangular orthobicupola, a Johnson solid (J_{27})
