= Ranger 32 =

American sailboat designed by Gary Mull

Development
- Designer: Gary Mull
- Location: United States
- Year: 1973
- No. built: 147
- Builder: Ranger Yachts
- Name: Ranger 32

Boat
- Displacement: 9,500 lb (4,309 kg)
- Draft: 5.25 ft (1.60 m)

Hull
- Type: Monohull
- Construction: Fiberglass
- LOA: 32.5 ft (9.9 m)
- LWL: 25.83 ft (7.87 m)
- Beam: 10.83 ft (3.30 m)
- Engine: Universal Atomic 4 gasoline motor 30 hp (22 kW)

Hull appendages
- Keel: fin keel
- Ballast: 4,480 lb (2,032 kg)
- Rudder: rudder mounted on a skeg

Rig
- General: Masthead sloop
- I foretriangle height: 40.90 ft (12.47 m)
- J foretriangle base: 13.25 ft (4.04 m)
- P mainsail luff: 3,650 ft (1,110 m)
- E mainsail foot: 9.67 ft (2.95 m)

Sails
- Mainsail area: 176.48 sq ft (16.396 m^{2})
- Jib/genoa area: 270.96 sq ft (25.173 m^{2})
- Total sail area: 447.44 sq ft (41.569 m^{2})

Racing
- PHRF: 162 (average)

The Ranger 32 is an American sailboat that was designed by Gary Mull as an International Offshore Rule Three-Quarter Ton class racer and first built in 1973. The design is out of production.

The Ranger 32 is a development of Swampfire, the winner of the first 3/4 ton cup championship held at Miami in 1974.

== Production ==
The boat was built by Ranger Yachts in the United States, starting in 1973, with 147 boats completed.

== Design ==
The Ranger 32 is a small recreational keelboat, built predominantly of fiberglass, with wood trim. It has a fractional sloop masthead sloop rig, a rudder mounted on a skeg and a fixed fin keel. It displaces 9,500 lb (4,309 kg) and carries 4,480 lb (2,032 kg) of lead ballast. The boat has a draft of 5.25 ft (1.60 m) with the standard keel.

The boat is fitted with a Universal Atomic 4 gasoline motor of 30 hp (22 kW).

The design has sleeping accommodation for four people, with a double "V"-berth in the bow cabin and two straight settees in the main cabin. The galley is located on the port side just forward of the companionway ladder. The galley is L-shaped and is equipped with a two-burner stove, ice box and a sink. A navigation station is opposite the galley, on the starboard side. The head is located just aft of the bow cabin on the port side and includes a shower.

The boat has a PHRF racing average handicap of 162 with a high of 172 and low of 156. It has a hull speed of 6.81 kn (12.61 km/h).

== Operational history ==
Dennis Conner, three times America's Cup winner, trained for those high level races on boats that he owned, including his Ranger 32, sailed before his first win in 1980.

The 1980 San Diego Yachting Cup Half Ton class was won by a Ranger 32, Skoom captained by Mike Busch.

== See also ==
- List of sailing boat types

Similar sailboats

- Aloha 32
- Bayfield 30/32
- Beneteau 323
- C&C 32
- Columbia 32
- Contest 32 CS
- Douglas 32
- Hunter 32 Vision
- Hunter 326
- Mirage 32
- Morgan 32
- Nonsuch 324
- Ontario 32
- Watkins 32
