= Nonsuch 324 =

Sailboat class

Development
- Designer: Mark Ellis Design
- Location: Canada
- Year: 1994
- Builder: Hinterhoeller Yachts
- Name: Nonsuch 324

Boat
- Displacement: 11,500 lb (5,216 kg)
- Draft: 4.33 ft (1.32 m)

Hull
- Type: Monohull
- Construction: Fiberglass
- LOA: 32.33 ft (9.85 m)
- LWL: 28.75 ft (8.76 m)
- Beam: 11.83 ft (3.61 m)
- Engine: Yanmar 27 hp (20 kW) diesel engine

Hull appendages
- Keel: wing keel
- Ballast: 4,240 lb (1,923 kg)
- Rudder: internally-mounted spade-type rudder

Rig
- Rig type: Cat rigged

Sails
- Sailplan: Catboat
- Mainsail area: 689 sq ft (64.0 m^{2})
- Total sail area: 689 sq ft (64.0 m^{2})

Racing
- PHRF: 174 (average)

The Nonsuch 324 is a Canadian sailboat, that was designed by Mark Ellis Design and first built in 1994. It was the last of the series of Nonsuch sailboats built.

The Nonsuch 324 is a development of the Nonsuch 30, with the same hull design, but a taller rig, more sail area, a carbon fibre wishbone boom and a shallow-draft wing keel.

== Production ==
The design was built by Hinterhoeller Yachts in St. Catharines, Ontario, Canada, but only a small number were completed before production ended.

== Design ==
The Nonsuch 324 is a small recreational keelboat, built predominantly of fiberglass. It has a cat rig, an unstayed mast with a carbon fibre wishbone boom, a plumb stem, a vertical transom, an internally-mounted spade-type rudder controlled by a wheel and a fixed wing keel. It displaces 11,500 lb (5,216 kg) and carries 4,240 lb (1,923 kg) of ballast.

The boat has a draft of 4.33 ft (1.32 m) with the standard wing keel.

The boat is fitted with a Japanese Yanmar diesel engine of 27 hp (20 kW). The fuel tank holds 25 U.S. gallons (95 L; 21 imp gal) and the fresh water tank has a capacity of 105 U.S. gallons (400 L; 87 imp gal).

The design has a PHRF racing average handicap of 175 and a hull speed of 7.18 kn (13.30 km/h).

== See also ==
- List of sailing boat types

Related development

- Nonsuch 30

Similar sailboats

- Aloha 32
- Bayfield 30/32
- Beneteau 31
- Beneteau 323
- C&C 32
- Columbia 32
- Contest 32 CS
- Douglas 32
- Hunter 32 Vision
- Hunter 326
- Mirage 32
- Morgan 32
- Ontario 32
- Ranger 32
- Watkins 32
