= Ontario 32 =

Sailboat class

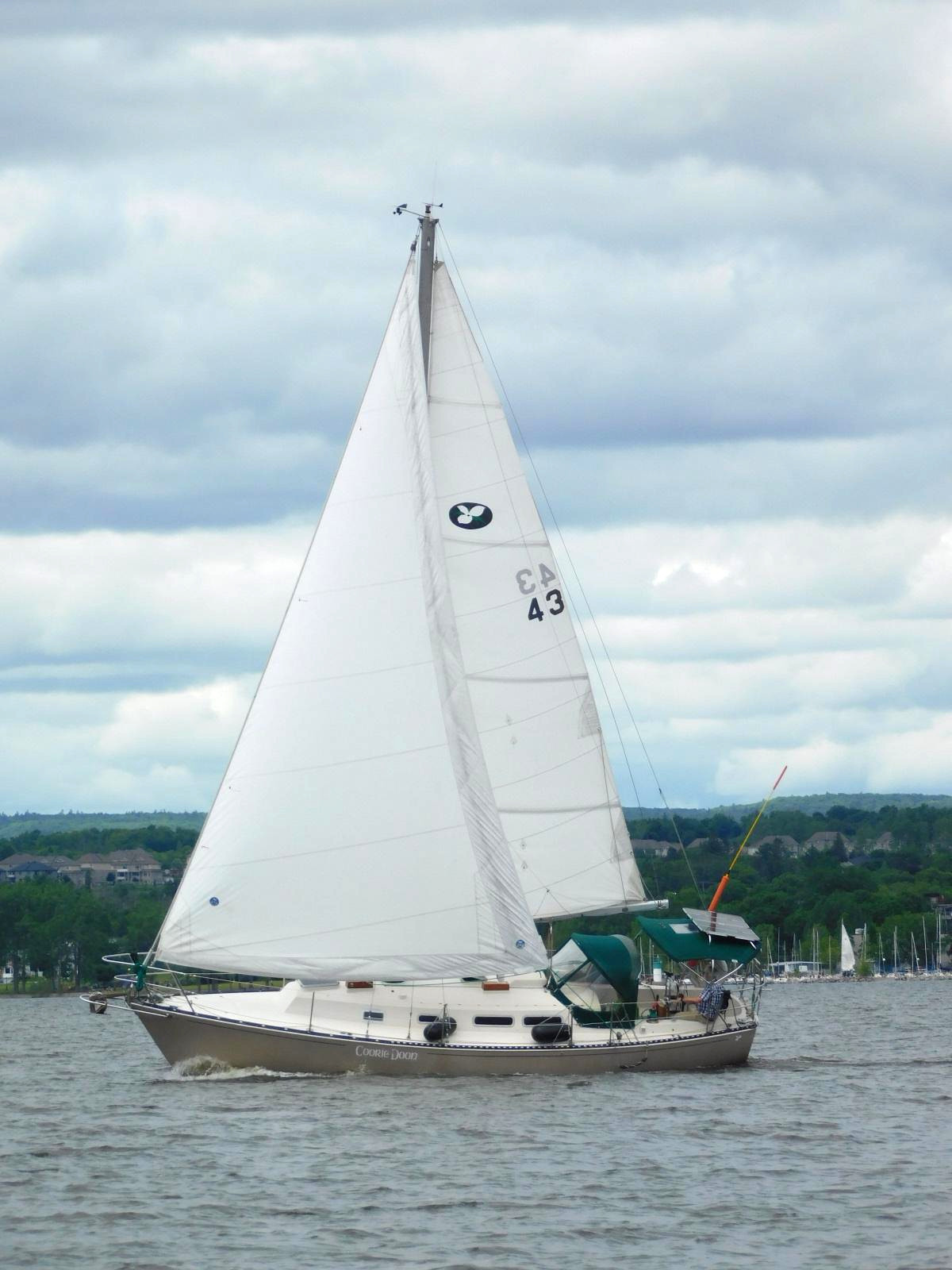

Development
- Designer: C&C Design
- Location: Canada
- Year: 1974
- No. built: 160
- Builder: Ontario Yachts
- Name: Ontario 32

Boat
- Displacement: 9,800 lb (4,445 kg)
- Draft: 4.50 ft (1.37 m)

Hull
- Type: Monohull
- Construction: Fiberglass
- LOA: 32.00 ft (9.75 m)
- LWL: 26.50 ft (8.08 m)
- Beam: 11.00 ft (3.35 m)
- Engine: Yanmar 15 hp (11 kW) diesel engine

Hull appendages
- Keel: long fin keel
- Ballast: 3,977 lb (1,804 kg)
- Rudder: internally-mounted spade-type rudder

Rig
- Rig type: Bermuda rig
- I foretriangle height: 40.00 ft (12.19 m)
- J foretriangle base: 13.00 ft (3.96 m)
- P mainsail luff: 34.00 ft (10.36 m)
- E mainsail foot: 13.00 ft (3.96 m)

Sails
- Sailplan: Masthead sloop
- Mainsail area: 221.00 sq ft (20.532 m^{2})
- Jib/genoa area: 260.00 sq ft (24.155 m^{2})
- Total sail area: 481.00 sq ft (44.686 m^{2})

Racing
- PHRF: 177 (Tall mast version, average)

The Ontario 32 is a Canadian sailboat, that was designed by C&C Design and first built in 1974.

== Production ==
The design was built by Ontario Yachts in Canada, between 1974 and 1986, with a total of 160 boats completed during its production run. The design is now out of production.

== Design ==
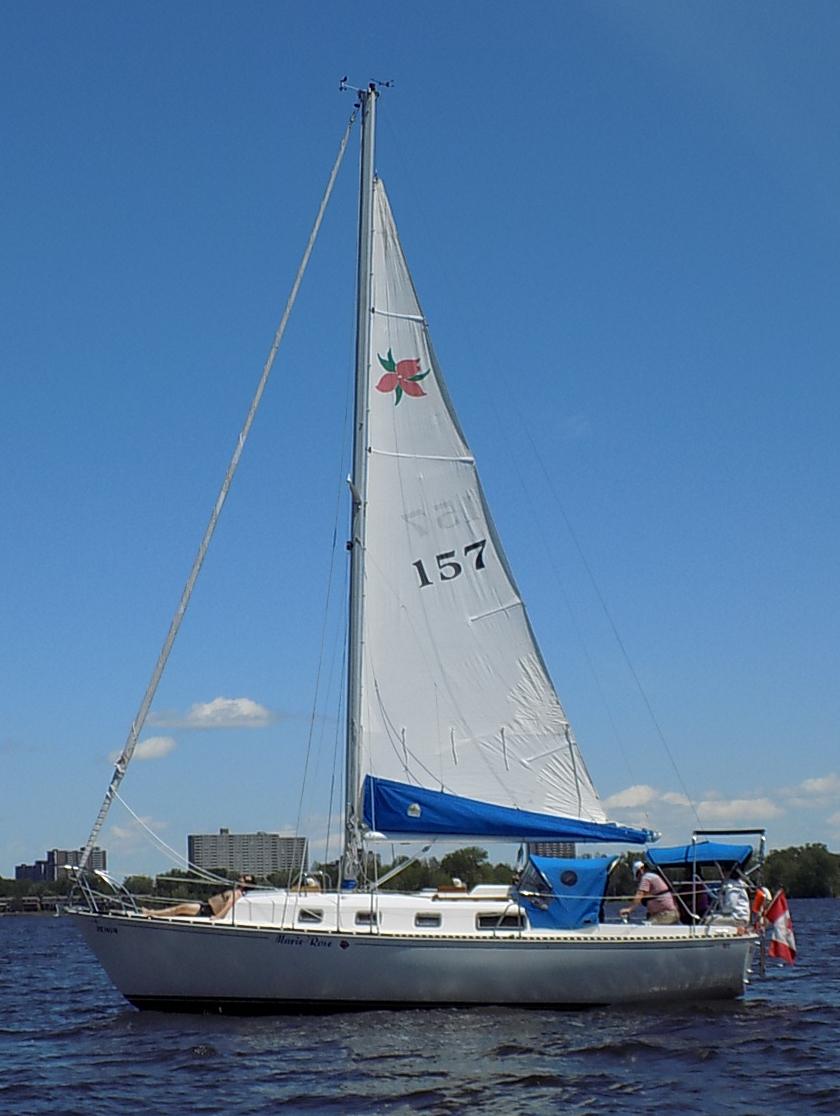
Ontario 32

The Ontario 32 is a recreational keelboat, built predominantly of fiberglass, with wood trim. It has a masthead sloop rig, a raked stem, a square transom, an internally-mounted spade-type rudder controlled by a wheel and a fixed long fin keel. It has distinctive Dorade box ventilators. It displaces 9,800 lb (4,445 kg) and carries 3,977 lb (1,804 kg) of ballast.

The boat has a draft of 4.50 ft (1.37 m) with the standard keel fitted.

The boat is fitted with a Japanese Yanmar diesel engine of 15 hp (11 kW). The fuel tank holds 26 U.S. gallons (98 L; 22 imp gal) and the fresh water tank has a capacity of 66 U.S. gallons (250 L; 55 imp gal).

A tall mast version was also produced, with a mast about 2.0 ft (0.61 m) higher than standard.

The tall mast version has a PHRF racing average handicap of 177 with a high of 185 and low of 176. It has a hull speed of 6.9 kn (12.78 km/h).

== Operational history ==
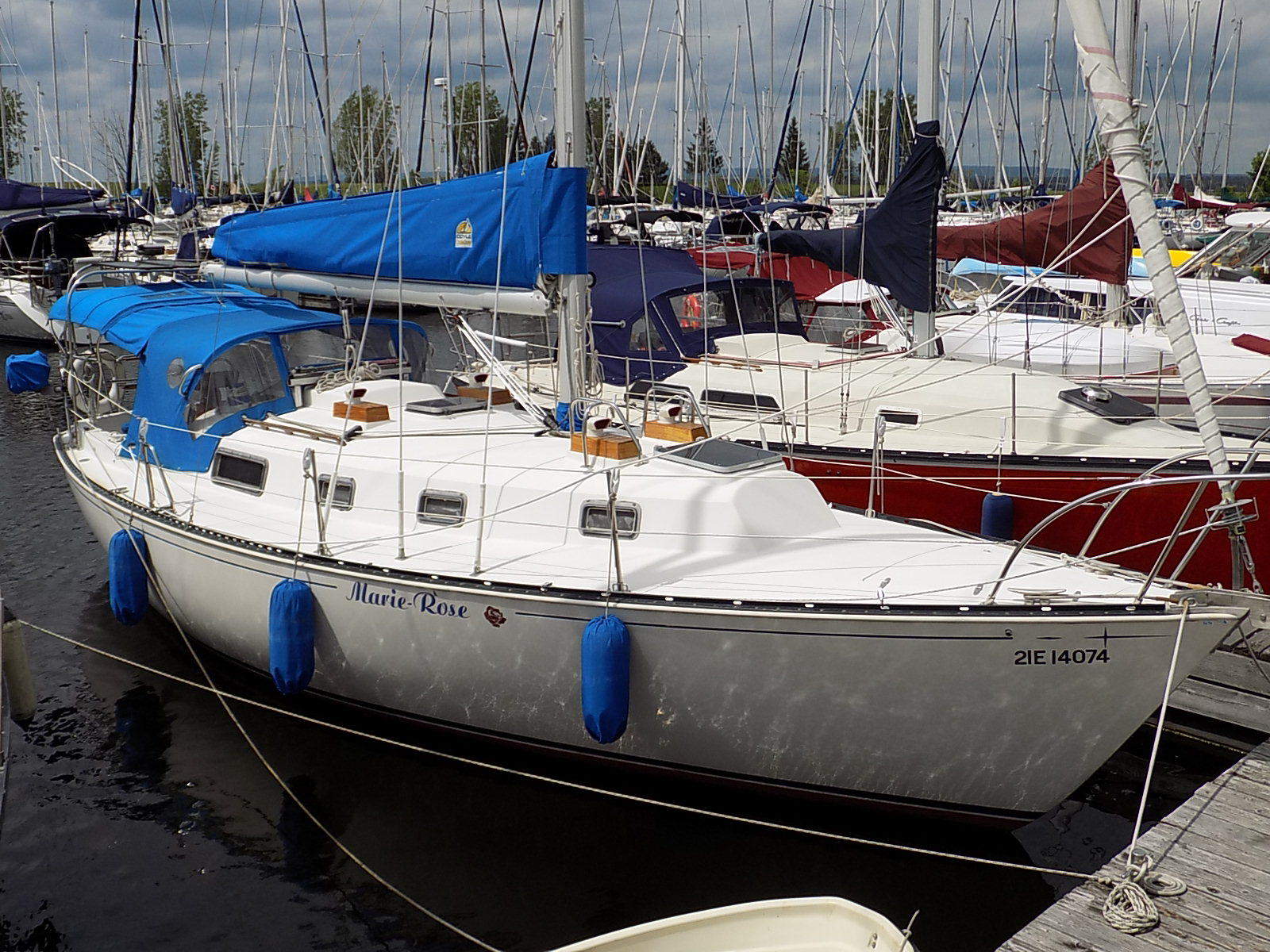
Ontario 32

In a review Michael McGoldrick wrote, "The Ontario 32 is a no-nonsense cruising boat with respectable performance, and it remains in high demand...The Ontario 32's popularity is in large part due to the fact that Ontario Yachts built these boats to very high standards and included many sought-after cruising features including, for example, dorade boxes for added ventilation, three burner stove with an oven, shoal draft, large chart table, 6' 4" of headroom"

== See also ==
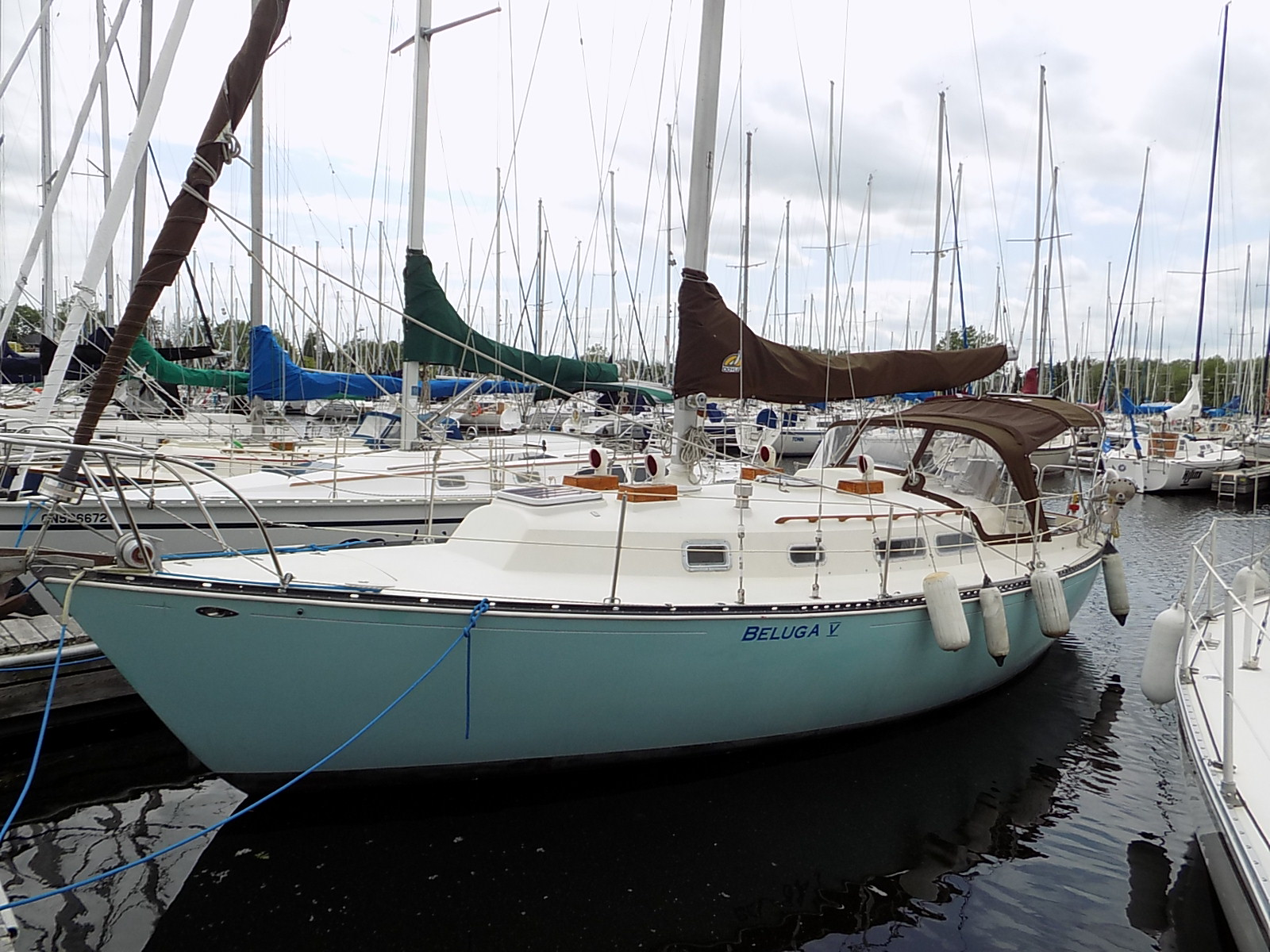
Ontario 32

- List of sailing boat types

Similar sailboats

- Aloha 32
- Bayfield 30/32
- Beneteau 323
- C&C 32
- Columbia 32
- Contest 32 CS
- Douglas 32
- Hunter 32 Vision
- Hunter 326
- Mirage 32
- Morgan 32
- Nonsuch 324
- Ranger 32
- Watkins 32
