= Hunter 32 Vision =

Sailboat class

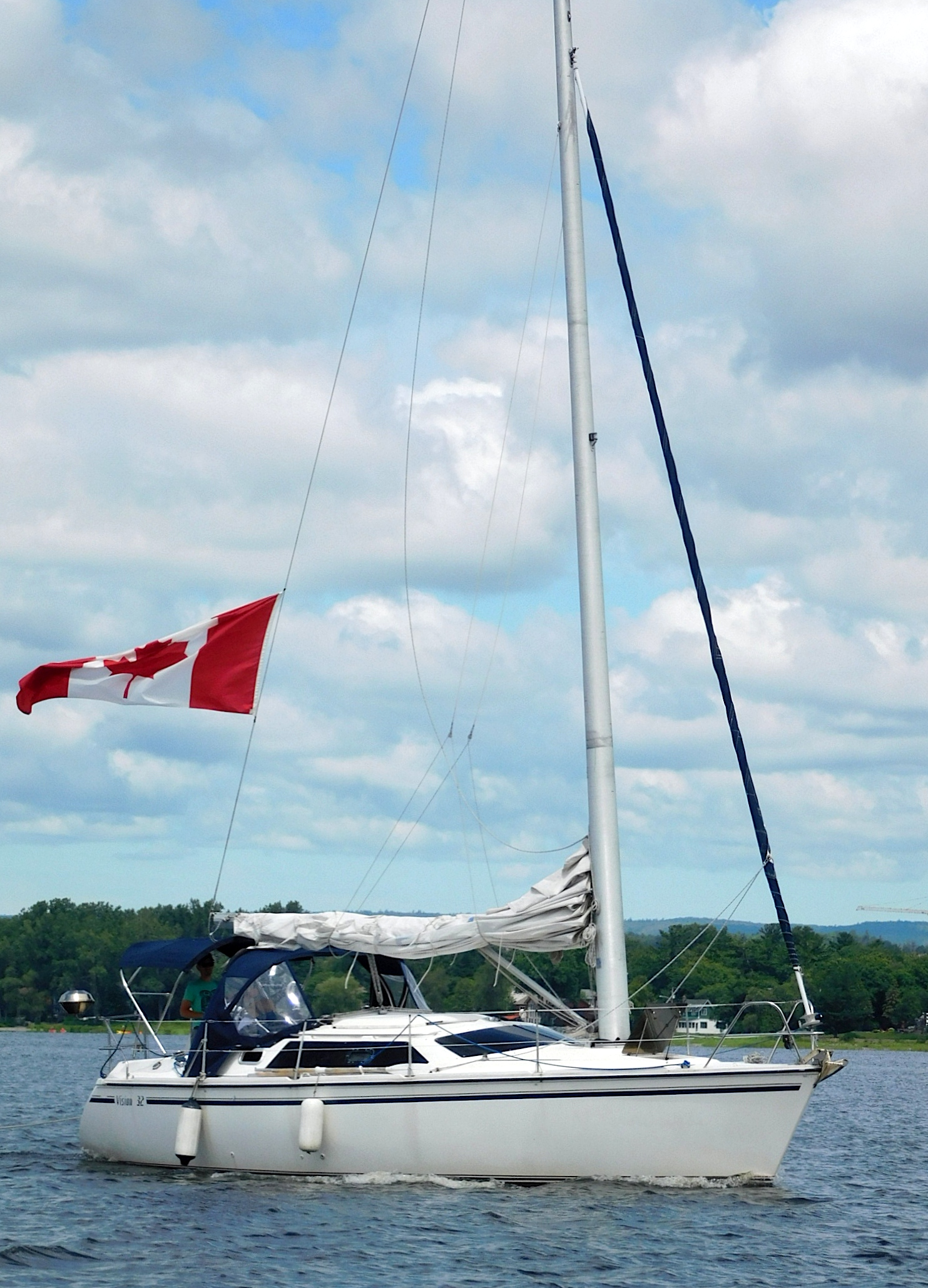

Development
- Location: United States
- Year: 1988
- Builder: Hunter Marine
- Name: Hunter 32 Vision

Boat
- Displacement: 11,400 lb (5,171 kg)
- Draft: 4.25 ft (1.30 m)

Hull
- Type: Monohull
- Construction: Fiberglass
- LOA: 32.00 ft (9.75 m)
- LWL: 27.00 ft (8.23 m)
- Beam: 11.33 ft (3.45 m)
- Engine: Yanmar 3GM diesel engine 27 hp (20 kW)

Hull appendages
- Keel: fin keel
- Ballast: 4,500 lb (2,041 kg)
- Rudder: internally-mounted spade-type rudder

Rig
- General: Fractional rigged sloop
- I foretriangle height: 33.00 ft (10.06 m)
- J foretriangle base: 8.25 ft (2.51 m)
- P mainsail luff: 43.75 ft (13.34 m)
- E mainsail foot: 16.00 ft (4.88 m)

Sails
- Mainsail area: 350 sq ft (33 m^{2})
- Jib/genoa area: 136.13 sq ft (12.647 m^{2})
- Total sail area: 486.13 sq ft (45.163 m^{2})

Racing
- PHRF: 177 (average)

The Hunter 32 Vision is an American sailboat, that was introduced in 1988.

== Production ==
The design was built by Hunter Marine in the United States between 1988 and 1994. The design is out of production.

== Design ==
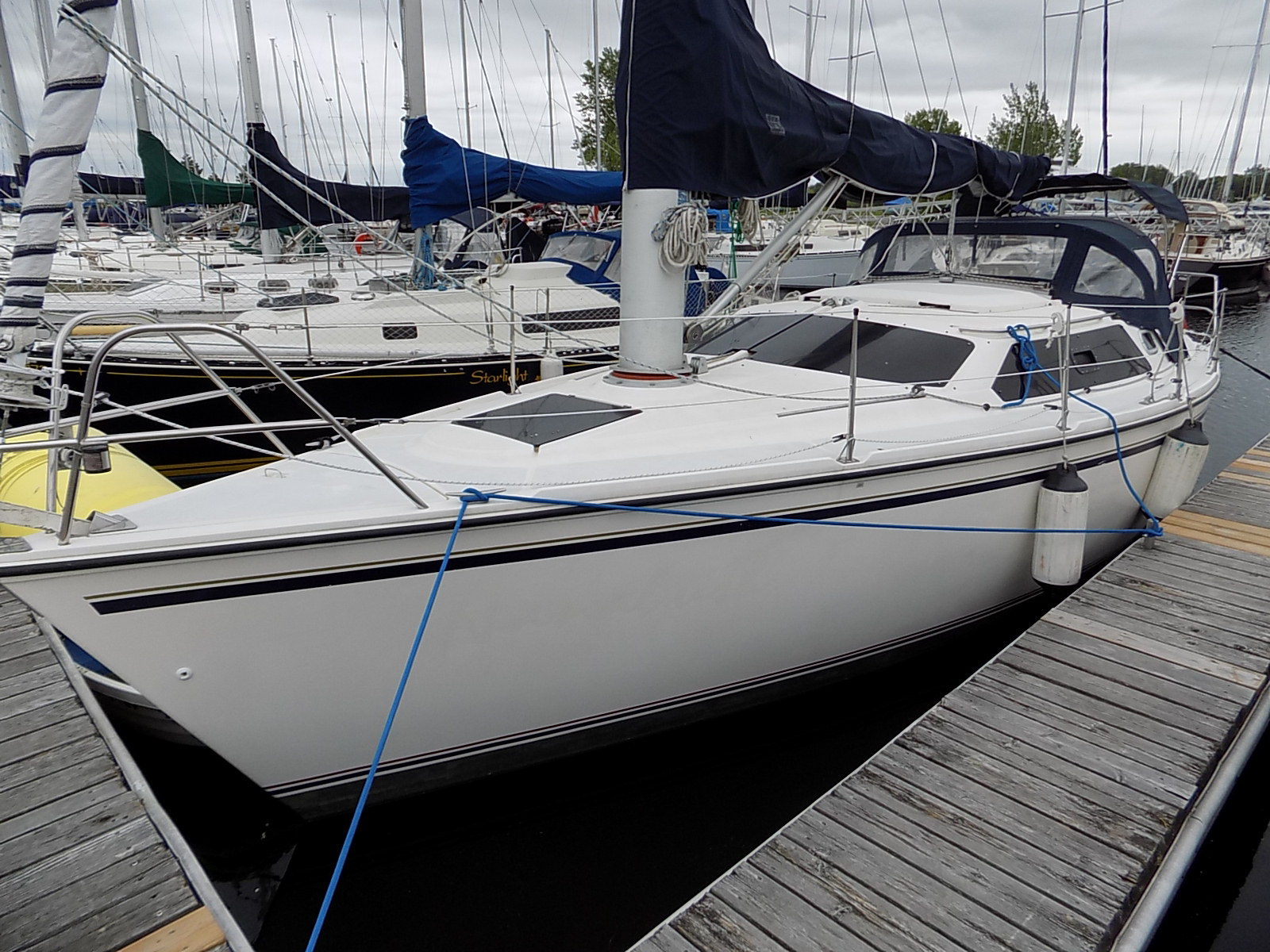
Hunter 32 Vision

The Hunter 32 Vision is a small recreational keelboat, built predominantly of fiberglass. It has a free-standing fractional sloop rig, an internally-mounted spade-type rudder and a fixed fin keel. It displaces 11,400 lb (5,171 kg) and carries 4,500 lb (2,041 kg) of ballast.

The boat has a draft of 4.25 ft (1.30 m) with the standard wing keel.

The boat is fitted with a Japanese Yanmar 3GM diesel engine of 27 hp (20 kW). The fuel tank holds 22 U.S. gallons (83 L; 18 imp gal) and the fresh water tank has a capacity of 45 U.S. gallons (170 L; 37 imp gal).

The boat has a PHRF racing average handicap of 177 with a high of 192 and low of 165. It has a hull speed of 6.96 kn (12.89 km/h).

== See also ==
- List of sailing boat types

Related development

- Hunter 36 Vision

Similar sailboats

- Aloha 32
- Bayfield 30/32
- Beneteau 323
- C&C 32
- Catalina 320
- Columbia 32
- Contest 32 CS
- Douglas 32
- Hunter 326
- Mirage 32
- Morgan 32
- Nonsuch 324
- Ontario 32
- Ranger 32
- Watkins 32
