= Beneteau 323 =

Sailboat class

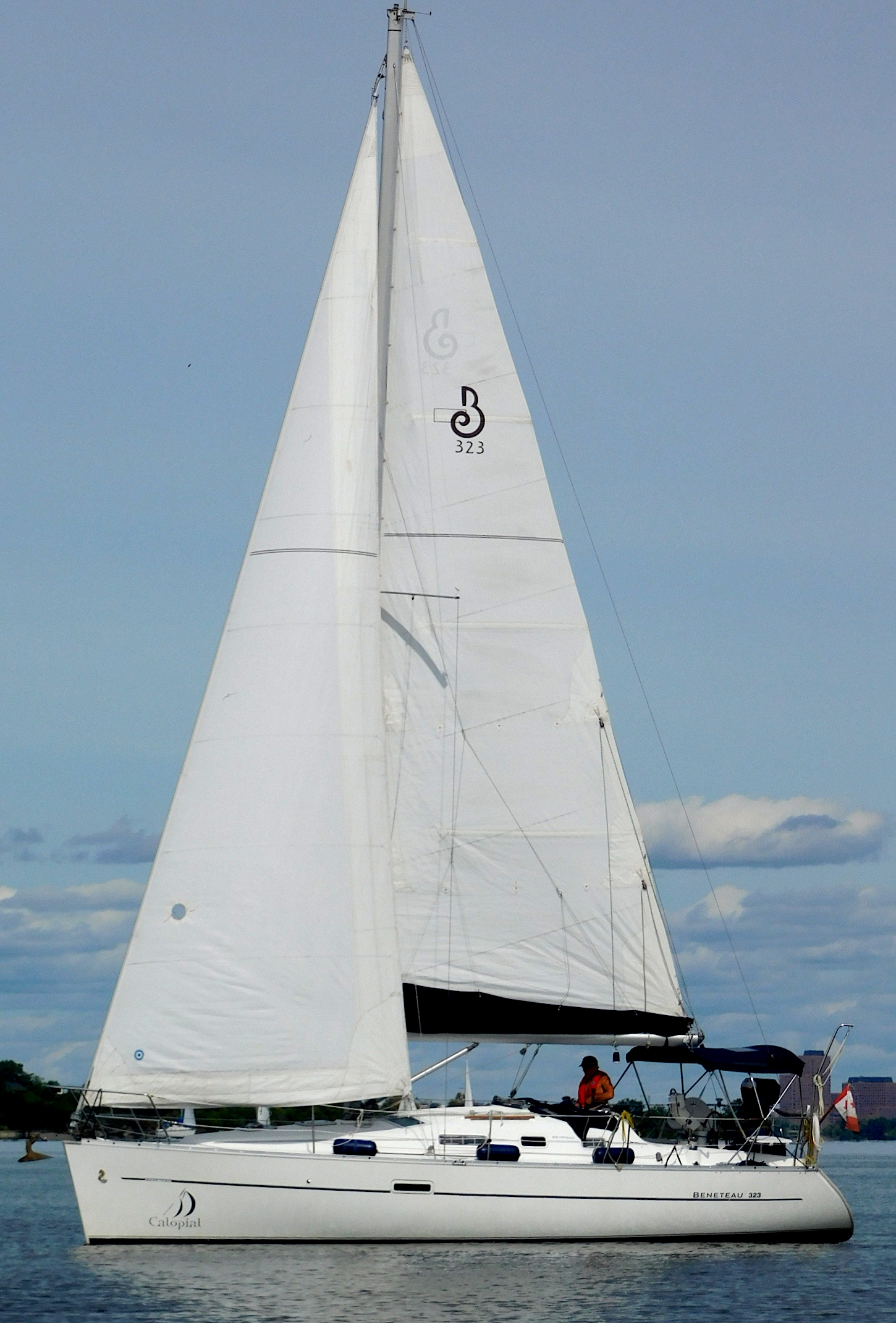

Development
- Designer: Group Finot
- Location: France
- Year: 2003
- Builder: Beneteau
- Name: Beneteau 323

Boat
- Displacement: 9,325 lb (4,230 kg)
- Draft: 4.75 ft (1.45 m)

Hull
- Type: Monohull
- Construction: Fiberglass
- LOA: 32.83 ft (10.01 m)
- LWL: 29.18 ft (8.89 m)
- Beam: 10.75 ft (3.28 m)
- Engine: 22 hp (16 kW) diesel engine

Hull appendages
- Keel: fin keel
- Ballast: 2,414 lb (1,095 kg)
- Rudder: internally-mounted spade-type rudder

Rig
- Rig type: Bermuda rig
- I foretriangle height: 42.67 ft (13.01 m)
- J foretriangle base: 11.06 ft (3.37 m)
- P mainsail luff: 38.91 ft (11.86 m)
- E mainsail foot: 13.71 ft (4.18 m)

Sails
- Sailplan: Masthead sloop
- Mainsail area: 256.22 sq ft (23.804 m^{2})
- Jib/genoa area: 235.97 sq ft (21.922 m^{2})
- Total sail area: 542.00 sq ft (50.353 m^{2})

The Beneteau 323 is a French sailboat that was designed by Jean Marie Finot and Pascal Conq of Group Finot/Conq and first built in 2001.

The Beneteau 323 was also marketed as the Beneteau Oceanis 323, as well as the Beneteau Oceanis Clipper 323 and a version was sold as the Moorings 32.2.

The design was named Boat of the Year at the 2004 Oslo Boat Show.

== Production ==
The design was built by Beneteau in France from 2003 until 2007, but it is now out of production.

== Design ==
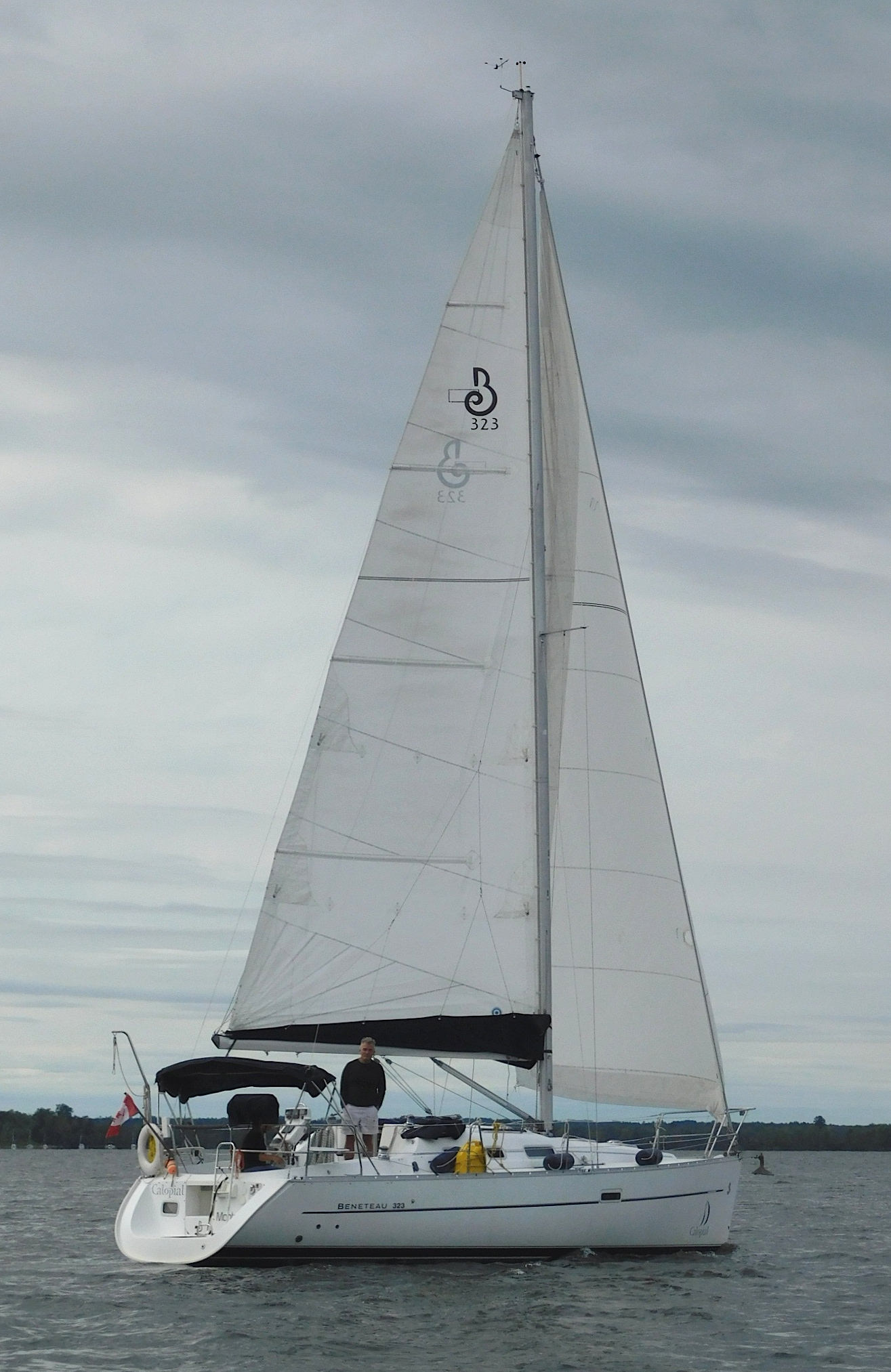
Beneteau 323 showing the walk-through transom

The Beneteau 323 is a recreational keelboat, built predominantly of fibreglass. The hull is single skin polyester fiberglass, while the deck is a polyester fibreglass and balsa sandwich. It has a masthead sloop rig with a deck-stepped mast and aluminium spars, a nearly plumb stem, a rounded reverse transom with a walk-through swimming platform, an internally mounted spade-type rudder controlled by a wheel. Optionally it was built with a fixed fin (shoal draft) keel, deep draft keel or stub keel with a centreboard combination.

The boat is fitted with an inboard diesel engine of 18 to 22 hp (13 to 16 kW). The fuel tank holds 17 U.S. gallons (64 L; 14 imp gal) and the fresh water tank has a capacity of 22 U.S. gallons (83 L; 18 imp gal).

The design has sleeping accommodation for four people, with a double "V"-berth berth in the bow cabin, two straight settees in the main cabin around a table and an aft cabin with a double berth on the port side. The galley is located on the port side at the companionway ladder. The galley is C-shaped and is equipped with a four-burner stove, an icebox and a double sink. A navigation station is opposite the galley, on the starboard side. The head is located aft on the starboard side and includes a shower.

The hull speed is 7.24 kn (13.41 km/h).

== Variants ==
Fin keel (shoal draft)
This model has a draft of 4.8 ft (1.5 m), displaces 9,568 lb (4,340 kg) and carries 2,414 lb (1,095 kg) of cast iron ballast.
Deep draft
This model has a draft of 5.92 ft (1.80 m), displaces 9,326 lb (4,230 kg) and carries 2,178 lb (988 kg) of cast iron ballast.
Centerboard and stub keel
This model has a draft of 2.58 ft (0.79 m) with the centreboard retracted and 6.58 ft (2.01 m) with the centreboard extended. It displaces 9,568 lb (4,340 kg) and carries 2,414 lb (1,095 kg) of cast iron ballast.

== Operational history ==
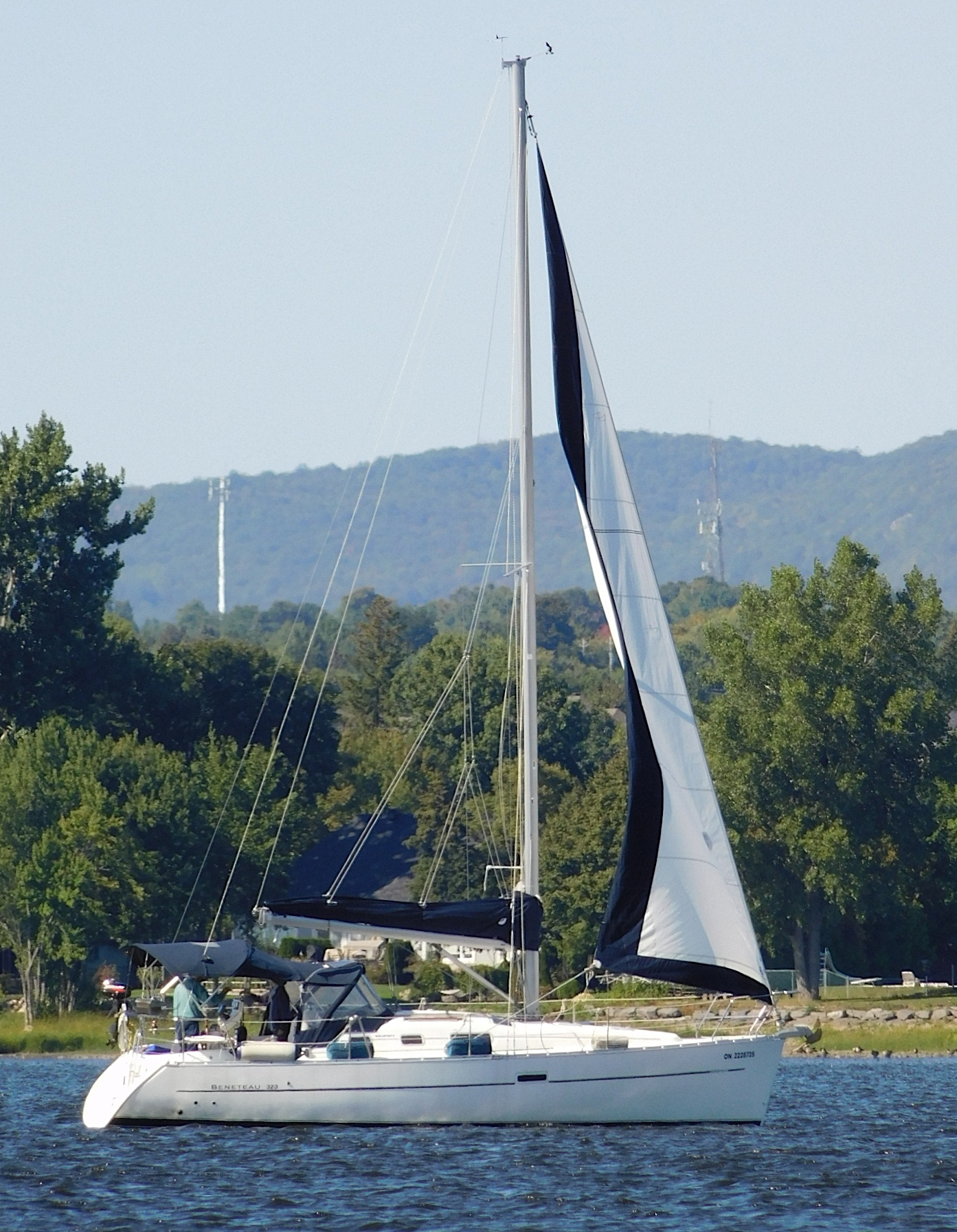
Beneteau 323

In a 2010 review Heather Holm described the design, "the Beneteau 323 is a fast, responsive and comfortable coastal cruiser. With an LOA of 32’10” (10m) and LWL of 29’2″, she has “long legs” that can take you where you want to go. She can easily be sailed single-handed."

A boat US review by naval architect Jack Hornor, described the boat in 2014: "the sailing performance of the Beneteau 323 is a bit of a mixed blessing. By my calculations, sail area/displacement ratio is 19.6 and displacement/length ratio is 168. With these numbers it is not surprising that the 323 is an excellent light air performer. On the other hand, the ballast is only 26% of total displacement and even though the VCG (vertical center of gravity) is lowered with the modified-bulb keel, it not surprising that she is also reported to be a bit tender. Her broad beam and wide transom make it more important that she be sailed flat - like the big dinghy she resembles."

A 2015 review by Rupert Holmes in Boats.com, said, "In many ways the Beneteau Oceanis 323 set new standards for 32ft cruising yachts when it was first launched in 2004. A combination of higher freeboard, allied to a wide beam that’s carried well aft and a stepped coachroof produced a boat with significantly more volume than earlier designs of this size. At the same time, an efficient deep keel option was offered, which helped to make the boat one that could be expected to take offshore passages in its stride."

== See also ==
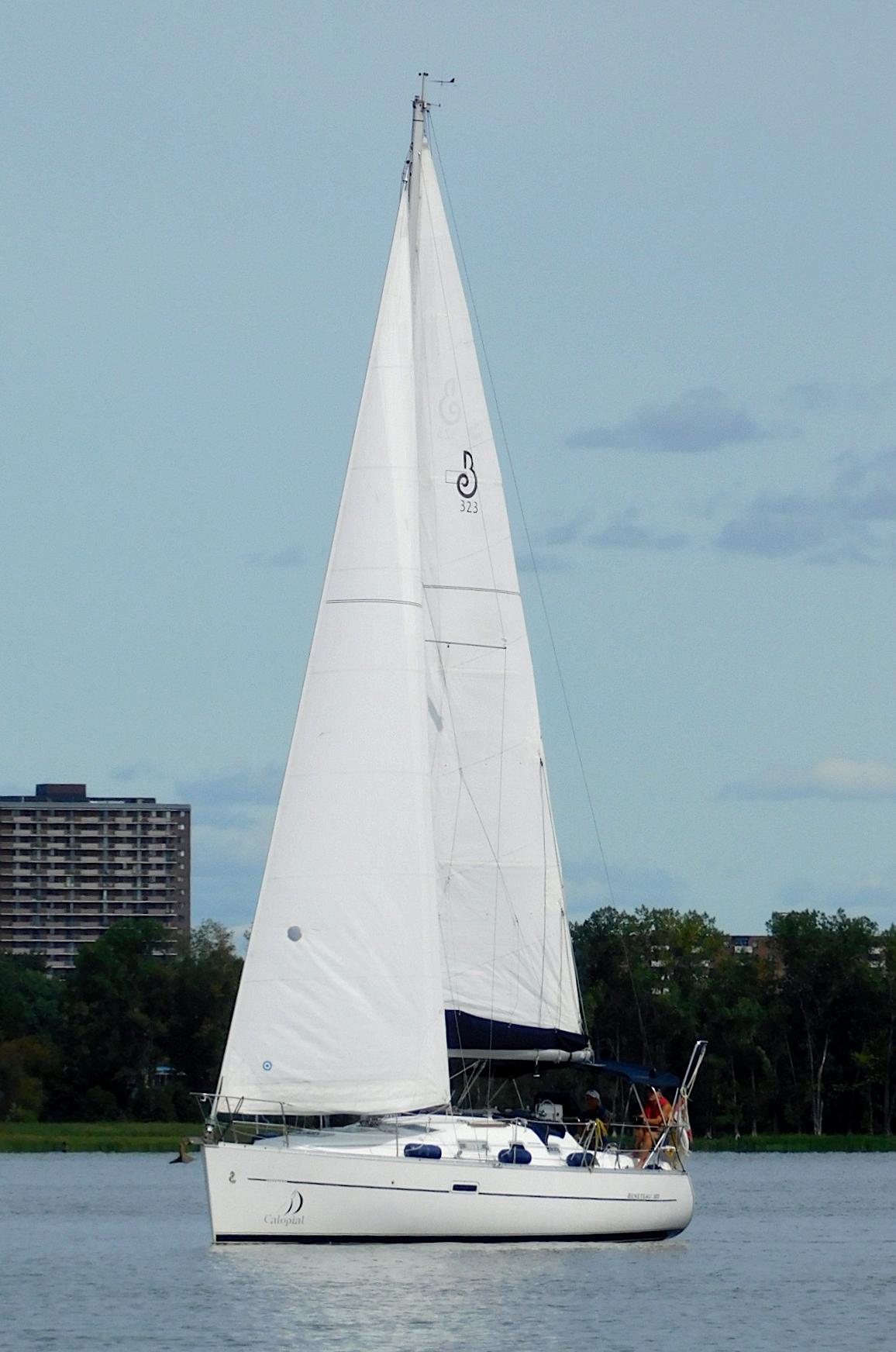
Beneteau 323

- List of sailing boat types

Similar sailboats

- Aloha 32
- Bayfield 30/32
- C&C 32
- Columbia 32
- Contest 32 CS
- Hunter 32 Vision
- Hunter 326
- Mirage 32
- Morgan 32
- Ontario 32
- Nonsuch 324
- Ranger 32
- Watkins 32
