= Mirage 32 =

Sailboat class

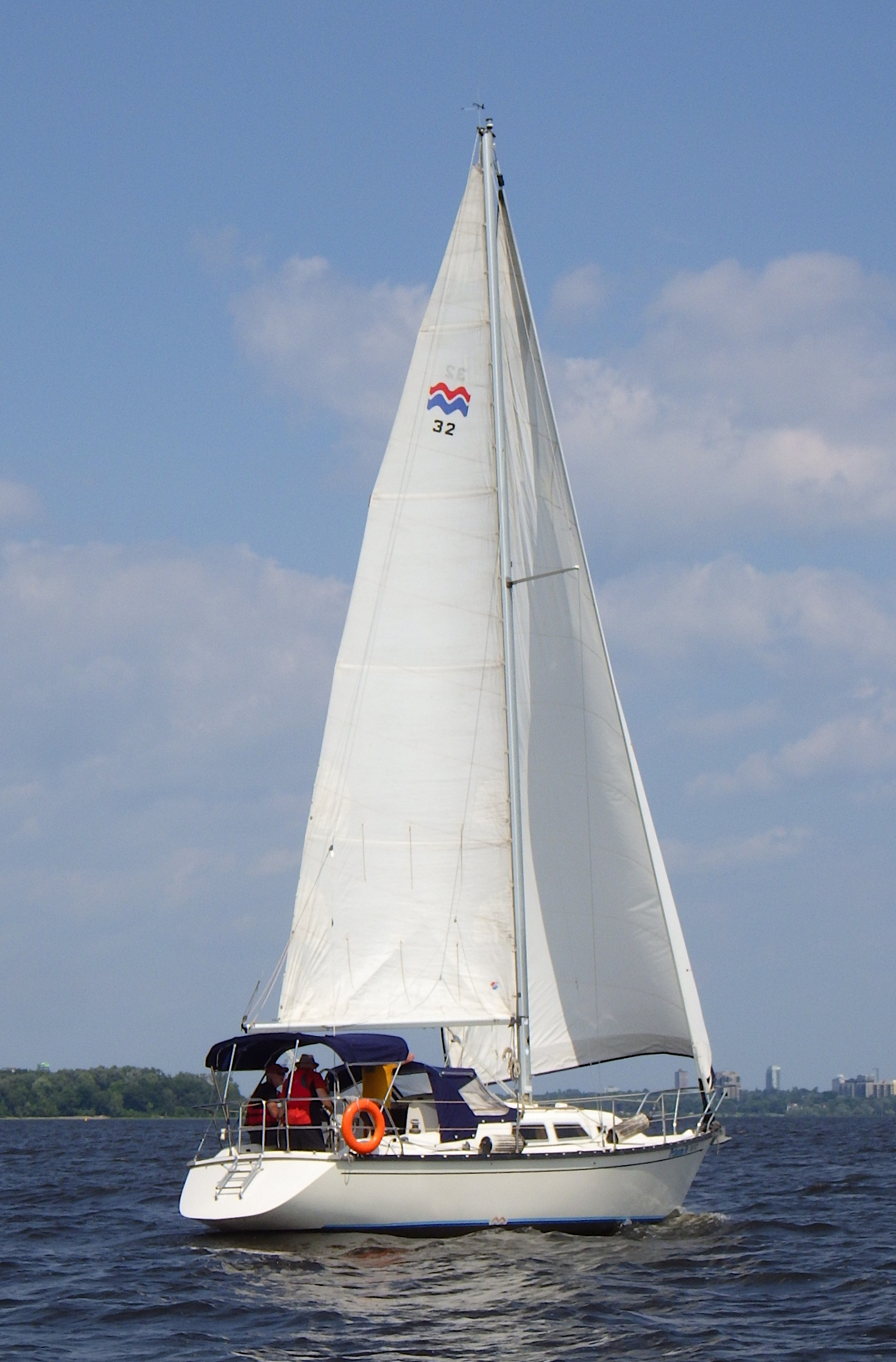

Development
- Designer: Robert Perry
- Location: Canada
- Year: 1987
- Builder: Mirage Yachts
- Name: Mirage 32

Boat
- Displacement: 8,000 lb (3,629 kg)
- Draft: 4.83 ft (1.47 m)

Hull
- Type: Monohull
- Construction: Fiberglass
- LOA: 32.00 ft (9.75 m)
- LWL: 26.00 ft (7.92 m)
- Beam: 10.50 ft (3.20 m)

Hull appendages
- Keel: fin keel
- Ballast: 2,800 lb (1,270 kg)
- Rudder: internally-mounted spade-type rudder

Rig
- General: Masthead sloop
- I foretriangle height: 40.00 ft (12.19 m)
- J foretriangle base: 12.25 ft (3.73 m)
- P mainsail luff: 34.25 ft (10.44 m)
- E mainsail foot: 11.00 ft (3.35 m)

Sails
- Mainsail area: 188.38 sq ft (17.501 m^{2})
- Jib/genoa area: 245.00 sq ft (22.761 m^{2})
- Total sail area: 433.38 sq ft (40.262 m^{2})

Racing
- PHRF: 162 (average)

The Mirage 32 is a Canadian sailboat, that was designed by American naval architect Robert Perry and first built in 1987.

The Mirage 32 is a development of the Mirage 30, with a reverse transom added.

== Production ==
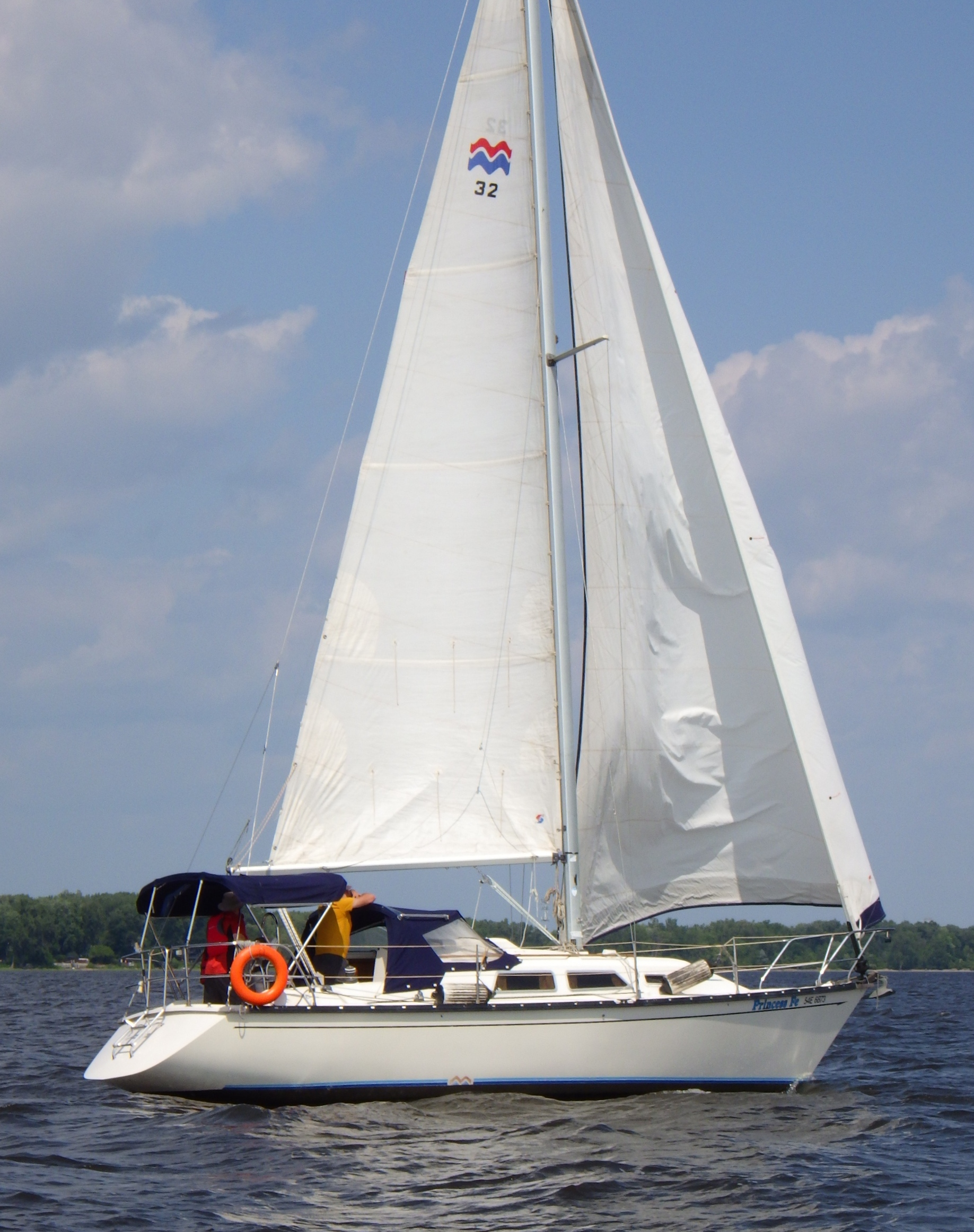
Mirage 32

The boat was built by Mirage Yachts in Canada, starting in 1987, but is now out of production.

== Design ==
The Mirage 32 is a recreational keelboat, built predominantly of fiberglass. It has a masthead sloop rig, an internally-mounted spade-type rudder and a fixed fin keel. It displaces 8,000 lb (3,629 kg) and carries 2,800 lb (1,270 kg) of ballast.

The boat has a draft of 4.83 ft (1.47 m) with the standard keel.

The boat has a PHRF racing average handicap of 162 with a high of 156 and low of 169. It has a hull speed of 6.83 kn (12.65 km/h).

== See also ==
- List of sailing boat types

Similar sailboats

- Aloha 32
- Bayfield 30/32
- Beneteau 323
- C&C 32
- Catalina 320
- Columbia 32
- Contest 32 CS
- Douglas 32
- Hunter 32 Vision
- Morgan 32
- Nonsuch 324
- Ontario 32
- Ranger 32
- Watkins 32
