= J/27 =

Keelboat built by J/Boats

- Class symbol

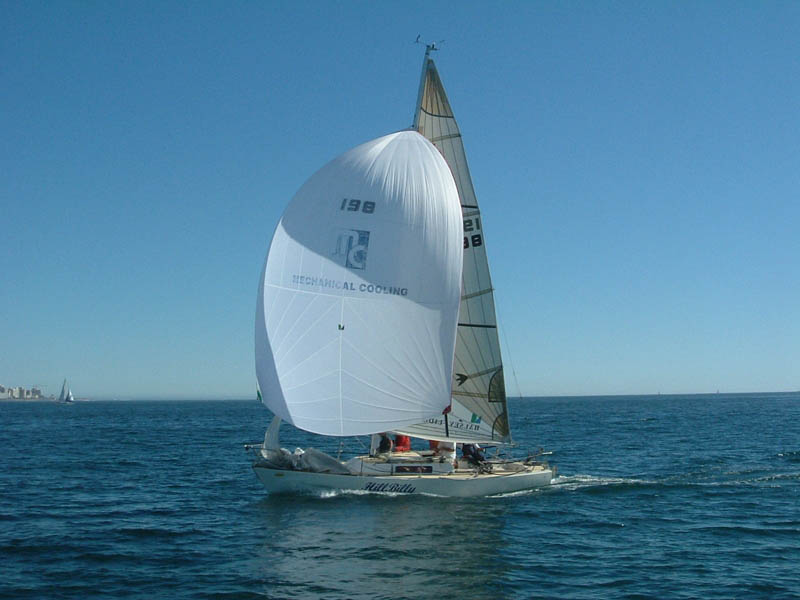

Development
- Designer: Rod Johnstone
- Year: 1983
- Design: One-Design
- Name: J/27

Boat
- Crew: 4 or 5
- Draft: 1.49 m (4 ft 11 in)

Hull
- Type: Monohull
- Construction: GRP
- Hull weight: 1,724 kg (3,801 lb)
- LOA: 8.38 m (27.5 ft)
- LWL: 7.16 m (23.5 ft)
- Beam: 2.59 m (8 ft 6 in)

Hull appendages
- Keel: Fixed 694 kg (1,530 lb)

Rig
- Rig type: Fractional rig

Sails
- Mainsail area: 19.16 m^{2} (206.2 sq ft)
- Jib/genoa area: 14.63 m^{2} (157.5 sq ft)
- Spinnaker area: 52.68 m^{2} (567.0 sq ft)
- Upwind sail area: 33.8 m^{2} (364 sq ft)

Racing
- PHRF: 120

The J/27 is a keelboat built by J/Boats. It is both a weekend cruiser and a One-Design racing class with strict class rules. Designed with a low, heavy keel with a generous sail area, the boat gives good handling in both light and strong winds, but struggles in moderate winds.

== Design ==
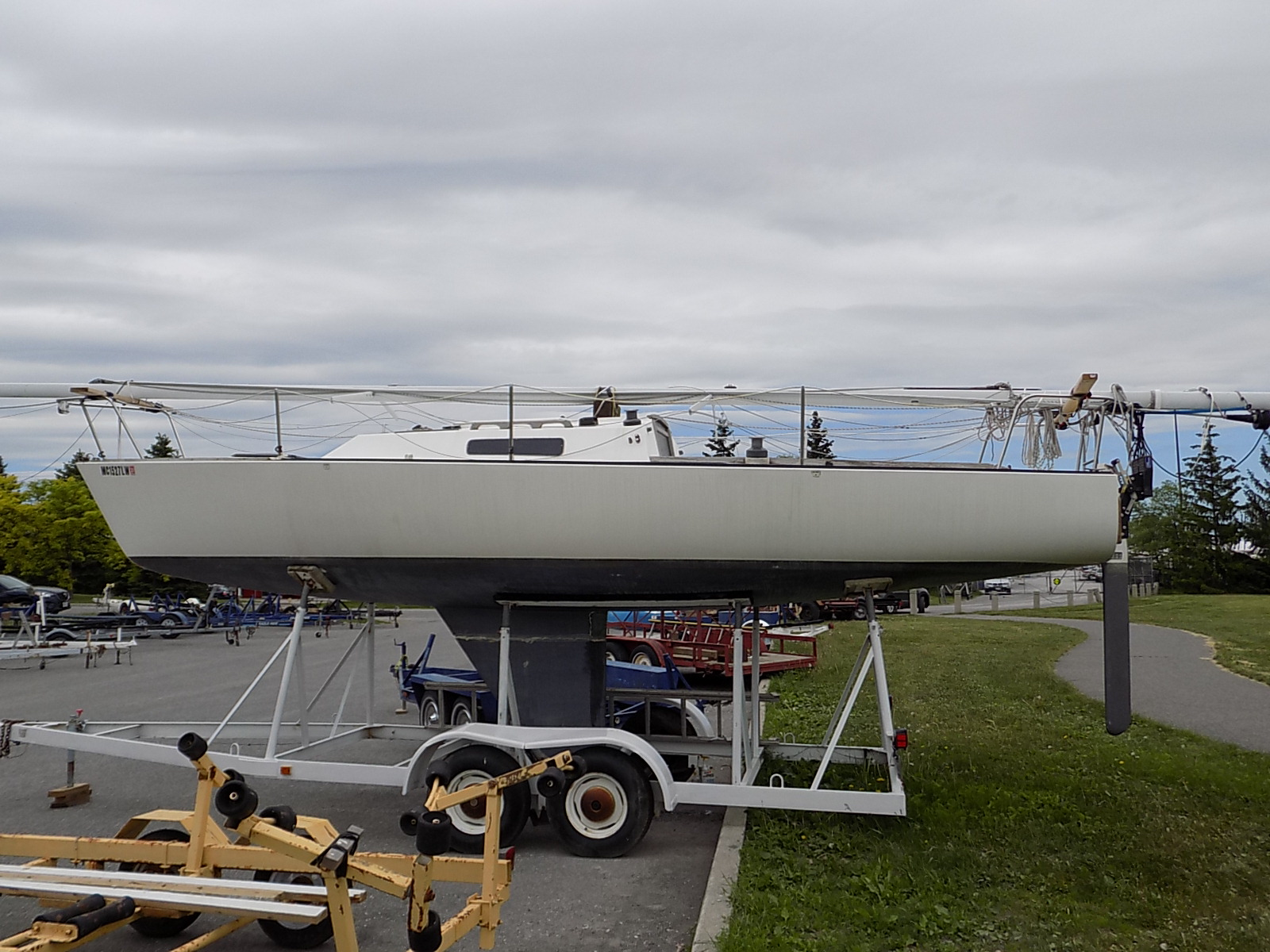
J-27 on its trailer, showing the fin keel and rudder configuration

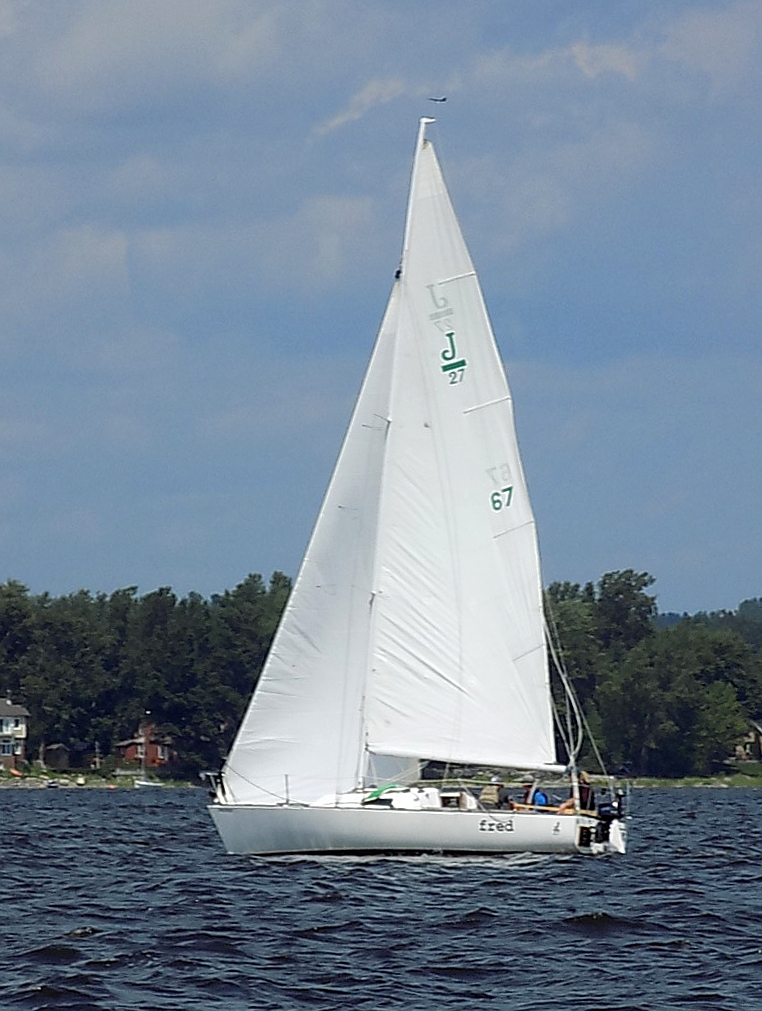
J-27

The J/27 is a Fractional rigged sloop designed by Rod Johnstone and built by Tillotson Pearson, Inc. between 1983 and 1992. 211 boats were built before it was replaced by the J/80.

A large cockpit and open decks allows crew to move around easily, and the Fractional rig means that sail costs are kept down.

The boat has four bunks, and a galley with a standard water capacity of five gallons. Below decks headroom is 4.5 feet (1.4 m). The boat has an outboard engine placed on the transom (port side).

=== Other Specifications ===
- I: 30.00 feet (9.14 m)
- ISP: 30.00 feet (9.14 m)
- J: 10.50 feet (3.20 m)
- P: 33.00 feet (10.06 m)
- E: 12.50 feet (3.81 m)
- SPL: 10.50 feet (3.20 m)
- Displacement to length ratio (Disp/L)= 139.
- Sail Area to displacement ratio (SA/Dspl)= 24.

== See also ==
- J/22
- J/24
- J/32
