= Douglas 32 =

1960s Canadian recreational keelboat

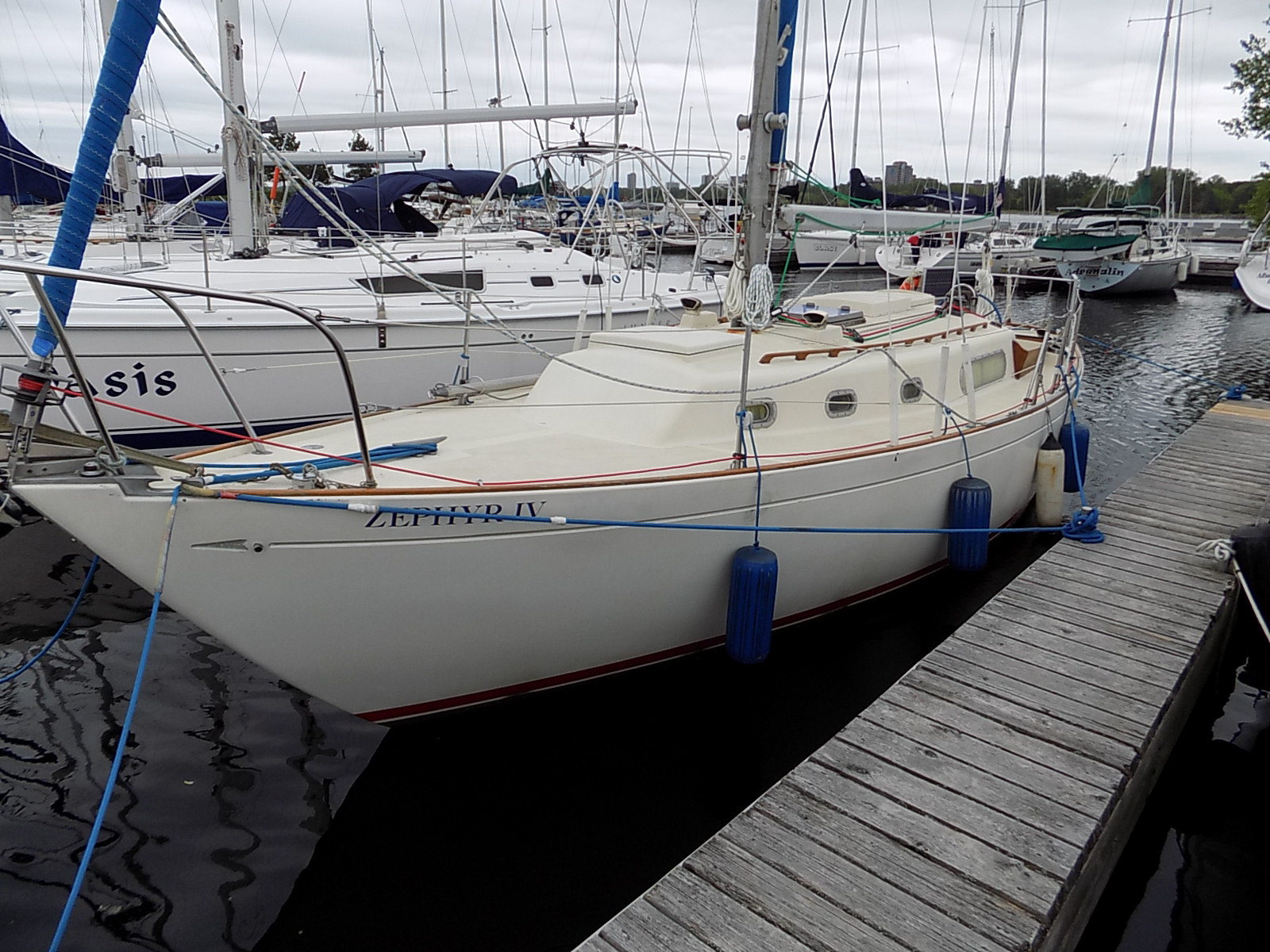

Development
- Designer: Ted Brewer
- Location: Canada
- Year: 1967
- Builders: Douglas Marine Craft; North American Fiberglas Moldings; Command Yachts; Bruce Peninsula Yachts; Hullmaster Boats; Doug Smith; J&C Fibercraft; Hinterhoeller Yachts
- Name: Douglas 32

Boat
- Displacement: 11,500 lb (5,216 kg)
- Draft: 4.67 ft (1.42 m)

Hull
- Type: Monohull
- Construction: Fiberglass
- LOA: 32.09 ft (9.78 m)
- LWL: 24.50 ft (7.47 m)
- Beam: 9.50 ft (2.90 m)
- Engine: Inboard motor

Hull appendages
- Keel: long keel
- Rudder: keel-mounted rudder

Rig
- Rig type: Bermuda rig
- I foretriangle height: 37.50 ft (11.43 m)
- J foretriangle base: 12.70 ft (3.87 m)
- P mainsail luff: 32.00 ft (9.75 m)
- E mainsail foot: 13.80 ft (4.21 m)

Sails
- Sailplan: Fractional rigged sloop Masthead sloop
- Mainsail area: 220.80 sq ft (20.513 m^{2})
- Jib/genoa area: 238.13 sq ft (22.123 m^{2})
- Total sail area: 458.93 sq ft (42.636 m^{2})

Racing
- PHRF: 201 (average)

The Douglas 31 and Douglas 32 are a series of recreational keelboats that were designed by Ted Brewer and first built in 1967. The last boats of this design were built in 1982 and delivered as kits.

== Production ==
The design was commissioned by Douglas Badgley, designed by Brewer as the Douglas 31 and initially built by Badgley's company, Douglas Marine Craft in Port Stanley, Ontario, Canada, with production commencing in 1967. Douglas Marine Craft went out of business in 1970-71 and creditors seized the company assets, including the design's molds.

Jeffrey White of North American Fiberglas Moldings of London, Ontario, acquired a set of Douglas 31 hull and deck molds and had Brewer modify the design to incorporate an extended reverse transom. The new version was known as the Douglas 32. In 1974, North American Fiberglas entered receivership, emerging as Command Yachts, under the same management and produced the Douglas 32 Mark II model. In about 1976 Command Yachts was purchased by De Leuw Cather Canada and the boat building division was shut down.

Bruce Peninsula Yachts of Port Elgin, Ontario then bought the molds and built the Douglas 32 Mark II, with a new cabin configuration.

Hullmaster Boats of Picton, Ontario, had also purchased at least one of the original Douglas 31 molds at about the same time that North American Fibreglas Mouldings had acquired their molds, and built the design as the Hullmaster 31, completing production in 1979.

Following Hullmaster's bankruptcy, Doug Smith acquired the Douglas 31 molds and built the design in the form of a kit for owners to finish. Smith then sold his business to Jed and Carol Benoit of J&C Fibercraft, based in Barrie, Ontario, who then used the molds to produce the Douglas 31.

Hinterhoeller Yachts built the last six Douglas 31 hulls in about 1982. These were then delivered to customers as kits for owner completion.

== Design ==
The Douglas 32 is built predominantly of fiberglass, with wood trim. It has a masthead sloop rig; a spooned, raked stem; a raised counter, reverse transom; a keel-mounted rudder controlled by a wheel and a fixed long keel. It displaces 11,500 lb (5,216 kg).

The boat has a draft of 4.67 ft (1.42 m) with the integral long keel.

The design has a PHRF racing average handicap of 201. It has a hull speed of 6.63 kn (12.28 km/h).
