= Bayfield 30/32 =

Sailboat class

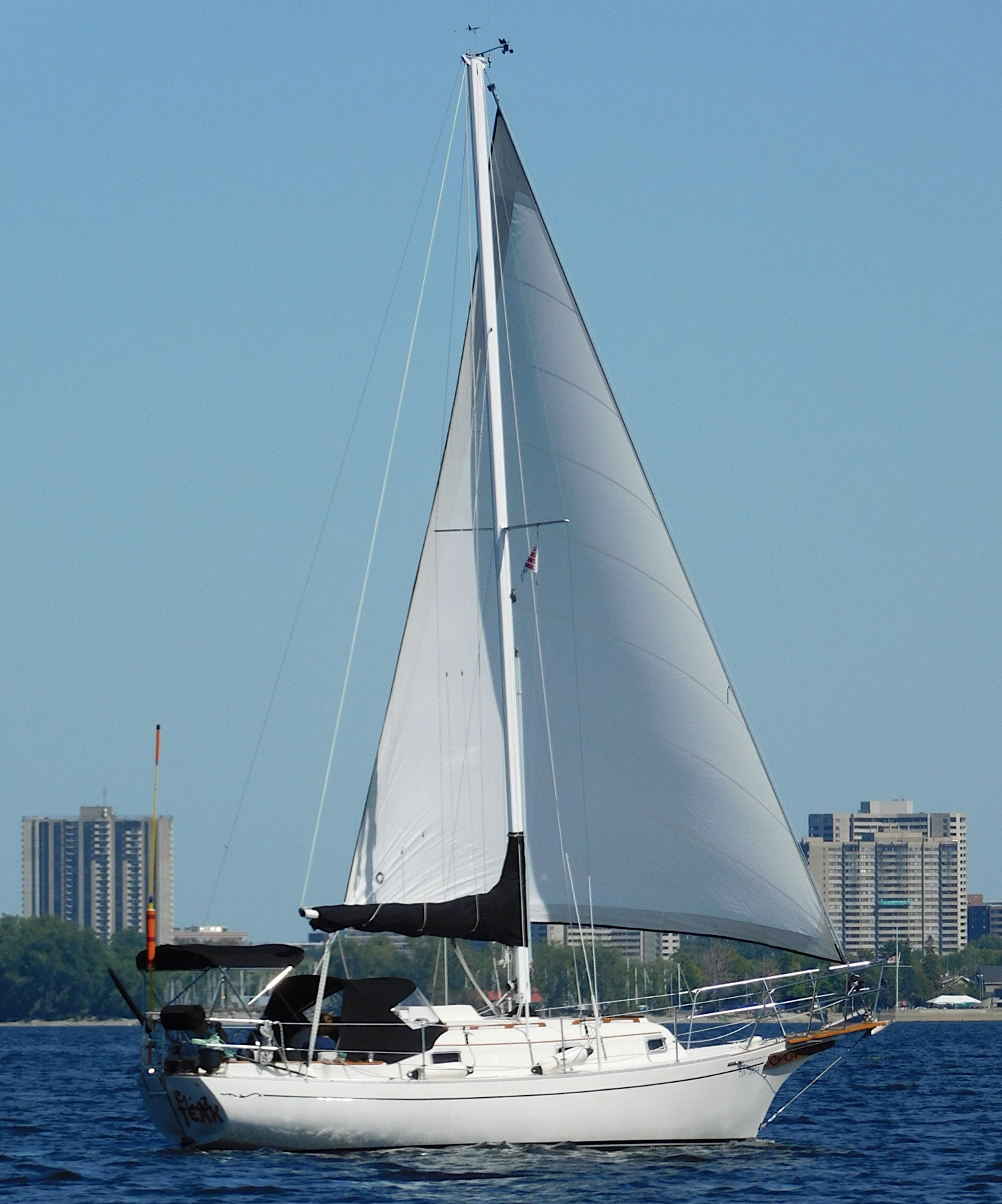
- Bayfield 32

Development
- Designer: Ted Gozzard
- Location: Canada
- Year: 1973
- No. built: more than 300
- Builder: Bayfield Boat Yard
- Name: Bayfield 30/32

Boat
- Displacement: 9,600 lb (4,354 kg)
- Draft: 3.75 ft (1.14 m)
- Air draft: 45 ft (14 m)

Hull
- Type: Monohull
- Construction: Fiberglass
- LOA: 32.00 ft (9.75 m)
- LOH: 30.00 ft (9.14 m)
- LWL: 23.25 ft (7.09 m)
- Beam: 10.50 ft (3.20 m)
- Engine: Yanmar 21 hp (16 kW) diesel engine

Hull appendages
- Keel: long keel
- Ballast: internal lead, 4,000 lb (1,814 kg)
- Rudder: keel-mounted rudder

Rig
- Rig type: Bermuda rig
- I foretriangle height: 35.00 ft (10.67 m)
- J foretriangle base: 14.00 ft (4.27 m)
- P mainsail luff: 30.00 ft (9.14 m)
- E mainsail foot: 12.50 ft (3.81 m)

Sails
- Sailplan: Cutter rigged sloop
- Mainsail area: 187.50 sq ft (17.419 m^{2})
- Jib/genoa area: 245.00 sq ft (22.761 m^{2})
- Total sail area: 432.50 sq ft (40.181 m^{2})

Racing
- PHRF: 228 (average)

The Bayfield 30/32 is a Canadian sailboat, that was designed by Ted Gozzard as a cruising boat and first built in 1973.

First marketed as the Bayfield 30, the name was eventually changed to the Bayfield 32 due to pressure from United States dealers who insisted on calling the boat a "32" based on its LOA, which included the clipper bow and bowsprit. The combination of traditional design, modern construction, and roomy interiors for this size of the boat was popular from the start. More than 300 Bayfield 30/32s were built during their long production run.

== Production ==
The design was built by Bayfield Boat Yard, first in Bayfield, Ontario, and later in Clinton, Ontario, Canada, but it is now out of production.

== Design ==
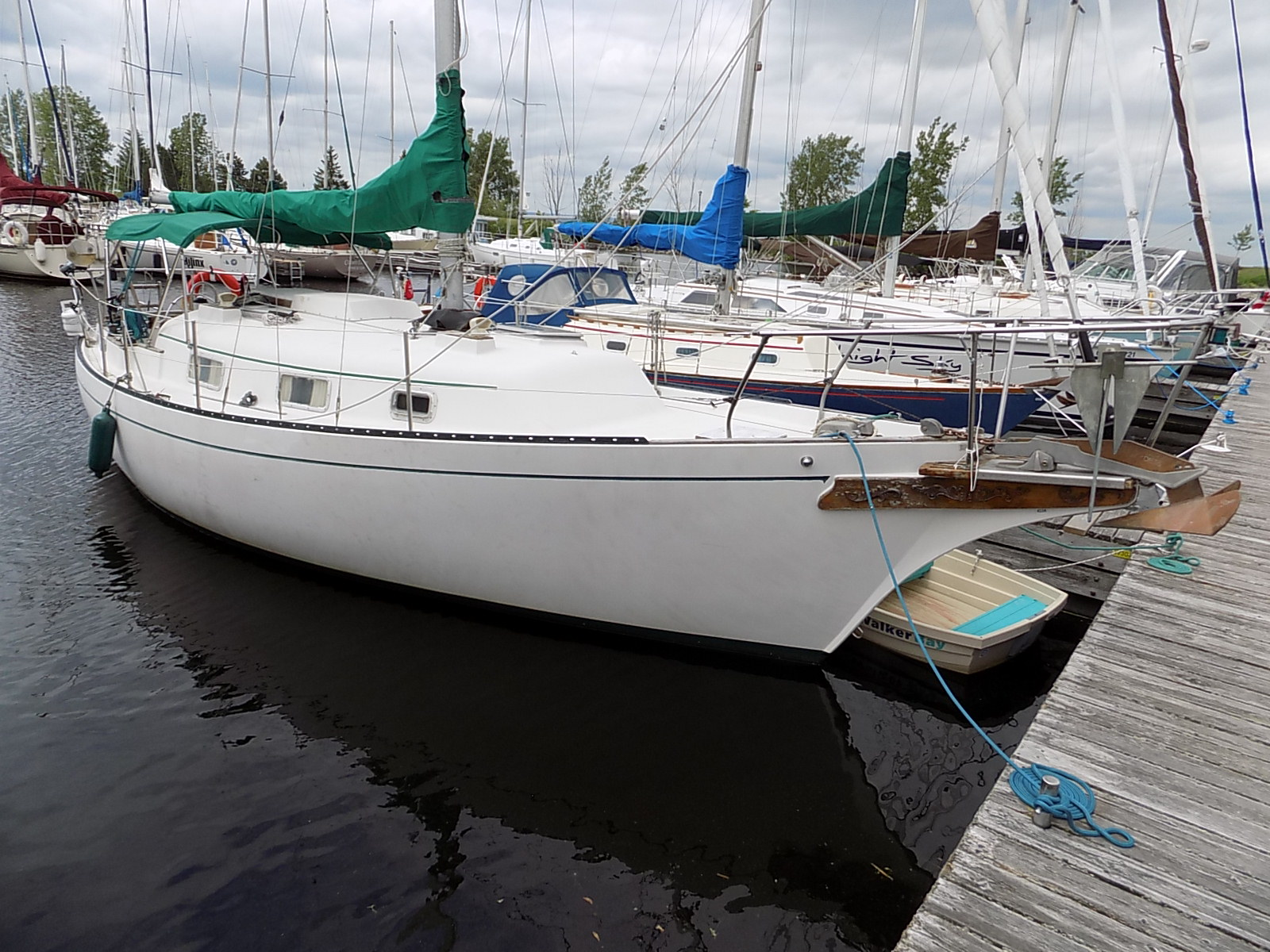
Bayfield 32

The Bayfield 30/32 is a recreational keelboat, built predominantly of fiberglass, with wood trim. Most were built with a cutter rig, though a few ketches were produced, with a sail area of 525 sq ft (48.8 m^{2}). A small number of special, tall-rig sloops were built, with 4 ft (1.2 m) of additional mast height, and an extended bowsprit increasing the total sail area to 662 sq ft (61.5 m^{2}). This version was sold as the Bayfield 32C.

The 30/32 featured a clipper bow, a bowsprit, wooden decorative trailboards on the bow, a keel-mounted rudder controlled by a wheel and a fixed long keel. The hulls were solid fiberglass in a fairly heavy lay up with mat and woven roving. The deck was cored with 3/8th-inch balsa, while some high-load areas were cored with plywood. The 30/32 displaces 9,600 lb (4,354 kg) and carries 4,000 lb (1,814 kg) of internally mounted lead ballast.

The boat has a draft of 3.75 ft (1.14 m) with the standard keel and most boats were fitted with a Japanese Yanmar diesel engine of two cylinders and 15 hp (11 kW) or, less commonly three cylinders and 21 hp (16 kW), though a few early Bayfield 30/32s were fitted with a unique Sperry Vickers hydraulic drive and a few with Mercedes-Benz diesels.

The mainsheet traveller is mounted at the aft of the cockpit. The staysail has tracks mounted inboard and the genoa has outboard tracks on the bulwarks. The cockpit has dual two-speed winches and dual single speed winches. The three halyard winches are mounted on the aft coach house roof.

The design has a PHRF racing average handicap of 228 with a high of 222 and low of 237. It has a hull speed of 6.46 kn (11.96 km/h).

=== Accommodations ===
The accommodations include a forward cabin with a door and "V"-berth. The door can close the cabin or the starboard-mounted head. The main cabin has three berths, a pull-out double berth and a quarter berth. The chart table stows in the cabin ceiling. The galley is located on the starboard side and has a stainless steel sink with a pressurized water supply, a two burner stove with oven, and a 4.0 ft (1.2 m) ice box that has a teak ice grate. Originally the cabin was fitted with dorade vents and an opening hatch, along with five fixed ports, and one opening port in the heads, though later boats had the number of port lights increased to eight.

== Operational history ==
In a review Michael McGoldrick wrote, "The Bayfield line of sailboats are dedicated cruising boats and aren't known for their outstanding performance. However, the Bayfield 32 equipped with a tall rig is supposed to be quite fast, although it will not point as high as a club racer with a fin keel. This boat has a shallow draft, a wide beam, and plenty of living space down below. The Bayfield 32 is a good looking boat with a distinctive appearance which sets it apart from the many look-alike boats that were manufactured in Canada in large numbers in the 1970s and 1980s."

A 2010 review in Sailing magazine concluded, "the Bayfield 32 is another example of why there's no excuse not to get out on the water. This sturdy, handsome, quality cruiser is an ideal family boat that will provide drama-free sailing for years to come."

== See also ==
- List of sailing boat types
