= C&C 37/40 =

Sailboat class

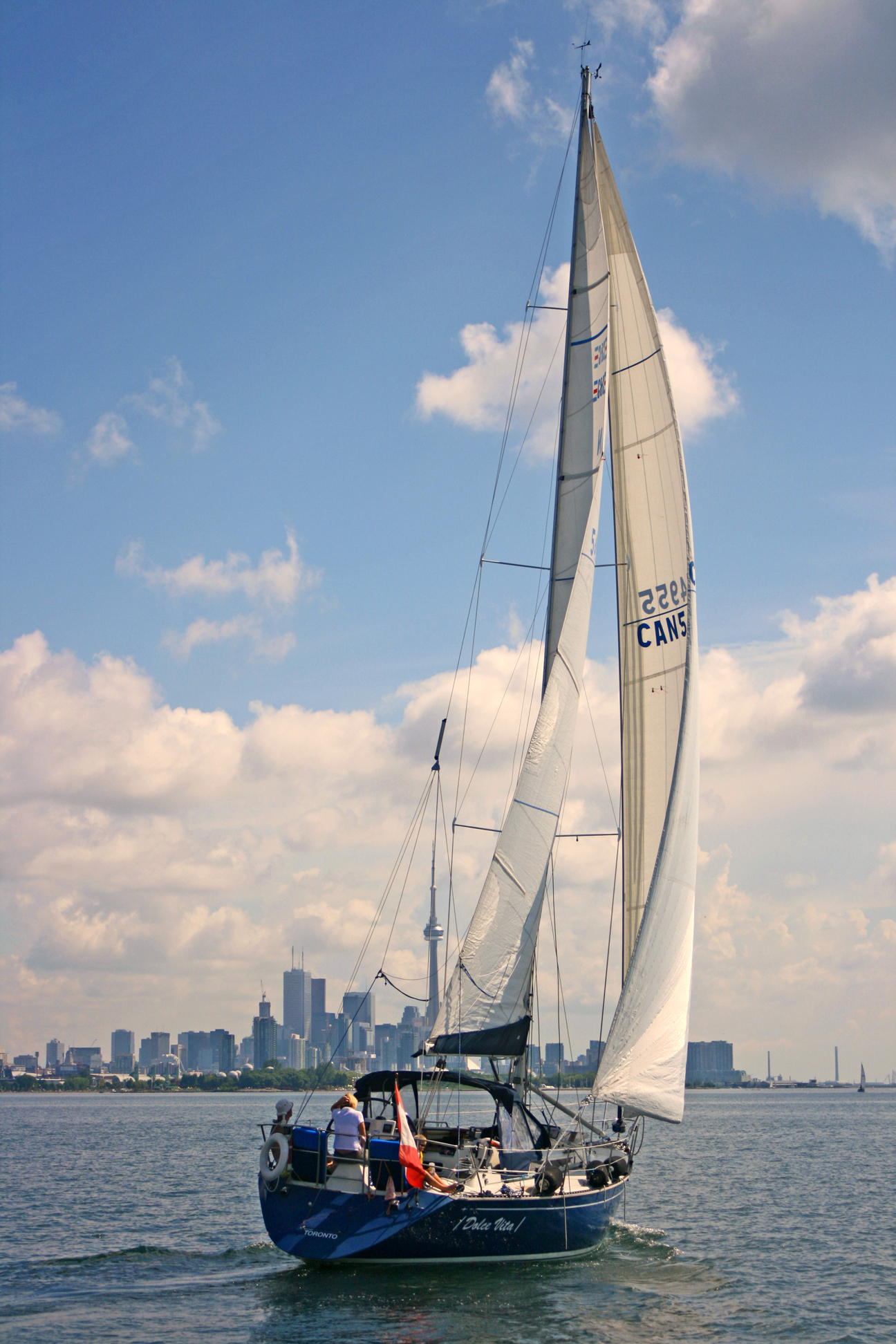

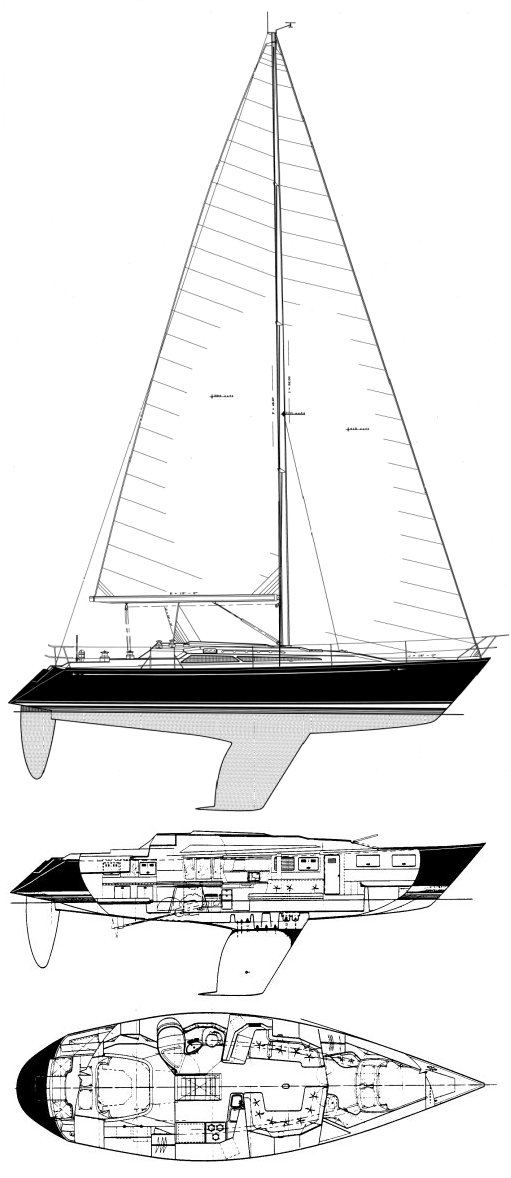

Development
- Designer: Robert W. Ball, Cuthbertson & Cassian (C&C Designs)
- Location: Canada
- Year: 1988
- No. built: 112 (all models)
- Brand: C&C
- Builder: C&C Yachts
- Role: Offshore Cruiser/Racer

Boat
- Displacement: (37/40+) 17,500 lb (7,938 kg) (37/40XL) 16,500 lb (7,484 kg) (37/40R) 14,900 lb (6,759 kg)
- Draft: from 4.92 ft (1.50 m) to 7.33 ft (2.23 m) or 8.17 ft (2.49 m) depending on keel fitted.
- Air draft: 57.5 ft (17.5 m) or 59 ft (18 m) for tall (R & XL) mast (includes wind instrument sensor, add VHF antenna height).

Hull
- Type: Monohull
- Construction: Fibre-reinforced plastic using DuPont hybrid material that combines Kevlar with fiberglass.
- LOA: 39.42 ft (12.02 m)
- LWL: 31.75 ft (9.68 m)
- Beam: 12.58 ft (3.83 m)
- Engine: Universal Model 35 or Yanmar 30 hp (22 kW) diesel engine

Hull appendages
- Keel: fin keel (wing or keel/centreboard are options)
- Ballast: lead, (37/40+) 6,750 lb (3,062 kg) (37/40XL) 6,950 lb (3,152 kg) (37/40R) 7,250 lb (3,289 kg)
- Rudder: internally-mounted spade-type rudder

Rig
- General: Bermuda rig, keel stepped mast
- I foretriangle height: (37/40+) 52.00 ft (15.85 m) (37/40XL) 53.50 ft (16.31 m) (37/40R) 54.00 ft (16.46 m)
- J foretriangle base: (37/40+) 16.00 ft (4.88 m) (37/40XL) 16.00 ft (4.88 m) (37/40R) 15.58 ft (4.75 m)
- P mainsail luff: (37/40+) 45.67 ft (13.92 m) (37/40XL) 47.25 ft (14.40 m) (37/40R) 48.20 ft (14.69 m)
- E mainsail foot: (37/40+) 15.50 ft (4.72 m) (37/40XL) 15.50 ft (4.72 m) (37/40R) 15.58 ft (4.75 m)
- Mast height: 53 ft (16 m) or 54.5 ft (16.6 m) for tall (R & XL) mast
- Rig other: actual total length of spar (mast) 58 ft (18 m) or 59.5 ft (18.1 m) for tall (R & XL) mast

Sails
- Sailplan: Masthead sloop
- Mainsail area: (37+) 353.94 sq ft (32.882 m^{2}) (37XL) 366.19 sq ft (34.020 m^{2}) (37R) 377.19 sq ft (35.042 m^{2})
- Jib/genoa area: (37+) 416.00 sq ft (38.648 m^{2}) (37XL) 428.00 sq ft (39.763 m^{2}) (37R) 420.66 sq ft (39.081 m^{2})
- Total sail area: (37+) 770 sq ft (72 m^{2}) (37XL) 794 sq ft (73.8 m^{2}) (37R) 800 sq ft (74 m^{2})

Rating
- PHRF: 75 (average)

The C&C 37/40 is a Canadian 12.05 metres (39.5 ft) LOA fibreglass monohull sailing yacht, designed in 1988 by Robert W. Ball of Cuthbertson & Cassian (C&C Designs) as a replacement for the earlier C&C 37 dating from 1981. The C&C 37/40 is a recreational keelboat of moderate displacement, intended as a cruiser/racer or oceangoing racer (depending on model). The yachts have a masthead sloop rig, with a fin keel and an internally-mounted spade-type rudder. Over 110 of the 37/40 type were built before the Canadian plant closed in 1994. The design is no longer produced.

There are three basic models of the C&C 37/40: the Custom 37/40 R "racing" model, the 37/40+, and the 37/40 XL (Extra Light). The boats were essentially semi-custom with the factory offering different mast, rigging, and keel options. Other factory options included standard or lighter weight racing laminate layups for the hull, rudder, and deck, as well as different companionway, cockpit and transom configurations (open or closed), and various interior options and modifications.

== Production history ==
C&C Yachts was a builder of high-performance fiberglass monohull sailboats with production facilities in Canada, Germany, and the United States. C&C designed and constructed a full range of production line cruiser-racer boats, as well as custom one-off and short production run racing and cruising boats. C&C boats ranged in size from as small as 21 ft (6.4 m) to as large as 67 ft (20.4 m). C&C also produced a line of bluewater cruising boats in the 35 ft (10.7 m) to 48 ft (14.6 m) range under its Landfall brand. In addition, C&C designed sailboats for production by a number of other manufacturers such as CS Yachts, Mirage Yachts, Northern Yachts, Ontario Yachts, Paceship Yachts, and Tanzer Industries.

C&C was founded in 1969 as a public company in Canada, which resulted from a joint venture among several predecessor companies and design teams. At the peak of its market success, the company supplied 50% of the Canadian market and 20% of the US market. The company name, C&C Yachts, came from the names of two of the founding designers, George Cuthbertson and George Cassian.

Along with the C&C 30 and C&C 34+, the C&C 37/40 made up a group of new C&C designed and produced aft cabin boats that went into production in the late 1980s under the guidance of Robert Ball, the chief in-house designer at C&C Yachts from 1973 to 1991. First introduced in 1988, this second version of the C&C 37 is a completely different design from Robert Ball's earlier C&C 37 dating from 1981. Initially intended as an updated replacement for the earlier 37, the 37/40 gradually stretched out during the design process until its final overall length was almost 40 ft (12 m). In an interview Robert Ball said they started out drawing a nice 37-foot interior, then just stretched the ends to give the boat more grace and style.

Number of C&C 37/40 built by year, based on known, publicly registered Hull Identification Number (HIN). Actual numbers built are slightly higher in some years.
Build Year	37R (37/40 R)	37+ (37/40+ & 37/40 XL)
1988	3	1
1989	10	39
1990	7	30
1991	0	5
1992	0	0
1993	1	8
1994	0	3

The last boats in the 37/40 series came off the production line in 1994, just before a devastating fire destroyed the C&C factory in Niagara-on-the-Lake.

== Name and marketing ==
All construction drawings from the design phase refer to this boat as the "new 37+". It was first offered as the C&C 37R and C&C 37+ but soon was marketed as the C&C 37/40R and C&C 37/40+ due to its actual LOA of 39.5 ft (12.0 m). Early purchasers of the new boat began to request a mix of the standard features of both the "R" and the "+" combined in their orders so an "XL" (Extra Light) version was developed to meet this demand. On the design of the 37/40 Robert Ball said:

I really love that design, and feel it really was/is the culmination of all the past experience, and designs that I did . . . .

The fun part was that the goal of the basic design was ‘A Fast Boat’ without any distortions for handicap rules . . The rule being used mostly was PHRF and keeping the name at 37 when the boat was actually longer than that was a tongue-in-cheek effort to fool the handicappers when it was introduced . . . After the boat was sailing and presumably sailing better than a 37 footer, they would change the rating – but by then we would have at least created ‘notice’ in the marketplace – HA . . . . . In truth I did have a 37.49 foot design ready, but pleaded with marketing to lengthen it. Indeed it was the longest waterline 37 footer, the most interior 37 footer, maybe the fastest 37 footer . . . . BUT it was also the most expensive 37 footer . . . . The marketing guys pushed for the name change(s) . . .

Everyone that I have run into – love the boat . . . .

In 1990 C&C Yachts found itself in financial difficulty, resulting in production of the 37/40 halting in 1991 after hull number 79. When the C&C 37/40 went back into production (with hull 80) in 1993 an attempt was made to re-brand the 37/40 series as the "C&C 40" with new marketing literature and brochures produced. At this point in production the length code in the Hull Identification Number (HIN) was changed from 37 to 40 (for the boats built in 1993 and 1994) though the hull number continued in sequence. There were no significant changes in the design at this time. Confusingly, some marketing literature from this period continued to reference the C&C 37/40 name.

One online source, Sailboatdata.com, lists the 37/40 series as both the C&C 37/40, and also as the C&C 37-2,

== Design ==
To come up with a fast boat for IMS racing (or PHRF) designer Robert Ball aimed for maximum all-around speed relative to sailing length by providing a large rig, low center of gravity, narrow waterline beam, and weight concentrated amidships (to minimize pitching). Gentle handling characteristics result in a boat that is easy to sail, and make a boat sail faster in practice, so a big, stall-resistant keel and rudder were an important part of this design. The keel is large and deep, with an elliptical profile and narrow chord length where it joins the hull. There is a partial skeg -ahead of the big rudder to help dampen the quarter wave, improve tracking, and to fair in a more substantial rudder shaft.

Combining a load waterline of almost 32 ft (9.8 m) with modest waterline beam and generous sailing waterline length resulted in a slim, fair underbody, with low wetted surface.

=== Hull and deck ===
The construction of the C&C 37/40 utilizes aircraft grade pre-impregnated balsa core material and Kevlar with fibreglass fabric, the hull and deck are laid up using vinyl ester resin for strength, blister resistance and light weight. The C&C 37 Plus series are built up with isophthalic (Hydrex®) gelcoat, C&C's exclusive Kevlar hybrid, E-Glass, pre-impregnated end-grain Baltek AL-600 balsa (1 in (25 mm) balsa core in hull and .75 in (19 mm) in deck) and Hydrex® resin. Hydrex®, a modified isophthalic vinyl ester resin, has higher hydrolytic stability (ability to resist chemical decomposition in the presence of water), toughness and is more crack resistant than conventional resins. The layups of the R and XL series use Kevlar hybrid exclusively with Hydrex® resin on both sides of a core of Balteck AL-600 aircraft grade balsa. All materials are Lloyd's Register approved as suitable for use in the marine market. These exclusive C&C laminate schedules result in hulls and decks which despite significant weight reduction are stronger than the conventional glass laminates of the time. They are not only much lighter, but stiffer and more rigid. Additional unidirectional glass is used in highly stressed areas with aluminum and Coremat® hardware backing. The boot stripe is molded in the hull for fairness to the hull surface and to reduce maintenance requirements.

All the interior liners are overlaid and bonded to the hull and deck. The hull to deck joint is bonded with adhesive and then mechanically fastened with stainless steel bolts through the signature C&C slotted aluminum toe-rail. The fixed elliptical fin keel has an eight percent foil at the root with reduced chord and an extended trailing edge-hull fillet for interference drag reduction, and an eleven percent foil at the tip to help lower the centre of gravity (Vertical Center of Gravity or VCG). A keel and centreboard combination is an option. The displacement–length ratio (D/L) ranges from 206 to 231, depending on model. The opening transom of the + and XL model is simple to operate and transforms to a walk through transom and swim platform including an integral folding ladder providing easy access to the water. The R version has an open transom.

=== Rudder and Steering ===
Wheel steering is standard (though a tiller was an option on the 37R). The 5.5 ft (1.7 m) rudder is an internally-mounted spade-type with a "spitfire wing" planform. The rudder is constructed of two molded composite shells which are bonded together and injected with two-part foam for added strength. The rudder post is all stainless steel with a flat stainless steel plate reinforcing weldment positioned within the rudder. The rudder post passes through the hull with a water-tight, close tolerance fit between the shaft and the nylon bearing. The rudder post is brought up through the cockpit sole, with the steering quadrant mounted on top. The pedestal system is cable-linked with the radial drive wheel (rudder quadrant) being connected to the rudder post by a keyway and lock nuts. Access to the system is achieved via the removable fiberglass cover located in the cockpit sole. This design provides excellent support for the rudder stock. The rudder may be removed by loosening the bolt, rollers and radial drive wheel. The rudder must be supported from below during this procedure.

=== Ballast ===
The elliptical planform keel is designed by C&C and fabricated by Mars Metal Company (MarsKeel). The keel is of lead alloyed with antimony for added strength and cast to exacting tolerances. In addition to providing the yacht's stability, the foil shape of the keel produces hydrodynamic lift while sailing to weather, enhancing upwind performance.

The factory keels choices included the shoal (shallow) keel with a centreboard, giving a draft of 4.92 ft (1.50 m); a somewhat deeper shoal wing keel, draft of 5.92 ft (1.80 m); a deeper elliptical fin keel with "beaver tail" bulb shoe, draft of 7.33 ft (2.23 m); or the deep elliptical fin racing keel, draft of 8.00 ft (2.44 m)).

The keel is fastened to the hull by means of eight stainless steel bolts of up to 1.5 in (38 mm) diameter, which are cast into the lead. These bolts project through the bottom of the boat and are bedded with sealing material to prevent water leaks. The bolts are secured by 2.25 in (57 mm) stainless steel nuts and washers which are visible in the bilge.

=== Mast and Rigging ===
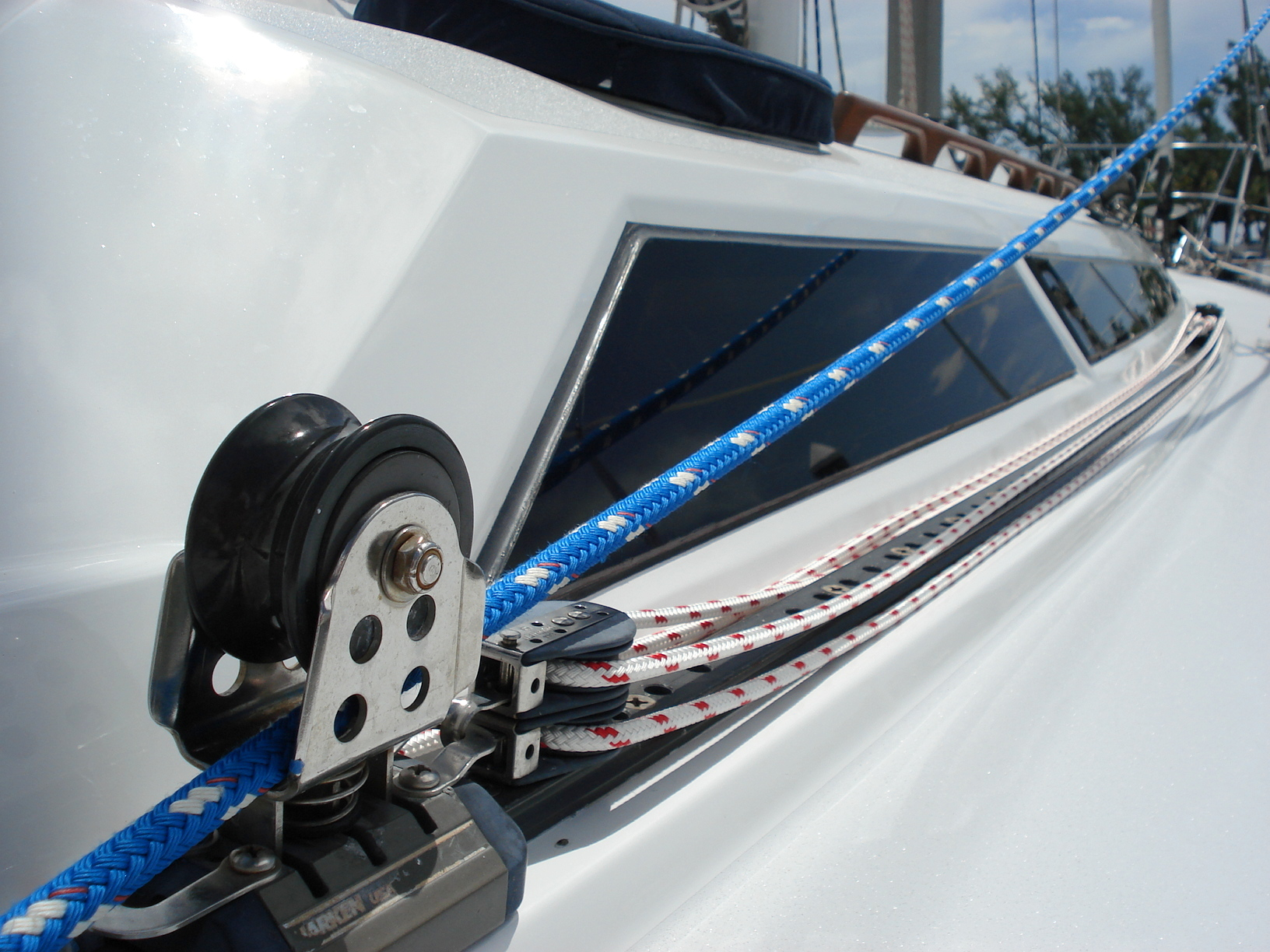
The adjustable fairleads on the Genoa tracks of a C&C 37/40+

The spars are designed by C&C and fabricated by Offshore Spars. The standard boat has a keel stepped non-tapered double spreader masthead sloop rig, with rod rigging and a hydraulic backstay adjuster. A taller rig was available as an option and came standard on the R and XL variants. This tall rig is a triple-spreader mast, tapered above the upper spreaders, with all rod rigging, plus running backstays (runners), checkstays, and an adjustable babystay for mast bend control. The backstay is split, with two hydraulic rams, on the boats with walk through transom (37+ and XL). The masthead, gooseneck and boom end are custom machined aluminum, welded to the one piece extrusion. The aerodynamic spreaders are secured to the mast via machined, continuous aluminum spreader bars. They precisely fit the spreader bases and traverse the mast and along with separate support bars carry the compression loads exerted by the shrouds. On the 37R (and 37XL) mast the middle and lower spreaders are slightly swept back, 2° for the middle spreaders, 4° for the lowers.

The standard rig has an I (foretriangle height) of 52 ft (16 m); the tall rig, I of 53.5 ft (16.3 m); and the R (racing) rig, I of 54 ft (16 m)).

As these boats have an aft cockpit layout, for ease of handling all halyards and controls are led through rope clutches to a pair of two-speed winches (on some boats, four winches are located here) at the aft corners of the cabin top. The primary and secondary winches are positioned at the margins of the wide cockpit. Mainsheet control is through a mainsheet traveller with roller bearing car and crosshaul tackle recessed into the bridge deck. Two inboard genoa tracks with low lead genoa cars rolling on ball-bearing travelers to permit adjustment while under-way and there are additional inboard leads for the light Genoa inset at the aft corners of the cabin.

== Variants ==
=== C&C 37/40 R ===
This model, produced from 1988 to 1990, is laid out for racing and was designed to be competitive under the then current IMS handicapping rule, as well as in PHRF fleets. The 37R hull is built with fibre-reinforced plastic using DuPont hybrid material that combines Kevlar with fiberglass. This combined with C&C's usual balsa core results in a very high strength or stiffness to weight ratio. Unidirectional glass is used for additional local stiffening. Its interior, rather than being based upon moulded pans and liners of the cruiser/racer 37/40+, is organized around a series of plywood longitudinals and bulkheads. These plywood members are rigidly glassed to the hull and contribute considerably to the strength and stiffness of the hull. The massive aluminum chainplates are bolted to sturdy plywood webs which form the back of the settees.

The aft cabin was usually not enclosed on the standard 37R but an enclosed aft cabin version, marketed as the R+ interior, was an option, as were other cruising amenities found standard on the sister 37+, such as hot and cold pressure water and 110 volt shore power. Other factory modifications found in a number of the C&C 37R produced (including R17 and R23) were the substitutions of more exotic materials such as "F" board (Firet Coremat® AE100 Marine Board) in interior bunk tops and other horizontal surfaces, and Balta-Ply mahogany / balsa composite (plywood with a core made of balsa) in interior bulkheads, doors, and other vertical structural members. These changes were intended to lighten the boats further for racing.

==== Technical data ====
The R variant has a draft of 8.16 ft (2.49 m) with the standard elliptical keel and a tall, tapered triple-spreader mast with all rod rigging, plus runners, checkstays, and an adjustable babystay for mast bend control. The R has a PHRF racing average handicap of 66 with a high of 72 and low of 63. It has a theoretical hull speed of 7.36 kn (13.63 km/h). The boat is fitted with a Universal Model 35 diesel engine of 30 hp (22 kW). The fuel tank holds 20 U.S. gallons (76 L; 17 imp gal), the fresh water tank has a capacity of 28 U.S. gallons (110 L; 23 imp gal), and the holding tank has a capacity of 12 U.S. gallons (45 L; 10.0 imp gal). It displaces 14,900 lb (6,759 kg) and carries up to 7,380 lb (3,348 kg) of lead ballast, though displacement and ballast varies by as much as 1,500 lb (680 kg) from the heaviest to the lightest, depending on how the boats were fitted out at the factory.

A number of 37/40 R's intended for lighter wind regions had their keel's weight reduced at the factory by 500 lb (227 kg) by the inclusion of a sand pocket in the lead during the casting process. Some keels were lightened after manufacture using one of several different methods. The factory modification was to cut a window in the keel and fill it with a sand/resin mixture. Post delivery keel modifications have included shaving lead off the sides of the keel and then building it back up with micro-balloons. C&C made full size keel section drawings available to permit fairing the keel after modification and some boats were delivered with full size foil templates for the owner's use.

The C&C 37R "Wave Train", hull number 14 in the 37R production run, built for customer Watt W. Webb, was so extensively customised by the factory that construction drawings specific to this boat were produced. Changes indicated in these drawings include the addition of a waterproof crash bulkhead forward, all interior bulkheads tabbed to the deck above, an upgraded deck and bulkhead construction, and a custom Britt Chance aluminum & lead keel fitted.

The R version can be distinguished from their sister 37/40+ and XL by an "R" in the length code in the HIN, the exception being the first three 37R built, Fastrack (now Holo Nui), hull number 2 in the 37/40 series, the second 37R, "The Third Wave", hull number 4 in the series (scrapped after a hard grounding in 2016), and the third 37R, Andromeda (now Seacan), hull 5 in the series, which have no "R" in their HIN. Somewhere in the first 10 hulls, C&C raised the freeboard by about 1 in (25 mm) to get more headroom under the IMS rule. Over the production run 25 of the 37R were built.

=== C&C 37/40 + ===
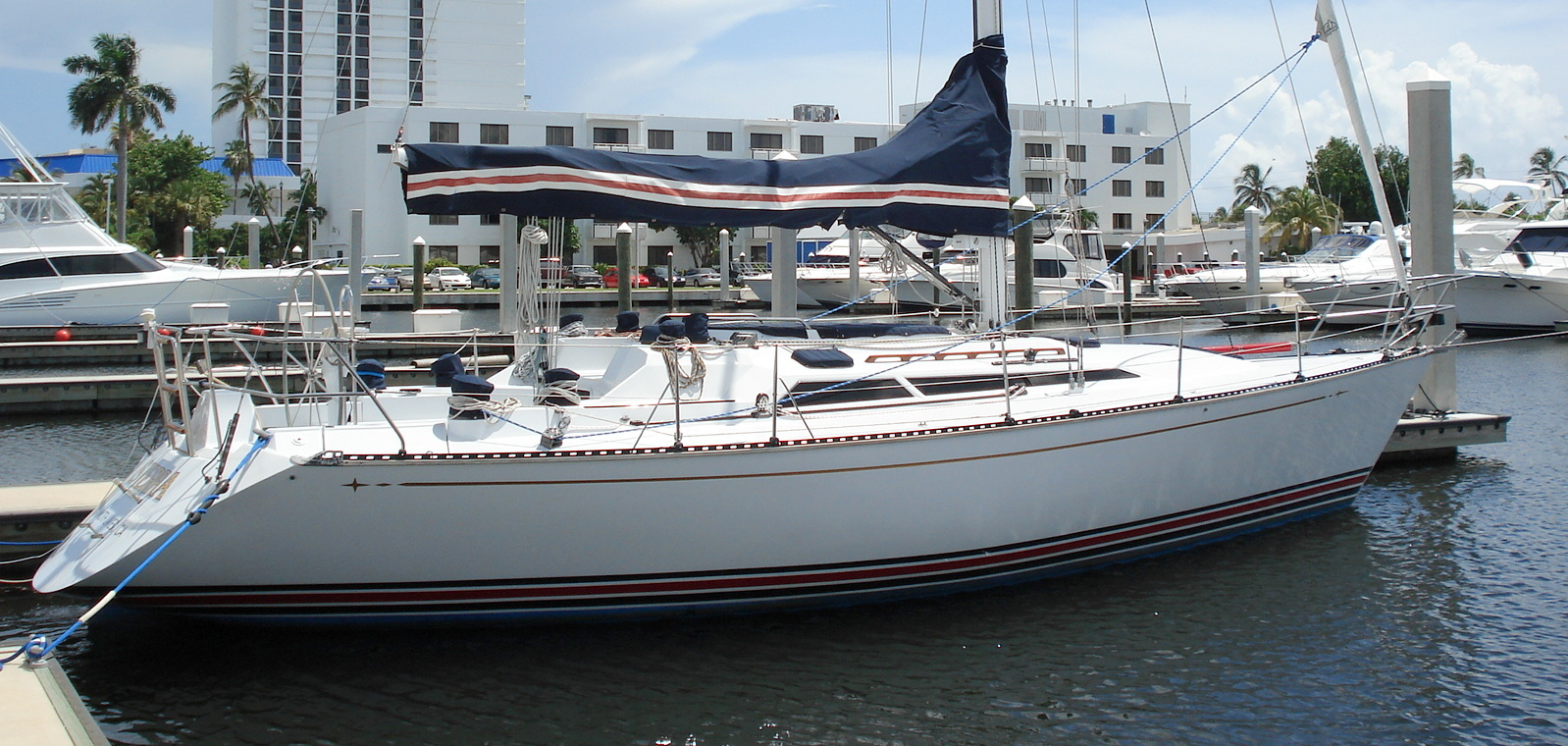
A C&C 37/40+ at the dock.

This model, produced from 1988 to 1994, was based on the 37/40 R hull, using the same molds for hull and deck, but fitted out with a full cruising interior. The interior layout in the C&C 37+ series was a significant departure from the standard C&C interior layout dating back to 1969 and the C&C 35 Mk.1. The biggest change involved moving the heads aft into the area usually occupied by the front half of the quarter berth. By doing this, placing the heads and galley side by side in the widest part of the boat, C&C was able to make them both more spacious and workable. This does move the main cabin forward somewhat into a slightly narrower section of the hull, eliminating the possibility of pilot berths outboard of the settees. This aft head layout was first seen in the C&C Landfall series. The other departure is the inclusion of the full width aft cabin, first seen in the C&C 44 from a few years previous. This was the first design in which C&C was able to fit a full aft cabin into a boat of this length.

==== Accommodations ====
Starting in the forward stateroom, there is a 6.4 ft (2.0 m) long centreline V-berth, with teak staving on the hullsides and louvered teak lockers along either side over the berth. There is a hanging locker to port and a second hanging locker to starboard along with a vanity with sink (hot and cold pressure water), and mirror. The starboard portion of the bulkhead opens to the salon if desired to add visual space to the living area. Ventilation and lighting is provided by a large overhead hatch and two overhead lights.

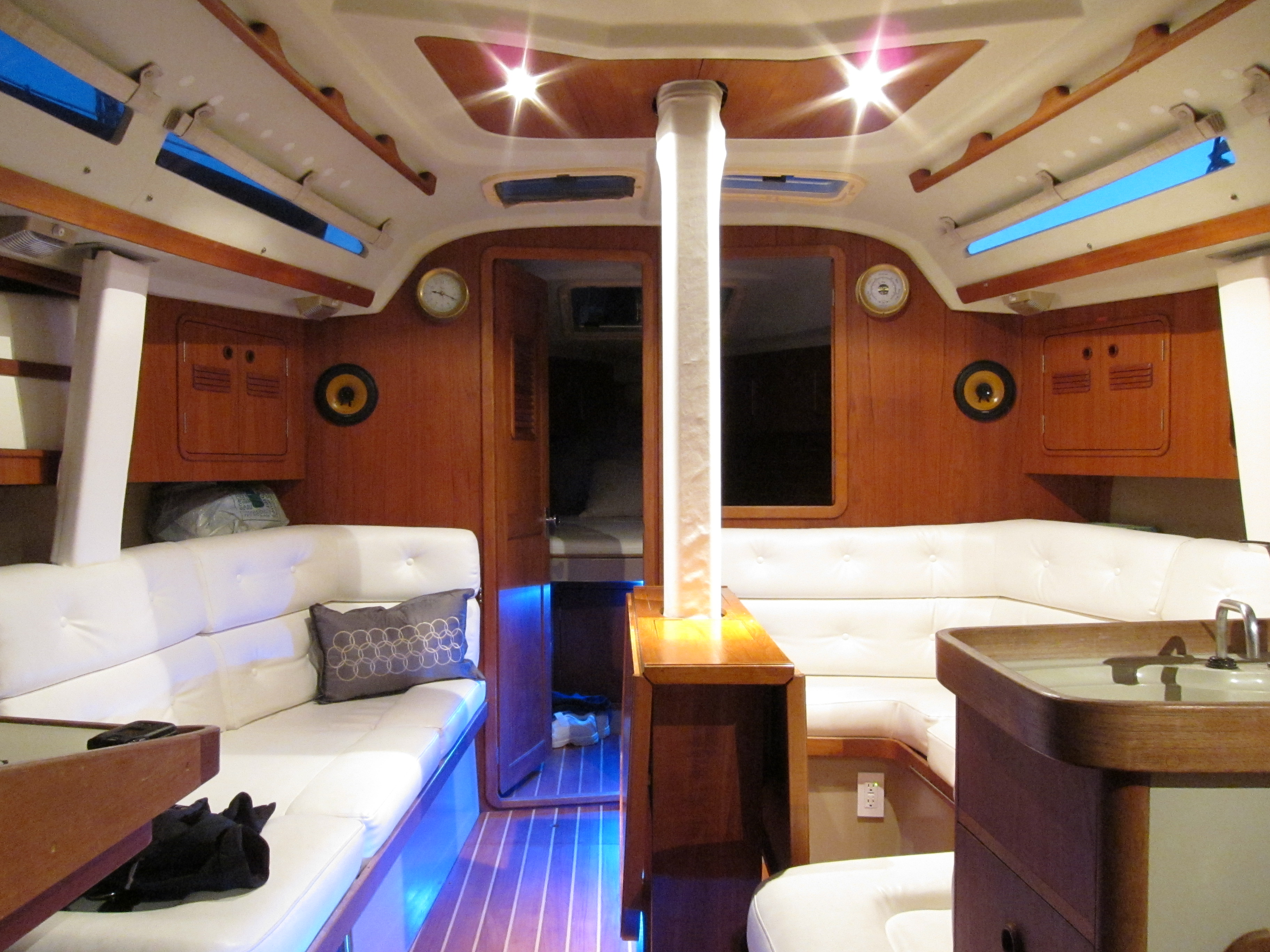
C&C 37-40 Saloon

Moving aft into the saloon, there is a straight settee to port, the aft end of which provides seating for the aft facing navigator's station (nav station). A removable seat back slips in to give the navigator a comfortable back rest. The nav station has drawer storage beneath it and a chart table with ample room to spread out a full sized chart. The electronics and electrical panels are arrayed in a convenient console style.

To starboard is a curved settee that converts to a double berth when required. An inlaid teak table with two drop leaves surrounds the mast. There are teak shelves and louvered locker storage behind both settees.

The entire galley/saloon/nav area is illuminated and ventilated by a large skylight, five fixed lights, four hatches, overhead lighting, four reading lights and nighttime courtesy lighting along the floor.

Aft of the nav station on the port side at the base of the companionway is the head. A louvered teak bi-fold door provides access to the space. Built as a complete molded head unit with full headroom and good ventilation, it includes a vanity sink, marine head, an abundance of mirrored storage cabinets, and a separate stall shower with a Plexiglas door and dividing partition. Hot and cold pressurized water system and electric shower sump pump complete the systems.

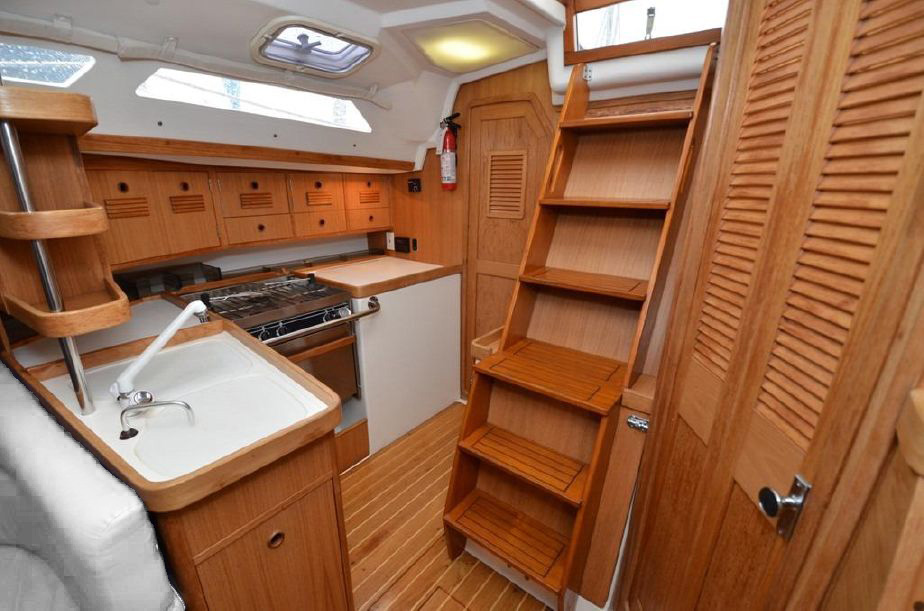
C&C 37-40 Galley Interior

Aft of the settee on starboard is the galley. L-shaped, it features a 7.6 cu ft (0.22 m^{3}) capacity top opening ice box / refrigerator, gimbaled three burner propane stove with oven, hot and cold pressure water, and a deep double centreline sink. Outboard along the hull are numerous storage spaces and lockers for storage, including organizers for silverware and dishes. Pot storage is located below the stove and there is additional storage above and below the galley sink area.

Continuing aft past the galley is the entrance to the aft stateroom. Featuring an island centerline queen berth, 6.5 ft (2.0 m) x 5 ft (1.5 m) with a padded headboard. There is hanging storage to starboard and shelf and locker storage on both sides of the cabin. Numerous lights, mirrors, and four opening ports for ventilation and light.

==== Technical data ====
The 37/40+ displaces 17,500 lb (7,938 kg), carries 7,520 lb (3,411 kg) of ballast with the wing keel (draft of 5.92 ft (1.80 m)) or elliptical keel with small "beaver tail" bulb (draft of 7.25 ft (2.21 m)). It is also available with a shallow draft keel / centreboard combination with 7,800 lb (3,538 kg) of ballast. The boat has a PHRF racing average handicap of 75 with a high of 75 and low of 75. It has a theoretical hull speed of 7.36 kn (13.63 km/h). The boat is fitted with a Universal diesel engine of 30 hp (22 kW), although a Yanmar diesel engine was a later option. The engine has full access on three sides. The fuel tank holds 44 U.S. gallons (170 L; 37 imp gal) and the three fresh water tanks have a combined capacity of 90 U.S. gallons (340 L; 75 imp gal). Over the production run 65 were built.

=== C&C 37/40 XL ===
This model, the "XL" (Extra Light), produced from 1989 to 1994, is built using the 37/40 R's lighter hull and deck, 40 percent lighter than those of the plus series, combined with the R's deeper keel and taller triple-spreader rig. It is in the XL's interior where this model differs from the 37R, as the XL is fitted out with the fully equipped cruising interior of the 37/40+ . The XL displaces 16,500 lb (7,484 kg) and carries 6,520 lb (2,957 kg) of ballast. The boat has a draft of 8.16 ft (2.49 m) with the standard fixed fin keel and 4.92 ft (1.50 m) with the optional centreboard/keel (centreboard up). The boat has a PHRF racing average handicap of 105 with a high of 109 and low of 78. Over the production run 15 of this variant were built.

== Racing ==
The C&C 37R was quite successful on the race course. The first C&C 37/40 produced, C&C 37R "Fastrack", did very well in her first season of racing in 1988, starting out on the Atlantic Coast taking a third in PHRF Class A (out of a 160 boat PHRF fleet) in June 1988's Audi-Yachting Block Island Race Week, then moving to the Pacific Coast and the 1988 Whidbey Island Race Week where Fastrack won PHRF Division A and earned a second overall (out of a 155 boat fleet) for the week after a series of three first-place finishes:

In its short career, the local 37R, Fastrack, has enjoyed outstanding racing success with major victories at Whidbey Island Race Week and Maple Bay Regatta. I joined her crew for a Wednesday night race in what turned out to be light, sloppy conditions and quickly became convinced that the boat was a rocketship. It showed the three largest International Offshore Rule (IOR) boats currently racing in English Bay a clean pair of heels. In winning her Division (second overall) at Whidbey Island Race Week she had to best a well-sailed, modern one-tonner being worked up for the September World Cup in San Francisco, so it is safe to say that the C&C 37R has much the same speed potential as a grand prix IOR 40-footer.

On first release the boat proved so hard to beat on the race course that orders for the racing model totally overwhelmed the orders for the more subdued cruise-race model. A quote from an early review by Yacht Designer Robert H. Perry:

On the surface a nice, family racer-cruiser that happens to be winning a lot of races all over the country. ... As the weeks go by the reports come in. It's fast. It's very fast.

=== Offshore racing ===
C&C 37/40's have competed successfully in many offshore races over the years, including the Newport Bermuda Race, the Marion to Bermuda Race, the Marblehead to Halifax Ocean Race, the Route Halifax Saint-Pierre Ocean Race and the Victoria to Maui International Yacht Race (Vic-Maui).

==== Marblehead to Halifax Ocean Race (MHOR) ====
The Marblehead to Halifax Ocean Race (MHOR) is a biennial sailing race which celebrated its 100th anniversary in 2005. The 360 nautical mile (670 km) course runs between Marblehead, Massachusetts and Halifax, Nova Scotia. In the 2001 MHOR the C&C 37R, The Third Wave (the third of the C&C 37/40 series built), skippered by Hal Davies, captured 1st place in Division II PHRF, Class H, winning both the class cup, "The Wright Cup" and the team cup, "The Parker C. Hatch Memorial Trophy". The Third Wave also competed in the Marblehead to Halifax in other years, including 1997, and 1999 when she raced against another C&C 37/40, the C&C 37XL Lady Hawke, skippered by Will Apold.

==== Victoria to Maui International Yacht Race (Vic-Maui) ====
The Vic-Maui, the longest offshore sailing race off the west coast of North America, starts off Victoria, British Columbia, Canada and finishes near Lahaina, Maui, United States, a distance of approximately 2,308 nautical miles (4,274 km). In the Vic-Maui 1994 the then brand new C&C 37R "Luna" competed, finishing 3rd in Div B, 15th of 24 boats overall. She returned for the Vic-Maui 1996, finishing 5th of 6 in class 2, 14th of 16 boats. The next Vic-Maui in 1998 was Luna's most successful when she captured both the "Blue Gavel" trophy, awarded to the first boat to finish in Class C as well as the "County of Maui" trophy for first on corrected time for Class C, finishing 1st of 5 boats in her class, 7th of 16 boats overall for the ocean race.

Her sister 37R, Fastrack, also competed in the Vic-Maui in three different years under the guidance of skipper Greg Roberts. In 1998 she finished 4th of 5 boats in Class 2, 13th of 16 boats overall; in 2000, finishing 6th of 7 in Class C, 14th of 20 boats competing, and again in 2002 but retired from the 2002 race before finishing.

=== Inshore racing ===
One example, the C&C 37R Malf...Amato took Class 3 in the 50th anniversary Giraglia Rolex Cup inshore race in St Tropez in June 2003, and Overall winner of the Gianni Cozzi Trophy in 2007, beating out 50 other boats.

=== PHRF racing ===
C&C 37/40's still perform very well under the PHRF handicap system, competing in club and coastal races and in offshore events. An example, the C&C 37R The Third Wave won the Premier Class Association Season Championship (Nova Scotia's top yacht racing circuit) in 2003, 2004, 2006, and 2010, and a second in class in the 2010 Route Halifax Saint-Pierre, as well as many of her local club series.

Another example, the C&C 37R Creola, was still actively campaigned as recently as 2011, with podium finishes at Key West Race Week that year.

== Design and Construction Drawings ==
The Marine Museum of the Great Lakes in Kingston, Ontario has in its archives many of the original C&C Design and Construction Drawings dating from 1972 through the late 80's, including at least 29 large (36 in (91 cm) x 48 in (120 cm)) drawings specifically for the 37/40 series.

Drawings specific to the C&C 37/40 series in the collection include:
Accession number	Drawing Number	Title	Date
2008-0012-0069-0001	88-1-17	C&C 37R Construction for Watt Web	Apr 17 1989
2008-0012-0069-0002	88-1-3B	Accommodations for Both 37's	June 5, 1989
2008-0012-0069-0003	88-1-5	Accommodations for New C&C 37R	Apr 6 1988
2008-0012-0069-0004	88-1-3	Construction for C&C 37 R	Mar 23 1988
2008-0012-0069-0005	88-1-14	Construction for C&C 37 & R	May 28, 1988
2008-0012-0069-0006	88-1-33	Spreader Angles for C&C 37 R	Feb 20 1989
2008-0012-0069-0007	STD-13-1	C&C 37 Ladder Detail	Aug 19 1988
2008-0012-0069-0008	Probable 88-1	Steamhead Flitting for New C&C 37	Jun 13 1988
2008-0012-0069-0009	88-1-9	Rudder Design for C&C 37 R	Apr 3 1988
2008-0012-0069-0010	88-1-3	Sink Detail for New C&C 37	Jul 11 1988
2008-0012-0069-0011	88-1-3	Construction for C&C 37 R	Mar 23 1988
2008-0012-0069-0012	Probable 88-1	Deck Plan for New C&C 37 R	Apr-88
2008-0012-0069-0013	88-1-37	Full Size Foils for C&C 37 R (Part 1)	Feb 14 1989
2008-0012-0069-0014	88-1-3C	Revised Accommodations for C&C 37 +	Sept 27 1989
2008-0012-0069-0015	88-1-4	Head Design for New C&C 37	Apr 5 1988
2008-0012-0069-0016	88-1-3B	Mast Location, ETC. for New C&C 37	Aug 17 1988
2008-0012-0069-0017	88-1-3	Spider Design for New C&C 37	Mar 28 1988
2008-0012-0069-0018	88-1-17	C&C 37R Construction for Watt Web	April 17, 1989
2008-0012-0069-0019	88-1-3	Accommodations for New C&C 37	Jun 21 1988
2008-0012-0069-0020	88-1-3	New C&C 37+	Sep-88
2008-0012-0069-0021	88-1	Full Size Foils for C&C 37 R (Part 1)	Feb 14 1989
2008-0012-0069-0022	88-1-15	Construction Sections	1988
2008.0012.0072.0001	88-7-7	Sail Plan C&C 40R	1993
2008.0012.0072.0002	88-7-11	Sail plan C&C 40 XL	1993
2008.0012.0072.0003	88-7-6	Sail Plan C&C 40 +	1993
2008.0012.0072.0004	88-7-7	Sail Plan C&C 37 R	1989
2008.0012.0072.0005	88-7-7	Custom 37 R	1988
2008.0012.0072.0010	88-7-7	Custom 37 R	1988
2008-0012-0082-0001	92-3-1	New Keel Design for C&C 37 Plus	Nov 25 1992

== In the media ==
A number of articles about the C&C 37R and other C&C 37/40 were published, they are used as references in this article but a few are listed here for convenience:

- C&C 37R ONE HOT HOTROD - Pacific Yachting - November 1988
- C&C 37R: Racer from the drawing board of Rob Ball - 1989 FEBRUARY - SAILING
- Fastrack: An Epic Voyage - 2000 Victoria to Maui International YachtRace Program

The C&C 37/40+ Rigolé of San Diego CA was prominently featured on the cover of the July 1997 edition of Sailing and was also featured in the 1999 Cruising World Calendar.

== See also ==
- List of sailing boat types

Similar sailboats

- Beneteau First 38S5
- C&C 121
- Catalina 42
- CS 40
- Farr 40
- Hunter 410
- Swan 40 Frers

== Gallery ==
C&C 37/40 XL
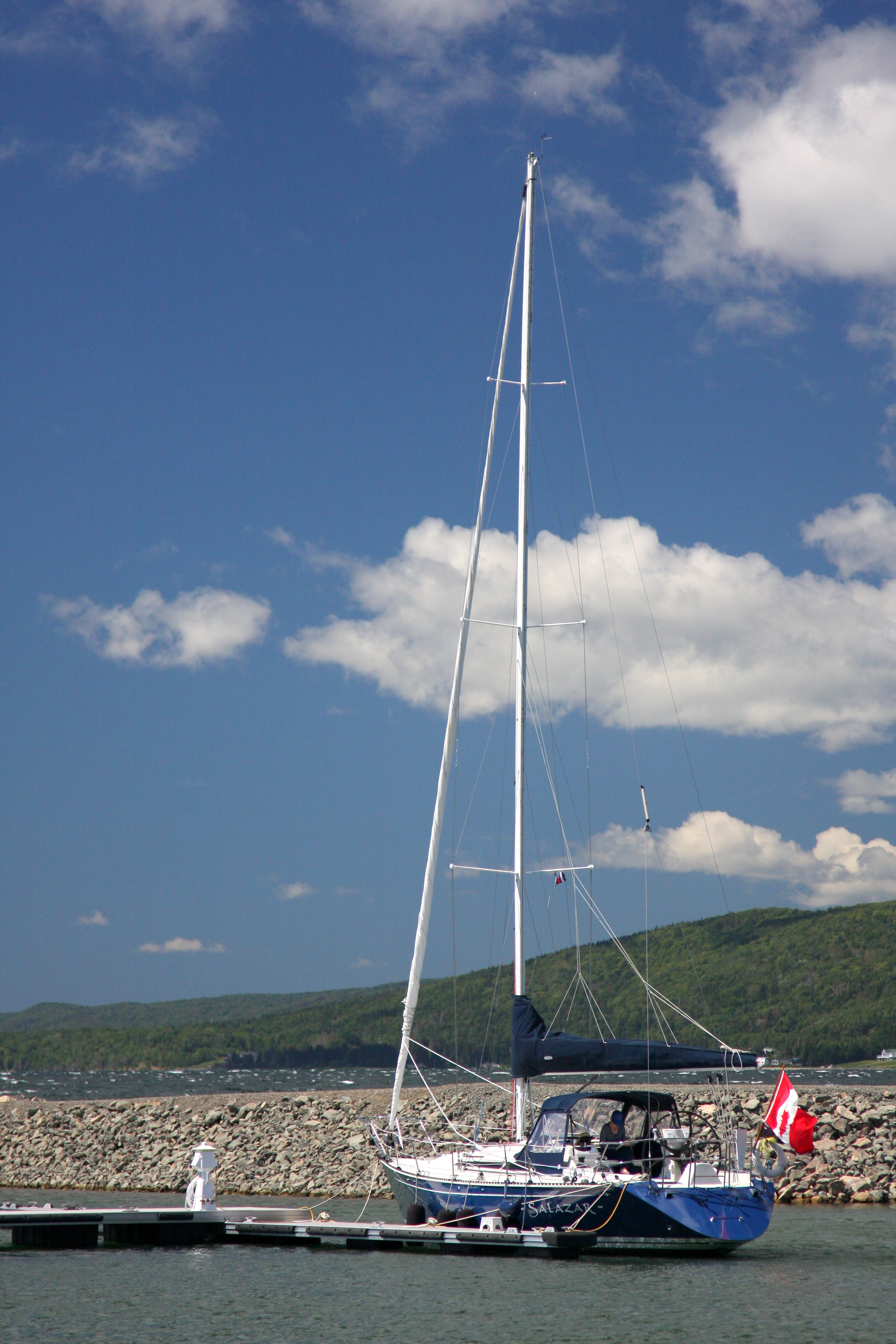
A C&C 37/40 XL lying at dock at Ben Eoin Yacht Club on Cape Breton Island.

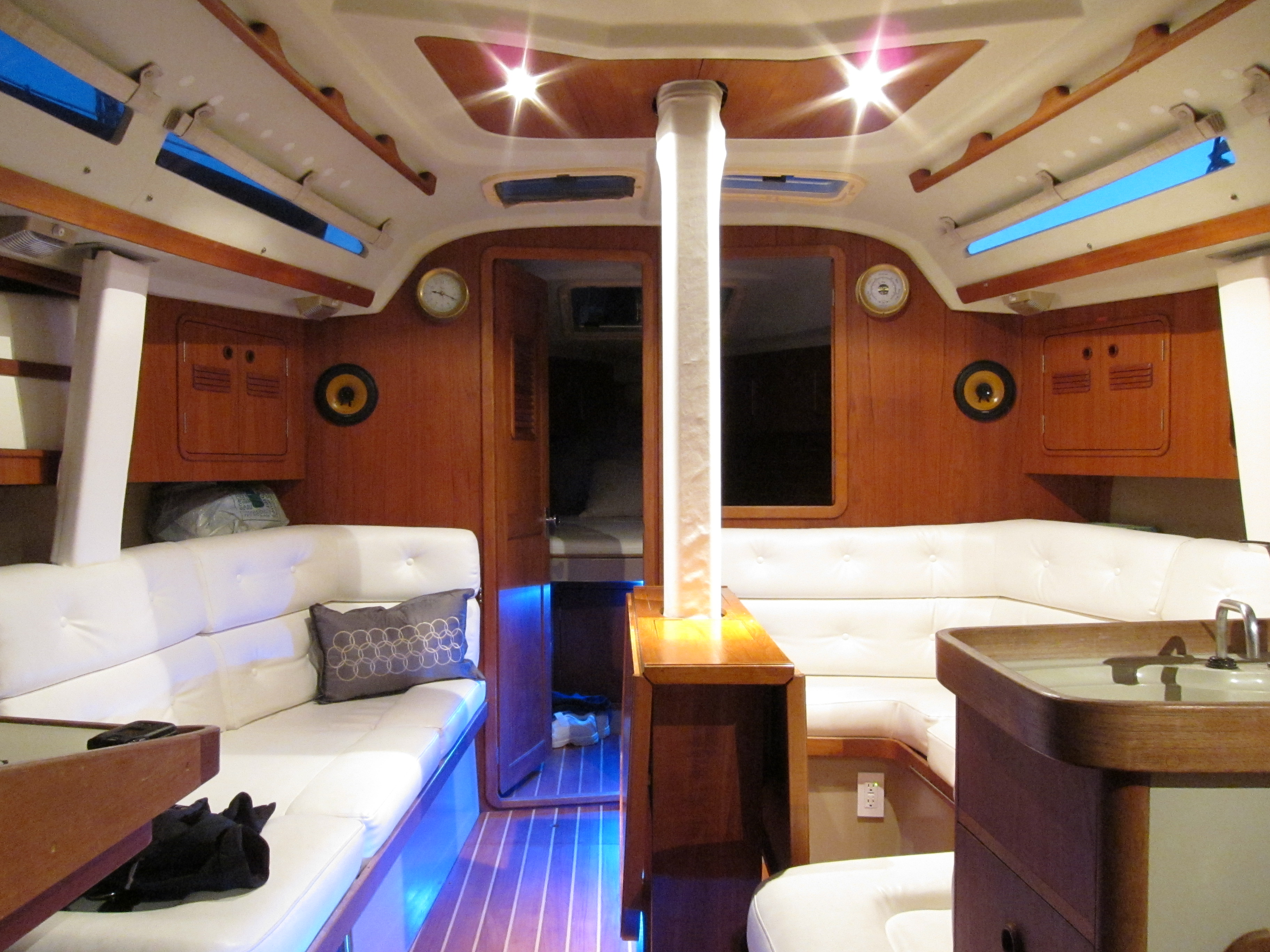
A view of the interior of a C&C 37/40 looking forward through saloon.

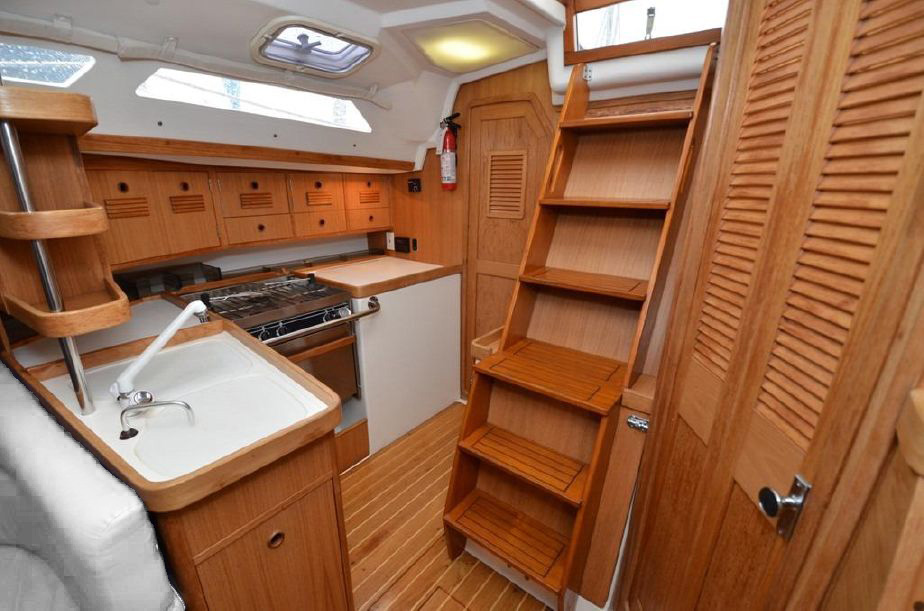
A view of the Galley and Companionway of a C&C 37/40 looking aft to starboard.

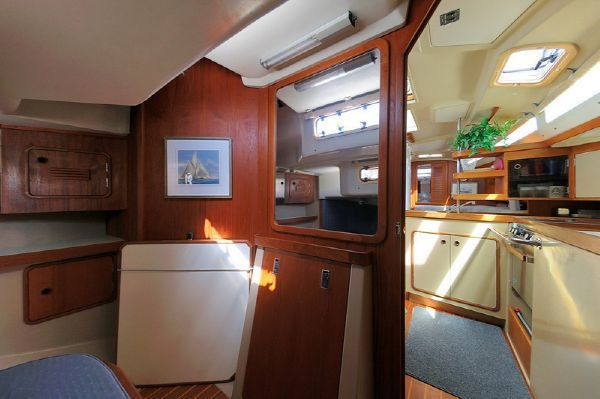
A view of the Aft Stateroom of a C&C 37/40 looking forward through the galley.

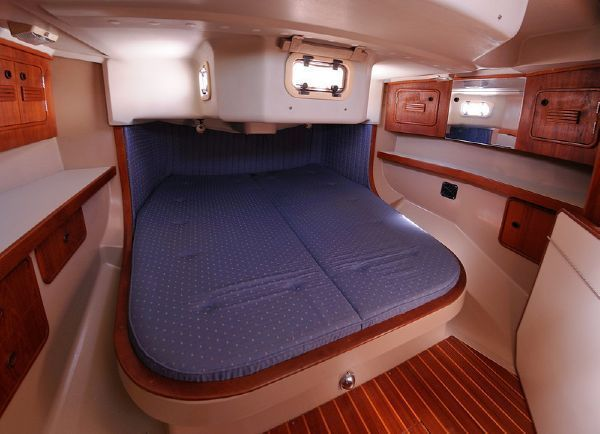
A view of the Aft Stateroom and Queen Berth of a C&C 37/40 looking aft.

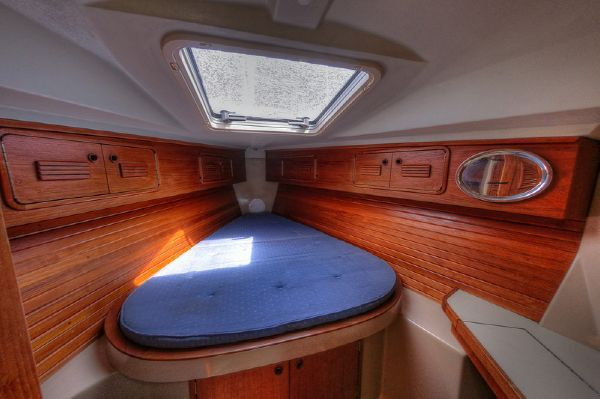
A view of the Forward Guest Stateroom of a C&C 37/40 looking forward.

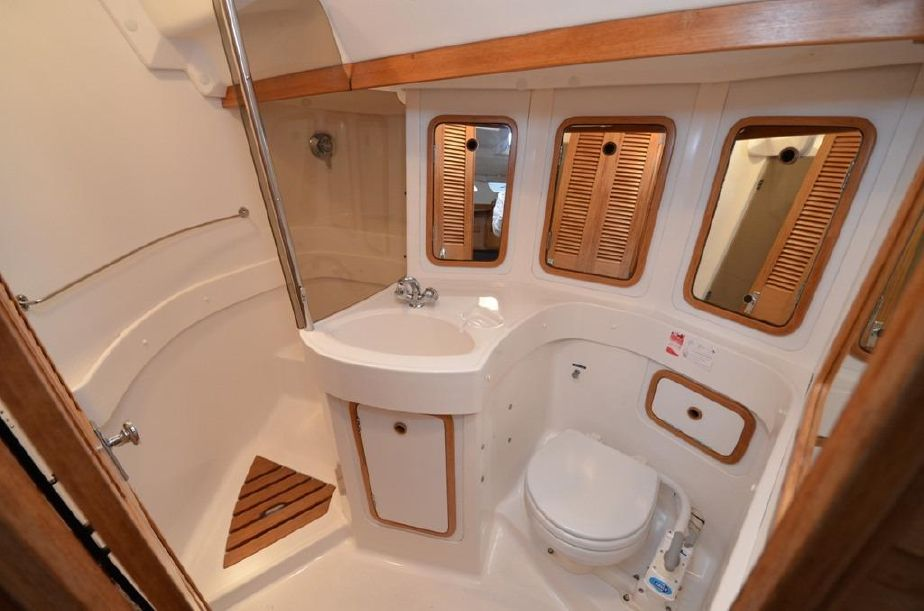
A view of the Heads of a C&C 37/40 looking aft to port.

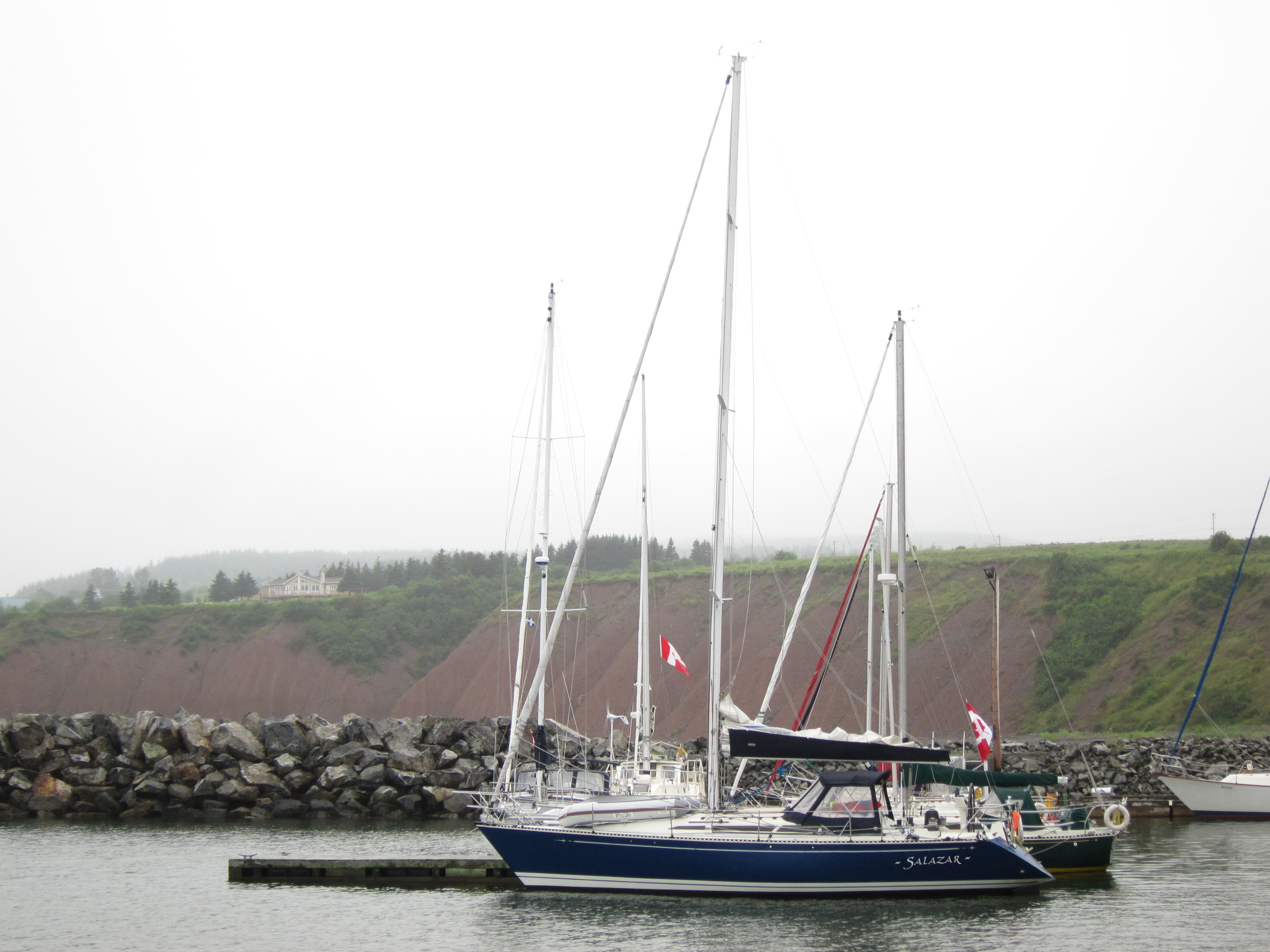
A C&C 37/40 XL lying at dock at Ballantynes Cove, Nova Scotia.

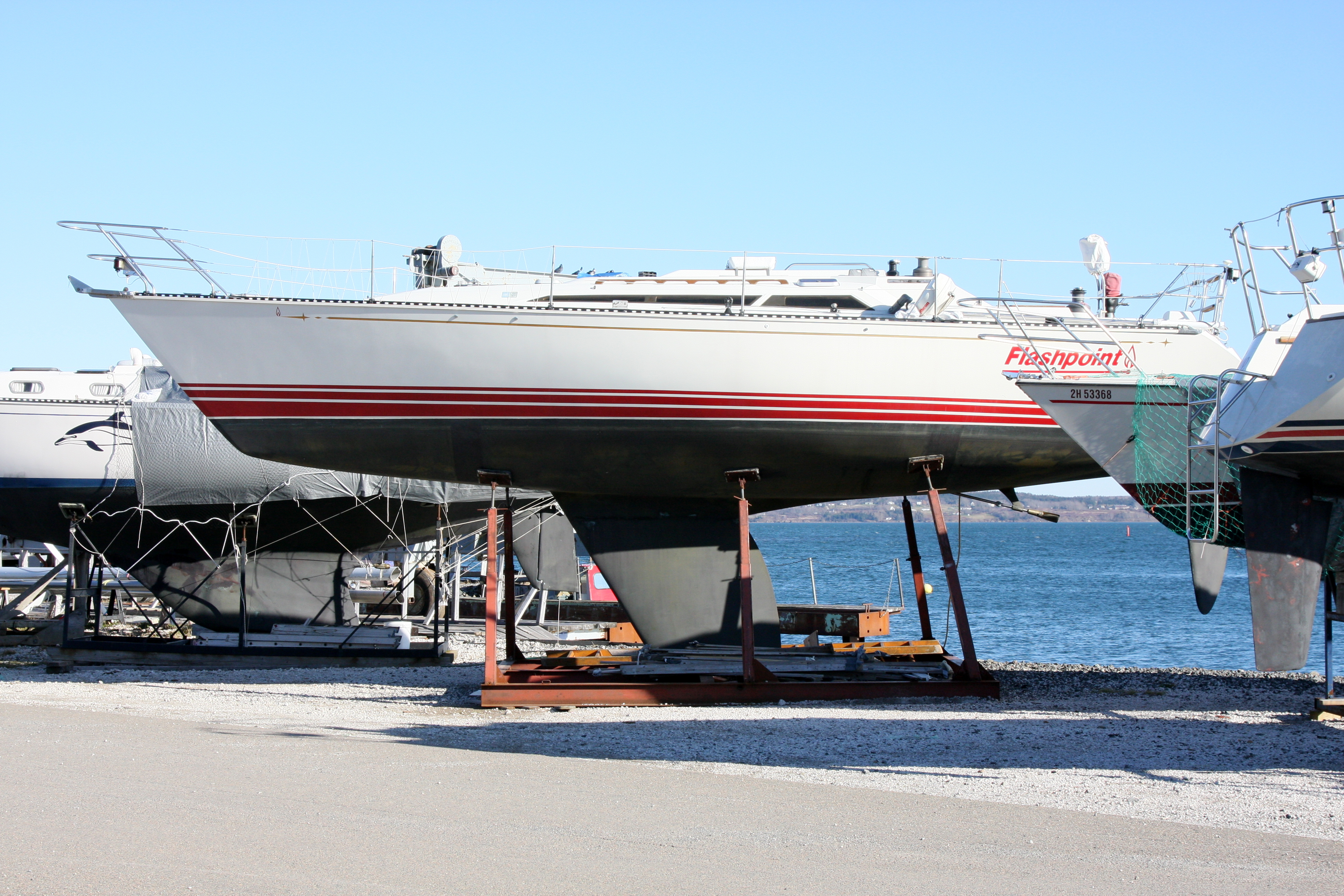
The C&C 37+ Flashpoint in her cradle at the Northern Yacht Club, North Sydney, NS.
