= C&C 57 =

Sailboat class

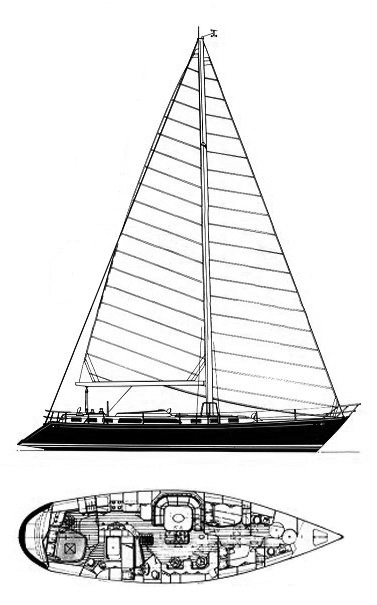

Development
- Location: Canada
- Builder: C&C Yachts
- Name: C&C 57

Boat
- Displacement: 45,700 lb (20,729 kg)
- Draft: 6.17 ft (1.88 m)

Hull
- Type: Monohull
- Construction: Fibreglass
- LOA: 57.00 ft (17.37 m)
- LWL: 43.00 ft (13.11 m)
- Beam: 15.50 ft (4.72 m)
- Engine: Perkins Engines diesel engine, 120 hp (89 kW)

Hull appendages
- Keel: fin keel
- Ballast: 17,700 lb (8,029 kg)
- Rudder: internally-mounted spade-type rudder

Rig
- Rig type: Bermuda rig

Sails
- Sailplan: Masthead sloop
- Total sail area: 1,313 sq ft (122.0 m^{2})

The C&C 57 is a Canadian sailboat. The design was built by C&C Yachts in Canada, but it is now out of production.

== Production ==
At least three examples were produced (based on Hull Identification Numbers (HIN) in the US Coast Guard database), the first, named Terica II, and the second, named "Showtime", both launched in 1988, with hull number 3, La Isla, completed in 1989.

== Design ==
The C&C 57 is a recreational keelboat, built predominantly of fibreglass. It has a masthead sloop rig, a raked stem, a raised reverse transom with built-in steps and swimming platform, and a centre cockpit. It displaces 45,700 lb (20,729 kg) and carries 17,700 lb (8,029 kg) of ballast.

The boat has a draft of 6.17 ft (1.88 m) with the standard keel installed. Total sail area is 1,313 sq ft (122.0 m^{2}).

=== Hull ===
One inch balsa core fiberglass sandwich construction consisting of triaxial fiberglass. Centerline structure is stiffened with a build-up of unidirectional roving. The exterior has a highly polished gelcoat finish. Additional unidirectional fab mat is employed in areas of high stress such as between the chainplates and the mast step. All interior bulkheads are structural members of marine grade plywood. They are fully bonded with fiberglass where adjoining the hull. This provides great structural integrity in the combined hull/deck interior structure, ensuring that the interior structure performs the dual function of providing accommodation and hull/deck stiffening.

=== Deck ===
Balsa core fiberglass sandwich construction similar to the hull using layers of unidirectional fabric. The balsa is replaced with high density core in the areas of major deck fittings. The deck is solidly bonded to the hull with fiberglass overlays, marine sealant and mechanical fastenings of stainless steel bolts in conjunction with the C&C toe rail.

=== Keel and rudder ===
The fixed fin keel carries ballast consisting of a lead casting alloyed with antimony for increased strength, bolted through the hull with stainless steel bolts through the reinforced fiberglass floors to spread the load over the hull.

The internally-mounted cantilevered balanced spade-type rudder is moulded of fiberglass and cored with foam. A stainless steel rudder post with welded stiffeners for the blade, passes through large diameter bearings which are strongly bonded to the hull. Steering is by a 48 in (120 cm) wheel.

== Accommodations ==
The boat was described as the most luxurious yacht in the C&C line in 1989.

=== Main saloon ===
The centre-cockpit companionway opens below into the main saloon with a large dining area which can seat ten people and also includes an entertainment centre, navigation station, additional occasional seating, and a 'day' head (powder room).

=== Galley ===
The galley includes a four-burner stove top, oven, microwave oven, molded one-piece sinks, teak cupboards, Avonite counters, a front opening refrigerator and ample storage.

=== Staterooms ===
In addition to the separate crew quarters opening off the main saloon there is an owner's stateroom aft with a queen-sized bed, vanity dresser, and full four-piece private head. There are also two separate staterooms forward for guests, each with private heads and shower stalls.

== Systems ==
=== Engine ===
The boat is fitted with a British Perkins Engines diesel engine of 120 hp (89 kW) for docking and maneuvering.

=== Fuel ===
Fuel tanks are custom fabricated of aluminum with 75 US gal (280 L) capacity each (total of 150 US gal (570 L)) with proper bafflings, fills, vents and outlets. All fuel lines are of quality hose with fuel filters, connected such that each fuel tank may be used separately.

=== Water ===
Water is stored in F.D.A. approved tanks holding 400 US gal (1,500 L) with on-deck fills. Two 12 US gal (45 L) hot water tanks will supply the required hot water.

== Optional equipment ==
Optional equipment included air conditioning, an ice making machine and a bow thruster for maneuvering.

== See also ==
- List of sailing boat types
