= Landfall 43 =

Sailboat class

Development
- Designer: Robert W. Ball, C&C Design
- Location: Canada
- Year: 1982
- Builder: C&C Yachts
- Name: Landfall 43

Boat
- Displacement: 24,600 lb (11,158 kg)
- Draft: 5.50 ft (1.68 m)

Hull
- Type: Monohull
- Construction: Fibreglass
- LOA: 42.08 ft (12.83 m)
- LWL: 34.42 ft (10.49 m)
- Beam: 12.62 ft (3.85 m)
- Engine: Westerbeke 58 hp (43 kW) diesel engine

Hull appendages
- Keel: fin keel
- Ballast: 9,075 lb (4,116 kg)
- Rudder: skeg-mounted rudder

Rig
- Rig type: Bermuda rig or ketch
- I foretriangle height: 50.00 ft (15.24 m)
- J foretriangle base: 17.00 ft (5.18 m)
- P mainsail luff: 42.50 ft (12.95 m)
- E mainsail foot: 16.30 ft (4.97 m)

Sails
- Sailplan: Masthead sloop
- Mainsail area: 346.38 sq ft (32.180 m^{2})
- Jib/genoa area: 425.00 sq ft (39.484 m^{2})
- Total sail area: 771.38 sq ft (71.664 m^{2})

The Landfall 43 is a Canadian sailboat that was designed by Robert W. Ball, the chief designer of C&C Design, and first built in 1982. The Landfall 43 was built with the charter trade in mind, to compete with Morgan and Whitby’s centre cockpit models. The Landfall series, begun with the Landfall 43's predecessor the Landfall 42, was part of a trend within C&C Yachts during the later 1970s and early 1980s to develop more cruising-oriented designs under company president George Cuthbertson's direction.

== Production ==
The design was built by the Canadian company C&C Yachts starting in 1982, but it is now out of production.

== Design ==
The Landfall 43 is a recreational keelboat, built predominantly of fibreglass, with wood trim. It has a masthead sloop rig or optionally a ketch rig, a centre cockpit, a raked stem, raised transom, a skeg-mounted rudder controlled by a wheel and a fixed fin keel. It displaces 24,600 lb (11,158 kg) and carries 9,075 lb (4,116 kg) of ballast.

The boat has a draft of 5.50 ft (1.68 m) with the standard keel fitted.

The boat is fitted with a Westerbeke diesel engine of 58 hp (43 kW). The fuel tank holds 70 U.S. gallons (260 L; 58 imp gal) and the fresh water tank has a capacity of 145 U.S. gallons (550 L; 121 imp gal).

The design has a hull speed of 7.86 kn (14.56 km/h).

=== Accommodations ===
Access to the aft cabin is through a companionway from the cockpit, or through an interior passageway with full standing headroom. The aft cabin is large, with a centre line double berth, a hanging locker plus other lockers, and private head with shower. There are four opening ports and an opening hatch for light and ventilation. The passageway forward has a workbench outboard (or optionally two sea berths) and engine access inboard.

Entering the saloon, the galley is to port, and the navigation station is just ahead. The large U-shaped galley has a refrigerator, double stainless steel sinks, a row of drawers, a hidden built-in disposal basket, a dry locker, and a three-burner propane stove with oven.

The saloon's U-shaped dinette converts to a double berth, with a settee across. There are six lockers behind the settees. Forward is a head, accessible from either the saloon or the forecabin. The forward cabin is a double and provides lockers, hanging lockers, and other storage. There are six opening ports, five opening hatches, and two dorade boxes forward for ventilation.

== See also ==
- List of sailing boat types
