= Bridge deck (disambiguation) =

Bridge deck may refer to

- Deck (bridge), the top surface of a bridge span
  - Orthotropic deck, a type of bridge deck
- Bridge deck, a raised forward section of a cockpit on a sailing vessel
- Deck of cards, used in the card game of bridge
- Deck department, a unit aboard naval and merchant ships
