= Route Halifax Saint-Pierre Ocean Race =

Sailboat race

- Official logo of the Route Halifax Saint-Pierre Ocean Race
- First held: 2002
- Organizer: ROUTE Saint-Pierre et Miquelon
- Start: Halifax, Nova Scotia
- Finish: Saint-Pierre, in the French archipelago of Saint-Pierre et Miquelon off of coastal Newfoundland
- Length: 350 nautical miles (650 km)
- Competitors: 25
- Legs: 1
- Champion: Esprit de Corps IV (2018)
- Website: www.routespm.com

Route Halifax Saint-Pierre Ocean Race is an ocean race held in late June or early July, every two years (in opposite years from the Marblehead to Halifax Ocean Race), from Halifax, Nova Scotia, Canada for a distance of approximately 350 nautical miles (650 km) to Saint-Pierre, in the French archipelago of Saint-Pierre et Miquelon off of coastal Newfoundland. It is raced by crews of two or more people, most commonly in sailboats in the 30 to 40 foot (9.1 to 12.2 m) range, but boats from 21 feet (6.4 m) to 60 feet (18 m) have been raced in the past.

The 2020 edition of the race will be the 10th time it has been contested. The race attracts both amateur and professional sailors from Canada, United States and Europe to compete on true time or under handicap rules in double-handed or fully crewed monohull boats. Winning times are often in the 36 to 48 hour range, but it can take more than 60 hours to complete the race. The race record time is currently 29 hours.

== History ==
Sailors Philippe Paturel and Hal Davies met while competing in North American sailing regattas. Davies, then retired as an officer in the Canadian Forces Maritime Command, was an active racer in the Royal Nova Scotia Yacht Squadron of Halifax, Nova Scotia, Canada. Davies and Paturel met and joked over a drink about the next opportunity to compete again in ocean racing, suggesting a race where the winner would be the first to arrive in Saint-Pierre. In 2002, as a result of their discussions, the Route Halifax/Saint-Pierre was established. It was first sponsored as a joint project of the Royal Nova Scotia Yacht Squadron in Halifax and the Yacht Club de Saint-Pierre. There were 20 boats entered in the first race, with 40 sailboats of all sizes in later years.

The race is run every two years, starting at the Royal Nova Scotia Yacht Squadron in Halifax.

Davies died in February 2011, but the race he helped to found continues to be run.

== The race ==
The scheduled day for the 2020 Route Halifax Saint-Pierre start is Friday, June 26, at the Maritime Museum of the Atlantic on the Halifax city waterfront. The First gun for the start of Route Halifax Saint-Pierre 2020 is at 1155 hrs.

By July, the winds in the region are dominated by the Azores High and historically this has resulted in a 75% chance of moderate (11–16 knot) winds aft of the beam for ideal sailing conditions. Records of the seven races indicate that six have tended to be fast with boats with a Performance Handicap Racing Fleet (PHRF) rating of 75 finishing with an elapsed time ranging from 47 to 56 hours. But, there was one slow race where an equivalent boat took 80 hours to finish.

The race receives a warm welcome from the residents of Saint-Pierre. Local families each adopt a racing crew and there is live music at the completion of the race, all part of the French national holiday, Bastille Day on July 14.

=== Race record ===
The race record is held by Derek Hatfield's Open 60 "Spirit of Canada" which in 2010 set an elapsed time of 29 hours, 43 minutes, 56 seconds.

== Awards (2020) ==
The André H. Paturel Trophy is awarded to the first monohull to finish Route Halifax Saint-Pierre on elapsed time.

The USHIP Trophy is awarded to the first Multihull to finish ROUTE Halifax SaintPierre on elapsed time.

The Founders’ Trophy is awarded to the best team of two monohulls in Route Halifax Saint-Pierre scored under ORC.

The État Français trophy is awarded to the best boat in any monohull division of Route Halifax Saint-Pierre sailed by a crew of two, scored under ORC.

The Hal Davies Memorial Trophy (2012) is awarded to the best monohull in Route Halifax Saint-Pierre, scored under ORC, where the Person in Charge is entering for the first time.

The Trophée SPM 1ère is awarded to the boat providing the best on board, or race-related, reporting.

The Friar Trophy is awarded for the best combined finish in both the Route Halifax Saint-Pierre Ocean Race and the Marblehead to Halifax Ocean Race in consecutive years.

=== Division and class prizes (2020) ===
- The Georges Acland Trophy is awarded to the best boat in Division I – Ocean Class
- The Trophée de Saint-Pierre et Miquelon – Des îles d'exception is awarded to the best boat in Division I – Class 40
- The SNSM Trophy is awarded to the best boat in Division I – Multi 50
- The Trophée de la Ville de Saint-Pierre is awarded to the best boat in Division II – ORC-Racing
- The Trophée de la Collectivité Territoriale de Saint-Pierre et Miquelon is awarded to the best boat in Division III – ORC-Non-Spinnaker
