= Robert W. Ball =

Canadian yacht designer (1943–2022)

Robert Wilson Ball
- Born: August 24, 1943; Ottawa, Ontario, Canada
- Died: September 9, 2022 (aged 79)
- Citizenship: Canadian, US permanent resident
- Education: Naval Architect
- Alma mater: University of Michigan
- Occupation: Naval Architect
- Years active: 1969–2022
- Employers: C&C Yachts; Concordia Custom Yachts; Edson International
- Known for: Chief in-house designer at C&C Yachts from 1973 to 1991
- Predecessor: George Cuthbertson
- Successor: Tim Jacket
- Spouse: Patricia Ball
- Children: Bria Knowles; Dayton Ball; Kira L'Heureux
- Parents: Robert W. Ball (father); Helen (mother)
- Awards: 2011 Legends of Ontario Sailing Award

Robert Wilson Ball (August 24, 1943 – September 9, 2022) was a Canadian yacht designer, based in Port Credit, Ontario, and later, New Bedford, Massachusetts. Ball was the chief in-house designer and Vice President of Design at C&C Yachts from 1973 to 1991.

== Career ==
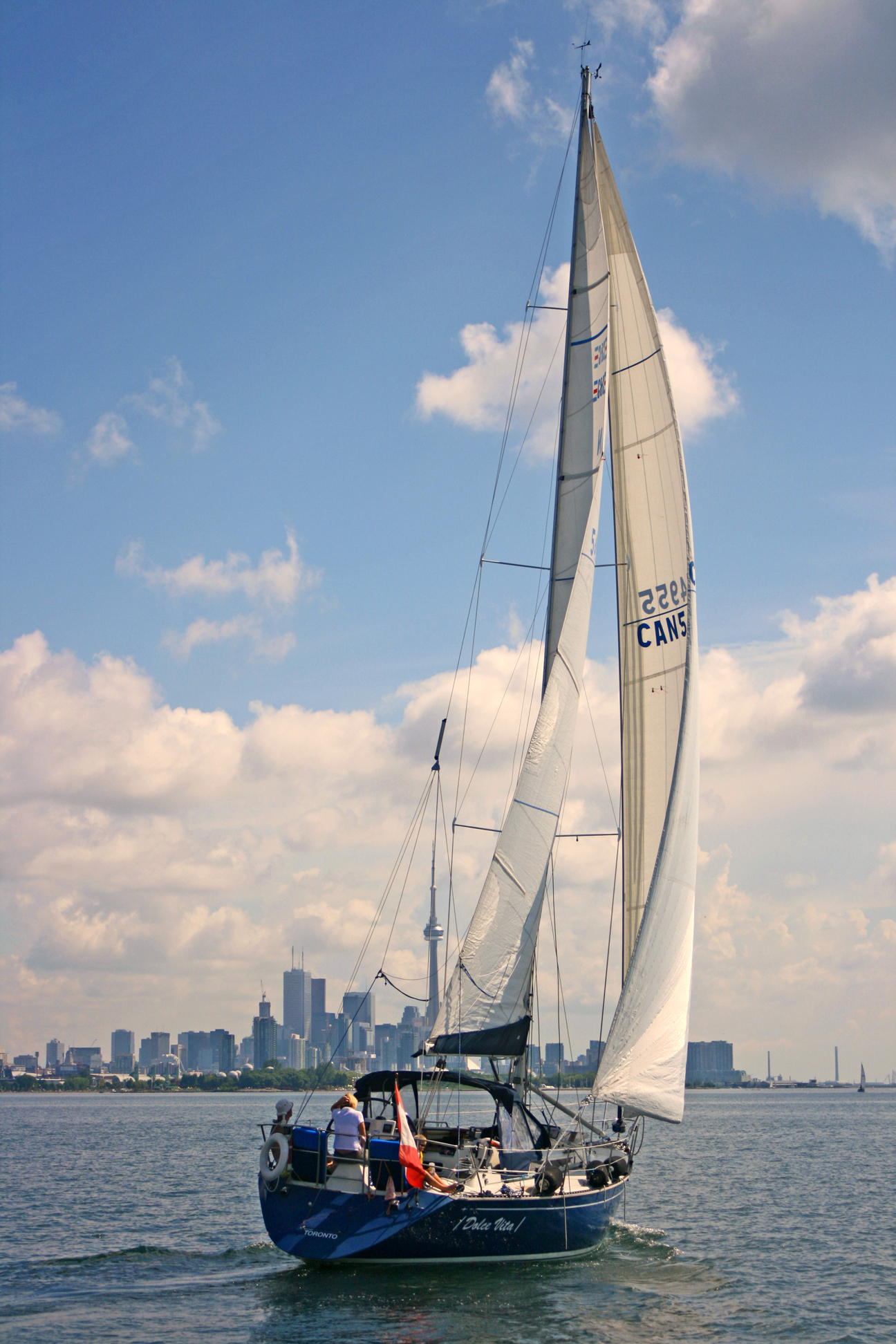
C&C 37/40 designed by Ball

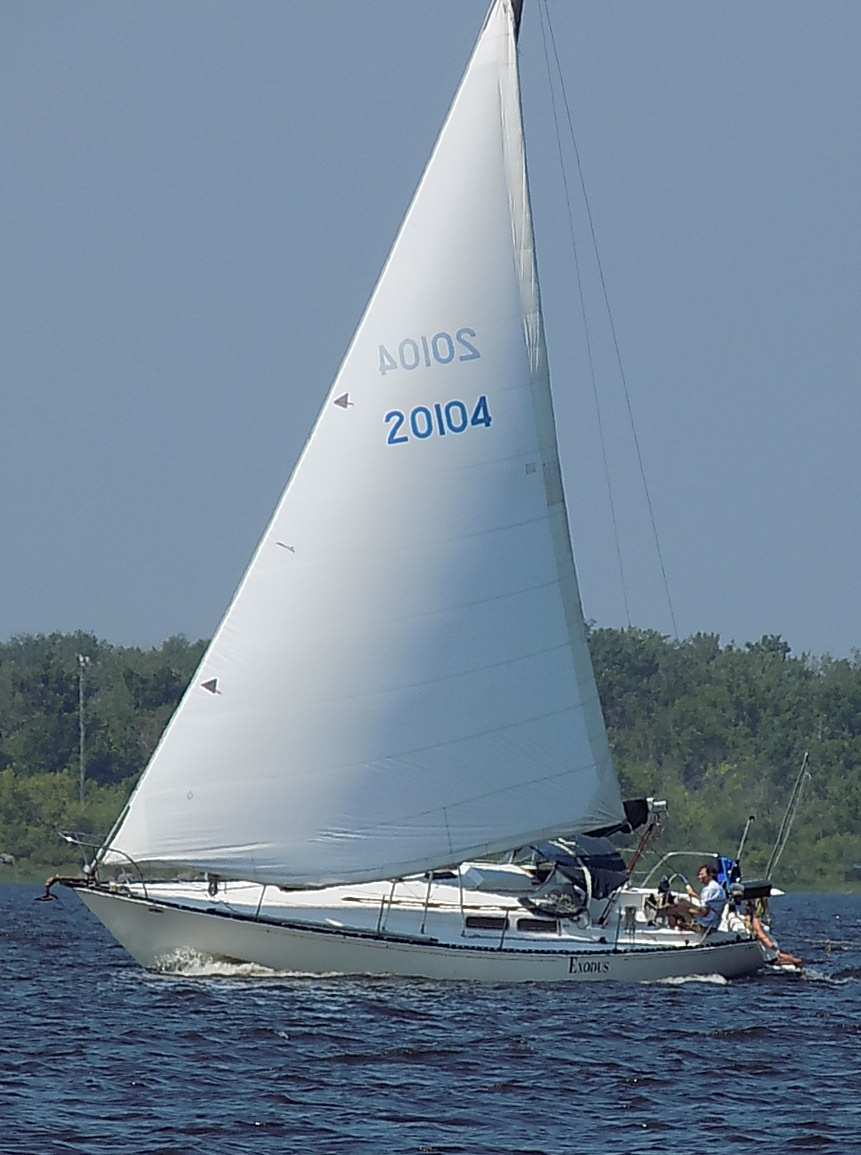
C&C 33 designed by Ball

Robert Ball joined C&C Yachts in 1966 as a summer employee while he was still in school, studying Naval Architecture and Marine Engineering at the University of Michigan's College of Engineering. As soon as he graduated in 1969 George Cuthbertson hired him. Cuthbertson soon had Ball designing masts and mast fittings, and soon after that he handed Ball hull structural design.

=== Chief Designer at C&C Yachts ===
Ball was promoted to Chief Designer at C&C Yachts in May 1973. As head of design his first couple of hull designs were essentially re-works of existing hulls with minor changes. His first design undertaken from a ‘clean sheet’ was the C&C 33 done in the spring of 1974, a high performance design, fitting the three-quarter ton size. This design would race well and re-establish C&C's image on the race courses. An early 33 was shipped to Europe (to be used by Baltic Yachts for their production) and it was entered in the Three-Quarter Ton Cup that was in Norway that year. In the first two races they placed well and in the third race took first place, unusual for a production boat with a full interior up against race boats. In a speech given at the Legends of Ontario Sailing Award – Ontario Sailing Gala on Saturday, April 2, 2011, fellow designer Robert Mazza reflected on Ball's high-performance yacht designs:

Under Rob Ball’s design leadership Canada was well represented by C&C Yachts in Admirals Cup Racing, including the 1979 Fastnet race, in Onion Patch Racing, which included the Newport Bermuda Race, and several Canada's Cup Races, not to mention innumerable races on Long Island Sound, all the Great Lakes (including Superior), and wherever two or more boats would gather to race or cruise. Classic production and custom boats like the C&C 33, 34, 35 and C&C 40 and 41s, Amazing Grace, Magistri, Silver Shadow, Charisma, Archangel, and many more came off Rob’s drawing board and out of the design office under Rob’s supervision.

Throughout the 1970s C&C's design group also created boats for other builders, such as the Great Lakes 33 trawler, built by Ontario Yachts. John Atkin was always publicly credited as the designer, but its lines were drawn by C&C's Rob Ball.

By 1985, under Ball's supervision, C&C's design office had grown to eleven staff, with new designers spending time with plans for the archives, familiarizing themselves with the company's design history. By the time these up and coming designers were entrusted with a critical design job, such as the deck of a new model, they had been immersed in the C&C design philosophy. Putting compatible designers together was one of Ball's strengths. Ball was in charge of the overall hull design and the basic conceptional design, while another designer was in charge of structures. George Cassian's expertise was in interiors. Another staff member was familiar with computers and converted much of the basic design and keel design drafting work to a computer program. Each person on the team had a specialty, but they were also all project engineers to provide depth and also keep them each engaged in the projects. In this way they could keep tabs on a particular project and each staff member could get a little more personally invested in that particular boat design.

In an interview for The Yacht magazine in 1985 Ball commented in the difference between designing for custom projects compared to the building of production boats:

“A production boat is more challenging. A grand prix race boat is more emotionally interesting, but not so challenging. The production boat is three times more complex."

Robert Ball gave a speech at the Royal Canadian Yacht Club's tribute to George Cuthbertson, where he expanded on this idea, saying:

As much as custom designs were notable, it was production boats that paid our way, and George imbibed the message – that they are much more challenging design-wise, since performance is important, but attractiveness, and practicality for the builder and the sailor was actually the key to successful designs. George was key in helping me balance the various factors that would result in many people wanting to sail our boats.

=== Changes at C&C ===
By the late 1980s there had been changes at C&C Yachts and the number of staff in the design department had been reduced. Quoting a 1988 review in Sailing Magazine by Robert Perry (yacht designer) of the then new C&C 37R:

I called Rob Ball, head designer at C&C, to talk about the 37R. Rob said that once in a great while you get a boat that does everything perfectly, i.e. floats level, balances well, looks good, goes fast ... and sells. The new C&C 37R is just that boat. The boat has proved so fast that orders for the racing model have totally overwhelmed the orders for the more subdued cruise-race model. It appears that C&C is back in their old groove of producing high performance boats.

Much of the credit for this success must go to the C&C design team. Hull design is handled by Rob Ball, accommodations by Rob Ball, deck design and layout by Rob Ball and rig and general engineering by Rob Ball. You see, the team is not as big as it used to be, but the success of the 37R is testimony to the fact that perhaps Ball's talents were being diluted by the input of too many other in-house, competing designers in the past.

In September 1990 Robert Ball left C&C Yachts to join Concordia Custom Yachts (Concordia Company), in Padanaram, Massachusetts, but continued to do design work for C&C International as RWB Design until the Niagara-on-the-Lake factory fire destroyed molds, boats under construction, and facilities in 1994, essentially putting C&C out of business in Canada.

== Later life and death ==
Robert Ball joined Edson International in New Bedford, Massachusetts in 1993. Ball had perfected his use of computer-aided design (CAD) during his 25 years at C&C and his tenure at the Concordia Company so he used his knowledge to guide the company's changeover to truly computerized design and engineering functions. Until his death in 2022 Robert Ball continued as Chief Design Engineer at Edson International.

Ball died on September 9, 2022, at the age of 79.

== Landmark designs ==
In 1985 the then president of C&C Yachts, David Gee said, "Rob Ball has more boats on the water than most other naval architects that you can name." A quote from Robert Ball:

We once counted boat's and came to 7,454 boat's built to my design. That does not include the three Boston Whalers - the Harpoon 4.6, 5.2, and 6.2. Not sure how many - I have 5.2 number 508. And a number of Windsurfers - I'm sure a few thousand. And a row boat - "The Pocket Rowing Skiff" - we built 50, and I see it is still being built (by Rossiter Boats)

=== C&C 38 (1975) ===
Introduced in 1975, the 38 was a true racer-cruiser, the design performed well racing, had good middle-of-the-road stability, and came with a well appointed interior. The resulting demand in the market indicated this was the perfect size for the cruiser who wanted a roomy boat below but did not want a boat that was too much to handle while sailing. With 98 boats sold, it was C&C's biggest-seller of 1976.

=== C&C 40 (1977) ===
The company's success with the 38 allowed C&C to develop a somewhat larger boat for the market, a design that proved to be one of the most profitable projects in the company's history. First launched as a limited series production design, interest in the 40 was initially low—C&C had been beaten to the market by boats like the North American 40 (which it had been approached to build under contract), Swan 411, Islander 40 and Tartan 41.

Initially built by the C&C Yachts Custom Division in Oakville, Ontario, the owners of these products of Erich Bruckmann's shop were free to experiment with interior layout (a number of these original owners, with racing foremost in their mind, experimented to the point of ordering yachts with virtually no interior layout to speak of), as well as with the options of a taller rig or deeper keel. The C&C 40, in turn, became the most thorough in-water and custom testing program ever undertaken by the company. In all, 19 40-footers were crafted by the custom division before the design was promoted to production status at the Niagara-on-the-Lake plant. The first 11 were built without interior liners, and many features experimented with on these and subsequent custom-produced boats found their way into the production model. Some of the most comprehensive and beneficial in-water testing was derived from Amazing Grace, owned by Robert Herron of Port Credit, Ontario, through her performance at the SORC.

The C&C 40's reputation was made on Long Island Sound, a hotbed of racing activity and a traditionally strong market area for the Canadian Company's products in that era. The first two 40s to sail on the Sound were named Coyote and On Rush. They were campaigned strenuously by a pair of rival sail lofts, the result of which was some first-rate competition and some equally first-rate public exposure to the new design. In short time, market interest snowballed for a product that had been delayed going into the first phase of its development plan by a lack of orders.

In all 167 were built at a 25 per cent profit margin, which helped offset the company's difficulty building models under 30 feet profitability. The 40 was a major success for C&C in the tough Long Island Sound market, where an association just for C&C 40 owners was formed.

=== Evergreen (1977) ===
The Canada's Cup winner in 1978 was a C&C design, the Two Ton class Evergreen, owned by Don Green with Hans Fogh at the helm. The design was a radical, dinghy-like, 41-foot boat, designed with the aim of winning the trophy as the C&C design team had exploited loopholes in the regatta rules. As one example, the galley was required to have sink but, in order to save weight, it had no drain, which the rule makers had not thought to specify. The deck hatches opened inward, which could be a safety hazard if they gave way during a capsize or broach, and the Evergreen crew faced protests over this defect in both the SORC and in the Canada's Cup. Upon reflection over the 1979 Fastnet race in which he participated, Skipper Green later said that Evergreen "never should have gone to England" for the Admiral's Cup, which is the destination of most Canada's Cup winners. Canadian Yachting magazine stated fifteen years later that "few yachts have created more controversy than" Evergreen, and that "its extreme design and controversial features ruffled feathers around the world." After the competition that year, the rule books were rewritten to preclude safety problems like those raised by the design of Evergreen, and as a result, C&C never received another commission for a Canada's Cup yacht.

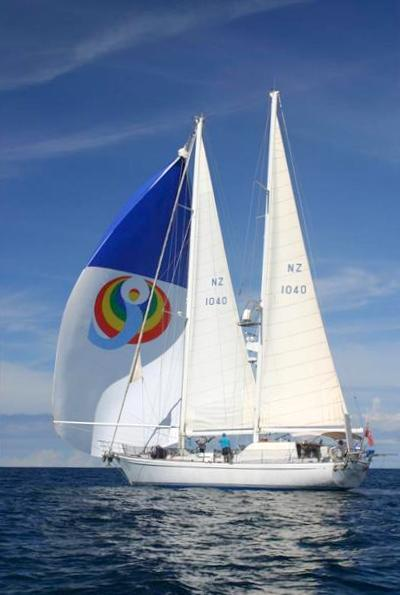
C&C Custom 67 Archangel

=== Archangel (1980) ===
The C&C Custom 67 Archangel was designed by Robert Ball and was launched in September 1980. She was commissioned by Michael Davies, publisher of the Kingston Whig-Standard newspaper who participated in the design process. He wanted a cruising yacht large enough to voyage anywhere in the world in comfort, but requiring only a small crew. This resulted in the schooner rig being chosen for Archangel as it divides the sails up into more manageable sizes. She remains the largest pleasureboat commission ever received by C&C, and was an enormous project—six months in design and 14 months in construction.

Archangel was built by C&C Yachts Custom Division. She is a yacht built for comfortable living, she was made to be as independent of land as possible through such features as two sources of AC power, desalinators, an enormous freezer, and a pair of dinghies. Davies, along with family and friends sailed Archangel over 90,000 mi (144,841 km) in the period from 1980 to 1991, visiting dozens of countries along the way.

Archangel later became Sir Peter Blake and Lady Blake's family yacht. During this period Sir Blake used her as his command boat for Team New Zealand through their successful defence of the America's Cup in 2000.

Michael Bundock, a member of the Royal New Zealand Yacht Squadron, purchased Archangel from Lady Blake in Barcelona in 2004. Bundock then spent about two years sailing her halfway around the world, eventually taking her back to his home in New Zealand. Archangel is currently based in Auckland and is sailed regularly on the Hauraki Gulf. Her sail numbers are now NZL1040.

=== Magistri (1982) ===
Magistri, a custom 39-footer, was designed and built for Peter Farlinger, a racing yachtsman of considerable experience. Magistri was targeted to the heavy air conditions expected in a typical Admiral's Cup series and was built to high standards of Kevlar, foam, and carbon fibre.

Her debut brought overall victory in the Lake Erie Race followed by good performances in both Mackinacs. She then dominated the New York fall series of races with three straight firsts and was doing well in the Southern Ocean Racing Conference (SORC) when a dismasting in the Miami/Nassau Race ended her bid in this prestigious event.

Selected as one of the three boats making up the 1983 Canadian Admiral's Cup team (all C&Cs and all three Robert Ball designs) she won the Channel Race overall – the first-ever overall win by a Canadian yacht in an Admiral's Cup event. Her final series placing was sixth in fleet, also a best-ever for Canadian sailors.

A quote from Robert Ball:

Magistri was maybe my best triumph . . . . .

Peter asked me for a heavy weather upwind design specifically for the Admiral’s Cup. His feeling was that a bunch of Toronto sailors had sailed in light air a lot and would be better than the Brits in those conditions . . . . . so, if I could deliver a heavy weather boat, they could be competitive across the board. Even Big George questioned my ability to accomplish same . . . . . I was at my prime, and the design of the boat came true . . . . .

In England the heavy weather characteristics paid off. In the Channel Race Magistri won - probably my best ever result because against the best in the world, with a normal amateur crew.

Farlinger sailed her exclusively offshore, and only for a short period, before selling her to Jacob Wallenberg of Stockholm, Sweden. Renamed Insdispensible II Wallenberg campaigned her successfully and competed as a member of the Swedish Admiral's Cup team in 1985.

Magistri was a small, ocean racer that reaffirmed there was more to C&C's design touch than a wildcard like Evergreen.

=== C&C 44 (1985) ===
The C&C 44 was a solid top end to the C&C product line. With the fin keel version drawing more than eight feet, C&C offered a centreboard configuration to reduce draft to five feet, four in. The 44 continued a C&C tradition for nicely proportioned boats.

In a July 1988 review, Lloyd Hircock wrote in Canadian Yachting magazine, "The C&C 44 is a splendid sea boat—dry, kindly, strong and seaworthy ... I rate the C&C 44 up there with the best of them. It is an impressive yacht to sail. It is strong and capable, and well designed for safe offshore passages for comfortable lake cruising. At the drop of a flag this design is ready to take to the race course." He did find fault with the inadequate cabin ventilation, the uncomfortable helm seat, as well as the aft genoa sheet track location and the location of the mainsheet traveller in the middle of the cockpit, which reduces cockpit seating space.

=== Landfall series ===
While C&C Yachts was known for its high-performance yachts, primarily building straight racers or racer-cruisers, Robert Ball's C&C Landfall series was conceived and marketed as performance cruisers. Launched in the late 1970s they were ahead of their time and so were not as commercially successful as they should have been, as many cruising sailors at the time still favoured heavier more traditional designs. In comparison, today most new cruising designs feature a performance-oriented hull shape, often with shoal draft. Maintenance is kept to a minimum, especially externally. These same criteria define the C&C Landfall series dating from almost 40 years ago.

The Landfall 38 was the highest-produced model in the Landfall series, with about 180 units built between 1979 and 1985. It continues to be used by coastal and bluewater cruisers, and examples can be found in various cruising regions worldwide.

A Cruising World poll in 2013 elected the Landfall 38 as number 29 in their list of 40 greatest production monohulls of all time.

== Awards ==
Robert Ball was awarded the Canadian Yachting Magazine, Ontario Sailing, 2011 Legends of Ontario Sailing Award as one of the “Builders of C&C Yachts”

== Boat designs ==
- The Pocket Rowing Skiff
- Baltic 33
- Baltic 37
- Baltic 39
- Baltic 42
- Baltic 51
- C&C 25 MKII
- C&C 26 Wave
- C&C 27 MK I
- C&C 27 MK II
- C&C 27 MK III
- C&C 27 MK V
- C&C 3/4 Ton
- C&C 30-2
- C&C 33
- C&C 33-2
- C&C 34
- C&C 34+DK
- C&C 34+R
- C&C 35-3
- C&C 37
- C&C 37-2
- C&C 37/40 R
- C&C 37/40 XL
- C&C 37/40+
- C&C 38-2
- C&C 40-2
- C&C 40-2 AC
- C&C 41
- C&C 43-2
- C&C 44
- C&C 44 Custom
- C&C 51 Custom
- C&C 52 Custom 1978
- C&C 53
- C&C Custom 67
- Harpoon 4.6
- Harpoon 5.2
- Harpoon 6.2
- Landfall 35 (C&C)
- Landfall 38 (C&C)
- Landfall 43 (C&C)
- Northeast 39
- Northeast 39-2
- Trapper 500/501

== See also ==
- List of sailboat designers and manufacturers
