= C&C Custom 67 =

Canadian sailboat

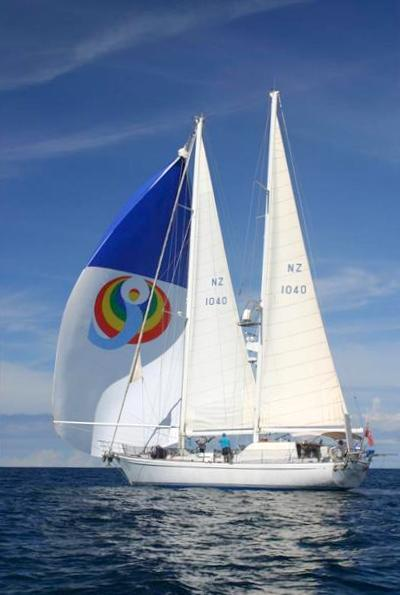
- C&C Custom 67 Archangel

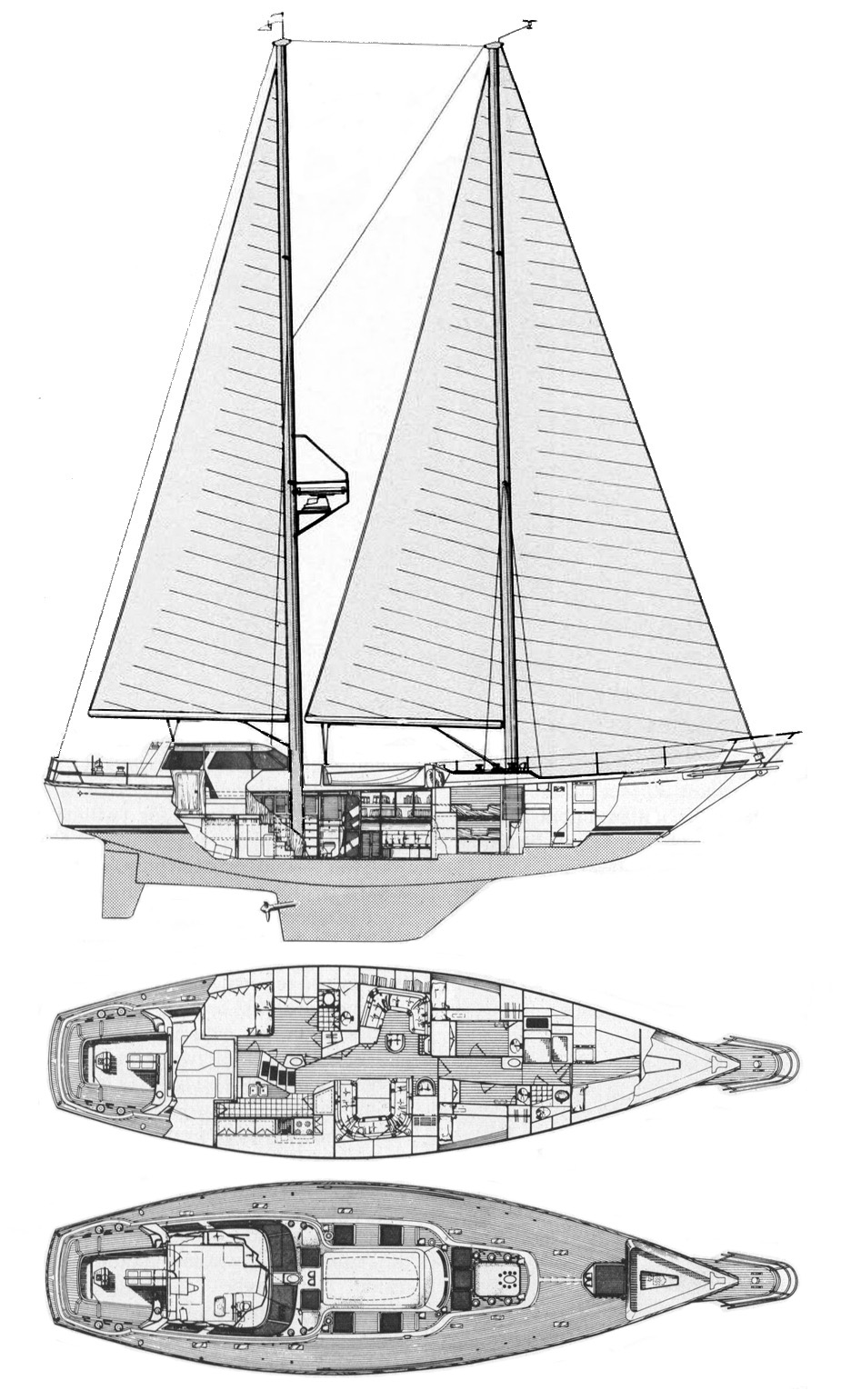

Development
- Designer: Robert W. Ball, C&C Yachts
- Location: Canada
- Year: 1980
- No. built: 1
- Builder: C&C Yachts Custom Division
- Role: World cruising yacht

Boat
- Displacement: 98,700 lb (44,770 kg)
- Draft: 10.5 ft (3.2 m)
- Air draft: 78.5 ft (23.9 m)

Hull
- Type: Monohull
- Construction: Fiberglass
- LOA: 73.00 ft (22.25 m)
- LOH: 67.00 ft (20.42 m)
- LWL: 58.00 ft (17.68 m)
- Beam: 18.33 ft (5.59 m)
- Engine: Inboard diesel engine Volvo TAMD 70C replaced with a Caterpillar Inc. 3208 210 hp (157 kW) diesel engine (1992)

Hull appendages
- Keel: Swept fin keel
- Ballast: lead 35,274 lb (16,000 kg)
- Rudders: Internally-mounted, partial skeg hung rudder

Rig
- Rig type: Bermuda schooner

Sails
- Sailplan: Masthead schooner
- Mainsail area: 577 sq ft (53.6 m^{2})
- Jib/genoa area: 816 sq ft (75.8 m^{2})
- Other sails: Foresail 577 sq ft (53.6 m^{2}). Main staysail 890 sq ft (83 m^{2})
- Downwind sail area: 6,000 sq ft (560 m^{2})
- Total sail area: 2,860 sq ft (266 m^{2})

The C&C Custom 67 is a Canadian sailboat, that was designed by Robert W. Ball of C&C Yachts and was launched and named Archangel in September 1980. She remains the largest pleasure boat commission ever received by C&C, and epitomized a trend within C&C during the later 1970s and early 1980s toward more cruising-oriented designs under George Cuthbertson's direction, a trend best illustrated by the development of the Landfall series.

== Design ==
The C&C Custom 67 Archangel is a recreational keelboat, intended primarily for world cruising. She was commissioned by Michael Davies, publisher of the Kingston Whig-Standard newspaper, who Cuthbertson knew quite well. Davies participated extensively in the design and build process. He wanted a cruising yacht large enough to voyage anywhere in the world in comfort, but requiring only a small crew.

Davies had very clear ideas what he wanted in Archangel. He wanted a boat with uncompromising windward ability; a boat that he would not have to motorsail, or worse yet, power, whenever the wind came ahead. This resulted in the schooner rig being chosen for Archangel, resulting in a boat that goes to wind as well as a sloop rig, but also allows Archangel's vast sail area to be distributed about the boat in manageable proportions.

Davies wanted a dry boat, which required an aft-cockpit layout. He also decided that watchkeepers should have access to the radar, navigation instruments, and the plot, without having to go below where they are cut off from all else that may be going on in the world. Such a requirement evolved into a pilothouse, which allowed the option of inside steering and gave the aft open cockpit considerable shelter from spray.

As a final requirement, Davies wanted a boat that would be as independent of shore and shore facilities as possible. That was met with a rig strong enough (in theory) to allow Archangel to carry on, in 50 knots of wind, massive tankage, two sources of AC power, desalinators, a huge freezer and two dinghies.

== Production ==
The boat was built by Erich Bruckmann and his crew at C&C Yachts Custom Division in Oakville, Ontario, Canada. Archangel was an enormous project—six months in design and 14 months in construction. Only one example was completed.

=== Construction ===
Archangel is built predominantly of fiberglass with a balsa core, and finished with wood trim. She is flush decked with an aft cockpit and helm, as well as a substantial pilothouse with internal helm, navigation area and pilot berth. The fin keel is externally bolted with lead ballast encapsulated in GRP. The spade rudder is fitted with a partial skeg. She has teak decks and bulwarks. The deckbox (a covered well between the masts) accommodates a 11.0 ft (3.4 m) RIB dinghy with a 25 hp (19 kW) outboard motor. She is also equipped with two eight-man liferafts.

=== Masts and rigging ===
Archangel is configured as a Bermudian schooner. The rig is powerful and flexible and is equipped with furling systems and powered self-tailing winches designed to facilitate sailing with a smaller crew. Both spars, the mainmast and foremast (each weighing 2,100 lb (953 kg)), have electric roller furling with manual back up. All standing rigging is Navtec discontinuous stainless steel rod. There is a Navtec control console for vangs and mainmast backstay control. There are two carbon Spinnaker poles on deck.

=== Sails and sail handling ===
When first launched her sails were Hood Eclipse ultraviolet-resistant cloth. The main and foresail are an identical 577 sq ft (53.6 m^{2}) (She only qualifies as a schooner because the after mast is stepped on foot higher than the fore.) These two sails reef and furl into Hood Stoway spars equipped with electric roller furling with manual back up. The 816 sq ft (75.8 m^{2}) foresail has Hood Sea Furl manual roller furling assisted by the powered Barient winches (also with manual back up). The four self-tailing Barinet primary and secondary winches surrounding the cockpit are also electrically driven, again with manual back up just in case. Working sail area is 2,000 sq ft (190 m^{2}) and a crew of three can have all working sails set and flying (or furled) in under 15 minutes.

Thanks to the adjustments possible with the roller rig, Archangel can be balanced under any conditions. In heavy weather, her 9.8-oz man would be completely furled, leaving as much of the 17-oz. foresail as required to balance the 10.5-oz. jib rolled down to storm size.

For light airs, Archangel carries a 7-oz. genoa, an 890 sq ft (83 m^{2}) main staysail, and a spinnaker, allowing her to set 6,000 sq ft (560 m^{2}) of sail for downwind sailing.

=== Accommodations ===
Archangel has extensive interior joinery of teak with white painted bulkheads, cabin soles of teak and holly, and deckheads strip planked in cedar. She has a master stateroom which includes a large double aft cabin with en-suite heads equipped with a shower, baths, and sauna.

There is a comprehensive galley equipped with a dual fridge/freezer system, stainless steel gimballed 4-burner cooker with oven, microwave, and two stainless steel sinks.

The large saloon has a fireplace, two sitting areas (one with a gimballed table for dining at sea), and a navigation station.

Forward of the saloon are two twin guest cabins plus an additional guest or crew cabin in the forepeak with an access hatch to the foredeck.

=== Systems ===
Main engine: Originally launched with a 235 hp (175 kW) turbo-charged Volvo TAMD 70C inboard diesel engine (replaced in 1992 with a Caterpillar Inc. 3208 210 hp (157 kW) diesel engine) fitted with a Hundested hydraulic gear box which drives a 3 blade variable pitch propeller, controlled from both the pilot house and cockpit. Cruising speed: 7.0 kn (13.0 km/h), Maximum speed: 11 kn (20 km/h). Also installed is an American Marine dual station proportional control bow thruster 12–25 hp (9–19 kW) fitted in 1992. There are five fuel tanks with a total capacity of 2,592 L (570 imp gal; 685 US gal).

Electrics: Westerbeke 15 kW 120 / 240 V generator, a 150 A engine alternator, a 60 A engine alternator.

Navigation equipment:

In pilot house:

- Furuno FR8100D 72 mile daylight radar
- Robertson 8P45HD autopilot
- Gyro compass
- Trimble Navgraphic XL GPS chartplotter, interfaced with radar and autopilot
- Radar angle indicator
- Brooks & Gatehouse (B&G) wind indicator
- Two B&G Hydra 2 Multi Function Displays (MFD)
- B&G electronic compass
- Stephens Sea 156 VHF radio
- Numerous displays for hydraulics and mechanical systems

In cockpit:

- Two B&G 20/20 displays
- B&G wind direction
- Radar angle indicator
- Ritchie steering compass in stainless binnacle
- Horn

Navigation station in saloon:

- Stephens Sea 156 VHF
- Stephens Sea 225 SSB
- ICOM IC 735 SSB
- Trimble Transpak II GPS
- B&G Hydra 2 MFD

HVAC: Two chilled water Lumaire reverse cycle air conditioning units of 3 ton and 2 ton capacity, and two Espar 7.5 kW diesel heaters.

Water supply: Three fresh water tanks total capacity 1,377 L (303 imp gal; 364 US gal), Sea Fresh watermaker, output 113 L (25 imp gal; 30 US gal)/hour and a stainless steel 75 L (16 imp gal; 20 US gal) hot water heater.

Ground tackle:

- Maxwell 4000 electric anchor windlass with foot control switch
- Bruce 135 lb (61 kg) anchor
- CQR 105 lb (48 kg) anchor

== Operational history ==
After her launch, Archangel spent the best part of a month in Oakville harbor, working through her sailing and powering trials and being labored over by most of the C&C Custom Division staff. The work crew often included Davies, who enjoyed being cross-examined about himself and his boat by onlookers who assumed he was a workman. By September 1981 Davies and his family had already voyaged from Canada to Bermuda and on to the Virgin Islands.

Davies, along with family and friends sailed Archangel over 90,000 mi (144,841 km) in the period from 1980 to 1991, visiting dozens of countries along the way.

Archangel later became Sir Peter Blake and Lady Blake's family yacht. During this period Sir Peter used her as his command boat for Team New Zealand through their successful defence of the America's Cup in 2000.

Michael Bundock purchased Archangel from Lady Blake in Barcelona in 2004. Bundock then spent about two years sailing her halfway around the world, eventually taking her back to his home in New Zealand. Archangel is currently based in Auckland and is sailed regularly on the Hauraki Gulf. Her sail number is now NZL1040.

== See also ==
- List of sailing boat types
