= Marion–Bermuda Cruising Yacht Race =

- Formation: 1977
- Type: Ocean Sailing Race (Corinthian)
- Affiliations: Beverly Yacht Club, Blue Water Sailing Club, and Royal Hamilton Amateur Dinghy Club
- Website: http://marionbermuda.com

The Marion to Bermuda Cruising Yacht Race is a biennial yacht race held in odd-numbered years, from Marion, Massachusetts to the island of Bermuda, a distance of 645 nautical miles (1,195 km). The most recent race was held starting June 20, 2025.

In 1975 local yacht sailor W. David Kingery from Marion was interested in doing a single-handed race from England to Newport, Rhode Island and sailed alone to Bermuda as a qualifying voyage. This gave Kingery the concept of a race dedicated to cruising sailors and families on this route and he was able to obtain co-operation and sponsorship from the Royal Hamilton Amateur Dinghy Club in Bermuda, the Beverly Yacht Club in Marion and the Blue Water Sailing Club. The first Marion–Bermuda Cruising Yacht Race was organized in 1977 for 104 boats. Unlike other offshore races, the Marion Bermuda race is a non-professional event for non-specialized and relatively inexpensive cruising yachts.

The race defines itself as a "Corinthian" event, that is, one where the owners of the boats are part of the sailing crew and the crew is not paid to take part in the event. The race is run under Offshore Racing Rule handicap rules to allow a wide variety of boats to compete. At first, participants were only allowed to use celestial navigation to find their way to Bermuda. Today, race participants are allowed to use electronic navigation systems such as radio navigation or satellite navigation but there are handicapping bonuses and special prizes for completing the race under celestial navigation.

Due to the blue-water sailing involved, each vessel is required to have a portion of its crew attend a recent Safety at Sea seminar from US Sailing. The organizers of this race and of the Marblehead to Halifax Ocean Race cooperate to sponsor a Safety at Sea Symposium and Practical Training held in the spring before each race.
