= Avonite =

Avonite Surfaces is an acrylic solid surface material brand.
