= Marblehead to Halifax Ocean Race =

Sailing race between Massachusetts and Nova Scotia

- Official logo of the 2011 Marblehead to Halifax Ocean Race
- Sponsor: Steele Auto Group
- First held: 1905
- Organizer: Boston Yacht Club & Royal Nova Scotia Yacht Squadron
- Start: Marblehead, Massachusetts
- Finish: Halifax, Nova Scotia
- Length: 363 nautical miles (672 km)
- Competitors: 75 - 100
- Legs: 1
- Champion: Prospector (2017)
- Website: www.marbleheadtohalifax.com

The Marblehead to Halifax Ocean Race (MHOR) is a biennial sailing race which celebrated its 100th anniversary in 2005. It runs between Marblehead, Massachusetts and Halifax, Nova Scotia. It is believed to be the longest running offshore ocean race in the world and is considered one of the pre-eminent ocean races of the North Atlantic.

== History ==
The first race was held in 1905, starting on 21 August. The Boston Globe ran an article titled “Invitation Ocean Race Marblehead, U.S.A – Halifax, N.S.”

The regatta committee of the Eastern yacht club announces that the club is arranging for an ocean race from Marblehead to Halifax, to be sailed in August.

This is the first international ocean race to be sailed between a port In the United States and one in the provinces, and much good to yachting may be expected from it.

The promotion of such a race is in keeping with a policy adopted by the club last year, to actively encourage sailing on deep water.

A consideration bearing on the selection of Halifax as the termination of the course, was a desire to establish more neighborly relations with our cousins across the gulf of Maine.

The start on the morning of Aug 21 is timed to find most of the large vessels of the New York yacht club, that will have made the cruise of that club, still at Marblehead, where they will have arrived on the afternoon of the 17th, if on time. The annual regatta of the Eastern club will have been sailed on the 19th, Saturday, and on Monday, the 21st, there should be the largest fleet of the year in Marblehead harbor.

Refreshed by a day of rest on Sunday, their crews should be eager to start on such a splendid summer sea turn as from Boston bay to Halifax, with the anticipation of a royal welcome from our provincial cousins at the end of the race.

The owners of the leading schooners, single-masted vessels and yawls in the New York yacht club have been invited to participate in the race.

That first race was won by Elmina II in 45 hours 53 minutes 18 seconds, with Hope Leslie, and Corona third.

The race was run sporadically until 1939, when the Boston Yacht Club joined with the Royal Nova Scotia Yacht Squadron to formalize a biennial event. In the 1939 race, thirteen yachts started and saw light-to-moderate winds and fog conditions that proved challenging for the racers. Twelve yachts completed the race with Tioga Too winning with a nine-hour lead.

Because of World War II, the race was not run from 1939 to 1947, when the MHOR was given international race ranking. Twenty-two yachts were registered with three of them being Canadian.

Since that time, the MHOR has run regularly on alternate years from the Newport Bermuda Race, as one of the pre-eminent ocean races of the North Atlantic.

== The race ==
The race begins in the early afternoon on the first Sunday after July 4th at "Tinkers Gong", just outside Marblehead Harbor. In many years over 400 spectator boats observe the 100 racing yachts at the starting line. The competing boats range in size from better than 30 feet (9.1 m) to over 130 feet (40 m).

The 363 nautical miles (672 km) course runs slightly north of due east leaving Marblehead and sailing past Cape Ann. By the time they reach the open waters of the Gulf of Maine, the fleet has separated for the overnight journey. The tremendous tidal currents in the Gulf of Maine and Bay of Fundy system, as well as the ever-present changing weather conditions create a unique tactical challenge for the racing crews.

Land is sighted near Cape Sable Island after crossing the Gulf of Maine. The fleet then races along the coast of Nova Scotia toward Halifax Harbour.

The finish line is located offshore from the RNSYS marina at the entrance to the Northwest Arm.

The 2019 Marblehead to Halifax Ocean Race will get underway on July 7.

=== Race record ===
The current race record is 28 hours, 28 minutes and 50 seconds; set in 2017 by the 68 foot (21 m) yacht Prospector. They took more than two hours off the 2011 record set by Bella PITA (Bill Tripp design 75 foot (23 m), skippered by Jim Grundy).

MHOR, an ISAF Category 2 event, is a well-known event in North America's sailing community, usually attracting in excess of 100 boats sailing in 5 different divisions. The MHOR is a qualifier for the Northern Ocean Racing Trophy for IRC yachts, the New England Lighthouse Series for Performance Handicap Racing Fleet (PHRF) yachts and the Offshore Racing Rule (ORR) East Coast Championship.

== Awards ==
In 2017 MHOR the following Trophies were awarded:

The Halifax Herald and The Halifax Mail Trophy (1935), awarded to the monohull with the fastest elapsed time over the course.

The Minot-MacAskill Trophy (1905), awarded to the team of 3 yachts chosen by the Commodore of the Boston Yacht Club to represent USA and the Commodore of RNSYS to represent Canada.

=== Division and class prizes (2017) ===
- The Commonwealth of Massachusetts Cup (1935), awarded to the yacht making the best overall corrected time in the IRC Division
- The David P. Prince Memorial Cup (2007), awarded to the yacht making the best overall corrected time in the ORR Division
- The Province of Nova Scotia Tray (1959), awarded to the yacht making the best overall corrected time in the PHRF Racing-Division
- The Guilford Memorial Cup (1935), awarded to the yacht making the best overall corrected time in the PHRF-Cruising-Spinnaker Division
- The Halifax Tourist Bureau Cup (1935), awarded to the yacht making the best overall corrected time in the PHRF-Cruising Division
- The Captain J. Albert Chambers Memorial Trophy (1967), awarded to the yacht making the best corrected time in the Class IRC-1 of the IRC Division
- The H. Mary Powers Memorial Trophy (1985), awarded to the yacht making the best corrected time in the Class IRC-2 of the IRC Division
- The Francis P. Duffy Trophy (1995), awarded to the yacht making the best corrected time in the Class PHR-1 of the PHRF Division
- The National Sea Products Limited Trophy, awarded to the yacht making the best corrected time in the Class PHR-2 of the PHRF Division
- The Wright Cup, awarded to the yacht making the best corrected time in the Class PHR-3 of the PHRF Division
- The L.M.Fowle Trophy, awarded to the yacht making the best corrected time in the Class PHR-4 of the PHRF Division
- The Parker C. Hatch Memorial Trophy, awarded to a competition among clubs having three or more entries in the race
- The Bras d'Or Lakes Trophy (1985), awarded to the Doublehanded entry making the best corrected time in the PHRF Racing Division
- The RNSYS Trustees Bowl (2003), awarded to the Doublehanded entry making the best corrected time in the IRC Division
- The Academy Cup, awarded to Academy Training Vessel making the best corrected time
- The George F. Lawley Memorial Cup (1983), awarded to the schooner, ketch or yawl making the best corrected time
- The Over the Hill Gang Trophy (1999), awarded to the yacht where the average age of the skipper and crew is over 60 ranking best under proportional scoring
- The Cooks Trophy (1979), awarded in the spirit of offshore racing to the Chef aboard the last yacht to finish within the time limit
- The Olin J. Stephens Ocean Racing Award (2007)
- The Chelsea Clock Trophy (2011)
- The Friar Trophy (2011)

In the 2019 MHOR special competitions will include double handed crew in the spinnaker divisions, club teams, teams such as U.S. vs Canada, double handed, all women crew, maritime academies, schooner ketch or yawl and over the hill gang.
