= Cockpit (sailing) =

Part of a boat

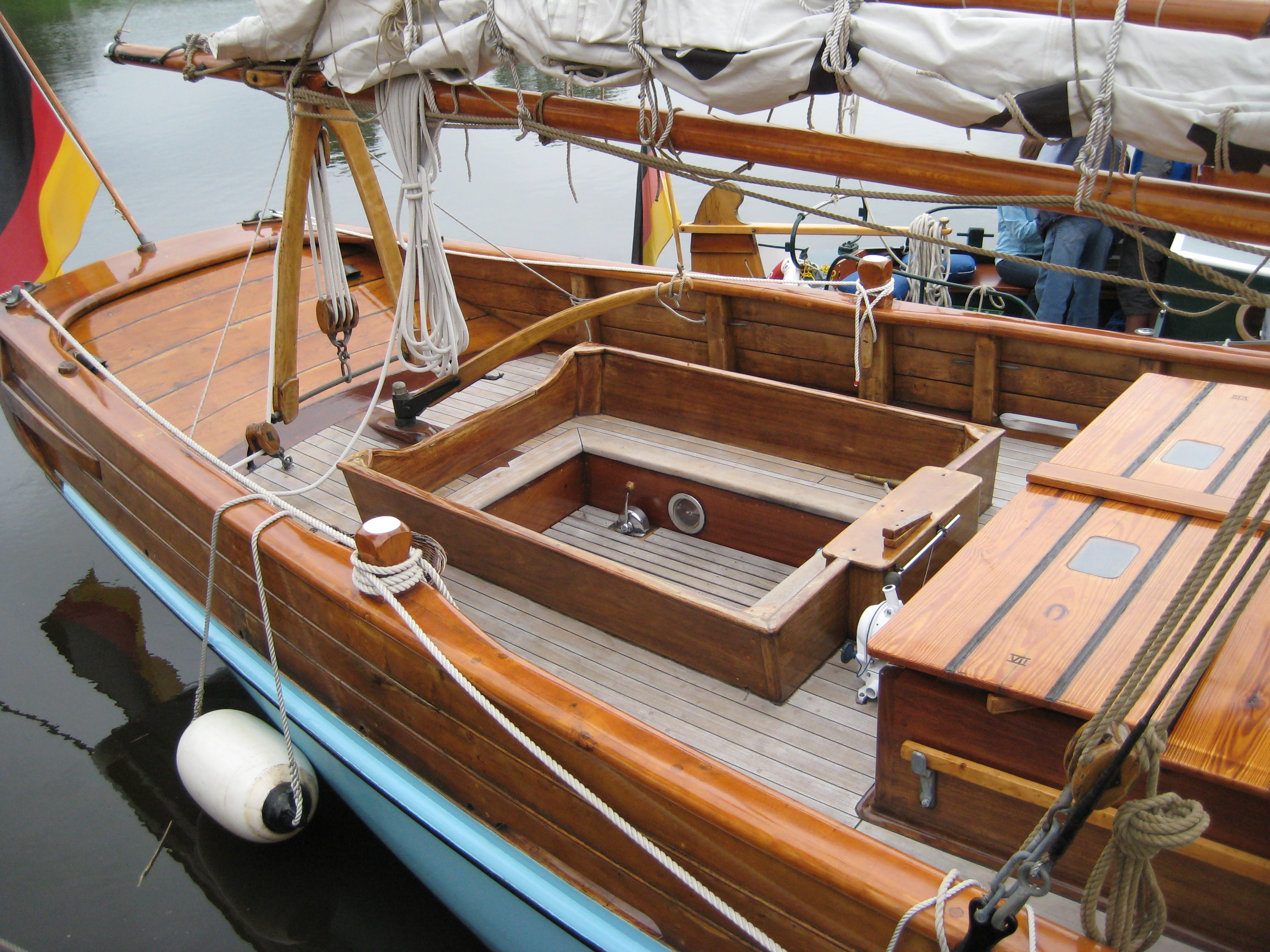
Cockpit of a small sailing boat

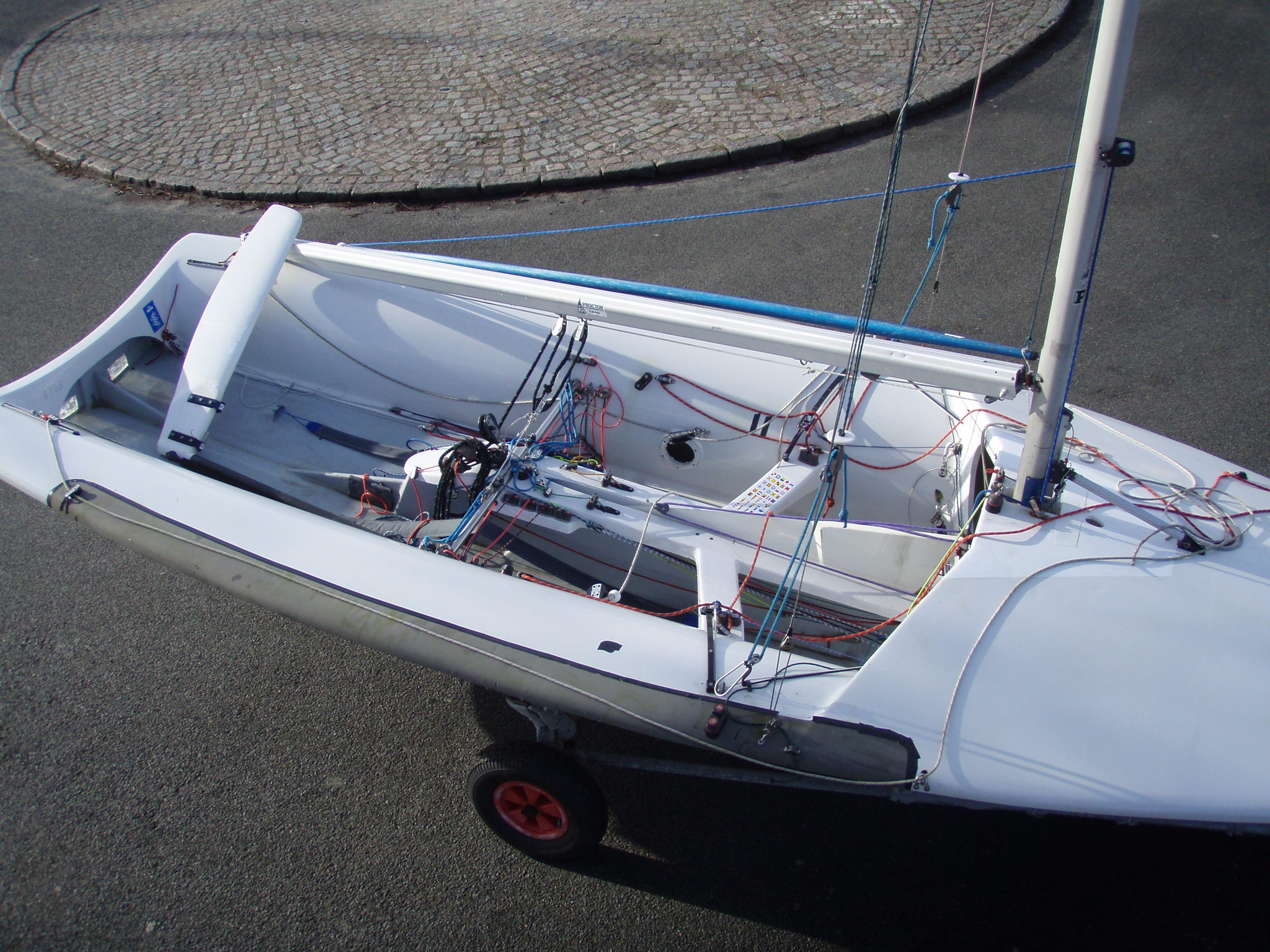
Cockpit in a 505 (dinghy).

A cockpit is the location of controls of a vessel. While traditionally an open well in the deck of a boat outside any deckhouse or cabin, in modern boats it may refer to an enclosed area. Smaller boats typically have an "aft cockpit", towards the stern of the boat, whereas larger vessels may have a "center cockpit" with greater protection from weather. On a recreational sailboat, the cockpit is considered the safest external location for crew.

A bridge deck is a raised separation between an external cockpit and cabin or saloon, used to keep water from astern from entering from the cockpit, especially in following seas.

== History ==
In the Royal Navy, the term "cockpit" originally referred to the area where the coxswain was stationed. This led to the word being used to refer to the area towards the stern of a small decked vessel that houses the rudder controls. The midshipmen and master's mates were later berthed in the cockpit, and it served as the action station for the ship's surgeon and his mates during battle.
