= C&C 43 =

C&C 43 may refer to:

- C&C 43-1, marketed as the C&C 43
- C&C 43-2, also marketed as the C&C 43
