= Alajuela 38 =

Sailboat class

Development
- Designer: William Atkin
- Location: United States
- Year: 1977
- No. built: about 72
- Builder: Alajuela Yacht Corp
- Role: Cruiser

Boat
- Displacement: 27,000 lb (12,247 kg)
- Draft: 6.00 ft (1.83 m)

Hull
- Type: Monohull
- Construction: Fiberglass
- LOA: 38.00 ft (11.58 m)
- LWL: 32.58 ft (9.93 m)
- Beam: 11.50 ft (3.51 m)
- Engine: 40 hp (30 kW) diesel Inboard motor

Hull appendages
- Keel: long keel
- Ballast: 10,000 lb (4,536 kg)
- Rudder: transom-mounted rudder

Rig
- Rig type: Bermuda rig
- I foretriangle height: 47.90 ft (14.60 m)
- J foretriangle base: 19.68 ft (6.00 m)
- P mainsail luff: 41.60 ft (12.68 m)
- E mainsail foot: 17.60 ft (5.36 m)

Sails
- Sailplan: Cutter rigged sloop
- Mainsail area: 366.08 sq ft (34.010 m^{2})
- Jib/genoa area: 471.34 sq ft (43.789 m^{2})
- Total sail area: 837.42 sq ft (77.799 m^{2})

The Alajuela 38 is an American sailboat that was designed by William Atkin as a cruiser and first built in 1977.

The Alajuela 38 is a development of an earlier Atkin design, the Ingrid 38 and the Goucho. Versions of the design were also built by many other builders using an assortment of materials for hull construction, including wood and ferro-cement.

== Production ==
The design was built by the Alajuela Yacht Corp in the United States. The company completed about 72 examples of the design between 1977 and 1985, including some boats delivered as bare hulls and kits for owner-completion. Some boats were completed to this design built from wood or using a ferrocement hull. The number reported as completed varies, depending on whether boats sold as bare hulls or kits are counted. The number is thought to be between 70 and 80.

The boat was the company's first design produced and it took founder Mike Riding almost four years to build the hull molds for the start of production.

== Design ==
The Alajuela 38 is a recreational keelboat, built predominantly of fiberglass, with wood trim. It has a cutter rig, a spooned raked stem with a teak bowsprit, a canoe transom, a transom-hung rudder controlled by a tiller, or an optional wheel and a fixed long keel. It displaces 27,000 lb (12,247 kg) and carries 10,000 lb (4,536 kg) of lead ballast.

The Mark II version has a taller rig of about 7.10 ft (2.16 m), designed by Raymond Richards and has a shorter aluminum bowsprit.

The boat has a draft of 6.00 ft (1.83 m) with the standard keel fitted. The Mark II has a draft of 5.60 ft (1.71 m).

The boat is fitted with an inboard diesel engine of 40 hp (30 kW) for docking and maneuvering. The fuel tank holds 65 U.S. gallons (250 L; 54 imp gal) and the fresh water tank has a capacity of 80 U.S. gallons (300 L; 67 imp gal).

Sleeping accommodations are provided for five people. These include a "V"-berth in the bow cabin, plus two settee berths and a pilot berth in the main cabin. The galley is U-shaped and located on the starboard side at the foot of the companionway steps. It includes a top-loading icebox and a two-burner propane-fueled stove. There is a navigation station aft. A wet locker is mounted between the aft engine room and the galley. The cabin has a teak and holly sole and is finished in teak wood, with a planked ceiling. The head is located just aft of the bow cabin, on the starboard side. The stern lazarette provides vented storage for propane tanks.

Ventilation is provided by four teak ventilators, plus an optional teak skylight.

For sailing, there are three two-speed winches for the halyards and five two-speed winches for the sheets. Tracks are provided for the genoa and the staysail sheets. The mainsheet has a mechanical advantage of 6:1 and employs a mainsheet traveler. The outhaul is an internally mounted design, with a 2:1 advantage. The side decks are 22 in (56 cm) wide and have a non-skid surface of ground walnut shells. The cockpit coamings are of teak. The boat can be equipped with a spinnaker.

The design has a hull speed of 7.65 kn (14.17 km/h).

== Operational history ==
In a 1994 review Richard Sherwood wrote, "this is a passage or cruising boat, not a racer. Long keel gives directional stability, but Alajuela will not turn on a dime. Double-enders offer less area to pooping seas and are intended for cruising. Alajuela has a fast-draining, relatively small cockpit for insurance."

== See also ==
- List of sailing boat types

Related development

- Alajuela 33

Similar sailboats

- C&C 38
- Catalina 38
- Columbia 38
- Eagle 38
- Farr 38
- Hunter 380
- Hunter 386
- Landfall 38
- Sabre 38
- Shannon 38
- Yankee 38
