= Hunter 430 =

Sailboat class

Development
- Designer: Hunter Design Team
- Location: United States
- Year: 1995
- No. built: 415
- Builder: Hunter Marine
- Name: Hunter 430

Boat
- Displacement: 23,800 lb (10,795 kg)
- Draft: 4.92 ft (1.50 m)

Hull
- Type: Monohull
- Construction: Fiberglass
- LOA: 42.5 ft (13.0 m)
- LWL: 38.00 ft (11.58 m)
- Beam: 14.00 ft (4.27 m)
- Engine: Yanmar 4JH2E 50 hp (37 kW) diesel engine

Hull appendages
- Keel: wing keel
- Ballast: 7,600 lb (3,447 kg)
- Rudder: internally-mounted spade-type rudder

Rig
- Rig type: Bermuda rig
- I foretriangle height: 50.00 ft (15.24 m)
- J foretriangle base: 15.79 ft (4.81 m)
- P mainsail luff: 50.00 ft (15.24 m)
- E mainsail foot: 17.75 ft (5.41 m)

Sails
- Sailplan: Fractional B&R rigged sloop
- Mainsail area: 443.75 sq ft (41.226 m^{2})
- Jib/genoa area: 394.75 sq ft (36.673 m^{2})
- Total sail area: 838.50 sq ft (77.899 m^{2})

Racing
- PHRF: 99 (average)

The Hunter 430 is an American sailboat that was designed by the Hunter Design Team as a cruising boat and first built in 1995.

The Hunter 430 is a development of the Hunter 43 Legend, using a similar hull, but different interior arrangement.

== Production ==
The design was built by Hunter Marine in the United States between 1995 and 2000. During its production run 415 examples were completed, but it is now out of production.

== Design ==
The Hunter 430 is a recreational keelboat, built predominantly of fiberglass. It has a fractional sloop B&R rig, a raked stem, a walk-through reverse transom with a swimming platform and a folding ladder, an internally mounted spade-type rudder controlled by a wheel and a fixed wing keel. It displaces 23,800 lb (10,795 kg) and carries 7,600 lb (3,447 kg) of ballast.

The boat has a draft of 4.92 ft (1.50 m) with the standard wing keel fitted.

The boat is fitted with a Japanese Yanmar 4JH2E diesel engine of 50 hp (37 kW). The fuel tank holds 50 U.S. gallons (190 L; 42 imp gal) and the fresh water tank has a capacity of 180 U.S. gallons (680 L; 150 imp gal). There are also two 25 U.S. gallons (95 L; 21 imp gal) waster water holding tanks.

Factory standard equipment included a 110% roller furling genoa, a fiberglass mainsheet arch, three two-speed self tailing winches, marine VHF radio, knotmeter, depth sounder, AM/FM radio and CD player with eight speakers, dual anchor rollers, hot and cold water cockpit shower, two fully enclosed heads with showers, private forward and aft cabins, a dinette table that converts to a berth, microwave oven, refrigerator and separate freezer, dual stainless steel sinks and a three-burner gimbaled propane stove and oven. Factory options included a mainsheet traveler, a double aft cabin, air conditioning, mast furling mainsail, electric anchor winch and a leather interior.

The design has a PHRF racing average handicap of 99 with a high of 111 and low of 96. It has a hull speed of 8.26 kn (15.30 km/h).

== See also ==
- List of sailing boat types

Related development

- Hunter 43 Legend

Similar sailboats

- C&C 43-1
- C&C 43-2
- Hunter 420
- Hunter 426
