= Hunter 420 =

Sailboat class

Development
- Designer: Hunter Design Team
- Location: United States
- Year: 1998
- Builder: Hunter Marine
- Name: Hunter 420

Boat
- Displacement: 19,500 lb (8,845 kg)
- Draft: 6.42 ft (1.96 m)

Hull
- Type: Monohull
- Construction: Fiberglass
- LOA: 43.42 ft (13.23 m)
- LWL: 37.83 ft (11.53 m)
- Beam: 13.83 ft (4.22 m)
- Engine: Yanmar 50 hp (37 kW) diesel engine

Hull appendages
- Keel: fin keel
- Ballast: 6,700 lb (3,039 kg)
- Rudder: internally-mounted spade-type rudder

Rig
- Rig type: Bermuda rig
- I foretriangle height: 47.75 ft (14.55 m)
- J foretriangle base: 16.17 ft (4.93 m)
- P mainsail luff: 45.42 ft (13.84 m)
- E mainsail foot: 19.25 ft (5.87 m)

Sails
- Sailplan: Fractional B&R rigged sloop
- Mainsail area: 437.17 sq ft (40.614 m^{2})
- Jib/genoa area: 386.06 sq ft (35.866 m^{2})
- Total sail area: 823.23 sq ft (76.481 m^{2})

The Hunter 420 is an American sailboat that was designed by the Hunter Design Team as a cruiser and first built in 1998.

== Production ==
The design was built by Hunter Marine in the United States between 1998 and 2004, but it is now out of production.

== Design ==
The Hunter 420 is a recreational keelboat, built predominantly of fiberglass. It has a fractional sloop B&R rig, a center-cockpit, a stainless-steel mainsheet traveler arch, a raked stem, a walk-through reverse transom with a swimming platform and folding ladder, an internally mounted spade-type rudder controlled by a wheel and a fixed fin keel.

The boat has a draft of 6.42 ft (1.96 m) with the standard keel and 5.00 ft (1.52 m) with the optional shoal draft keel.

The boat is fitted with a Japanese Yanmar diesel engine of 50 hp (37 kW). The fuel tank holds 13 U.S. gallons (49 L; 11 imp gal) and the fresh water tank has a capacity of 145 U.S. gallons (550 L; 121 imp gal).

Factory standard equipment included a 110% roller furling genoa, four two-speed self tailing winches, anodized spars, marine VHF radio, knotmeter, depth sounder, AM/FM radio and CD player with six speakers, dual anchor rollers, hot and cold water transom shower, integral solar panel, sealed teak and holly cabin sole, fully enclosed head with shower, private forward and aft cabins, a dinette table that converts to a berth, complete set of kitchen dishes with custom storage, microwave oven, dual sinks, three-burner gimbaled liquid petroleum gas stove, fog bell and oven and six life jackets. Factory options included air conditioning, bimini top, an inner forestay for cutter rigging, spinnaker, electric anchor windlass, a clothes washer and drier, and leather cushions.

The design has a hull speed of 8.24 kn (15.26 km/h).

== Variants ==
Hunter 420 Fin Keel
This model displaces 19,500 lb (8,845 kg) and carries 6,700 lb (3,039 kg) of ballast. The boat has a draft of 6.42 ft (1.96 m) with the standard fin keel.
Hunter 420 Shoal Keel
This model displaces 20,200 lb (9,163 kg) and carries 7,400 lb (3,357 kg) of ballast. The boat has a draft of 5.00 ft (1.52 m) with the optional shoal draft keel.

== See also ==
- List of sailing boat types

Similar sailboats

- C&C 43-1
- C&C 43-2
- Hunter 43 Legend
- Hunter 426
- Hunter 430
