= Catalina 38 =

Sailboat class

Development
- Designer: Sparkman & Stephens
- Location: United States
- Year: 1978
- No. built: 365
- Builder: Catalina Yachts
- Role: Racer-Cruiser
- Name: Catalina 38

Boat
- Displacement: 15,900 lb (7,212 kg)
- Draft: 6.80 ft (2.07 m)

Hull
- Type: Monohull
- Construction: Fiberglass
- LOA: 39.08 ft (11.91 m)
- LWL: 30.25 ft (9.22 m)
- Beam: 11.83 ft (3.61 m)
- Engine: Universal Atomic 4 25 hp (19 kW) gasoline engine

Hull appendages
- Keel: fin keel
- Ballast: 6,850 lb (3,107 kg)
- Rudder: internally-mounted spade-type rudder

Rig
- Rig type: Bermuda rig
- I foretriangle height: 49.80 ft (15.18 m)
- J foretriangle base: 15.50 ft (4.72 m)
- P mainsail luff: 44.00 ft (13.41 m)
- E mainsail foot: 11.50 ft (3.51 m)

Sails
- Sailplan: Masthead sloop
- Mainsail area: 253.00 sq ft (23.504 m^{2})
- Jib/genoa area: 385.95 sq ft (35.856 m^{2})
- Total sail area: 638.95 sq ft (59.360 m^{2})

Racing
- PHRF: 116

The Catalina 38 is an American sailboat that was designed by Sparkman & Stephens as a racer-cruiser and first built in 1978.

The Catalina 38 is a development of the Yankee 38.

== Production ==
The design was built by Catalina Yachts in the United States. The company built 365 examples between 1978 and 1990, but it is now out of production.

== Design ==
The boat was originally designed as Sparkman & Stephens design #2094-C2 for Yankee Yachts and produced as the Yankee 38, but that company only produced 30 examples between 1972 and 1975, before going out of business. Frank V. Butler purchased the molds and modified the design for production by his company, Catalina Yachts. The changes Butler incorporated included a new deck and cabin roof design, a taller rig and a balanced spade rudder, replacing the original skeg-mounted rudder.

The Catalina 38 is a recreational keelboat, built predominantly of fiberglass, with wood trim. It has a masthead sloop rig with aluminum spars, a raked stem, a raised counter reverse transom, an internally mounted spade-type rudder controlled by a wheel and a fixed fin standard draft or shoal draft keel. It displaces 15,900 lb (7,212 kg) and carries 6,850 lb (3,107 kg) of ballast.

The boat has a draft of 6.80 ft (2.07 m) with the standard keel and 4.90 ft (1.49 m) with the optional shoal draft keel.

The boat is fitted with a Universal Atomic 4 25 hp (19 kW) gasoline engine for docking and maneuvering. The fuel tank holds 25 U.S. gallons (95 L; 21 imp gal) and the fresh water tank has a capacity of 55 U.S. gallons (210 L; 46 imp gal).

The design has sleeping accommodation for five or six people. There is a bow cabin with a "V"-berth, two settee berths in the main cabin, including a U-shaped dinette settee and an optional quarter berth aft on the starboard side. The galley is U-shaped and is on the port side, at the foot of the companionway steps. It includes a two-burner stove, an icebox and a double sink, with a pressurized water supply. The navigation station is to starboard, opposite the galley. The head is forward on the port side and features a shower, with a teak grating. The cabin features oiled teak trim.

Ventilation is provided by a main cabin skylight and a bow cabin hatch.

There is an anchor locker in the forepeak. The halyards are hoisted by two winches on the cabin roof. There is a mainsheet traveler also mounted on the cabin roof. The genoa has sheet tracks on the bulwarks and primary winches in the cockpit.

The design has a PHRF Portsmouth Yardstick racing average handicap of 116.

== Operational history ==
In a 1994 review Richard Sherwood wrote, "the Catalina [38] is available with either a standard or a shoal-draft keel. Entry is fine and rig tall, which should assist in going to weather. Maximum beam is amidships."

Michael Robertson, writing for Cruising World, in a 2014 review noted, "with its pedigree, it's no surprise that owners report the Catalina 38 sails to windward like it's on rails and also sails beautifully in light air. That superior upwind performance comes with a draft that approaches 7 feet, a limiting factor for some cruising sailors."

== See also ==
- List of sailing boat types

Related development

- Yankee 38

Similar sailboats

- Alajuela 38
- C&C 38
- Columbia 38
- Eagle 38
- Hunter 380
- Hunter 386
- Landfall 38
- Sabre 38
- Shannon 38
