= Hunter 37 =

Sailboat class

Development
- Designer: John Cherubini
- Location: United States
- Year: 1978
- No. built: more than 400
- Builder: Hunter Marine
- Name: Hunter 37

Boat
- Displacement: 17,800 lb (8,074 kg)
- Draft: 5.08 ft (1.55 m)

Hull
- Type: Monohull
- Construction: Fiberglass
- LOA: 37.00 ft (11.28 m)
- LWL: 30.00 ft (9.14 m)
- Beam: 11.85 ft (3.61 m)
- Engine: Yanmar 2QM20H diesel engine

Hull appendages
- Keel: fin keel
- Ballast: 6,850 lb (3,107 kg)
- Rudder: internally-mounted spade-type rudder

Rig
- Rig type: Cutter rig
- I foretriangle height: 46.16 ft (14.07 m)
- J foretriangle base: 17.00 ft (5.18 m)
- P mainsail luff: 39.50 ft (12.04 m)
- E mainsail foot: 13.00 ft (3.96 m)

Sails
- Sailplan: Cutter rigged sloop
- Mainsail area: 256.75 sq ft (23.853 m^{2})
- Jib/genoa area: 392.36 sq ft (36.451 m^{2})
- Total sail area: 649.11 sq ft (60.304 m^{2})

Racing
- PHRF: 123 (average)

The Hunter 37 is an American sailboat that was designed by John Cherubini for bluewater cruising and first built in 1978.

The Hunter 37 is sometimes confused with the unrelated 1986 Hunter 37 Legend design.

== Production ==
The design was built by Hunter Marine in the United States between 1978 and 1984, but it is now out of production.

The boat was most likely designed in 1977, with hull #1 constructed in June or July 1978. There were about seven boats constructed in the 1978 model year, which ended at the end of July, with the 1979 model years starting in August 1978.

The 1980 model saw the original Yanmar 2QM20 replaced with a more powerful 30 hp (22 kW) 3QM30. In mid-1982 the deck mold for the boat was retooled. Changes included the mainsheet traveller moved from the bridge deck to the cabin roof ahead of the companionway. The cockpit combings were redesigned, made longer and connected to the splash guard at the base of the dodger. The changes necessitated rearrangement of the ports, moving the aft one a foot (30 cm) forward and reducing one of the three large ports from 7"X14" to 5"X12". A small 5"X12" port was added to the starboard side of the rear cabin bulkhead to provide light in the galley, along with other minor design changes.

The 1984 model year in August 1983 brought further changes, including replacing the large opening ports with two long trapezoidal fixed ports, while retaining the three small 5"x12" opening ports on each side of the cabin. The engine was changed to the four-cylinder Yanmar 4JHE.

Production ended in 1984, with the last three or so boats being 1985 models. Total production was just over 400 examples

== Design ==
The Hunter 37 is a recreational keelboat, built predominantly of fiberglass, with wood trim. It is a cutter rigged sloop with a raked stem, a raised reverse transom, an internally-mounted spade-type rudder controlled by a wheel and a fixed fin keel. It displaces 17,800 lb (8,074 kg) and carries 6,850 lb (3,107 kg) of ballast.

The boat has a draft of 5.08 ft (1.55 m) with the standard keel and 4.00 ft (1.22 m) with the optional shoal draft keel.

The boat was initially fitted with a Japanese Yanmar 2QM20H diesel engine. The fuel tank holds 60 U.S. gallons (230 L; 50 imp gal) and the fresh water tank has a capacity of 100 U.S. gallons (380 L; 83 imp gal).

The design features two private cabins, one forward and one aft, a head with a shower, a drop-leaf dinette table, a galley with a two-burner gimbal-mounted stove and an icebox that can be accesses from the cockpit while under way. The one-piece mast is keel-stepped and headsail is roller furling, while the staysail is boom-mounted. Dual two-speed, self-tailing winches are provided as standard equipment.

The full keel version has a PHRF racing average handicap of 123 with a high of 141 and low of 105. The shoal draft keel version has a PHRF racing average handicap of 141 with a high of 162 and low of 117. It has a hull speed of 7.34 kn (13.59 km/h).

== See also ==
- List of sailing boat types

Similar sailboats

- Hunter 37 Legend
- Hunter 37.5 Legend
- Hunter 376
