= Hunter 386 =

Sailboat class

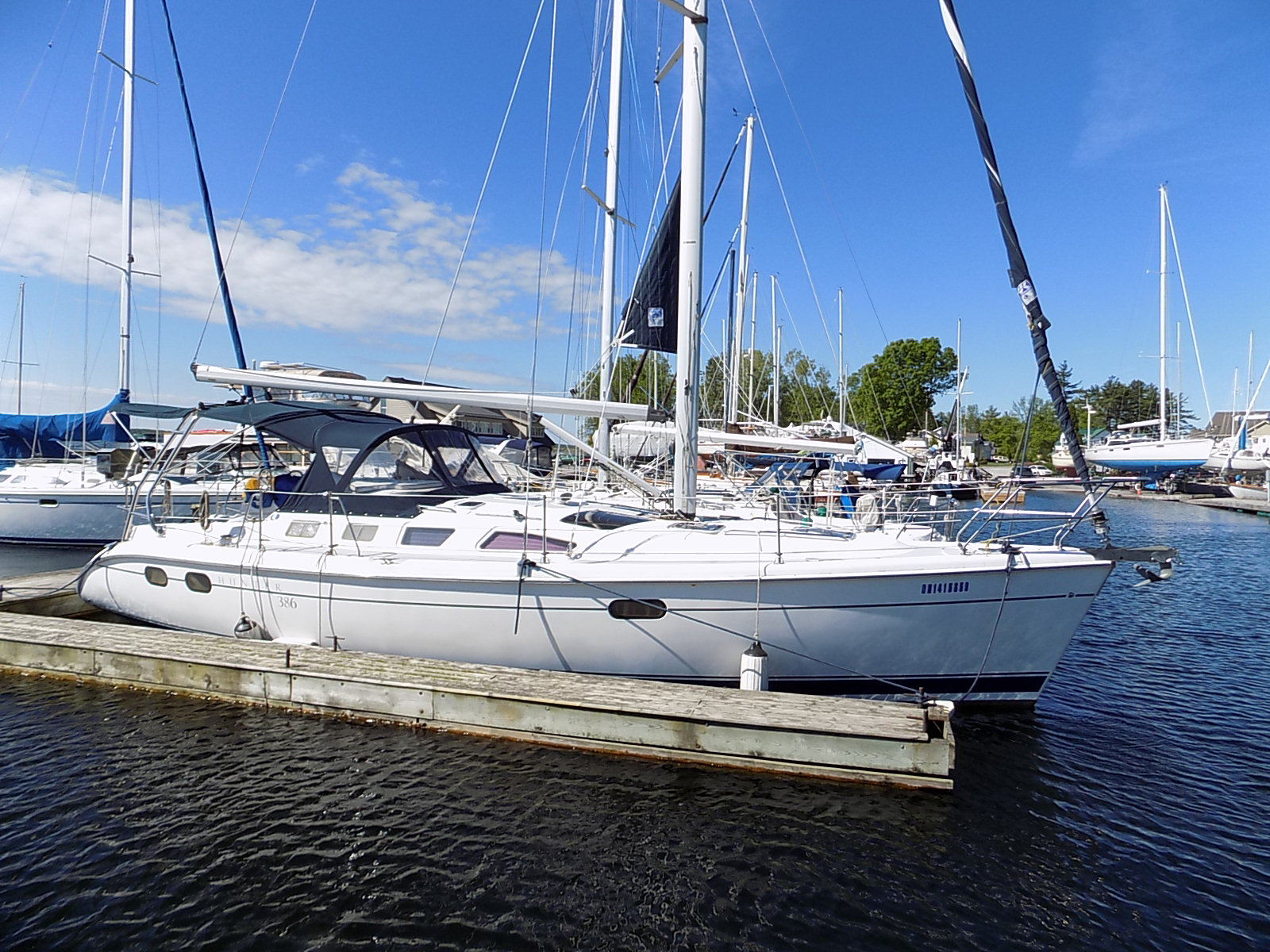

Development
- Designer: Hunter Design Team
- Location: United States
- Year: 1999
- Builder: Hunter Marine
- Name: Hunter 386

Boat
- Displacement: 16,000 lb (7,257 kg)
- Draft: 5.00 ft (1.52 m)

Hull
- Type: Monohull
- Construction: Fiberglass
- LOA: 38.25 ft (11.66 m)
- LWL: 32.00 ft (9.75 m)
- Beam: 12.58 ft (3.83 m)
- Engine: Yanmar 40 hp (30 kW) diesel engine

Hull appendages
- Keel: fin keel
- Ballast: 5,900 lb (2,676 kg)
- Rudder: internally-mounted spade-type rudder

Rig
- General: B&R rigged sloop
- I foretriangle height: 48.00 ft (14.63 m)
- J foretriangle base: 12.92 ft (3.94 m)
- P mainsail luff: 46.67 ft (14.23 m)
- E mainsail foot: 18.42 ft (5.61 m)

Sails
- Mainsail area: 429.83 sq ft (39.933 m^{2})
- Jib/genoa area: 310.08 sq ft (28.807 m^{2})
- Total sail area: 739.91 sq ft (68.740 m^{2})

The Hunter 386 is an American sailboat, that was designed by the Hunter Design Team and first built in 1999.

The Hunter 386 shares a common hull with the Hunter 376 and the Hunter 380.

== Production ==
The boat was built by Hunter Marine in the United States, starting in 1999, but it is now out of production.

== Design ==
The Hunter 386 is a small recreational keelboat, built predominantly of fiberglass, with no external wood trim. It has a B&R rig sloop configuration, a roller furling jib, internally mast-furling mainsail, an internally-mounted spade-type rudder and a fixed fin keel.

The boat has a draft of 5.00 ft (1.52 m) with the standard fin keel and 6.50 ft (1.98 m) with the optional deep fin keel. It displaces 16,000 lb (7,257 kg) and carries 5,900 lb (2,676 kg) of ballast with the standard keel and displaces 15,595 lb (7,074 kg) and carries 5,495 lb (2,492 kg) of ballast with the standard keel.

The boat is fitted with a Japanese Yanmar diesel engine of 40 hp (30 kW). The fuel tank holds 30 U.S. gallons (110 L; 25 imp gal) and the fresh water tank has a capacity of 75 U.S. gallons (280 L; 62 imp gal).

The design has a hull speed of 7.58 kn (14.04 km/h).

== See also ==
- List of sailing boat types

Related development

- Hunter 38
- Hunter 376
- Hunter 380

Similar sailboats

- Alajuela 38
- C&C 38
- Catalina 38
- Catalina 375
- Eagle 38
- Farr 38
- Landfall 38
- Sabre 38
- Shannon 38
- Yankee 38
