= Sabre 38 =

Sailboat class

Development
- Designer: Roger Hewson and the Sabre Design Team
- Location: United States
- Year: 1981
- No. built: 100 (Mark I), 114 (Mark II)
- Builder: Sabre Yachts
- Role: Racer-Cruiser
- Name: Sabre 38

Boat
- Displacement: 15,200 lb (6,895 kg)
- Draft: 6.50 ft (1.98 m)

Hull
- Type: Monohull
- Construction: Fiberglass
- LOA: 37.83 ft (11.53 m)
- LWL: 31.17 ft (9.50 m)
- Beam: 11.50 ft (3.51 m)
- Engine: Westerbeke 33 hp (25 kW) diesel engine

Hull appendages
- Keel: fin keel
- Ballast: 6,400 lb (2,903 kg)
- Rudder: skeg-mounted rudder

Rig
- Rig type: Bermuda rig
- I foretriangle height: 49.50 ft (15.09 m)
- J foretriangle base: 15.80 ft (4.82 m)
- P mainsail luff: 43.40 ft (13.23 m)
- E mainsail foot: 13.80 ft (4.21 m)

Sails
- Sailplan: Masthead sloop
- Mainsail area: 299.46 sq ft (27.821 m^{2})
- Jib/genoa area: 391.05 sq ft (36.330 m^{2})
- Total sail area: 690.51 sq ft (64.150 m^{2})

Racing
- PHRF: 111

The Sabre 38 is an American sailboat that was designed by Roger Hewson and the Sabre Design Team as a racer-cruiser and first built in 1981.

== Production ==
The design was built by Sabre Yachts in the United States, but it is now out of production. A total of 100 of the original design were completed between 1981 and 1987, while 114 of the Mark II version were built from 1988 to 1995.

== Design ==
The Sabre 38 is a recreational keelboat, built predominantly of fiberglass, with wood trim. It has a masthead sloop rig, a raked stem, a reverse transom and a skeg-mounted rudder controlled by a wheel.

The boat is fitted with a Westerbeke diesel engine of 33 hp (25 kW). The fuel tank holds 45 U.S. gallons (170 L; 37 imp gal) and the fresh water tank has a capacity of 106 U.S. gallons (400 L; 88 imp gal).

The Mark I has sleeping accommodation for six people, with a forward "V"-berth in the bow cabin, a double port side settee berth in the main cabin, along with a single settee berth on the starboard side and double and single aft quarter berths. The navigation station is on the starboard side. The galley is at the foot of the companionway steps on the port side and includes a three-burner alcohol-fired stove and oven, an ice box or refrigerator under the cockpit and a pressurized water supply. The head is located just aft of the bow cabin, on the port side and includes a shower.

Ventilation is provided by hatches over the main and bow cabins, plus eight opening ports.

The cockpit is T-shaped and has self-tailing winches for the genoa jib. There are winches for the halyards and for reefing. The mainsail has a mainsheet traveler on the cabin top. The boat may be optionally equipped with a boom vang and a spinnaker, including associated hardware and winches.

== Variants ==
Sabre 38
Designed by Roger Hewson and the Sabre Design Team and introduced in 1981, with 100 built before production ended in 1987. It has a length overall of 37.83 ft (11.5 m) and a waterline length of 31.17 ft (9.5 m). The fin keel version displaces 15,200 lb (6,895 kg), carries 6,400 lb (2,903 kg) of ballast and has a draft of 6.50 ft (1.98 m). The centerboard-equipped version displaces 15,600 lb (7,076 kg), carries 6,800 lb (3,084 kg) of ballast. It has a draft of 6.75 ft (2.06 m) with the centreboard extended and 4.25 ft (1.30 m) with it retracted. The boat has a manufacturer-determined PHRF racing average handicap of 111.
Sabre 38 Mark II
Designed by Roger Hewson and introduced in 1988, with 114 completed before production ended in 1995. It has a length overall of 38.67 ft (11.8 m), a waterline length of 31.42 ft (9.6 m), displaces 16,900 lb (7,666 kg) and carries 6,600 lb (2,994 kg) of ballast. The boat has a draft of 6.50 ft (1.98 m) with the standard keel fitted. A shoal draft wing keel and a stub keel with a centerboard were factory options.

== Operational history ==
In a 1994 review Richard Sherwood wrote of the Mark I, "the hull and rig are designed for speed, while the cabin arrangement is comfortable for cruising. Fuel and water are adequate for offshore sailing. The keel model is standard, the keel/centerboard is optional."

== See also ==
Similar sailboats

- Alajuela 38
- C&C 38
- Catalina 38
- Columbia 38
- Eagle 38
- Farr 38
- Hunter 380
- Hunter 386
- Landfall 38
- Shannon 38
- Yankee 38

Related

- Sabre 28
