= Hunter 380 =

Sailboat class

Development
- Designer: Hunter Design Team
- Location: United States
- Year: 1996
- Builder: Hunter Marine
- Name: Hunter 380

Boat
- Displacement: 16,000 lb (7,257 kg)
- Draft: 5.00 ft (1.52 m)

Hull
- Type: Monohull
- Construction: Fiberglass
- LOA: 37.25 ft (11.35 m)
- LWL: 32.00 ft (9.75 m)
- Beam: 12.58 ft (3.83 m)
- Engine: Yanmar 3JH2E 36 hp (27 kW) diesel engine

Hull appendages
- Keel: wing keel
- Ballast: 5,900 lb (2,676 kg)
- Rudder: internally-mounted spade-type rudder

Rig
- Rig type: Bermuda rig
- I foretriangle height: 48.00 ft (14.63 m)
- J foretriangle base: 12.92 ft (3.94 m)
- P mainsail luff: 46.67 ft (14.23 m)
- E mainsail foot: 18.42 ft (5.61 m)

Sails
- Sailplan: Fractional B&R rigged sloop
- Mainsail area: 429.83 sq ft (39.933 m^{2})
- Jib/genoa area: 310.08 sq ft (28.807 m^{2})
- Total sail area: 739.91 sq ft (68.740 m^{2})

Racing
- PHRF: 105 (average)

The Hunter 380 is an American sailboat that was designed by the Hunter Design Team as a cruiser and first built in 1999.

The Hunter 380 shares a common hull with the Hunter 386 and the Hunter 376.

== Production ==
The design was built by Hunter Marine in the United States between 1999 and 2001, but it is now out of production.

== Design ==
The Hunter 380 is a recreational keelboat, built predominantly of fiberglass. It has a fractional sloop B&R rig, a fiberglass mainsheet traveler arch, a raked stem, a walk-through reverse transom, an internally mounted spade-type rudder controlled by a wheel and a fixed wing keel or fin keel. It displaces 16,000 lb (7,257 kg) and carries 5,900 lb (2,676 kg) of ballast.

The boat has a draft of 5.00 ft (1.52 m) with the standard wing keel and 6.50 ft (1.98 m) with the optional deep draft fin keel.

The boat is fitted with a Japanese Yanmar 3JH2E diesel engine of 36 hp (27 kW). The fuel tank holds 30 U.S. gallons (110 L; 25 imp gal) and the fresh water tank has a capacity of 75 U.S. gallons (280 L; 62 imp gal). The cabin headroom is 78 in (198 cm).

The design has a PHRF racing average handicap of 105 with a high of 114 and low of 96. It has a hull speed of 7.58 kn (14.04 km/h).

== See also ==
- List of sailing boat types

Related development

- Hunter 38
- Hunter 376
- Hunter 386

Similar sailboats

- Alajuela 38
- C&C 38
- Catalina 38
- Catalina 375
- Columbia 38
- Eagle 38
- Farr 38
- Landfall 38
- Sabre 38
- Shannon 38
- Yankee 38
