= Shannon 38 =

Sailboat class

Development
- Designer: Walter Shultz and G, H. Stadel & Son
- Location: United States
- Year: 1975
- No. built: 100
- Builder: Shannon Yachts
- Role: Cruiser
- Name: Shannon 38

Boat
- Displacement: 18,500 lb (8,391 kg)
- Draft: 5.00 ft (1.52 m)

Hull
- Type: Monohull
- Construction: Fiberglass
- LOA: 37.75 ft (11.51 m)
- LWL: 29.16 ft (8.89 m)
- Beam: 11.50 ft (3.51 m)
- Engine: Perkins Engines 40 hp (30 kW) diesel engine

Hull appendages
- Keel: long keel
- Rudder: keel-mounted rudder

Rig
- Rig type: Cutter rig
- I foretriangle height: 45.00 ft (13.72 m)
- J foretriangle base: 17.50 ft (5.33 m)
- P mainsail luff: 40.00 ft (12.19 m)
- E mainsail foot: 16.70 ft (5.09 m)

Sails
- Sailplan: Cutter rigged sloop or ketch
- Mainsail area: 334.00 sq ft (31.030 m^{2})
- Jib/genoa area: 393.75 sq ft (36.581 m^{2})
- Total sail area: 727.75 sq ft (67.610 m^{2})

Racing
- PHRF: 181.5

The Shannon 38 is an American sailboat that was designed by Walter Shultz, plus George Stadel III and George H. Stadel Jr. of G, H. Stadel & Son as a cruiser and first built in 1975.

The Shannon 38 can be confused with the Shannon 38 HPS an unrelated, 2013 motorsailer design.

== Production ==
The boat was built by Shannon Yachts in the United States and was the company's first design. The boat was produced from 1975 to 1988, with 100 examples completed, but it is now out of production.

== Design ==
The Shannon 38 is a recreational keelboat, built predominantly of fiberglass, with teak wooden trim. It has a cutter rig or optional ketch rig with aluminum spars, a raked stem, a raised counter transom, a keel-mounted rudder controlled by a wheel and a fixed long keel or stub keel and centerboard. The design includes a teak bowsprit and cockpit coamings. It displaces 18,500 lb (8,391 kg) and employs lead ballast. A small number were constructed with a pilothouse.

The keel-equipped version of the boat has a draft of 5.00 ft (1.52 m), while the centerboard-equipped version has a draft of 7.50 ft (2.29 m) with the centerboard extended and 4.25 ft (1.30 m) with it retracted, allowing operation in shallow water.

The boat is fitted with a British Perkins Engines diesel engine of 40 hp (30 kW) for docking and maneuvering. The fuel tank holds 70 U.S. gallons (260 L; 58 imp gal) and the fresh water tank has a capacity of 120 U.S. gallons (450 L; 100 imp gal).

The interior design was semi-custom, but a typical layout could include sleeping accommodation for six people. An aft port quarter berth also serves as the navigation station seat. The drop-leaf dinette table folds and has two settee berths, plus a raised pilot berth on the port side. The bow cabin berth is a double on the starboard side, and has a work bench and sail locker opposite. The galley is located at the foot of the companionway steps on the starboard side and includes a three-burner propane stove and a 9 cu ft (0.25 m^{3}) icebox. The head is aft of the bow cabin and on the starboard side. Interior trim is of teak.

Ventilation is provided by four dorade vents, 12 bronze ports and two deck hatches, one over the bow cabin and one over the main cabin.

There is an aft vapor-proof propane locker, with external, overboard venting.

For sailing there are eight winches fitted for the halyards, staysail, mainsheet, genoa and reefing. There also are mainsail and staysail travelers provided.

The design has a PHRF racing average handicap of 181.5.

== Operational history ==
In a 1994 review Richard Sherwood wrote, "this Shannon has been designed for long-range offshore cruising. The keel is long and full. Basic options include either a cutter or a ketch rig and either a standard or a pilothouse design. Cabin layout is semi-custom and will depend upon the choices above."

== See also ==
- List of sailing boat types

Similar sailboats

- Alajuela 38
- C&C 38
- Catalina 38
- Columbia 38
- Eagle 38
- Farr 38
- Hunter 380
- Hunter 386
- Landfall 38
- Sabre 38
- Yankee 38
