= Farr 38 =

Sailboat class

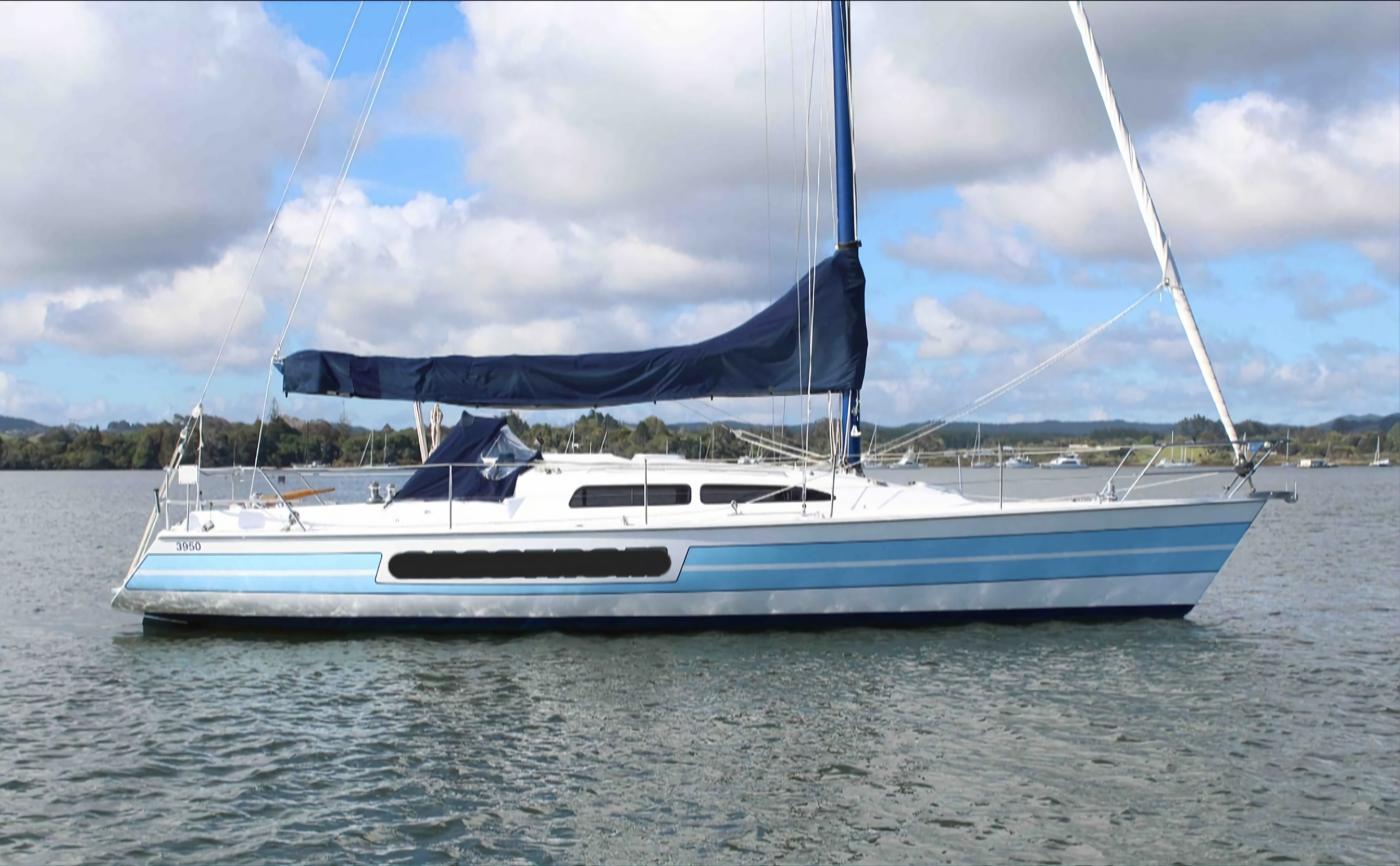
- New Zealand-built Farr 38

Development
- Designer: Bruce Farr
- Location: New Zealand
- Year: 1978
- No. built: 85
- Builders: Spindrift Yacht Inc; Marina Bracuhy
- Role: Racer-Cruiser
- Name: Farr 38

Boat
- Displacement: 10,600 lb (4,808 kg)
- Draft: 6.50 ft (1.98 m)

Hull
- Type: Monohull
- Construction: Cold-moulded wood and fibreglass
- LOA: 38.25 ft (11.66 m)
- LWL: 31.17 ft (9.50 m)
- Beam: 12.00 ft (3.66 m)
- Engine: Pathfinder 40 hp (30 kW) diesel engine

Hull appendages
- Keel: fin keel
- Ballast: 4,100 lb (1,860 kg)
- Rudder: internally-mounted spade-type rudder

Rig
- Rig type: Bermuda rig
- I foretriangle height: 43.00 ft (13.11 m)
- J foretriangle base: 13.33 ft (4.06 m)
- P mainsail luff: 44.92 ft (13.69 m)
- E mainsail foot: 19.92 ft (6.07 m)

Sails
- Sailplan: Fractional rigged sloop
- Mainsail area: 402.48 sq ft (37.392 m^{2})
- Jib/genoa area: 286.60 sq ft (26.626 m^{2})
- Total sail area: 689.08 sq ft (64.018 m^{2})

Racing
- PHRF: 83

The Farr 38, also called the Farr 11.6m, is a sailboat that was designed by New Zealander Bruce Farr as a racer-cruiser and first built in 1978. It is Farr Yacht Design number 72.

The Farr 38 is sometimes confused with an earlier Farr 38 design. This unrelated design was produced as a single boat, the Jenny H, constructed in 1977.

== Production ==
The design was built on a production basis in Australia, Brazil, Canada, New Zealand and South Africa. It was built by Compass Yachts in New Zealand, Spindrift Yacht Inc in Canada and by Marina Bracuhy in Brazil. A number of boats were built by amateur boatbuilders from purchased plans as well. Collectively they completed 85 examples, with production commencing in 1978, but it is now out of production.

== Design ==
The Farr 38 is a recreational keelboat, built predominantly of cold-moulded wood, finished with epoxy and polyurethane and fibreglass, with the New Zealand production-built boats built out of Fibreglass. It has a fractional sloop rig with polyurethane-painted aluminum spars, a raked stem, a reverse transom, an internally mounted spade-type rudder controlled by a tiller or optional wheel and a fixed fin keel. It displaces 10,600 lb (4,808 kg) and carries 4,100 lb (1,860 kg) of ballast.

The boat has a draft of 6.50 ft (1.98 m) with the standard keel fitted.

The boat is fitted with a Pathfinder diesel engine of 40 hp (30 kW) for docking and manoeuvring. The fuel tank holds 20 U.S. gallons (76 L; 17 imp gal) and the fresh water tank has a capacity of 105 U.S. gallons (400 L; 87 imp gal).

The design has sleeping accommodation for eight people. There is a bow cabin, with a "V"-berth, two settee berths in the main cabin and two quarter berths aft, one of which is a double berth. The galley is located on the starboard side at the foot of the companionway steps and features a two-burner liquefied petroleum gas stove and an oven. Pressurized water and a refrigerator were factory options. The navigation station is to port, opposite the galley. The head is located just aft of the bow cabin, on the port side and includes a shower.

Sail controls include four halyard winches, two secondary and two primary jib winches and a one general purpose winch. The halyards and outhaul are mounted internally, as is the jiffy reefing system. There is a 4:1 mechanical advantage boom vang, as well as an adjustable backstay. The mainsheet traveller is mounted on the bridge deck and genoa tracks and lead blocks are provided. The boat can be fitted with a spinnaker for downwind sailing.

Anodized spars and a wooden deck made from cedar were also factory options.

The design has a PHRF racing average handicap of 83.

== Operational history ==
In a 1994 review Richard Sherwood wrote, "cold-molded wood, unusual in a boat of this size, is used for construction. The hull framing is cedar and the skins, spruce. Planking is thin strips adhesive-bonded in diagonal and longitudinal laminations. The result is a high-performance cruiser that has been successfully raced."

== See also ==
- List of sailing boat types

Similar sailboats

- Alajuela 38
- C&C 38
- Columbia 38
- Eagle 38
- Hunter 380
- Hunter 386
- Landfall 38
- Sabre 38
- Shannon 38
- Yankee 38
