= Hunter 38 =

Sailboat class

Development
- Designer: Glenn Henderson
- Location: United States
- Year: 2004
- Builder: Hunter Marine
- Name: Hunter 38

Boat
- Displacement: 18,342 lb (8,320 kg)
- Draft: 6.50 ft (1.98 m)

Hull
- Type: Monohull
- Construction: Fiberglass
- LOA: 38.16 ft (11.63 m)
- LWL: 34.68 ft (10.57 m)
- Beam: 12.93 ft (3.94 m)
- Engine: Yanmar 29 hp (22 kW) diesel engine

Hull appendages
- Keel: fin keel
- Ballast: 6,130 lb (2,781 kg)
- Rudder: internally-mounted spade-type rudder

Rig
- Rig type: Bermuda rig
- I foretriangle height: 46.65 ft (14.22 m)
- J foretriangle base: 12.07 ft (3.68 m)
- P mainsail luff: 47.41 ft (14.45 m)
- E mainsail foot: 17.75 ft (5.41 m)

Sails
- Sailplan: Fractional B&R rigged sloop
- Mainsail area: 281.53 sq ft (26.155 m^{2})
- Jib/genoa area: 420.76 sq ft (39.090 m^{2})
- Total sail area: 702.30 sq ft (65.246 m^{2})

The Hunter 38 is an American sailboat that was designed by Glenn Henderson as a cruiser and first built in 2004.

The Hunter 38 design post-dates the 1999 Hunter 380, which is a designation sequence anomaly.

The Hunter 38 was replaced in production by the Hunter 39.

== Production ==
The design was built by Hunter Marine in the United States starting in 2004, but it is now out of production.

== Design ==
The Hunter 38 is a recreational keelboat, built predominantly of fiberglass. It has a fractional sloop B&R rig, a nearly plumb stem, a walk-through reverse transom with a swimming platform and folding ladder, an internally mounted spade-type rudder controlled by a folding wheel and a fixed fin keel or optional wing keel.

The boat is fitted with a Japanese Yanmar diesel engine of 29 hp (22 kW), with a 40 hp (30 kW) motor optional. The fuel tank holds 35 U.S. gallons (130 L; 29 imp gal) and the fresh water tank has a capacity of 75 U.S. gallons (280 L; 62 imp gal). The cabin headroom is 78 in (198 cm).

Factory standard equipment included a 110% roller furling genoa, mainsheet traveler mounted on a stainless-steel arch, four two-speed self tailing winches, marine VHF radio, knotmeter, depth sounder, AM/FM radio and CD player, anchor and roller, dorade vents, hot and cold water cockpit shower, indirect cabin lighting, laminate cabin sole, fully enclosed head with shower, private forward and aft cabins, a dinette table that converts to a berth, six complete sets of kitchen dishes, microwave oven, dual sinks, two-burner gimbaled liquid petroleum gas stove and oven and six life jackets. Factory options included a shoal draft wing keel, a double aft cabin, air conditioning, Bimini top, dodger, spinnaker, mast furling and associated equipment, electric anchor winch, 15 in (38 cm) flat screen TV and leather cushions.

== Operational history ==
A 2005 review by Dieter Liobner was done when the design was named Cruising World's Production Cruiser under 40 Feet that year. "Hands down, the boat convinced the judges that it was the unanimous choice to win the class of production cruisers under 40 feet. It did it with better-than-expected performance, good design ideas, and follow-through in their execution. And tellingly, value didn't enter the discussion until the final stages. With a suggested sailaway price of $160,000, "it's a hell of a lot of boat for the buck," said Bill Lee. "Hunter is getting better design, better construction, and has price control," Alvah Simon said in summary. "I enjoyed sailing the boat, and I think other people are going to as well." Liobner praised the interior and the sailing qualities.

A review in May 2006 Practical Sailor examined each feature of the boat on great detail. The roller furling main and jib, along with the mainsheet arch were panned. The arch was faulted for detracting from appearance, adding weight up high and increasing windage. Of the optional mast furling mainsail the reviewer wrote, "The boat was fitted with an in-mast furling mainsail, and the company's own literature indicates that this reduces sail area by 148 sq. ft. We feel that’s a tremendous price to pay for convenience, especially in light-air venues and considering that sails are typically set once a day. On a 38' boat displacing 17,000 pounds, we'd opt for an electric halyard winch and a flaking system before sacrificing that much Dacron." The review also praised the mainsail control routing, halrad tail stowage, cockpit space, folding wheel and the synthetic laminates. The reviewer faulted the cockpit stowage and called the transom seating "aesthetically awkward".

== Variants ==
Hunter 38 Deep Keel
This model displaces 18,342 lb (8,320 kg) and carries 6,133 lb (2,782 kg) of ballast. The boat has a draft of 6.5 ft (2.0 m) with the standard deep fin keel.
Hunter 38 Wing Keel
This model displaces 18,326 lb (8,313 kg) and carries 6,552 lb (2,972 kg) of ballast. The boat has a draft of 5.00 ft (1.52 m) with the optional wing keel.

== See also ==
- List of sailing boat types

Related development

- Hunter 380
- Hunter 386

Similar sailboats

- C&C 38
- Catalina 375
- Eagle 38
- Landfall 38
