= Yankee 38 =

Sailboat class

Development
- Designer: Sparkman & Stephens
- Location: United States
- Year: 1972
- No. built: 30
- Builder: Yankee Yachts
- Role: Racer-Cruiser
- Name: Yankee 38

Boat
- Displacement: 16,000 lb (7,257 kg)
- Draft: 6.25 ft (1.91 m)

Hull
- Type: Monohull
- Construction: Fiberglass
- LOA: 38.17 ft (11.63 m)
- LWL: 28.75 ft (8.76 m)
- Beam: 11.75 ft (3.58 m)
- Engine: Westerbeke 491 30 hp (22 kW) diesel engine

Hull appendages
- Keel: fin keel
- Ballast: 7,327 lb (3,323 kg)
- Rudder: skeg-mounted rudder

Rig
- Rig type: Bermuda rig
- I foretriangle height: 48.50 ft (14.78 m)
- J foretriangle base: 15.70 ft (4.79 m)
- P mainsail luff: 42.80 ft (13.05 m)
- E mainsail foot: 12.00 ft (3.66 m)

Sails
- Sailplan: Masthead sloop
- Mainsail area: 256.80 sq ft (23.858 m^{2})
- Jib/genoa area: 380.73 sq ft (35.371 m^{2})
- Total sail area: 637.53 sq ft (59.228 m^{2})

The Yankee 38 is an American sailboat that was designed by Sparkman & Stephens as racer-cruiser and first built in 1972.

The design was a development of the 1971 IOR One Ton Cup racing boat Lightnin.

The Yankee 38 design was developed into the Catalina 38 in 1978, after Yankee Yachts went out of business and the molds were sold to Frank V. Butler.

== Production ==
The boat was Sparkman & Stephens design #2094-C2 and was built by Yankee Yachts in the United States. The company completed 30 examples of the type between 1972 and 1975, but it is now out of production.

== Design ==
The Yankee 38 is a recreational keelboat, built predominantly of fiberglass, with wood trim. It has a masthead sloop rig, a raked stem, a raised counter reverse transom, a skeg-mounted rudder controlled by a tiller and a fixed swept fin keel. It displaces 16,000 lb (7,257 kg) and carries 7,327 lb (3,323 kg) of lead ballast.

The boat has a draft of 6.25 ft (1.91 m) with the standard keel fitted.

The boat is fitted with a Westerbeke 491 diesel engine of 30 hp (22 kW) for docking and maneuvering. The fuel tank holds 30 U.S. gallons (110 L; 25 imp gal) and the fresh water tank has a capacity of 60 U.S. gallons (230 L; 50 imp gal).

The design has sleeping accommodation for eight people, with a bow cabin with a "V"-berth, dual main cabin settee and pilot berths and two quarter berths aft, under the cockpit. The head is located aft of the bow cabin, on the port side.

== See also ==
- List of sailing boat types

Related development

- Catalina 38

Similar sailboats

- Alajuela 38
- C&C 38
- Columbia 38
- Eagle 38
- Farr 38
- Hunter 380
- Hunter 386
- Landfall 38
- Sabre 38
- Shannon 38
