= Hunter 426 =

Sailboat class

Hunter 426 DS
Development
- Designer: Glenn Henderson
- Location: United States
- Year: 2003
- Builder: Hunter Marine
- Name: Hunter 426 DS

Boat
- Displacement: 23,600 lb (10,705 kg)
- Draft: 6.5 ft (2.0 m)

Hull
- Type: Monohull
- Construction: Fiberglass
- LOA: 41.83 ft (12.75 m)
- LWL: 39.17 ft (11.94 m)
- Beam: 14.17 ft (4.32 m)
- Engine: Yanmar 56 hp (42 kW) diesel engine

Hull appendages
- Keel: fin keel
- Ballast: 7,237 lb (3,283 kg)
- Rudder: internally-mounted spade-type rudder

Rig
- Rig type: Bermuda rig
- I foretriangle height: 47.83 ft (14.58 m)
- J foretriangle base: 14.67 ft (4.47 m)
- P mainsail luff: 46.75 ft (14.25 m)
- E mainsail foot: 20.50 ft (6.25 m)

Sails
- Sailplan: Fractional B&R rigged sloop
- Total sail area: 962 sq ft (89.4 m^{2}) actual

Racing
- PHRF: 117 (average)

The Hunter 426 is an American sailboat that was designed by Glenn Henderson as a cruiser and first built as a 2003 model. It was produced in two versions, the 426 AC (Aft Cockpit) and the 426 DS (Deck Salon).

The Hunter 426 DS was developed into the 2003 Hunter 44, with a redesigned aft cabin.

== Production ==
The design was built by Hunter Marine in the United States starting in 2003, but it is now out of production.

== Design ==
The Hunter 426 is a recreational keelboat, built predominantly of fiberglass. It has a fractional sloop B&R rig, a nearly plumb stem, a walk-through reverse transom with a swimming platform and fold-down ladder, an internally mounted spade-type rudder controlled by a wheel and a fixed fin keel or option shoal draft wing keel. It displaces 23,600 lb (10,705 kg) and carries 7,237 lb (3,283 kg) of lead ballast with the fin keel and 7,389 lb (3,352 kg) of lead ballast with the wing keel.

The boat has a draft of 6.50 ft (1.98 m) with the standard keel and 5.00 ft (1.52 m) with the optional shoal draft keel.

The boat is fitted with a Japanese Yanmar diesel engine of 56 hp (42 kW). The fuel tank holds 51 U.S. gallons (190 L; 42 imp gal) and the fresh water tank has a capacity of 140 U.S. gallons (530 L; 120 imp gal).

Factory standard equipment included a 110% roller furling genoa, steel mainsheet arch, four two-speed self tailing winches, marine VHF radio, knotmeter, depth sounder, AM/FM radio DVD and CD player, anchor roller, two fully enclosed heads with showers, private forward and aft cabins, a dinette table that converts to a berth, complete set of kitchen dishes and bedding, microwave oven, dual stainless steel sinks and a two-burner gimbaled liquid petroleum gas stove and oven. Factory options included a liferaft and EPIRB, a double aft cabin, Bimini top, air conditioning, clothing washer and drier, ice maker, in-mast mainsail furling and an electric anchor winch.

The design has a PHRF racing average handicap of 117. It has a hull speed of 8.39 kn (15.54 km/h).

== Variants ==
Hunter 426 AC
This model has a conventional aft cockpit.
Hunter 426 DS
This model has a raised coach house roof and larger ports, giving more headroom and light below decks.

== Operational history ==
In a 2003 review, written by famed naval architect, Robert Perry for Sailing magazine, he wrote, "The styling of this Hunter is strong. The variety of windows and port shapes has a big effect on the overall look of the boat, as does the prominent hull-to-deck joint feature. It's a unique look that obviously continues to find favors with Hunter's clientele."

In another 2003 review in Cruising World, reviewer Darrell Nicholson praised the accommodations and sailing qualities, finding little to fault apart from a "a persistent squeak caused by the exhaust hose". He concluded, "For the kind of cruising that most people do, either version of the Hunter 426 would be a great platform for fun. Whether coastal cruising, island-hopping through the Bahamas, or skating across the bay for a weekend getaway, the Hunter 426 AC and 426 DS offer value that’s rare today in a comparable boat of this size with such standard amenities."

== See also ==
- List of sailing boat types

Related design

- Hunter 44

Similar sailboats

- C&C 43-1
- C&C 43-2
- Hunter 43 Legend
- Hunter 420
- Hunter 430
