= Hunter 43 Legend =

Sailboat class

Development
- Designer: Hunter Design Team
- Location: United States
- Year: 1989
- No. built: unknown (records lost)
- Builder: Hunter Marine
- Name: Hunter 43 Legend

Boat
- Displacement: 23,800 lb (10,795 kg)
- Draft: 4.92 ft (1.50 m)

Hull
- Type: Monohull
- Construction: Fiberglass
- LOA: 42.50 ft (12.95 m)
- LWL: 38.00 ft (11.58 m)
- Beam: 14.00 ft (4.27 m)
- Engine: Yanmar 4JH2-E FWC 55 hp (41 kW) diesel engine

Hull appendages
- Keel: wing keel
- Ballast: 7,600 lb (3,447 kg)
- Rudder: internally-mounted spade-type rudder

Rig
- Rig type: Bermuda rig
- I foretriangle height: 52.00 ft (15.85 m)
- J foretriangle base: 14.25 ft (4.34 m)
- P mainsail luff: 53.50 ft (16.31 m)
- E mainsail foot: 17.75 ft (5.41 m)

Sails
- Sailplan: Fractional B&R rigged sloop
- Mainsail area: 474.81 sq ft (44.111 m^{2})
- Jib/genoa area: 370.50 sq ft (34.421 m^{2})
- Total sail area: 845.31 sq ft (78.532 m^{2})

The Hunter 43 Legend is an American sailboat that was designed by the Hunter Design Team as a cruiser and first built in 1989.

The Hunter 43 Legend design was developed into the 1995 Hunter 430 which has a similar hull, but different interior arrangement.

== Production ==
The design was built by Hunter Marine in the United States between 1989 and 1993, but it is now out of production. The design's construction records were lost when the company went through bankruptcy and emerged as Marlow-Hunter in 2012 and the number of Hunter 43 Legends that were completed is not known.

== Design ==
The Hunter 43 Legend is a recreational keelboat, built predominantly of fiberglass. It has a fractional sloop B&R rig, a raked stem, a walk-through reverse transom with a swimming platform and a folding ladder, an internally mounted spade-type rudder controlled by a wheel and a fixed wing keel. It displaces 23,800 lb (10,795 kg) and carries 7,600 lb (3,447 kg) of ballast.

The boat has a draft of 4.92 ft (1.50 m) with the standard wing keel fitted.

The boat is fitted with a Japanese Yanmar 4JH2-E FWC diesel engine of 55 hp (41 kW). The fuel tank holds 53 U.S. gallons (200 L; 44 imp gal) and the fresh water tank has a capacity of 158 U.S. gallons (600 L; 132 imp gal).

The design has a hull speed of 8.26 kn (15.30 km/h).

== Operational history ==
In a 2017 review of the design, Sailing magazine writer David Liscio praised the interior accommodations and the sailing qualities. He noted, "During an early-fall sail aboard Sea Fever in Narragansett Bay, the boat consistently outran the other vessels in the fleet. In 25 knots of wind and large swells, the boat handled admirably ... As promised, the boat was both maneuverable and predictable, easily pointing high into the wind. Its large rudder made backing into the slip less challenging." Of the design he concluded, " Owners love these boats because they’re relatively fast, responsive to the touch, easy to handle, comfortable below deck and offer amenities typically valued by cruisers. Wheel steering, a walk-through transom with swim platform, anchor well and rollers, removable helm seat, adjustable mainsheet traveler, lines that lead back to the cockpit, and two pairs of two-speed, self-tailing winches, are usually enough to keep owners smiling."

== See also ==
- List of sailing boat types

Related development

- Hunter 430

Similar sailboats

- C&C 43-1
- C&C 43-2
- Hunter 420
- Hunter 426
