= Hunter 37.5 Legend =

Sailboat class

Development
- Designer: Hunter Design Group
- Location: United States
- Year: 1990
- Builder: Hunter Marine
- Name: Hunter 37.5 Legend

Boat
- Displacement: 16,400 lb (7,439 kg)
- Draft: 4.75 ft (1.45 m)

Hull
- Type: Monohull
- Construction: Fiberglass
- LOA: 37.00 ft (11.28 m)
- LWL: 31.75 ft (9.68 m)
- Beam: 12.75 ft (3.89 m)
- Engine: Yanmar 3HM35F 34 hp (25 kW) 3HM35F diesel engine

Hull appendages
- Keel: fin keel
- Ballast: 5,900 lb (2,676 kg)
- Rudder: internally-mounted spade-type rudder

Rig
- Rig type: Bermuda rig
- I foretriangle height: 48.00 ft (14.63 m)
- J foretriangle base: 13.50 ft (4.11 m)
- P mainsail luff: 49.00 ft (14.94 m)
- E mainsail foot: 15.50 ft (4.72 m)

Sails
- Sailplan: Fractional rigged sloop
- Mainsail area: 379.75 sq ft (35.280 m^{2})
- Jib/genoa area: 324.00 sq ft (30.101 m^{2})
- Total sail area: 703.75 sq ft (65.381 m^{2})

Racing
- PHRF: 111 (average)

The Hunter 37.5 Legend is an American sailboat that was designed by the Hunter Design Group and first built in 1990.

== Production ==
The design was built by Hunter Marine in the United States from 1990 to 1997, but it is now out of production.

== Design ==
The Hunter 37.5 Legend is a recreational keelboat, built predominantly of fiberglass, with wood trim. It has a fractional sloop rig, a raked stem, a walk-through reverse transom with a swimming platform and ladder, an internally mounted spade-type rudder controlled by a wheel and a fixed fin keel. It displaces 16,400 lb (7,439 kg) and carries 5,900 lb (2,676 kg) of ballast.

The boat has a draft of 4.75 ft (1.45 m) with the standard keelfitted.

The boat is fitted with a Japanese Yanmar 3HM35F diesel engine of 34 hp (25 kW). The fuel tank holds 35 U.S. gallons (130 L; 29 imp gal) and the fresh water tank has a capacity of 75 U.S. gallons (280 L; 62 imp gal). The holding tank is 25 U.S. gallons (95 L; 21 imp gal).

The boat was designed using CAD software. Standard factory equipment supplied included 130% roller furling genoa, fully battened mainsail, self-tailing winches, fore and aft cabins, sleeping accommodation for seven people, built-in solar panel, knotmeter, depth sounder, marine VHF radio, a teak and holly cabin sole, compressed natural gas stove and oven, anchor, a fog bell, emergency tiller and life jackets.

The design has a PHRF racing average handicap of 111 with a high of 126 and low of 96. It has a hull speed of 7.55 kn (13.98 km/h).

== See also ==
- List of sailing boat types

Similar sailboats

- Hunter 37
- Hunter 37 Legend
- Hunter 376
