= C&C 38 =

Sailboat class

C&C 38-1
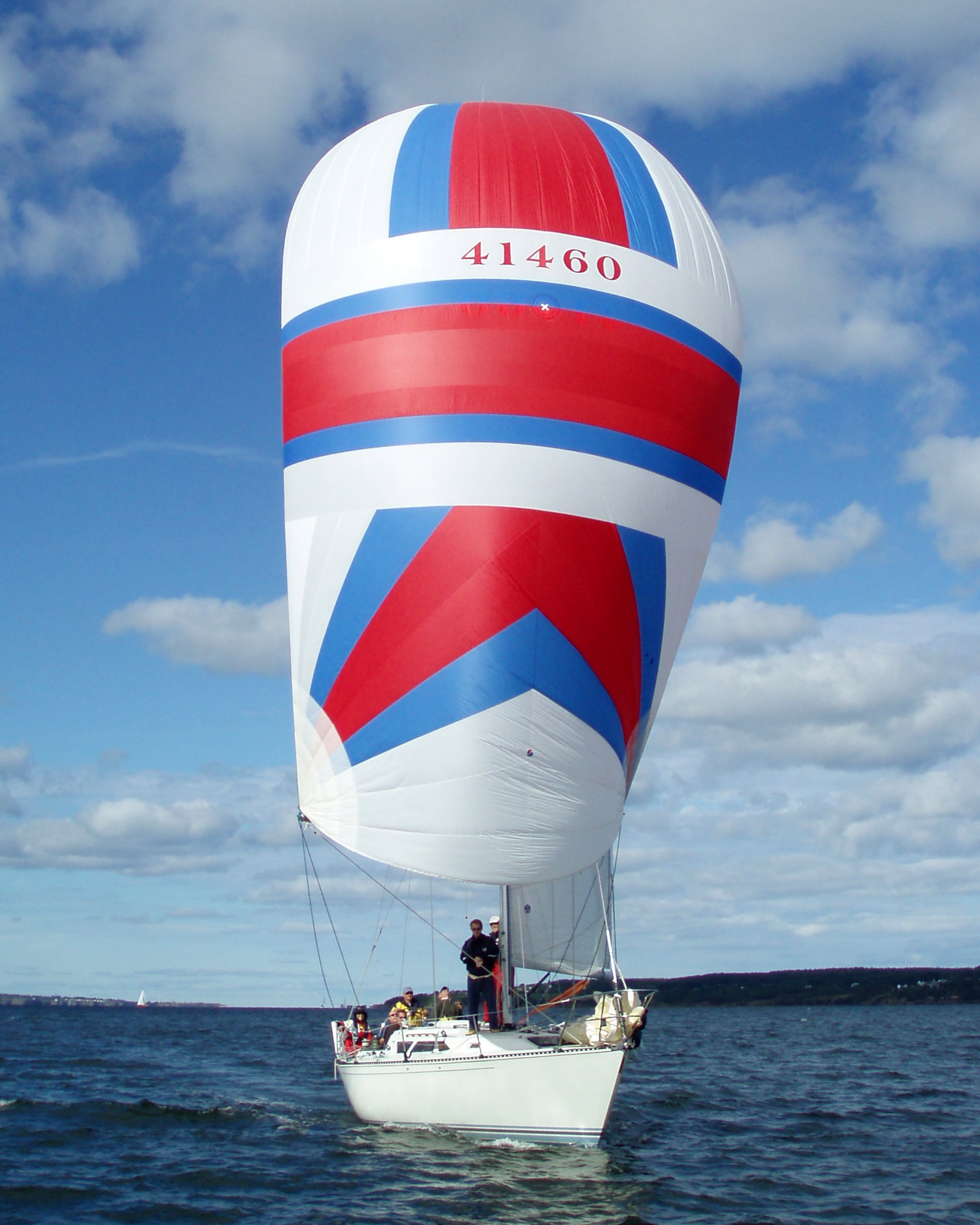
- C&C 38-3

Development
- Designer: C&C Design
- Location: Canada
- Year: 1973
- Builder: C&C Yachts
- Name: C&C 38-1

Boat
- Displacement: 14,700 lb (6,668 kg)
- Draft: 6.42 ft (1.96 m)

Hull
- Type: Monohull
- Construction: Fiberglass
- LOA: 37.58 ft (11.45 m)
- LWL: 29.33 ft (8.94 m)
- Beam: 12.18 ft (3.71 m)
- Engine: Universal Atomic 4 37 hp (28 kW) gasoline engine

Hull appendages
- Keel: fin keel
- Ballast: 4,400 lb (1,996 kg)
- Rudder: internally-mounted spade-type rudder

Rig
- Rig type: Bermuda rig
- I foretriangle height: 49.50 ft (15.09 m)
- J foretriangle base: 16.30 ft (4.97 m)
- P mainsail luff: 44.00 ft (13.41 m)
- E mainsail foot: 12.30 ft (3.75 m)

Sails
- Sailplan: Masthead sloop
- Mainsail area: 270.60 sq ft (25.140 m^{2})
- Jib/genoa area: 403.43 sq ft (37.480 m^{2})
- Total sail area: 674.03 sq ft (62.619 m^{2})

Racing
- PHRF: 114 (average)

The C&C 38 is a series of Canadian sailboats, that were all designed by C&C Design and first built in 1973.

== Production ==
The boats were built by C&C Yachts in Canada, but are now out of production.

== Design ==
The C&C 38 series are all a small recreational keelboats, built predominantly of fiberglass, with wood trim. They all have masthead sloop rigs and internally-mounted spade-type rudders.

The series includes three designs, the C&C 38 (subsequently called the 38-1 to differentiate it from the later models), the 38-2 and the 38-3. The latter boat was an entirely new design.

The 38-2 was used as the basis for the Landfall 38, built with the same hull shape, but a shorter keel and rig, plus a different interior.

== Variants ==
C&C 38 (also later called the 38-1)
This model was introduced in 1973, with production ending in 1975. It has a length overall of 37.58 ft (11.5 m), a waterline length of 29.33 ft (8.9 m), displaces 14,700 lb (6,668 kg) and carries 4,400 lb (1,996 kg) of ballast. The boat has a draft of 6.42 ft (1.96 m) with the standard keel fitted. The boat is fitted with a Universal Atomic 4 37 hp (28 kW) gasoline engine. The boat has a PHRF racing average handicap of 14 with a high of 123 and low of 102. It has a hull speed of 7.26 kn (13.45 km/h).
C&C 38-2
This model was introduced in 1975, with 98 examples built. It was a development of the 38-1, optimized by C&C Chief of Design Robert W. Ball for International Offshore Rule racing. It has a length overall of 37.58 ft (11.5 m), a waterline length of 29.58 ft (9.0 m). The standard keel version displaces 14,700 lb (6,668 kg) and carries 6,800 lb (3,084 kg) of lead ballast. The boat has a draft of 6.08 ft (1.85 m) with the standard keel fitted. The boat is fitted with a Universal Atomic 4 37 hp (28 kW) gasoline engine. The fuel tank holds 20 U.S. gallons (76 L; 17 imp gal) and the fresh water tank has a capacity of 60 U.S. gallons (230 L; 50 imp gal). The boat has a PHRF racing average handicap of 114 with a high of 117 and low of 112. It has a hull speed of 7.29 kn (13.50 km/h). In 1978 the design was developed into the Baltic 37.

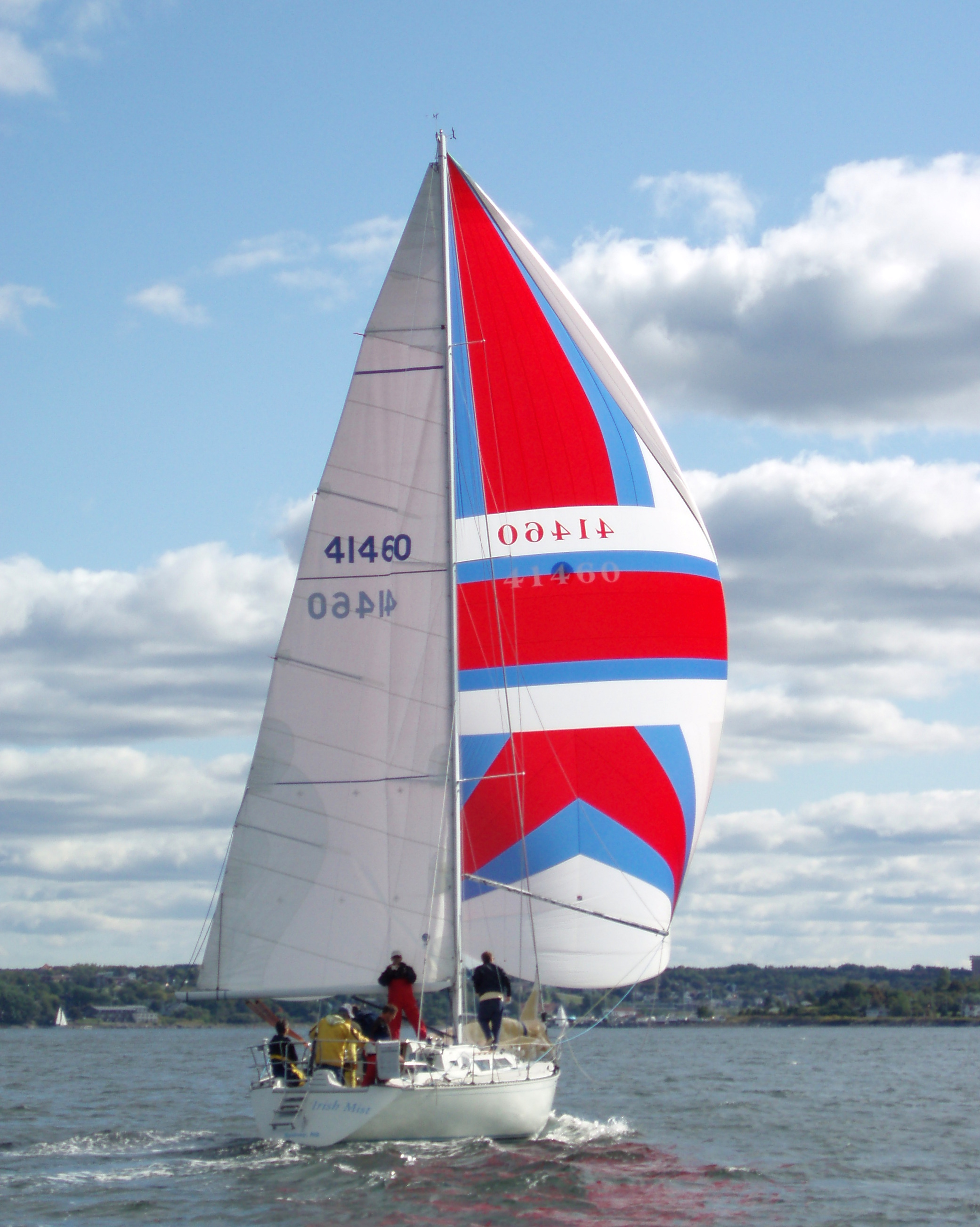
C&C 38-3

C&C 38-3
This model was a completely new design, introduced in 1985. It has a length overall of 37.55 ft (11.4 m), a waterline length of 31.00 ft (9.4 m), displaces 14,275 lb (6,475 kg) and carries 6,246 lb (2,833 kg) of lead ballast. The boat has a draft of 7.50 ft (2.29 m) with the standard keel, 5.00 ft (1.52 m) with the optional shoal draft keel and 5.50 ft (1.68 m) with the optional wing keel. A stub keel and centreboard version was also built, with a draft of 7.75 ft (2.36 m) with the centreboard extended and 4.92 ft (1.50 m) with it retracted. The boat is fitted with a Japanese Yanmar YHM35F diesel engine. The fuel tank holds 20 U.S. gallons (76 L; 17 imp gal) and the fresh water tank has a capacity of 60 U.S. gallons (230 L; 50 imp gal). The standard keel boat has a PHRF racing average handicap of 105 with a high of 114 and low of 102. The wing keel version has an average handicap of 108 with a high of 111 and low of 108. The centreboard version has an average handicap of 117 with a high of 126 and low of 117. All versions have hull speeds of 7.46 kn (13.82 km/h).

== See also ==
- List of sailing boat types

Related development

- Baltic 37
- Landfall 38

Similar sailboats

- Alajuela 38
- Catalina 38
- Catalina 375
- Columbia 38
- Eagle 38
- Farr 38
- Hunter 38
- Hunter 380
- Hunter 386
- Sabre 38
- Shannon 38
- Yankee 38
