= Hunter 376 =

Sailboat class

Development
- Designer: Hunter Design Team
- Location: United States
- Year: 1996
- Builder: Hunter Marine
- Name: Hunter 376

Boat
- Displacement: 15,000 lb (6,804 kg)
- Draft: 5.00 ft (1.52 m)

Hull
- Type: Monohull
- Construction: Fiberglass
- LOA: 37.25 ft (11.35 m)
- LWL: 32.00 ft (9.75 m)
- Beam: 12.58 ft (3.83 m)
- Engine: Yanmar 36 hp (27 kW) diesel engine

Hull appendages
- Keel: wing keel
- Ballast: 5,400 lb (2,449 kg) of lead
- Rudder: internally-mounted spade-type rudder

Rig
- Rig type: Bermuda rig
- I foretriangle height: 48.00 ft (14.63 m)
- J foretriangle base: 12.92 ft (3.94 m)
- P mainsail luff: 49.00 ft (14.94 m)
- E mainsail foot: 15.25 ft (4.65 m)

Sails
- Sailplan: Fractional B&R rigged sloop
- Mainsail area: 373.63 sq ft (34.711 m^{2})
- Jib/genoa area: 310.08 sq ft (28.807 m^{2})
- Total sail area: 683.71 sq ft (63.519 m^{2})

Racing
- PHRF: 150 (average)

The Hunter 376 is an American sailboat that was designed by the Hunter Design Team as a cruiser and first built in 1996.

The Hunter 376 shares a common hull with the Hunter 386 and the Hunter 380.

== Production ==
The design was built by Hunter Marine in the United States between 1996 and 1998.

== Design ==
The Hunter 376 is a recreational keelboat, built predominantly of fiberglass. It has a fractional sloop B&R rig, a raked stem, a walk-through reverse transom, an internally mounted spade-type rudder controlled by a wheel and a fixed wing keel or fin keel. It displaces 15,000 lb (6,804 kg) and carries 5,400 lb (2,449 kg) of lead ballast.

The boat has a draft of 5.00 ft (1.52 m) with the standard wing keel and 6.50 ft (1.98 m) with the optional deep draft fin keel.

The boat is fitted with a Japanese Yanmar diesel engine of 36 hp (27 kW). The fuel tank holds 35 U.S. gallons (130 L; 29 imp gal) and the fresh water tank has a capacity of 75 U.S. gallons (280 L; 62 imp gal).

The cabin headroom is 78 in (198 cm).

Factory standard equipment included a 110% roller furling genoa, four two-speed self tailing winches, anodized spars, marine VHF radio, knotmeter, depth sounder, AM/FM radio and CD player with four speakers, dual anchor rollers, hot and cold water cockpit shower, integral solar panel, indirect cabin lighting, teak and holly cabin sole, fully enclosed head with shower, private forward and aft cabins, a dinette table that converts to a berth, complete set of kitchen dishes, microwave oven, dual sinks, three-burner gimbaled liquid petroleum gas stove and oven and life jackets. Factory options included a deep draft keel, a double aft cabin, air conditioning, electric anchor winch and leather cushions.

The design has a PHRF racing average handicap of 150 with a high of 165 and low of 129. It has a hull speed of 7.58 kn (14.04 km/h).

== See also ==
- List of sailing boat types

Related development

- Hunter 380
- Hunter 386

Similar sailboats

- Catalina 375
- Eagle 38
- Hunter 37
- Hunter 37 Legend
- Hunter 37.5 Legend
