= Columbia 38 =

Sailboat class

Development
- Designer: Charles Morgan
- Location: United States
- Year: 1965
- No. built: 39
- Builder: Columbia Yachts
- Name: Columbia 38

Boat
- Displacement: 14,000 lb (6,350 kg)
- Draft: 5.75 ft (1.75 m)

Hull
- Type: Monohull
- Construction: Fiberglass
- LOA: 38.92 ft (11.86 m)
- LWL: 25.75 ft (7.85 m)
- Beam: 10.67 ft (3.25 m)
- Engine: Universal Atomic 4 30 hp (22 kW) gasoline engine

Hull appendages
- Keel: long keel
- Ballast: 6,400 lb (2,903 kg)
- Rudder: internally-mounted spade-type rudder

Rig
- Rig type: Bermuda rig
- I foretriangle height: 43.50 ft (13.26 m)
- J foretriangle base: 16.00 ft (4.88 m)
- P mainsail luff: 37.80 ft (11.52 m)
- E mainsail foot: 16.00 ft (4.88 m)

Sails
- Sailplan: Masthead sloop
- Mainsail area: 302.40 sq ft (28.094 m^{2})
- Jib/genoa area: 348.00 sq ft (32.330 m^{2})
- Total sail area: 650.40 sq ft (60.424 m^{2})

The Columbia 38 is an American sailboat that was designed by Charles Morgan as racer-cruiser and first built in 1965.

The Columbia 38 is a development of the Columbia 40.

== Production ==
The design was built by Columbia Yachts in the United States. The company completed 39 examples between 1965 and 1967.

== Design ==
The Columbia 38 is a recreational keelboat, built predominantly of fiberglass, with wood trim. It has a masthead sloop rig, a spooned raked stem, a raised counter transom, an internally mounted spade-type rudder and a fixed modified long keel or optional short keel with a centerboard.

The boat is fitted with a Universal Atomic 4 30 hp (22 kW) gasoline engine for docking and maneuvering. The fuel tank holds 25 U.S. gallons (95 L; 21 imp gal) and the fresh water tank also has a capacity of 25 U.S. gallons (95 L; 21 imp gal).

The galley is located at the foot of the companionway steps on the port side and features a three-burner stove. The head is located forward on the port side, just aft of the bow "V"-berth and includes a privacy door. A hanging locker is provided opposite the head on the starboard side. Additional sleeping accommodation is found in the main cabin and includes the dinette table, which can be dropped to form a double berth, a single settee berth and an aft quarter berth.

== Variants ==
Columbia 38
This model has a fixed modified long keel. It has a length overall of 38.92 ft (11.9 m), a waterline length of 25.75 ft (7.8 m), displaces 14,000 lb (6,350 kg) and carries 6,400 lb (2,903 kg) of ballast. The boat has a draft of 5.75 ft (1.75 m) with the standard keel.
Columbia 38 CB
This model has a shoal draft modified long keel and a retractable centerboard. It has a length overall of 38.92 ft (11.9 m), a waterline length of 26.50 ft (8.1 m), displaces 16,500 lb (7,484 kg) and carries 5,400 lb (2,449 kg) of ballast. The boat has a draft of 8.92 ft (2.72 m) with the centerboard extended and 4.42 ft (1.35 m) with it retracted.

== See also ==
- List of sailing boat types

Related development

- Columbia 40

Similar sailboats

- Alajuela 38
- C&C 38
- Catalina 38
- Catalina 375
- Farr 38
- Hunter 380
- Landfall 38
- Sabre 38
- Shannon 38
- Yankee 38
