= Catalina 375 =

Sailboat class

Development
- Designer: Gerry Douglas
- Location: United States
- Year: 2008
- Builder: Catalina Yachts
- Role: Cruiser
- Name: Catalina 375

Boat
- Displacement: 15,500 lb (7,031 kg)
- Draft: 6.83 ft (2.08 m)

Hull
- Type: Monohull
- Construction: Fiberglass
- LOA: 38.50 ft (11.73 m)
- LWL: 34.42 ft (10.49 m)
- Beam: 13.00 ft (3.96 m)
- Engine: Yanmar 40 hp (30 kW) diesel engine

Hull appendages
- Keel: fin keel
- Ballast: 5,200 lb (2,359 kg)
- Rudder: internally-mounted spade-type rudder

Rig
- Rig type: Bermuda rig
- I foretriangle height: 47.58 ft (14.50 m)
- J foretriangle base: 14.75 ft (4.50 m)
- P mainsail luff: 43.50 ft (13.26 m)
- E mainsail foot: 13.58 ft (4.14 m)

Sails
- Sailplan: Fractional rigged sloop
- Mainsail area: 295.37 sq ft (27.441 m^{2})
- Jib/genoa area: 350.90 sq ft (32.600 m^{2})
- Total sail area: 646.27 sq ft (60.040 m^{2})

The Catalina 375 is an American sailboat that was designed by Gerry Douglas as a cruiser and first built in 2008.

The design replaced the Catalina 36 Mark II in the company line.

== Production ==
The design was built by Catalina Yachts in the United States, but it is now out of production.

== Design ==
The Catalina 375 is a recreational keelboat, built predominantly of solid, hand-laid knitted fiberglass, with vinyl ester resin and an integral structural grid. There are balsa cores on the cabin top and decks. There is no structural wood on the design. It has a fractional sloop rig, a raked stem, a rounded, walk-through reverse transom with a swimming platform, an internally mounted spade-type rudder controlled by a wheel and a fixed fin keel or optional wing keel. It displaces 15,500 lb (7,031 kg) and carries 5,200 lb (2,359 kg) of lead ballast.

The boat has a draft of 6.83 ft (2.08 m) with the standard keel and 4.67 ft (1.42 m) with the optional shoal draft keel.

The boat is fitted with a Japanese Yanmar diesel engine of 40 hp (30 kW). The fuel tank holds 40 U.S. gallons (150 L; 33 imp gal), the fresh water tank has a capacity of 97 U.S. gallons (370 L; 81 imp gal), plus a holding tank of 31 U.S. gallons (120 L; 26 imp gal). There are compartments for generator and air-conditioning units.

The design features two cockpit-mounted Harken 44 jib winches and two additional electric winches on the cabin top for the mainsail and halyards. There is a split anchor locker designed to hold two anchor rodes, raised by a Maxwell 1000 windlass. The standard factory-supplied rig includes an in-mast furling mainsail equipped with vertical battens.

The cabin woodwork is of teak, with a cabin sole made from Lonseal. The gallery is located on the starboard side at the foot of the companionway steps. A cabin with a queen-sized berth is located aft. The main cabin has a folding table and settees, plus a folding bench seat. The forward "V"-berth is an island queen-style and includes a head with a shower.

== Operational history ==
In a Cruising World review in 2008, Mark Pillsbury praised the design's interior, fittings and handling under sail and power.

A 2008 Sail magazine report said of the handling, "We had 12 knots of warm Florida breeze, flat water, and lots of time to put the boat through its paces. Unlike many new boats that fly blade jibs and large mains with fat roaches, the 375 flies a conservative in-mast-furling main and an overlapping (135 percent) jib. The benefits of this configuration speak for themselves. Sailhandling is easy, and there’s still plenty of sail-area horsepower. Upwind during our sail, speeds hovered around 6 knots and crept up to the low 7s when I drove for maximum speed in the puffs. We tacked through 85 degrees, and I could have pinched a little higher (and sacrificed a little speed) if I needed to. Tacking the jib requires more winch grinding than a smaller blade jib would, but it’s hardly a problem. On a beam reach we were trucking along in the 7-knot range as easy as you please. The helm was smooth, and so was our motion through the water."

Yacht designer Robert Perry reviewed the design in 2008 for Sailing Magazine and noted, "The hull form shows a fine entry coupled with plenty of beam aft. The L/B is 2.87, which indicates a beamy boat, but relatively speaking the 375 is slightly less beamy than the rest of the Catalina series. The research group determined that the freeboard of the boat should be similar to that of the 36, giving the new boat more classic proportions and avoiding the exaggerated high freeboard of many of today's current production models."

== See also ==
- List of sailing boat types

Related development

- Catalina 36

Similar sailboats

- C&C 38
- Columbia 38
- Eagle 38
- Hunter 38
- Hunter 376
- Hunter 380
- Hunter 386
- Landfall 38
