= Hunter 37 Legend =

Sailboat class

Development
- Designer: Warren Luhrs
- Location: United States
- Year: 1986
- Builder: Hunter Marine
- Name: Hunter 37 Legend

Boat
- Displacement: 14,900 lb (6,759 kg)
- Draft: 6.67 ft (2.03 m)

Hull
- Type: Monohull
- Construction: Fiberglass
- LOA: 37.50 ft (11.43 m)
- LWL: 31.33 ft (9.55 m)
- Beam: 12.83 ft (3.91 m)
- Engine: Yanmar 3HM35F 34 hp (25 kW) diesel engine

Hull appendages
- Keel: fin keel
- Ballast: 6,000 lb (2,722 kg)
- Rudder: internally-mounted spade-type rudder

Rig
- Rig type: Bermuda rig
- I foretriangle height: 48.00 ft (14.63 m)
- J foretriangle base: 13.50 ft (4.11 m)
- P mainsail luff: 49.00 ft (14.94 m)
- E mainsail foot: 15.50 ft (4.72 m)

Sails
- Sailplan: Fractional sloop
- Mainsail area: 379.75 sq ft (35.280 m^{2})
- Jib/genoa area: 324.00 sq ft (30.101 m^{2})
- Total sail area: 703.75 sq ft (65.381 m^{2})

The Hunter 37 Legend is an American sailboat that was designed by Hunter Marine founder Warren Luhrs and first built in 1986.

The Hunter 37 Legend is sometimes confused with the unrelated 1978 Hunter 37 design.

== Production ==
The design was built by Hunter Marine in the United States between 1986 and 1989 (https://www.marlow-hunter.com/our-fleet/previous-models/), but it is now out of production.

== Design ==
The Hunter 37 Legend is a recreational keelboat, built predominantly of fiberglass, with wood trim. It has a fractional sloop rig, a raked stem, a reverse transom, an internally-mounted spade-type rudder controlled by a wheel and a fixed fin keel or optional wing keel. It displaces 14,900 lb (6,759 kg) and carries 6,000 lb (2,722 kg) of ballast.

The boat has a draft of 6.67 ft (2.03 m) with the standard keel and 4.75 ft (1.45 m) with the optional shoal draft wing keel.

The boat is fitted with a Japanese Yanmar 3HM35F diesel engine of 34 hp (25 kW). The fuel tank holds 33 U.S. gallons (120 L; 27 imp gal) and the fresh water tank has a capacity of 71 U.S. gallons (270 L; 59 imp gal).

The wing keel version of the design has a PHRF racing average handicap of 108 with a high of 121 and low of 99. All models have hull speeds of 7.5 kn (13.89 km/h).

== See also ==
- List of sailing boat types

Similar sailboats

- Hunter 37
- Hunter 37.5 Legend
- Hunter 376
