= Landfall 38 =

Sailboat class

Development
- Designer: Robert W. Ball of C&C Design
- Location: Canada
- Year: 1979
- No. built: 180
- Builder: C&C Yachts
- Name: Landfall 38

Boat
- Displacement: 16,700 lb (7,575 kg)
- Draft: 5.00 ft (1.52 m)

Hull
- Type: Monohull
- Construction: Fibreglass
- LOA: 37.58 ft (11.45 m)
- LWL: 30.17 ft (9.20 m)
- Beam: 12.00 ft (3.66 m)
- Engine: Yanmar 3HM/3QM 30 hp (22 kW) diesel engine

Hull appendages
- Keel: fin keel
- Ballast: 6,500 lb (2,948 kg)
- Rudder: internally-mounted spade-type rudder

Rig
- Rig type: Bermuda rig
- I foretriangle height: 47.20 ft (14.39 m)
- J foretriangle base: 16.20 ft (4.94 m)
- P mainsail luff: 41.80 ft (12.74 m)
- E mainsail foot: 12.70 ft (3.87 m)

Sails
- Sailplan: Masthead sloop
- Mainsail area: 265.43 sq ft (24.659 m^{2})
- Jib/genoa area: 382.32 sq ft (35.519 m^{2})
- Total sail area: 647.75 sq ft (60.178 m^{2})

Racing
- PHRF: 120

The Landfall 38 is a sailboat that was designed by Robert W. Ball, the chief designer of C&C Design and first built in 1979. The Landfall series, begun with the Landfall 42, was part of a trend within C&C Yachts to develop more cruising-oriented designs under company president George Cuthbertson's direction during the later 1970s and early 1980s.

The Landfall 38 is a development of the C&C 38-2 and used the same hull molds for construction, but was built with shallower keel and shorter rig, plus a totally different interior.

== Production ==
The design was built by the Canadian company, C&C Yachts, at their Rhode Island, United States plant between 1979 and 1985, but it is now out of production. A total of 185 examples were completed.

== Design ==
The Landfall 38 is a recreational keelboat, built predominantly of fibreglass, with a balsawood cored deck and hull and with wood trim. It has a masthead sloop rig, a raked stem, a raised and almost vertical transom, an internally-mounted spade-type rudder controlled by a wheel and a fixed fin keel. It displaces 16,700 lb (7,575 kg) and carries 6,500 lb (2,948 kg) of ballast.

The boat has a draft of 5.00 ft (1.52 m) with the standard keel fitted.

The boat is fitted with a Japanese Yanmar 3HM or 3QM diesel engine of 30 hp (22 kW). The fuel tank holds 30 U.S. gallons (110 L; 25 imp gal) and the fresh water tank has a capacity of 103 U.S. gallons (390 L; 86 imp gal).

The design has a hull speed of 7.36 kn (13.63 km/h).

== Operational history ==
John Kretschmer, writing in Sailing Magazine in 2008 said of the design: "The prime reason why the C&C Landfall 38 is a desirable used boat is because of the way it sails. It points high and tracks well. It has a soft motion in a seaway and accelerates nicely off the wind. The rudder is located well aft, providing good steering control while reaching. Most sail controls are within arm's reach of the helm, making the boat user-friendly. It's nimble enough under power and can be conned into tight slips without too much fuss. Many years ago I delivered a Landfall 38 south from New England to Fort Lauderdale. We encountered a pretty serious blow off Cape Lookout. We were reduced to forereaching with a deeply furled headsail and double reefed main. I was impressed how well the Landfall handled the steep seas. We didn't pound and we didn't miss a meal. My only complaint was that when the gale blew through we were becalmed and had to resort to motoring, which is definitely not the Landfall's best "point of sail." ... If I was looking for a boat for a yearlong Caribbean sabbatical and had less than $70,000 to spend, I'd put the C&C Landfall 38 at the top of my list. It is well built, cleverly designed both on deck and below, and sails nicely. It is also handsome. And it also has a great name."

Practical Sailor magazine describes the design, "The Landfall 38 is stiff and well-balanced under sail. Owners report that she is as fast or faster than similar boats of the same size. The Landfall 38’s PHRF rating, for example, is 120, squarely between the 114 of the Cal 39 and the 126 of the Tartan 37— two boats to which the Landfall 38 will inevitably be compared in size, type, and price ... To our way of thinking, performance cruising is what it’s all about. It’s all well and good to have a heavy, underrigged boat if you’re cruising around the world. Most people’s cruising, however, is limited to a few weeks a year, with moderate distances between ports, and schedules that have to be met. A boat that will get you there fast, safely, and in comfort is a highly desirable type of boat for this kind of cruising. From a performance viewpoint, the Landfall 38 meets those requirements." ... "General design and construction are excellent. The hull is a proven design, the rig is efficient and strong. There are a number of design details that should be improved for serious cruising, notably the companionway, cockpit protection, life raft storage, and provision for shorthanded handling under sail ... A serious cruising boat must function as well bashing to windward for days on end as it does at the dock. Above all, it must keep its crew dry and comfortable. We have yet to find the perfect cruising boat, but many of the things we’d look for are found in the Landfall 38. We wish they were all there, but the fact that they aren’t is what keeps designers and builders in business."

== See also ==
- List of sailing boat types

Related development

- C&C 38-2

Similar sailboats

- Alajuela 38
- C&C 38
- Catalina 38
- Catalina 375
- Columbia 38
- Eagle 38
- Farr 38
- Hunter 38
- Hunter 380
- Hunter 386
- Sabre 38
- Shannon 38
- Yankee 38
