= C&C 43-2 =

Sailboat class

Development
- Designer: C&C Design
- Location: Canada
- Year: 1980
- Builder: C&C Yachts

Boat
- Displacement: 18,900 lb (8,573 kg)
- Draft: 8.10 ft (2.47 m)

Hull
- Type: Monohull
- Construction: Fibreglass
- LOA: 43.00 ft (13.11 m)
- LWL: 34.67 ft (10.57 m)
- Beam: 13.83 ft (4.22 m)
- Engine: Volvo Penta MD17 diesel engine

Hull appendages
- Keel: fin keel
- Rudder: internally-mounted spade-type rudder

Rig
- Rig type: Bermuda rig
- I foretriangle height: 57.00 ft (17.37 m)
- J foretriangle base: 17.30 ft (5.27 m)
- P mainsail luff: 50.50 ft (15.39 m)
- E mainsail foot: 14.00 ft (4.27 m)

Sails
- Sailplan: Masthead sloop
- Mainsail area: 353.50 sq ft (32.841 m^{2})
- Jib/genoa area: 493.05 sq ft (45.806 m^{2})
- Total sail area: 846.55 sq ft (78.647 m^{2})

Racing
- PHRF: 72 (average)

The C&C 43-2 is a Canadian sailboat, that was designed by C&C Design as an International Offshore Rule racer and first built in 1980.

The design was marketed as the C&C 43, but is usually referred to as the 43-2 to differentiate it from the unrelated 1971 C&C 43-1 design.

== Production ==
The design was built by C&C Yachts in Canada, but it is now out of production.

== Design ==
The C&C 43-2 is a small recreational keelboat, built predominantly of fibreglass. It has a masthead sloop rig and an internally-mounted spade-type/transom-hung rudder. It displaces 18,900 lb (8,573 kg).

The boat has a draft of 8.10 ft (2.47 m) with the standard keel fitted.

The boat is fitted with a Swedish Volvo Penta MD17 diesel engine. The fuel tank holds 27 U.S. gallons (100 L; 22 imp gal) and the fresh water tank has a capacity of 20 U.S. gallons (76 L; 17 imp gal).

The design has a PHRF racing average handicap of 72 with a high of 66 and low of 81. It has a hull speed of 7.89 kn (14.61 km/h).

== See also ==
- List of sailing boat types

Related development

- C&C 43-1

Similar sailboats

- Hunter 43 Legend
- Hunter 420
- Hunter 426
- Hunter 430
