= Eagle 38 =

Sailboat class

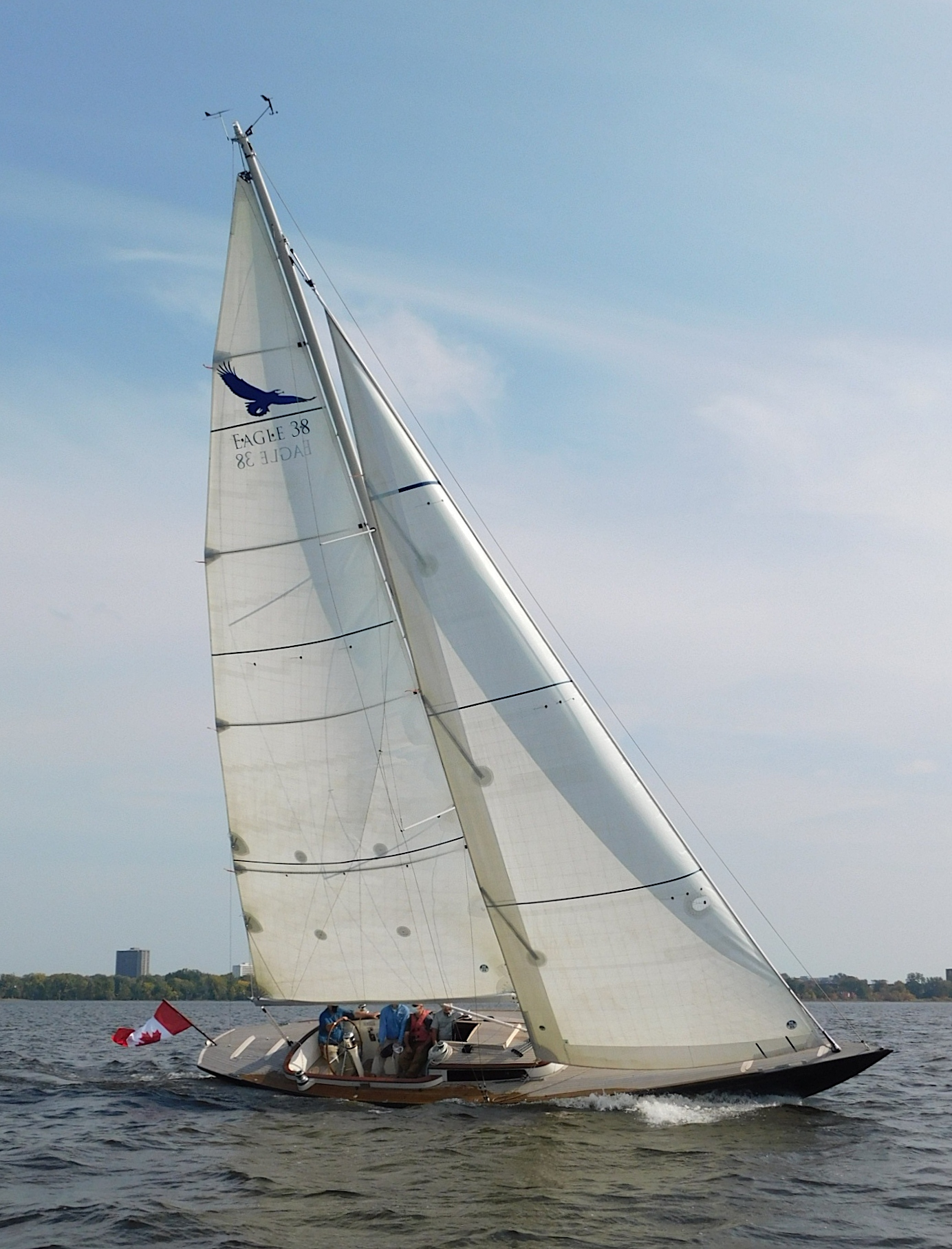

Development
- Designer: Hoek Design
- Location: Netherlands
- Year: 2019
- Builder: Leonardo Yachts
- Role: Day sailer
- Name: Eagle 38

Boat
- Displacement: 8,378 lb (3,800 kg)
- Draft: 4.10 ft (1.25 m)

Hull
- Type: Monohull
- Construction: Glassfibre
- LOA: 38.62 ft (11.77 m)
- Beam: 8.53 ft (2.60 m)
- Engine: Volvo D1-13 saildrive 12 hp (9 kW) diesel engine

Hull appendages
- Keel: fin keel with weighted bulb
- Ballast: 2,976 lb (1,350 kg)
- Rudder: internally-mounted spade-type rudder

Rig
- Rig type: Bermuda rig

Sails
- Sailplan: Fractional rigged sloop
- Total sail area: 643.68 sq ft (59.800 m^{2})

The Eagle 38 is a Dutch sailboat that was designed by Hoek Design as a day sailer and first built in 2019.

== Production ==
The design has been built by Leonardo Yachts, based in Sneek, Netherlands, since 2019 and remains in production.

It was designed to resemble a J-class yacht of the early 20th century, but the manufacturer markets the boat as a daysailer with minimal accommodation for overnight trips.

== Design ==
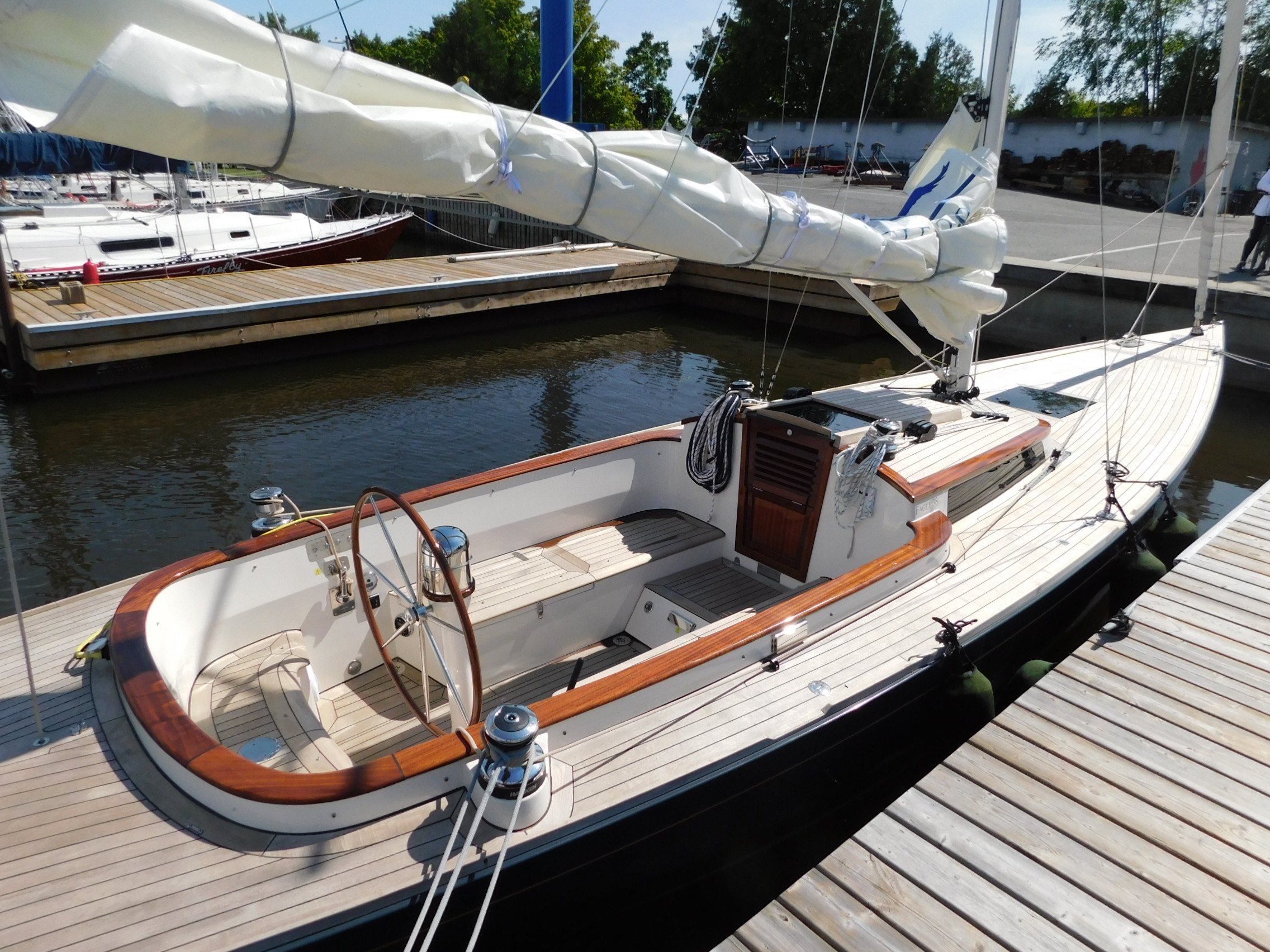
Eagle 38 cockpit

The Eagle 38 is a recreational keelboat, built predominantly of glassfibre, with wood trim. It has a fractional sloop rig, a sharply raked stem, a raised counter transom, an internally mounted spade-type rudder controlled by a wheel and a fixed fin keel with a weighted bulb. It displaces 8,378 lb (3,800 kg) and carries 2,976 lb (1,350 kg) of ballast.

The boat has a draft of 4.10 ft (1.25 m) with the standard keel fitted.

The boat is fitted with a Swedish Volvo D1-13 diesel engine of 12 hp (9 kW) powering a saildrive transmission. The fuel tank holds 11 U.S. gallons (42 L; 9.2 imp gal) and the fresh water tank also has a capacity of 11 U.S. gallons (42 L; 9.2 imp gal). The holding tank has a 8 U.S. gallons (30 L; 6.7 imp gal) capacity.

The design has below deck sleeping accommodation for three people, with a double "V"-berth in the bow cabin and a straight settee in the main cabin. A galley is optional. The head is located just forward of the companionway steps on the port side. The interior is trimmed with matt varnished mahogany, while the headliner is made from synthetic alcantara. Lighting is provided by LEDs.

For single-handed sailing the design is equipped with jib winches that can be reached from the helm station. The mainsail halyard winch is located on the coachhouse roof and the jib is roller furling. The cockpit can accommodate six people.

Optional equipment includes electric jib winches, a powered mainsheet winch and an electric halyard winch.

== See also ==
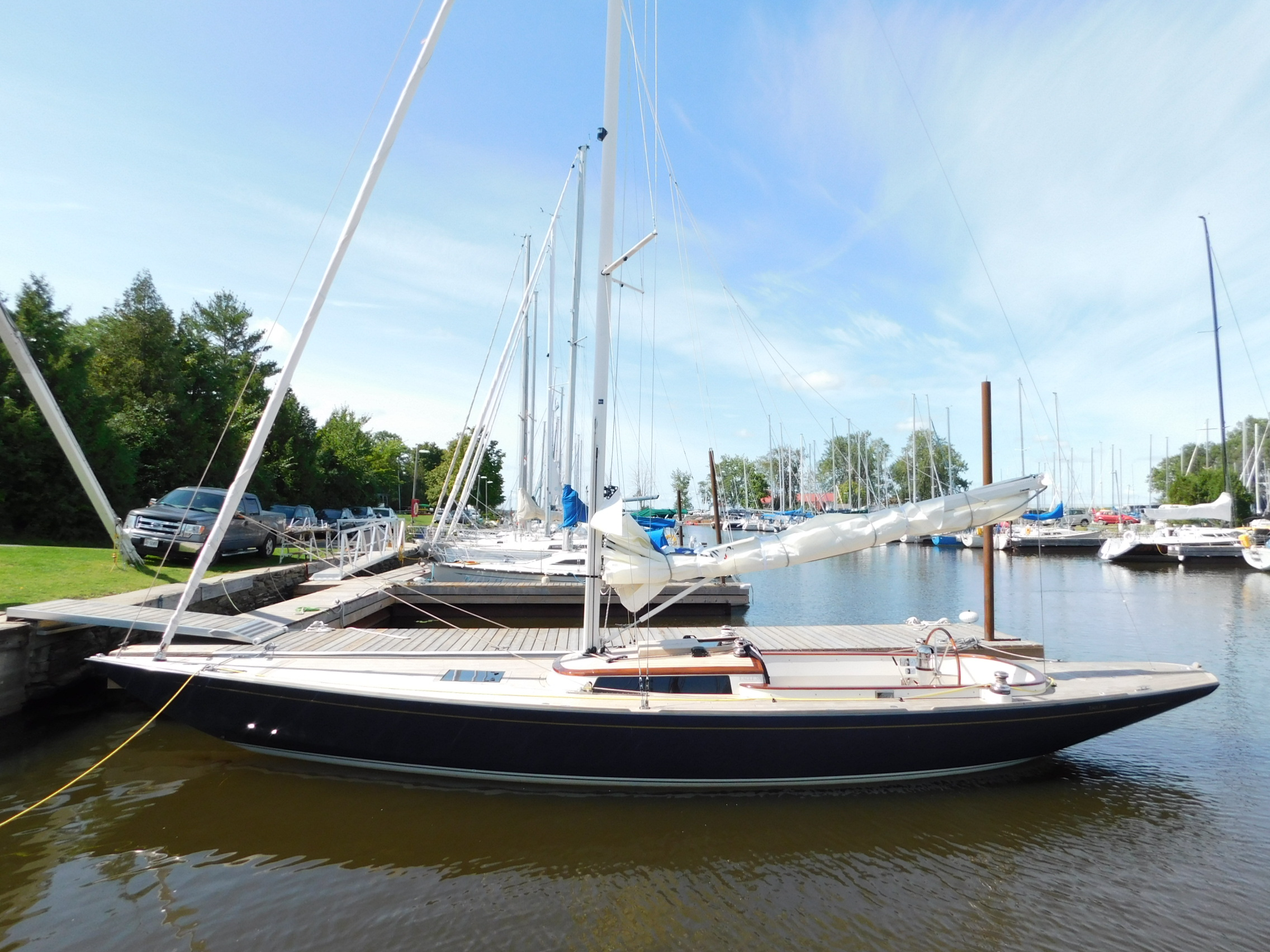
Eagle 38

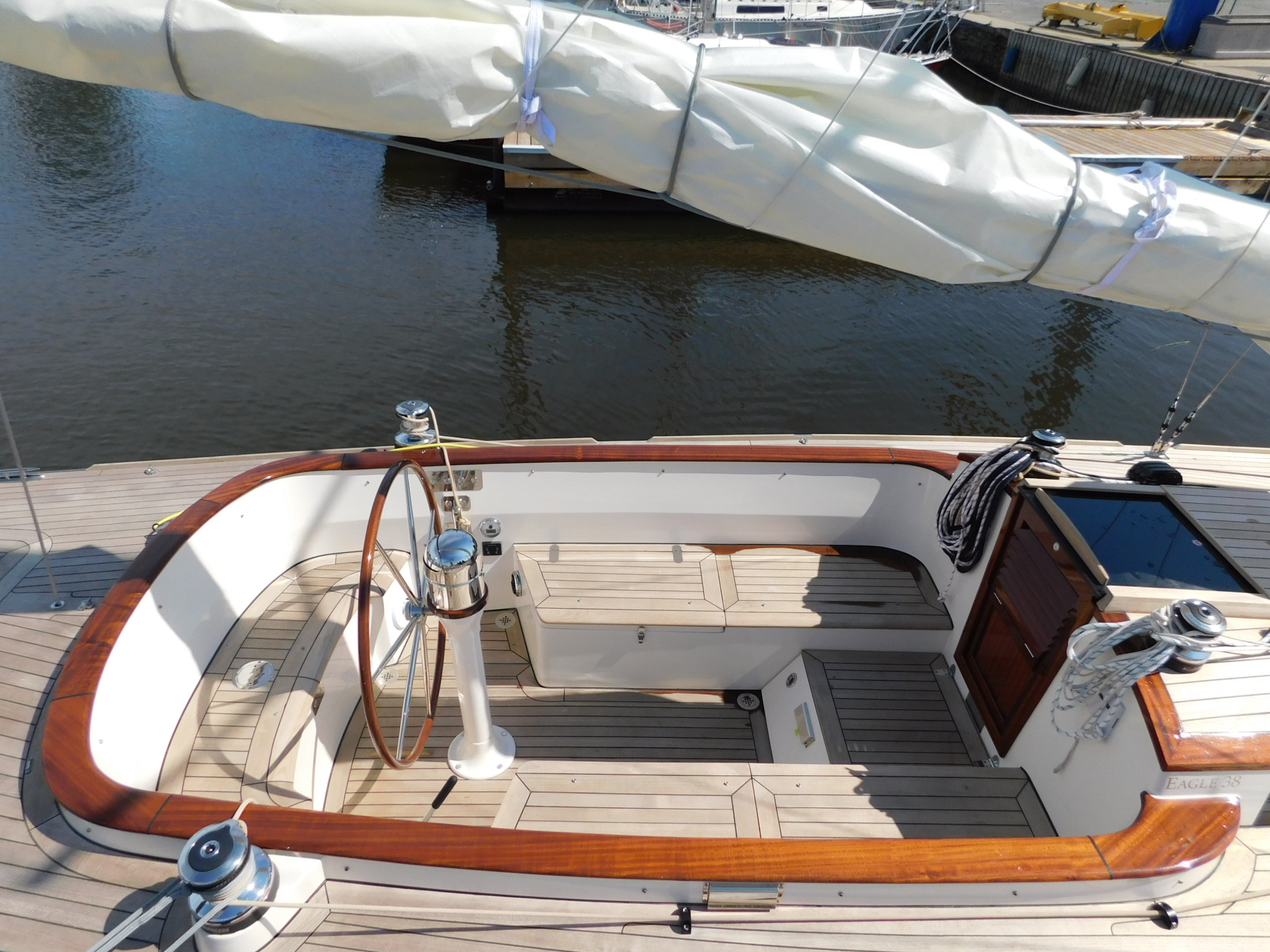
Eagle 38 cockpit

- List of sailing boat types

Similar sailboats

- Alajuela 38
- C&C 38
- Catalina 38
- Catalina 375
- Farr 38
- Hunter 38
- Hunter 376
- Hunter 380
- Landfall 38
- Sabre 38
- Shannon 38
- Stuart Knockabout
- Yankee 38
