= C&C 43-1 =

Sailboat class

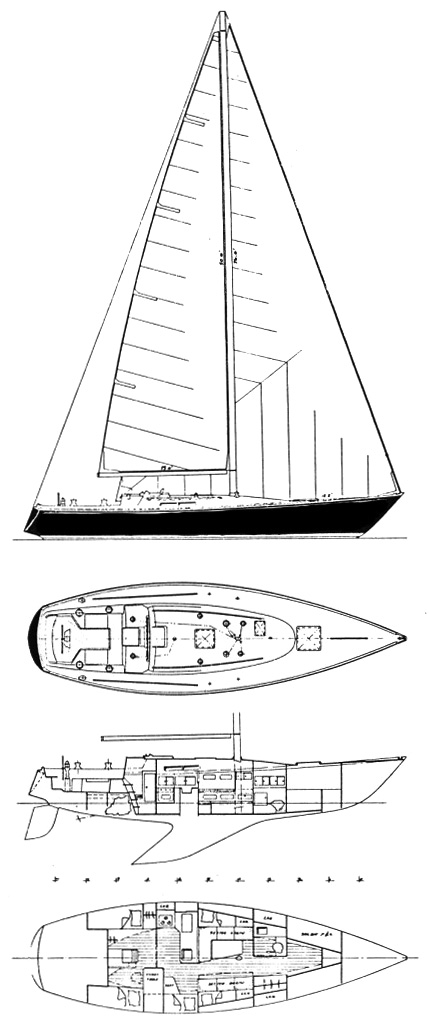

Development
- Designer: Cuthbertson & Cassian
- Location: Canada
- Year: 1971
- No. built: 15
- Builder: C&C Yachts
- Name: C&C 43-1

Boat
- Displacement: 21,314 lb (9,668 kg)
- Draft: 7.00 ft (2.13 m)

Hull
- Type: Monohull
- Construction: Fibreglass
- LOA: 43.33 ft (13.21 m)
- LWL: 35.00 ft (10.67 m)
- Beam: 12.83 ft (3.91 m)
- Engine: Inboard motor

Hull appendages
- Keel: swept fin keel
- Ballast: 9,980 lb (4,527 kg)
- Rudder: internally-mounted spade-type rudder

Rig
- Rig type: Bermuda rig
- I foretriangle height: 56.00 ft (17.07 m)
- J foretriangle base: 18.80 ft (5.73 m)
- P mainsail luff: 50.00 ft (15.24 m)
- E mainsail foot: 15.00 ft (4.57 m)

Sails
- Sailplan: Masthead sloop
- Mainsail area: 375.00 sq ft (34.839 m^{2})
- Jib/genoa area: 526.40 sq ft (48.904 m^{2})
- Total sail area: 901.40 sq ft (83.743 m^{2})

The C&C 43-1 is a Canadian sailboat, that was designed by Cuthbertson & Cassian (C&C Design) and first built in 1971.

The design was originally marketed as the C&C 43, but is now usually referred to as the 43-1 to differentiate it from the unrelated 1980 C&C 43-2.

== Production ==
The design was built by C&C Yachts in Canada who completed 15 examples, starting in 1971, but it is now out of production. The boats were built by C&C's Bruckmann Yachts division, which constructed the custom and semi-custom C&C boats.

== Design ==
The C&C 43-1 is a small recreational keelboat, built predominantly of fibreglass, with wood trim. It has a masthead sloop rig, a raked stem, a raised reverse transom, an internally-mounted spade-type rudder controlled by a wheel and a fixed swept fin keel. It displaces 21,314 lb (9,668 kg) and carries 9,980 lb (4,527 kg) of lead ballast.

The boat has a draft of 7.00 ft (2.13 m) with the standard keel installed. The boat is fitted with an inboard engine for docking and maneuvering.

A 2.00 ft (0.61 m) taller mast was a factory option. This also increased total sail area by about 2%.

The Tall mast version has a PHRF racing average handicap of 78 with a high of 89 and low of 66. Both the standard and tall mast versions have hull speeds of 8.02 kn (14.85 km/h).

== See also ==
- List of sailing boat types

Related development

- C&C 43-2

Similar sailboats

- Hunter 43 Legend
- Hunter 420
- Hunter 426
- Hunter 430
