= Traveller (nautical fitting) =

Sliding part of a sailing vessel

A traveller is a part of the rigging of a boat or ship that provides a moving attachment point for a rope, sail or yard to a fixed part of the vessel. It may take the form of anything from a simple ring on a metal bar or a spar to, especially in a modern yacht, a more complex "car" – a component with bearing-mounted wheels running on a shaped aluminium extrusion.

There are three common examples of the use of a traveller. The sheet of a sail is attached to a traveller on the horse, allowing the sail's clew to be positioned to leeward on each tack, thereby giving a more aerodynamically efficient position of the sail. A jib may be attached to a bowsprit with a traveller. This allows the sail to be set and handed without having to go out onto the bowsprit. Lastly, the yard of a lugsail is usually attached to the mast using a traveller. This often consists of a metal ring around the mast with a hook above and below the ring for, respectively, the halyard and the yard to fasten.

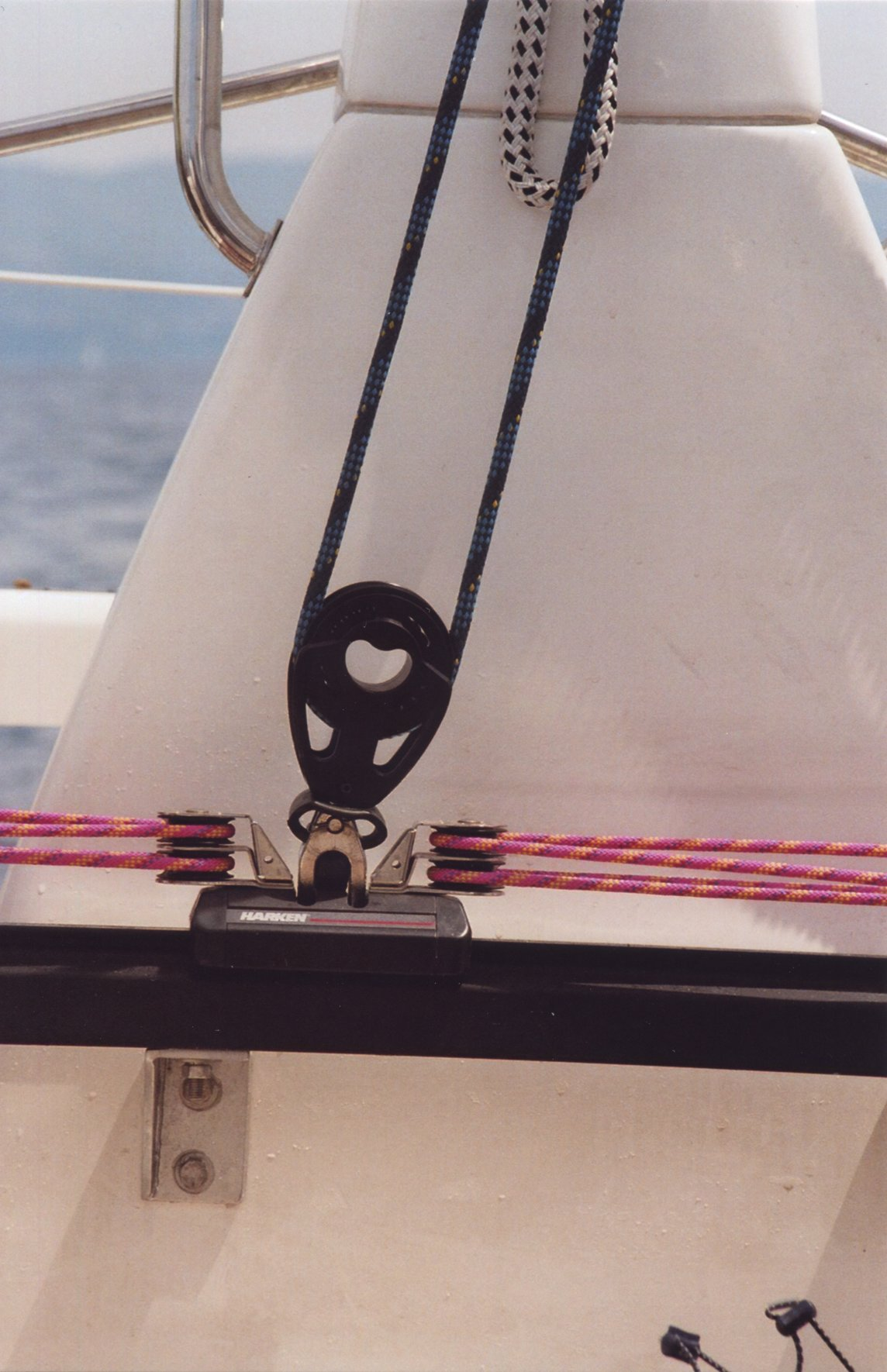
Traveller of a Bavaria 42 Match. The rose line is used to move the block horizontally by means of a pulley, the blue main sheet leads to the boom.

A traveller is used to modify the location at which lines used to control sails (such as sheets) are attached to the vessel. The attachment is often by means of a block through which the line runs; the block can move along the traveller. This allows independent control of the direction and tension of the line running through the block, which allows the sailor to position the block in the optimal location for the wind conditions and desired sail trim. This kind of traveller is often a metal track, which is attached to the deck of the boat. The block is attached to a "car", which much like a miniature railroad car, attaches to the track and slides along it in either direction. A traveller on a smaller craft (such as the popular single-handed "Laser" sailboat) might simply be a line attached to two points on the deck, along which another block runs. The term traveller can also be applied to the specialized lines used to control the location of the block.

The block used to support a load on a jackstay is referred to as a traveller or traveller block. It works in much the same way as a sheet traveller, in that it supports the load to be transported along the jackstay and is slid along the jackstay by control lines attached to both sides.
