= List of classes of Beneteau keelboats and yachts =

The following is a partial list of Beneteau keelboats, sailboats and yacht types and sailing classes

== Keelboats and yachts ==
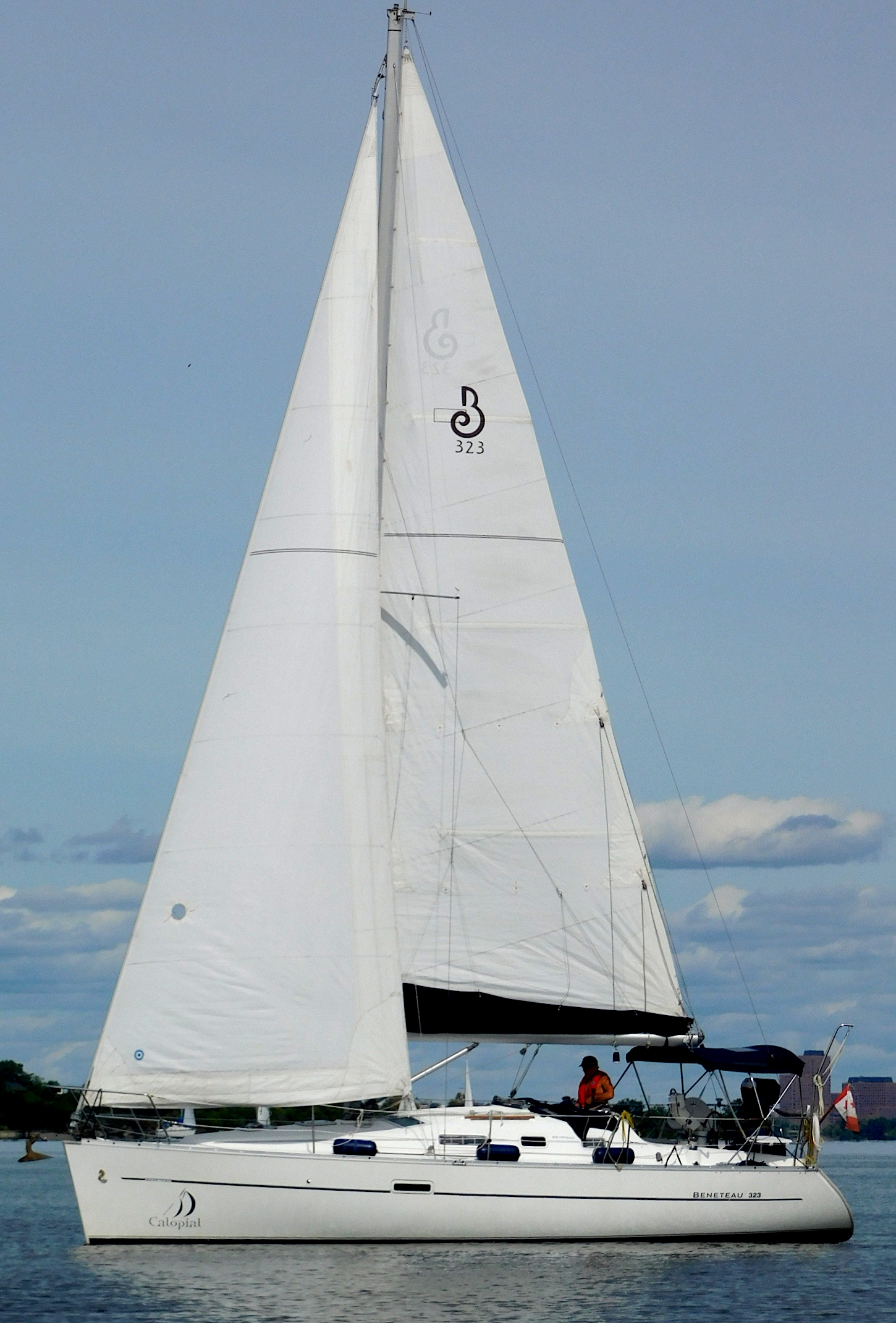
Beneteau 323

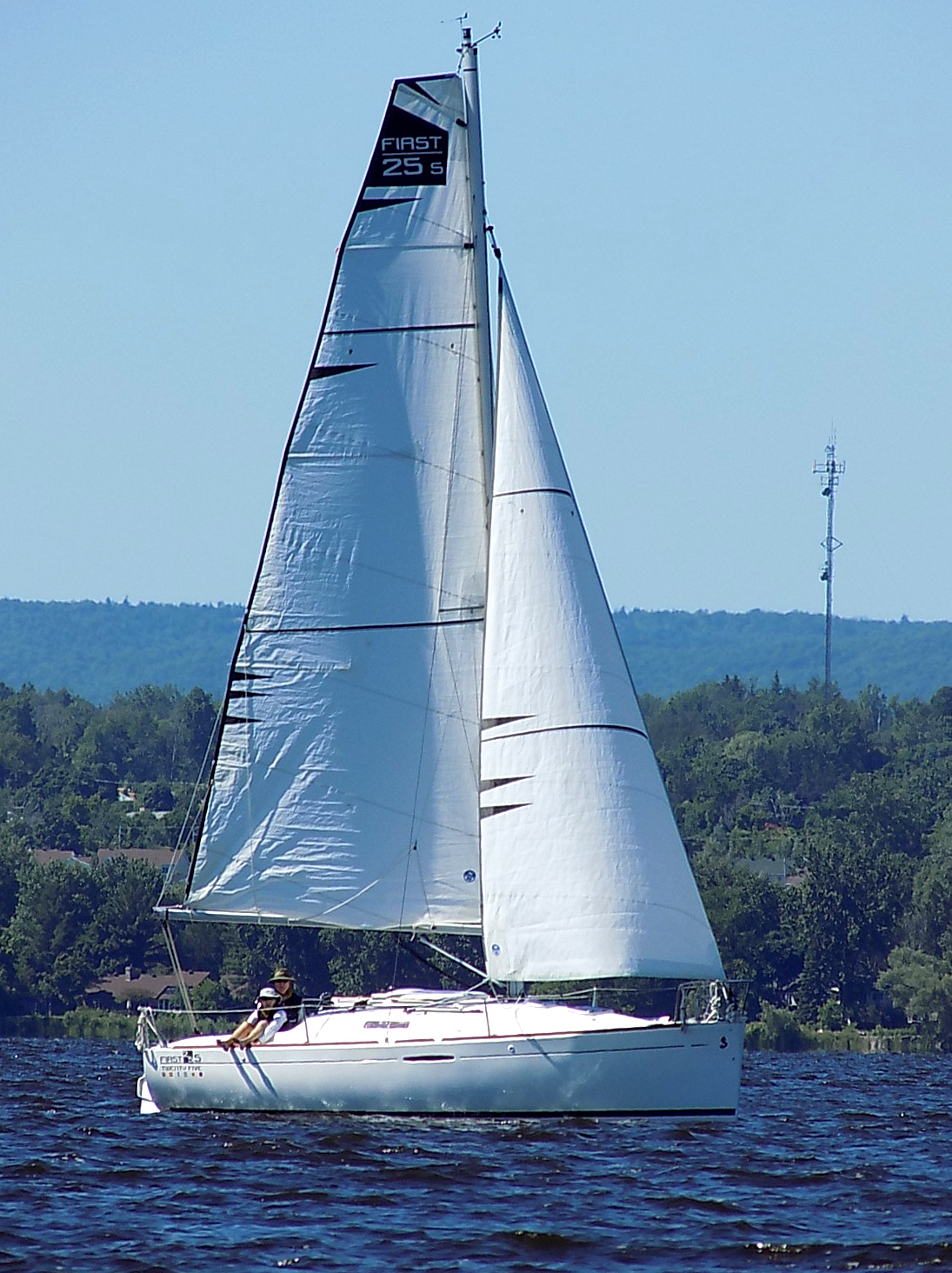
Beneteau First 25S

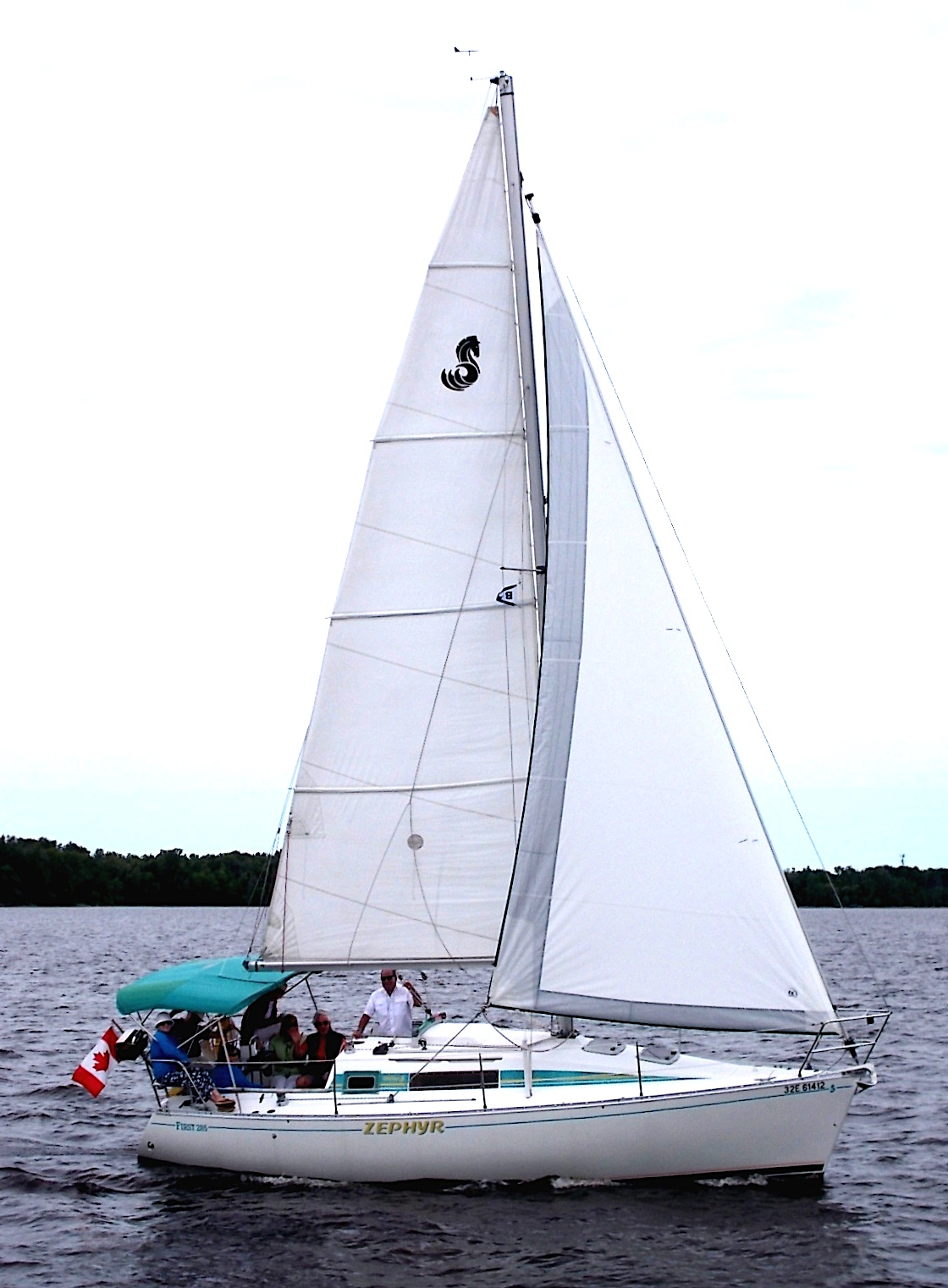
Beneteau First 285

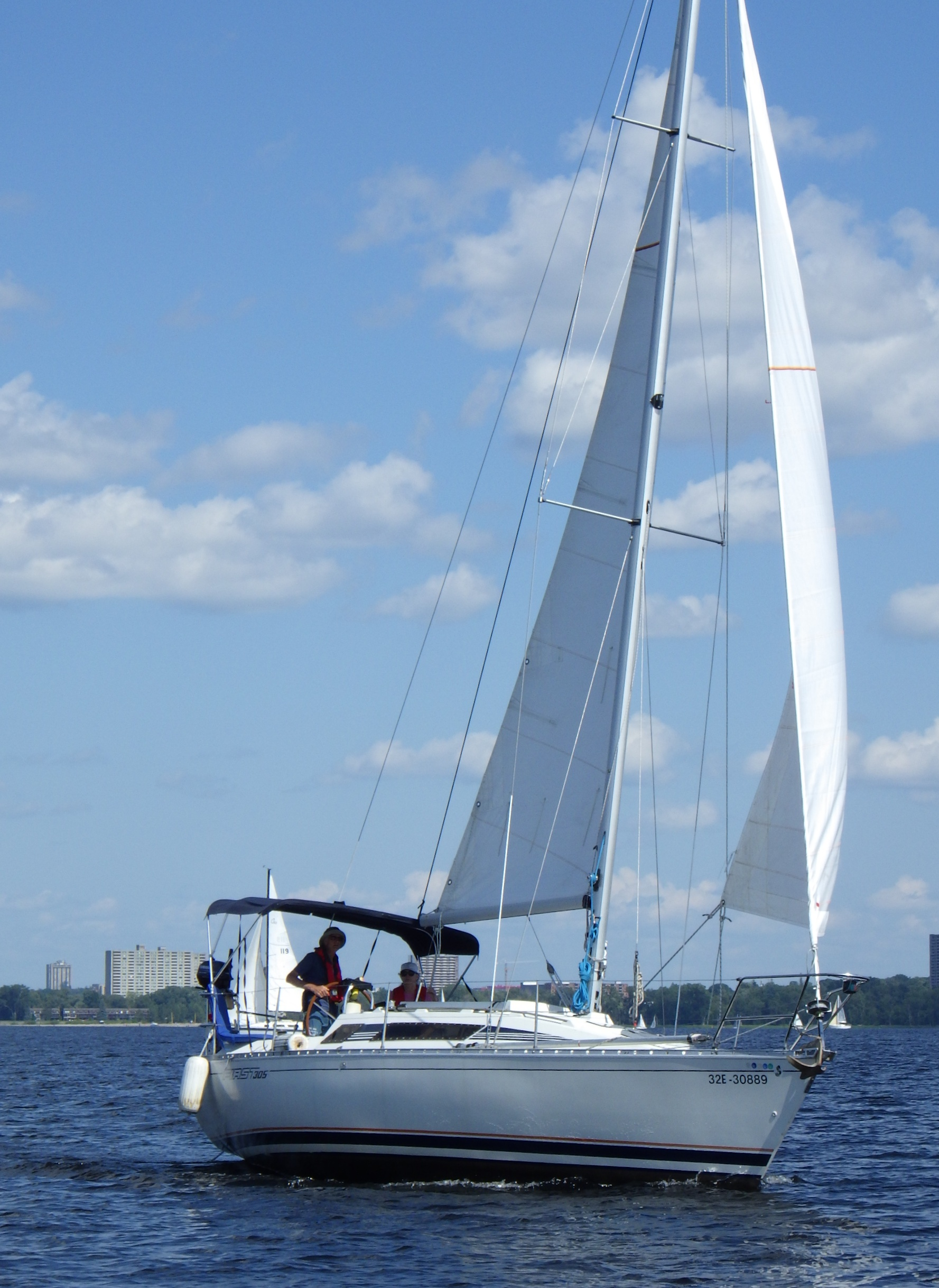
Beneteau First 305

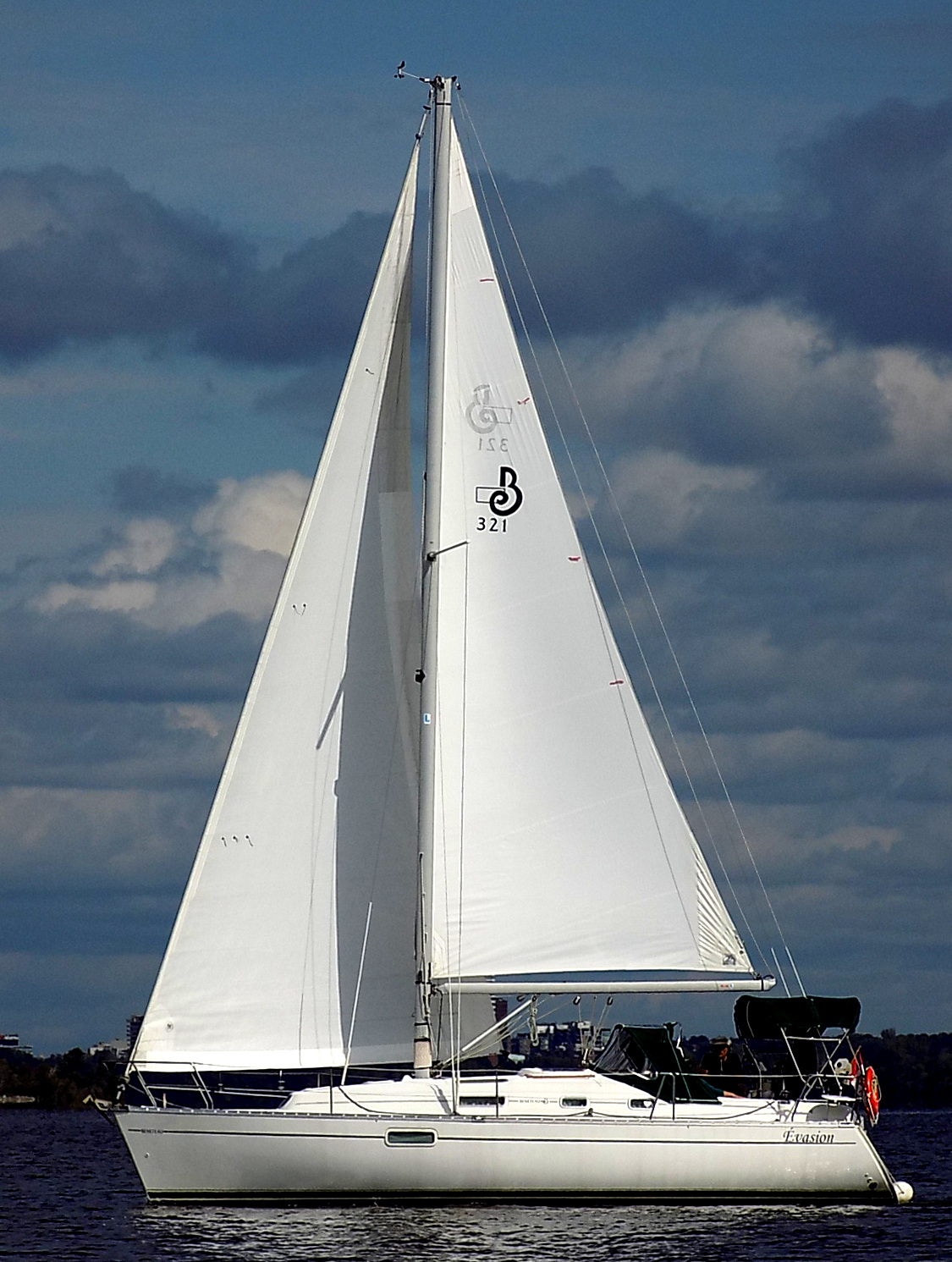
Beneteau Oceanis 321

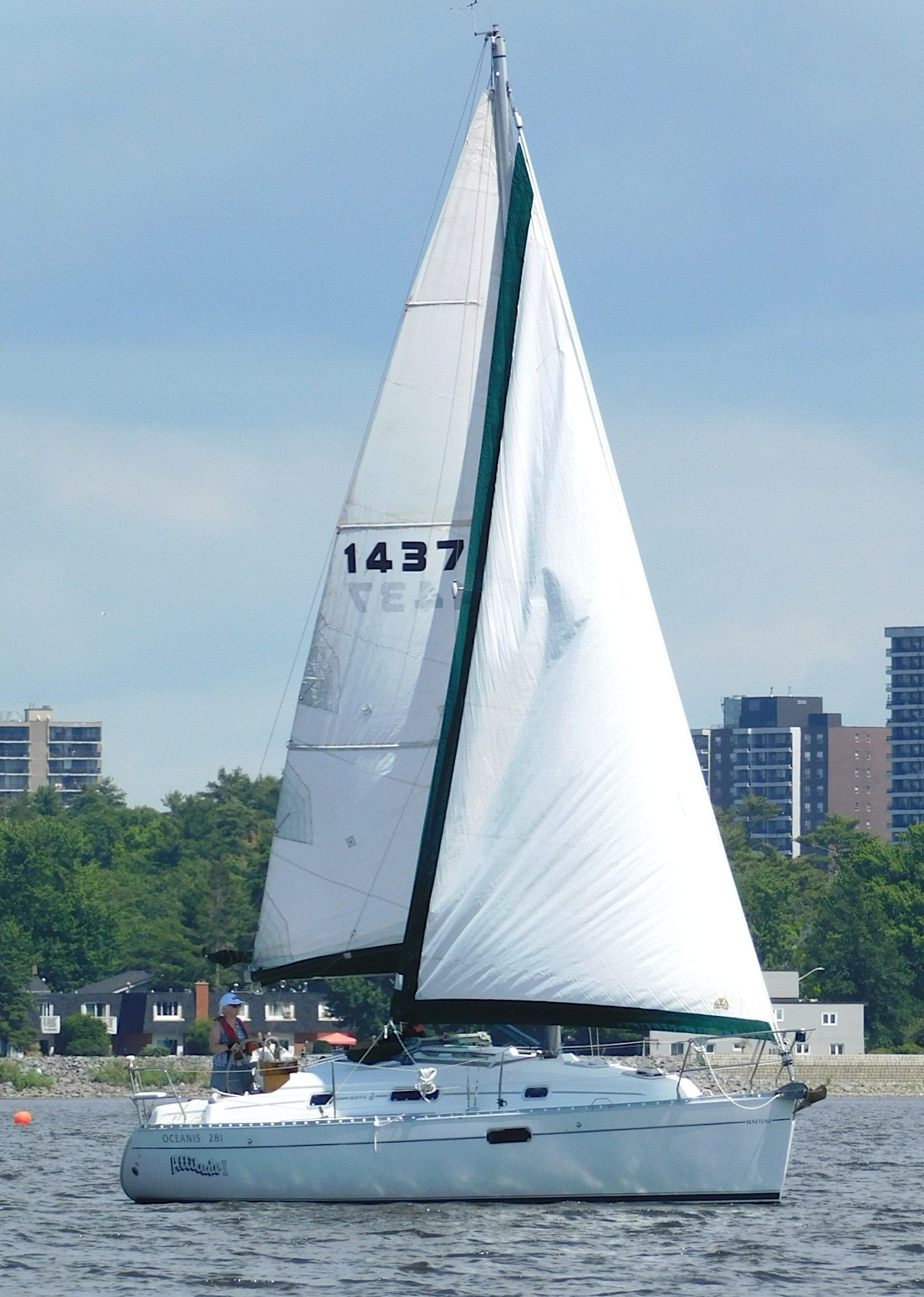
Beneteau Oceanis 281

Name	Year of first construction	Designer	Builder	Ref
Beneteau 1 Ton	1983	Group Finot; Jean Berret; Jacques Fauroux	Beneteau	
Beneteau 31	2002	Group Finot	Beneteau	
Beneteau 34	2008	Group Finot	Beneteau	
Beneteau 34.7	2005	Bruce Farr	Beneteau	
Beneteau 37	2006	Finot/Conq	Beneteau	
Beneteau 40	2007	Berret-Racoupeau	Beneteau	
Beneteau 42 CC	2003	Group Finot	Beneteau	
Beneteau 43	2006	Berret-Racoupeau; Nauta Design	Beneteau	
Beneteau 44 CC	1993	Bruce Farr; Armel Briand	Beneteau	
Beneteau 46	2005	Berret-Racoupeau; Nauta Design	Beneteau	
Beneteau 49	2007	Berret-Racoupeau; Nauta Design	Beneteau	
Beneteau 50	1995	Bruce Farr; Armel Briand	Beneteau	
Beneteau 57	2002	Bruce Farr; Franck Darnet	Beneteau	
Beneteau 62	1995	Bruce Farr	Beneteau	
Beneteau 311	1997	Group Finot	Beneteau	
Beneteau 323	2001	Group Finot	Beneteau	
Beneteau 331	1999	Group Finot	Beneteau	
Beneteau 343	2004	Berret-Racoupeau	Beneteau	
Beneteau 361	1999	Berret-Racoupeau	Beneteau	
Beneteau 373	2004	Berret-Racoupeau	Beneteau	
Beneteau 393	2002	Berret-Racoupeau	Beneteau	
Beneteau 423	2002	Group Finot	Beneteau	
Beneteau 461	1996	Bruce Farr; Armel Briand	Beneteau	
Beneteau 473	2000	Group Finot	Beneteau	
Beneteau 523	2001	Group Finot	Beneteau	
Beneteau Baroudeur	1970	André Bénéteau	Beneteau	
Beneteau Blue II	1985	Philippe Briand	Beneteau	
Beneteau Cabochard	1974	André Bénéteau	Beneteau	
Beneteau California 4.70	1983	André Bénéteau	Beneteau	
Beneteau California 5.20	1982	André Bénéteau	Beneteau	
Beneteau California 5.50	1981	André Bénéteau	Beneteau	
Beneteau California 6.60	1982	André Bénéteau	Beneteau	
Beneteau Capelan	1972	André Bénéteau	Beneteau	
Beneteau Cyclades 39.3	2007	Berret-Racoupeau	Beneteau	
Beneteau Cyclades 43.3	2007	Berret-Racoupeau	Beneteau	
Beneteau Cyclades 50.5	2008	Berret-Racoupeau	Beneteau	
Beneteau Cyclades 51.5	2005	Berret-Racoupeau	Beneteau	
Beneteau Escapade	1976	André Bénéteau	Beneteau	
Beneteau Evasion 22	1980	André Bénéteau	Beneteau	
Beneteau Evasion 25	1977	André Bénéteau	Beneteau	
Beneteau Evasion 28	1975	André Bénéteau	Beneteau	
Beneteau Evasion 29	1980	André Bénéteau	Beneteau	
Beneteau Evasion 32	1973	André Bénéteau	Beneteau	
Beneteau Evasion 34	1980	André Bénéteau	Beneteau	
Beneteau Evasion 36	1990	Philippe Briand	Beneteau	
Beneteau Evasion 37	1980	Philippe Briand	Beneteau	
Beneteau Figaro	1990	Jean Berret; Groupe Finot	Beneteau	
Beneteau Figaro 2	2003	Marc Lombard	Beneteau	
Beneteau Figaro 3	2018	Van Peteghem/Lauriot-Prevost	Beneteau	
Beneteau First 14	2017	Samuel Manuard	Beneteau	
Beneteau First 18	1978	Groupe Finot	Beneteau	
Beneteau First 18 SE	2008	Samuel Manuard	Beneteau	
Beneteau First 20	2011	Finot/Conq	Beneteau	
Beneteau First 25.7	2004	Group Finot	Beneteau	
Beneteau First 25S	2008	Group Finot/Conq	Beneteau	
Beneteau First 26	1984	Group Finot	Beneteau	
Beneteau First 42	1981	Germán Frers	Beneteau	
Beneteau First 210	1992	Group Finot	Beneteau	
Beneteau First 235	1986	Group Finot	Beneteau	
Beneteau First 260 Spirit	1994	Group Finot	Beneteau	
Beneteau First 265	1990	Group Finot	Beneteau	
Beneteau First 285	1985	Group Finot	Beneteau	
Beneteau First 305	1984	Jean Berret	Beneteau	
Beneteau First Class 10	1982	Group Finot/Jacques Fauroux	Beneteau	
Beneteau Oceanis 35.1	2017	Group Finot/Conq	Beneteau	
Beneteau Oceanis 281	1995	Group Finot	Beneteau	
Beneteau Oceanis 321	1995	Group Finot	Beneteau	
Farr 30/Mumm 30	1995	Bruce Farr	Beneteau; Carroll Marine dk Yachts; McDell Marine; Ovington Boats; Waterline Systems	
Moorings 51.5	2005	Berret-Racoupeau	Beneteau	

== See also ==
- Classic dinghy classes
- List of boat types
- List of historical ship types
- List of keelboat classes designed before 1970
- Olympic sailing classes
- Small-craft sailing
