= Baroudeur =

Baroudeur (French: "fighter" or "adventurer") may refer to:

- Baroudeur, a French cycling term for a breakaway specialist
- Baroudeurs de Pia XIII, a French rugby league team
- Beneteau Baroudeur, a French sailboat design
- Les Baroudeurs, the French language title of the 1970 film You Can't Win 'Em All
- SNCASE Baroudeur, a French fighter jet
