= Beneteau Blue II =

Sailboat class

Development
- Designer: Philippe Briand
- Location: France
- Year: 1985
- Builder: Beneteau
- Role: Cruiser
- Name: Beneteau Blue II

Boat
- Displacement: 7,275 lb (3,300 kg)
- Draft: 2.95 ft (0.90 m)

Hull
- Type: multihull
- Construction: glassfibre
- LOA: 34.12 ft (10.40 m)
- LWL: 29.20 ft (8.90 m)
- Beam: 19.65 ft (5.99 m)
- Engine: Two 24 hp (18 kW) diesel engines

Hull appendages
- Keel: Twin keels
- Rudder: Two spade-type rudders

Rig
- Rig type: Bermuda rig

Sails
- Sailplan: Fractional rigged sloop
- Total sail area: 699.00 sq ft (64.939 m^{2})

The Beneteau Blue II is a French catamaran sailboat that was designed by Philippe Briand as a cruiser and first built in 1985.

The design was developed into the larger 40.50 ft (12.34 m) Beneteau Blue 41 in 1987, but it is not known if it entered production or not.

== Production ==
The design was built by Beneteau in France, starting in 1985, but it is now out of production.

== Design ==
The Blue II is a recreational sailboat, built predominantly of glassfibre, with wood trim. It has a fractional sloop rig, with a keel-stepped mast, one set of unswept spreaders and aluminium spars with stainless steel wire standing rigging. The hulls have plumb stems, reverse transoms with steps to swimming platforms, twin internally mounted spade-type rudders controlled by a wheel and a twin fixed fin keels.

The boat displaces 7,275 lb (3,300 kg) and has a draft of 2.95 ft (0.90 m) with the standard keels.

The boat is fitted with twin 24 hp (18 kW) diesel engines for docking and manoeuvring. The fuel tank holds 14 U.S. gallons (53 L; 12 imp gal) and the fresh water tank has a capacity of 30 U.S. gallons (110 L; 25 imp gal).

The design has sleeping accommodation for four people, with a double berth in a cabin in each hull. It also has a U-shaped settee in the main salon. The galley is located aft in the starboard hull. The galley is L-shaped and is equipped with a stove and a sink. The head is located in the port hull.

The design has a hull speed of 7.24 kn (13.41 km/h).

== See also ==
- List of sailing boat types
