= Beneteau Cyclades 50.5 =

Sailboat class

Development
- Designer: Berret-Racoupeau
- Location: France
- Year: 2008
- Builder: Beneteau
- Role: Cruiser
- Name: Beneteau Cyclades 50.5

Boat
- Displacement: 27,954 lb (12,680 kg)
- Draft: 6.56 ft (2.00 m)

Hull
- Type: monohull
- Construction: glassfibre
- LOA: 51.34 ft (15.65 m)
- LWL: 43.24 ft (13.18 m)
- Beam: 16.08 ft (4.90 m)
- Engine: Yanmar 110 hp (82 kW) diesel engine

Hull appendages
- Keel: Fin keel
- Ballast: 8,708 lb (3,950 kg)
- Rudder: Spade-type rudder

Rig
- Rig type: Bermuda rig
- I foretriangle height: 59.87 ft (18.25 m)
- J foretriangle base: 17.88 ft (5.45 m)
- P mainsail luff: 54.92 ft (16.74 m)
- E mainsail foot: 19.36 ft (5.90 m)

Sails
- Sailplan: Masthead sloop
- Mainsail area: 531.63 sq ft (49.390 m^{2})
- Jib/genoa area: 535.24 sq ft (49.725 m^{2})
- Total sail area: 1,066.87 sq ft (99.115 m^{2})

The Beneteau Cyclades 50.5 and Cyclades 50.4 are a series of French sailboats that was designed by Berret-Racoupeau as cruisers, primarily aimed at the yacht charter market and first built in 2008. The series is named for the Greek island chain.

The 50.5 and 50.4 are externally identical and differ only in their interior layouts.

== Production ==
The design was built by Beneteau in France, from 2008 to 2010, but it is now out of production.

== Design ==
The Cyclades 50.5 is a recreational keelboat, built predominantly of glassfibre, with wood trim. It has a masthead sloop rig, with aluminium spars with stainless steel wire standing rigging. The hull has a slightly raked stem, a walk-through reverse transom with a swimming platform, an internally mounted spade-type rudder controlled by dual wheels and a fixed fin keel with a weighted bulb. It displaces 27,954 lb (12,680 kg) and carries 8,708 lb (3,950 kg) of cast iron ballast.

The boat has a draft of 6.56 ft (2.00 m) with the standard keel.

The boat is fitted with a Japanese Yanmar diesel engine of 110 hp (82 kW) for docking and manoeuvring. The fuel tank holds 106 U.S. gallons (400 L; 88 imp gal) and the fresh water tank has a capacity of 259 U.S. gallons (980 L; 216 imp gal).

The Cyclades 50.5 has sleeping accommodation for ten people in five cabins, with two bow cabins and two aft cabins, each with a double berth, plus a port side admidships crew cabin with two bunk beds. The main salon has a U-shaped settee and a straight settee. The straight configuration galley is located on the port side of the salon and is equipped with a four-burner stove, a refrigerator, freezer and a double sink. A navigation station is opposite the galley, on the starboard side. There are three heads, two for the bow cabins and one aft to starboard. Cyclades 50.4 differs in having a fourth head aft to port, in place of the crew cabin.

The design has a hull speed of 8.81 kn (16.32 km/h).

== Operational history ==
A review for yacht charter company Sailing Europe, noted, the "Beneteau Cyclades 50.5 most commonly comes as a version with 3 showers and toilets along with a deck shower. Since this yacht is 15.6 m long overall and is 4.89 m wide it is not made for high sailing performances and top speeds for competitive sailing. This yacht is designed to accommodate a lot of people and to provide them as much comfort and space as possible."

== See also ==
- List of sailing boat types
