= Beneteau California 5.20 =

Sailboat class

Development
- Designer: André Bénéteau
- Location: France
- Year: 1983
- Builder: Beneteau
- Role: Fishing boat, day sailer, cruiser

Boat
- Draft: 2.13 ft (0.65 m)

Hull
- Type: monohull
- Construction: glassfibre
- LOA: 18.04 ft (5.50 m)
- LWL: 14.44 ft (4.40 m)
- Beam: 7.55 ft (2.30 m)
- Engine: 15 hp (11 kW) diesel engine/9.9 hp (7 kW) outboard motor

Hull appendages
- Keel: Long keel
- Rudder: Transom-mounted rudder

Rig
- Rig type: Bermuda rig

Sails
- Sailplan: Fractional rigged sloop Masthead sloop
- Total sail area: 150.69 sq ft (14.000 m^{2})

The Beneteau California 5.20 is a French trailerable sailboat that was designed by André Bénéteau as a fishing boat, day sailer and a pocket cruiser and first built in 1982.

== Production ==
The design was built by Beneteau in France, from 1982 to 1988, but it is now out of production.

== Design ==
The California 5.20 is a recreational keelboat, built predominantly of glassfibre, with wood trim. It has a fractional sloop masthead sloop rig, with a deck-stepped mast and aluminium spars with stainless steel wire standing rigging. The hull has a raked stem, a vertical transom, a transom-hung rudder controlled by a tiller and a fixed long keel or optional shoal draft keel. The company marketed it saying, "new yachting enthusiasts will discover a simple and economical boat that is suitable for all sailing programmes."

The boat has a draft of 2.13 ft (0.65 m) with the standard keel and 1.31 ft (0.40 m) with the optional shoal draft keel.

The boat is normally fitted with a small outboard motor with a maximum power output of 9.9 hp (7 kW) for docking and maneuvering. A 15 hp (11 kW) inboard diesel engine was a factory option.

The design has sleeping accommodation for two people, with a double "V"-berth in the cabin. It has a hull speed of 5.09 kn (9.43 km/h).

== See also ==
- List of sailing boat types
