= Beneteau First Class 8 =

First Class 8
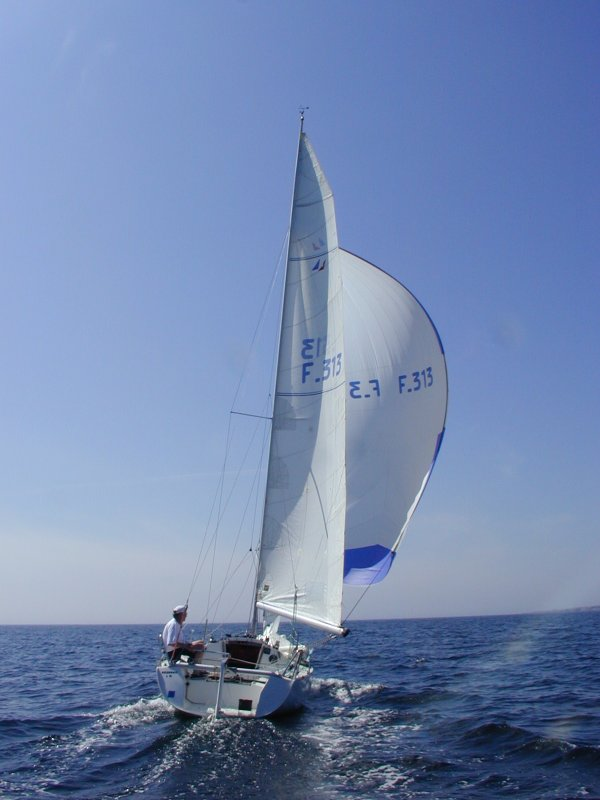

Development
- Name: First Class 8

Boat
- Crew: 4–6
- Draft: 0.70 m (2.3 ft) / 1.75 m (5.7 ft)

Hull
- Hull weight: 1,400 kg
- LOA: 8.5 m (28 ft)
- LWL: 7.1 m (23 ft)
- Beam: 2.49 m (8.2 ft)

Sails
- Mainsail area: 20.30 m^{2}
- Jib/genoa area: 18.50 m^{2}
- Spinnaker area: 49 m^{2}

The First Class 8 (FC8) is a One-Design keelboat designed in 1982 by Group Finot and Jacques Fouroux to be constructed at Beneteau's shipyard.

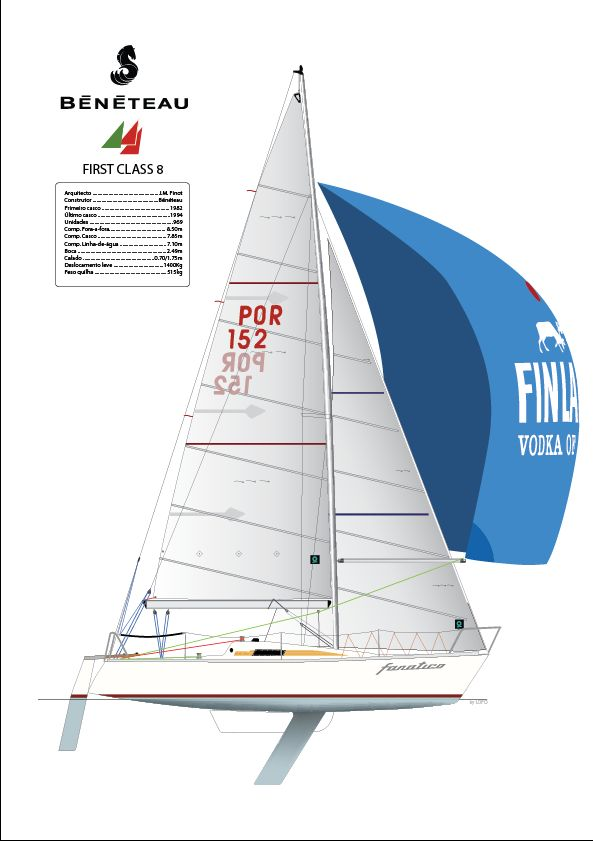
Beneteau First Class 8

It is one of Europe's most competitive sailing classes, with more than 1,000 units sold between 1982 and 1994.

Strongest fleets are located in France, Belgium, Spain, Italy, Germany, Norway and Portugal.

It is a long boat compared with its competitors such as the J/24 from America. It has straight lines for a boat of that age and has no reference to IOR hull shapes with huge beam, flared bows, and pinched sterns. The boat's lines lend themselves to a dinghy style planing hull, as opposed to digging a hole in the ocean which was a characteristic of the mid period IOR boats. The FC8 has a lot of wetted surface area which makes it slow in light air.
