= Beneteau California 4.70 =

Sailboat class

Beneteau California 470
Development
- Designer: André Bénéteau
- Location: France
- Year: 1983
- No. built: 150
- Builder: Beneteau
- Role: Fishing boat, day sailer, cruiser
- Name: Beneteau California 470

Boat
- Displacement: 882 lb (400 kg)
- Draft: 4.76 ft (1.45 m) with centreboard down

Hull
- Type: monohull
- Construction: glassfibre
- LOA: 15.42 ft (4.70 m)
- LWL: 12.66 ft (3.86 m)
- Beam: 6.96 ft (2.12 m)
- Engine: Yanmar 1GM inboard engine or outboard motor, maximum 9.8 hp (7 kW)

Hull appendages
- Keel: Long keel and centreboard
- Rudder: Transom-mounted rudder

Rig
- Rig type: Bermuda rig

Sails
- Sailplan: Fractional rigged sloop
- Total sail area: 129 sq ft (12.0 m^{2})

The Beneteau California 4.70 or 470, is a French trailerable sailboat that was designed by André Bénéteau as a fishing boat, day sailer and pocket cruiser, first built in 1983. The design is named for its length overall in metres.

== Production ==
The design was built by Beneteau in France, from 1983 until 1986, with 150 boats completed, but it is now out of production.

== Design ==
The California 470 is a recreational keelboat, built predominantly of glassfibre, with wood trim. It has a fractional sloop rig, with a deck-stepped mast and aluminium spars with stainless steel wire standing rigging. The hull has a spooned raked stem, an angled transom, a transom-hung rudder controlled by a tiller and a fixed long keel with a retractable centreboard. It displaces 882 lb (400 kg).

The boat has a draft of 4.76 ft (1.45 m) with the centreboard extended and 1.48 ft (0.45 m) with it retracted, allowing operation in shallow water or ground transportation on a trailer.

The boat is normally fitted with a small outboard motor up to 9.8 hp (7 kW) for docking and maneuvering. A Yanmar 1GM diesel inboard engine was also available as a factory option. In either case the engine is mounted in the lazarette.

The design has sleeping accommodation for two people, with a double "V"-berth in the bow cabin.

The design has a hull speed of 4.77 kn (8.83 km/h).

== See also ==
- List of sailing boat types
