= Beneteau California 5.50 =

French sailboat class

Development
- Designer: André Bénéteau
- Location: France
- Year: 1981
- No. built: 950
- Builder: Beneteau
- Role: Fishing boat, day sailer, cruiser
- Name: Beneteau California 5.50

Boat
- Displacement: 1,433 lb (650 kg)
- Draft: 1.31 ft (0.40 m)

Hull
- Type: monohull
- Construction: glassfibre
- LOA: 18.04 ft (5.50 m)
- LWL: 14.44 ft (4.40 m)
- Beam: 7.55 ft (2.30 m)
- Engine: outboard motor

Hull appendages
- Keel: Long keel
- Rudder: Transom-mounted rudder

Rig
- Rig type: Bermuda rig

Sails
- Sailplan: Fractional rigged sloop
- Total sail area: 150.00 sq ft (13.935 m^{2})

The Beneteau California 5.50, or 550, is a French trailerable sailboat that was designed by André Bénéteau as a fishing boat, day sailer and pocket cruiser. The design is named for its length overall in metres and was first built in 1981.

== Production ==
The design was built by Beneteau in France, from 1981 to 1988, with 950 boats completed, but it is now out of production.

== Design ==
The California 5.50 is a recreational keelboat, built predominantly of glassfibre, with wood trim. It has a fractional sloop rig, with a deck-stepped mast and aluminium spars with stainless steel wire standing rigging. The hull has a raked stem, an angled transom, a transom-hung rudder controlled by a tiller and a fixed long keel or optional twin keels. It displaces 1,433 lb (650 kg).

The boat has a draft of 1.31 ft (0.40 m) with the standard long keel and 1.64 ft (0.50 m) with the optional twin keel configuration.

The boat is normally fitted with a small 9.8 to 14.7 hp (7 to 11 kW) outboard motor for docking and maneuvering. It has sleeping accommodation for two people, with a double "V"-berth in the cabin.

The design has a hull speed of 5.09 kn (9.43 km/h).

== See also ==
- List of sailing boat types
