= Beneteau Capelan =

Sailboat class

Development
- Designer: André Bénéteau
- Location: France
- Year: 1972
- Builder: Beneteau
- Role: Fishing boat, day sailer, cruiser

Boat
- Displacement: 1,058 lb (480 kg)
- Draft: 1.97 ft (0.60 m)

Hull
- Type: monohull
- Construction: glassfibre
- LOA: 14.76 ft (4.50 m)
- Beam: 6.73 ft (2.05 m)
- Engine: outboard motor

Hull appendages
- Keel: Long keel
- Ballast: 330 lb (150 kg)
- Rudder: Transom-mounted rudder

Rig
- Rig type: Bermuda rig

Sails
- Sailplan: Masthead sloop
- Total sail area: 134.00 sq ft (12.449 m^{2})

The Beneteau Capelan is a French trailerable sailboat that was designed by André Bénéteau as a fishing boat, day sailer and pocket cruiser, and first built in 1972. The boat is named for the species of fish.

== Production ==
The design was built by Beneteau in France, from 1972 to 1979, but it is now out of production.

== Design ==
The Capelan is a recreational keelboat, built predominantly of glassfibre, with wood trim. It has a masthead sloop rig, with a deck-stepped mast, one set of swept spreaders and aluminium spars with stainless steel wire standing rigging. The hull has a spooned and slightly raked stem, an angled transom, a transom-hung rudder controlled by a tiller and a fixed long keel. It displaces 1,058 lb (480 kg) and carries 330 lb (150 kg) of ballast.

The boat has a draft of 1.97 ft (0.60 m) with the standard keel.

The boat is normally fitted with a small 4 to 15 hp (3 to 11 kW) outboard motor mounted in a stern well, for docking and maneuvering. An inboard motor of 5 to 7 hp (4 to 5 kW) was a factory option.

The design has sleeping accommodation for two people, with a double "V"-berth in the small cabin.

== See also ==
- List of sailing boat types
