= Beneteau First 265 =

Sailboat class

First 265
Development
- Designer: Group Finot
- Location: France
- Year: 1990
- Builder: Beneteau
- Name: First 265

Boat
- Displacement: 4,800 lb (2,177 kg)
- Draft: 4.92 ft (1.50 m)

Hull
- Type: Monohull
- Construction: Fiberglass
- LOA: 26.00 ft (7.92 m)
- LWL: 24.17 ft (7.37 m)
- Beam: 9.42 ft (2.87 m)
- Engine: Inboard motor

Hull appendages
- Keel: fin keel
- Ballast: 1,430 lb (649 kg)
- Rudder: internally-mounted spade-type rudder

Rig
- Rig type: Bermuda rig
- I foretriangle height: 31.33 ft (9.55 m)
- J foretriangle base: 10.07 ft (3.07 m)
- P mainsail luff: 30.51 ft (9.30 m)
- E mainsail foot: 10.82 ft (3.30 m)

Sails
- Sailplan: Fractional rigged sloop
- Mainsail area: 165.06 sq ft (15.335 m^{2})
- Jib/genoa area: 157.75 sq ft (14.655 m^{2})
- Total sail area: 322.81 sq ft (29.990 m^{2})

The Beneteau First 265 is a French sailboat, that was designed by Group Finot and first built in 1990.

The Beneteau First 265 design was developed into the Beneteau Oceanis 281 in 1995.

== Production ==
The design was built by Beneteau in France and in the United States. The company built 520 examples between 1990 and 1997, but it is now out of production.

== Design ==
The First 265 is a small recreational keelboat, built predominantly of fiberglass. It has a fractional sloop rig, a slightly raked stem, a reverse transom, an internally-mounted spade-type rudder controlled by a tiller and a fixed fin keel. It displaces 4,800 lb (2,177 kg) and carries 1,430 lb (649 kg) of ballast.

The boat has a draft of 4.92 ft (1.50 m) with the standard keel and 3.77 ft (1.15 m) with the optional shoal draft keel.

The boat is fitted with an inboard motor. The fuel tank holds 7 U.S. gallons (26 L; 5.8 imp gal) and the fresh water tank has a capacity of 10 U.S. gallons (38 L; 8.3 imp gal).

The design has a hull speed of 6.59 kn (12.20 km/h).

== See also ==
- List of sailing boat types
