= Beneteau First 26 =

Sailboat class

First 26 fin keel
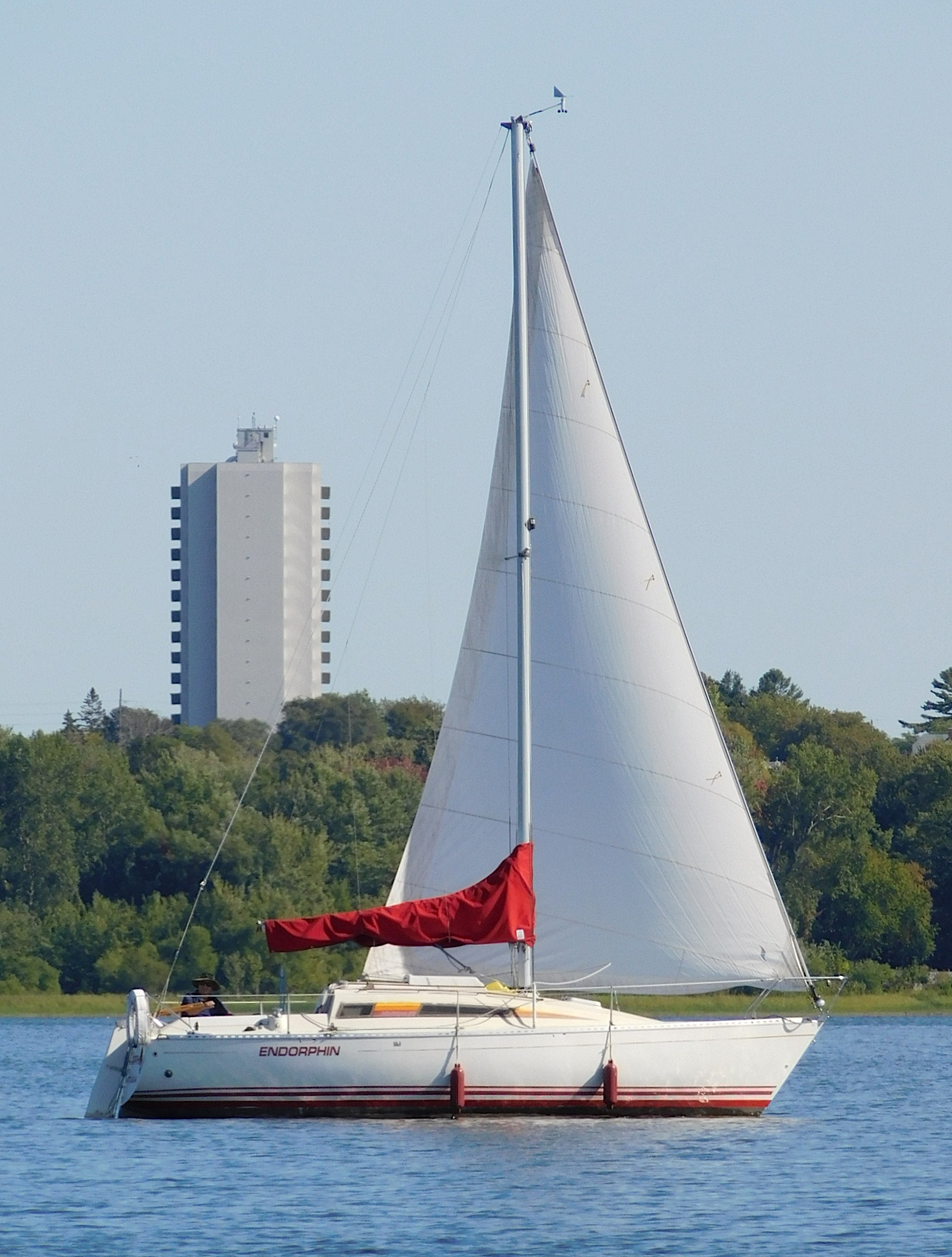

Development
- Designer: Groupe Finot
- Location: France
- Year: 1984
- No. built: about 300
- Builder: Beneteau
- Role: Cruiser-Racer
- Name: First 26 fin keel

Boat
- Displacement: 4,814 lb (2,184 kg)
- Draft: 4.30 ft (1.31 m)

Hull
- Type: Monohull
- Construction: Fiberglass
- LOA: 26.30 ft (8.02 m)
- LWL: 22.90 ft (6.98 m)
- Beam: 9.20 ft (2.80 m)
- Engine: Volvo 2001 8 hp (6 kW) diesel engine

Hull appendages
- Keel: fin keel
- Ballast: 1,455 lb (660 kg)
- Rudder: transom-mounted rudder

Rig
- Rig type: Bermuda rig
- I foretriangle height: 32.31 ft (9.85 m)
- J foretriangle base: 10.56 ft (3.22 m)
- P mainsail luff: 27.23 ft (8.30 m)
- E mainsail foot: 8.85 ft (2.70 m)

Sails
- Sailplan: Masthead sloop
- Mainsail area: 120.49 sq ft (11.194 m^{2})
- Jib/genoa area: 170.60 sq ft (15.849 m^{2})
- Total sail area: 291.09 sq ft (27.043 m^{2})

The Beneteau First 26 is a French sailboat that was designed by Jean-Marie Finot of Groupe Finot as a cruiser-racer and first built in 1984.

== Production ==
The design was built by Beneteau in France from 1984 to 1991 with about 300 examples completed, but it is now out of production.

== Design ==
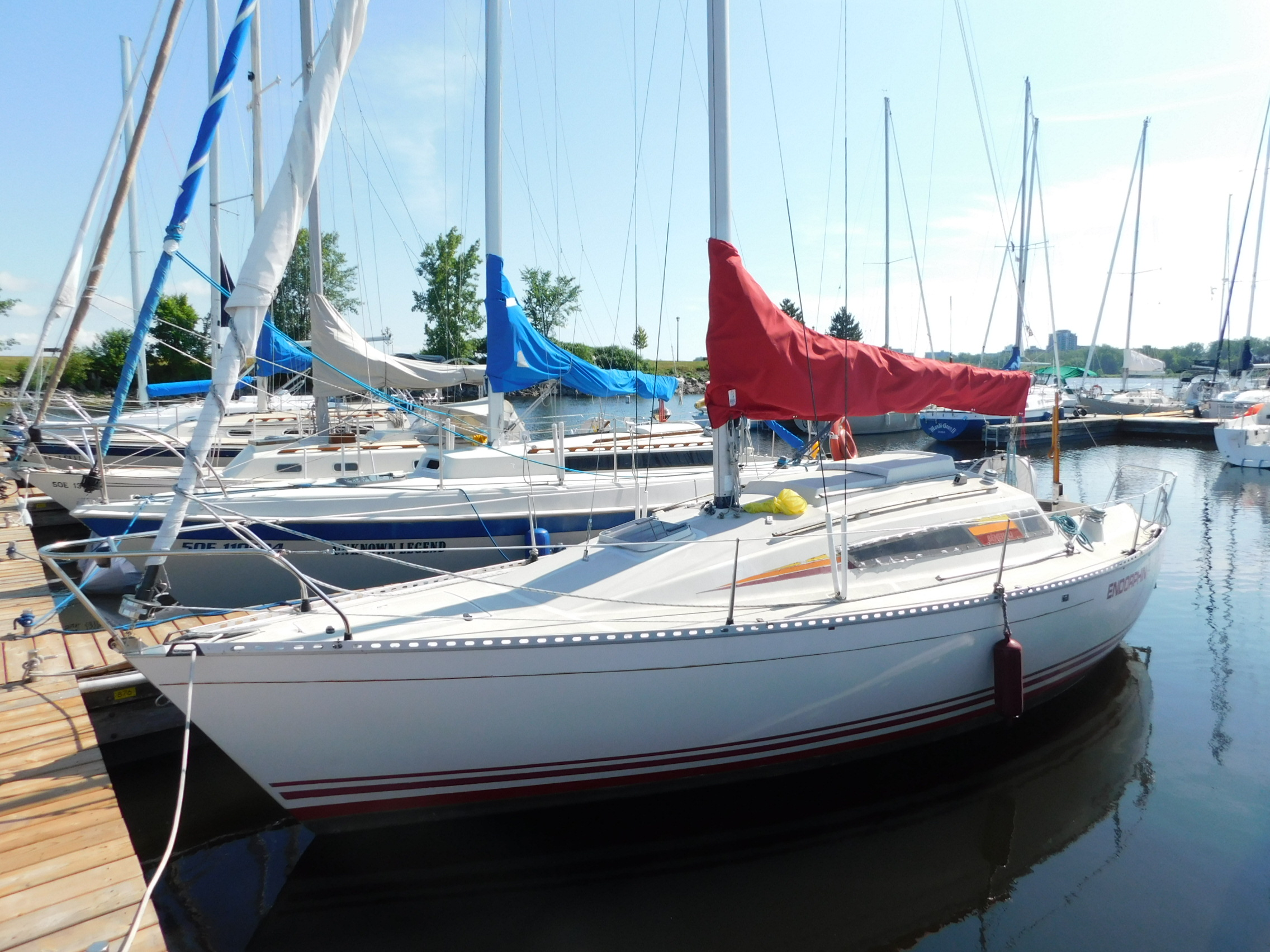
Beneteau First 26

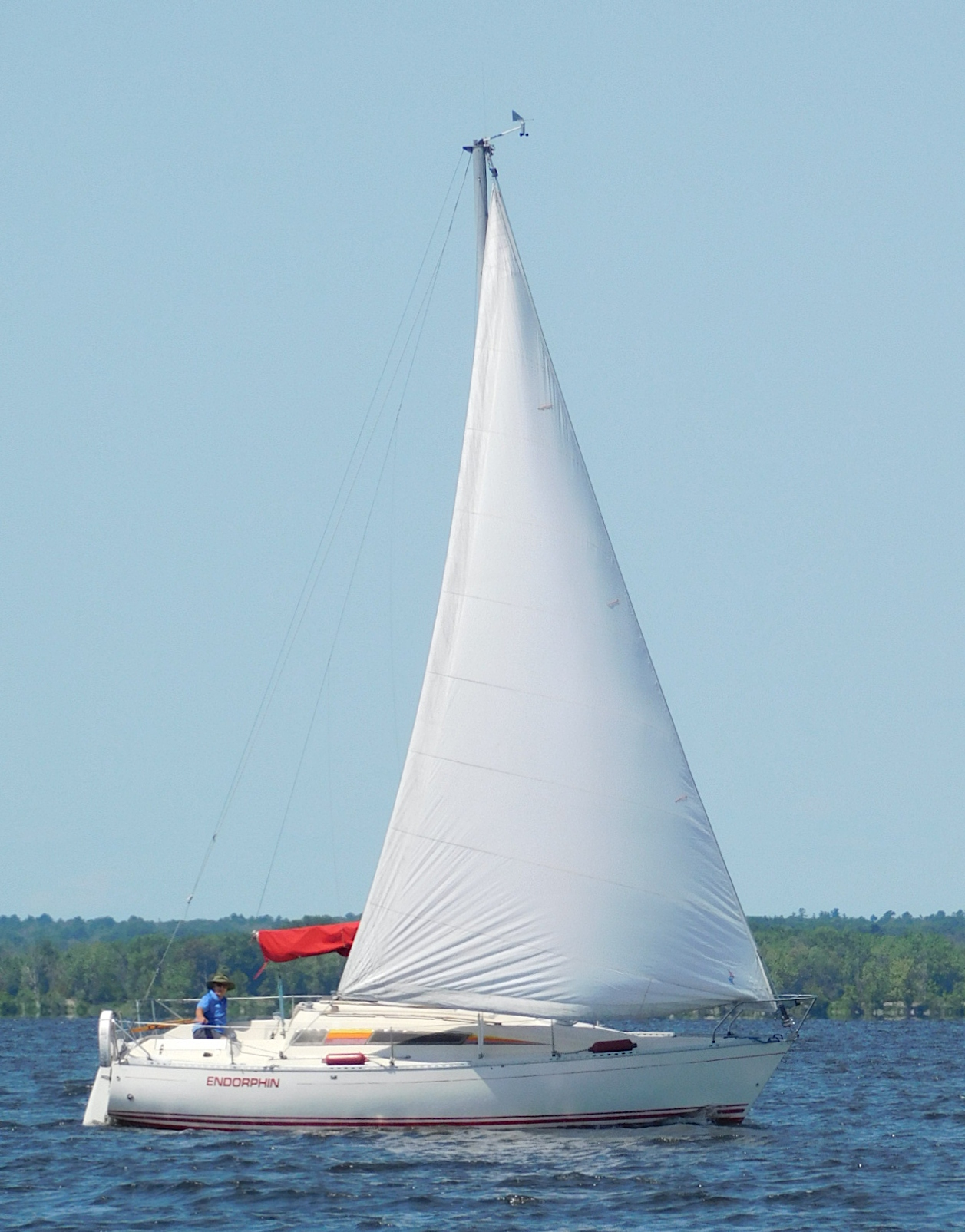
Beneteau First 26

The First 26 is a recreational keelboat, built predominantly of fiberglass, with wood trim. The deck is a sandwich of balsa, fiberglass and polyester. It has a deck-stepped mast with aluminum spars, a masthead sloop rig, a raked stem, a slightly reverse transom, a transom-hung rudder controlled by a tiller and a fixed fin keel or, optionally, a stub keel and centreboard. It has 70 in (178 cm) of headroom in the main cabin and sleeping accommodation for five people.

The boat is fitted with a Swedish Volvo 2001 8 hp (6 kW) diesel engine for docking and maneuvering. The fuel tank holds 6 U.S. gallons (23 L; 5.0 imp gal) and the fresh water tank has a capacity of 13 U.S. gallons (49 L; 11 imp gal).

The design can be equipped with a symmetrical spinnaker with an area of 603 sq ft (56.0 m^{2}). The boat has a hull speed of 6.42 kn (11.89 km/h).

== Variants ==
First 26 fin keel
This model displaces 4,814 lb (2,184 kg) and carries 1,455 lb (660 kg) of ballast. The boat has a draft of 4.30 ft (1.31 m) with the standard keel fitted.
First 26 centreboard
This model displaces 4,850 lb (2,200 kg) and carries 1,543 lb (700 kg) of ballast. The boat has a draft of 2.79 ft (0.85 m) with the centreboard retracted and 5.74 ft (1.75 m) with the centreboard extended.

== Operational history ==
In a 2010 review Steve Henkel wrote about the boat, "best features: The cabin layout is refreshingly unusual, with a dedicated space for a navigator's station, a head located aft, and a complete-looking galley (except for no icebox!). Worst features: The diesel engine, housed under the companionway ladder, will make the aft double berth hot in summer (but cozy in winter, if you like sailing among the icicles)."

== See also ==
- List of sailing boat types
