= Beneteau 373 =

Sailboat class

Development
- Designer: Berret-Racoupeau
- Location: France
- Year: 2004
- Builder: Beneteau
- Role: Cruiser-Racer
- Name: Beneteau 373

Boat
- Displacement: 14,617 lb (6,630 kg)
- Draft: 6.07 ft (1.85 m)

Hull
- Type: monohull
- Construction: glassfibre
- LOA: 36.92 ft (11.25 m)
- LOH: 36.08 ft (11.00 m)
- LWL: 32.80 ft (10.00 m)
- Beam: 12.3 ft (3.7 m)
- Engine: Yanmar 3JH4E 40 hp (30 kW) diesel engine

Hull appendages
- Keel: Fin keel
- Ballast: 3,867 lb (1,754 kg)
- Rudder: Spade-type rudder

Rig
- Rig type: Bermuda rig
- I foretriangle height: 44.72 ft (13.63 m)
- J foretriangle base: 13.92 ft (4.24 m)
- P mainsail luff: 41.00 ft (12.50 m)
- E mainsail foot: 14.42 ft (4.40 m)

Sails
- Sailplan: Fractional rigged sloop
- Mainsail area: 295.61 sq ft (27.463 m^{2})
- Jib/genoa area: 311.25 sq ft (28.916 m^{2})
- Total sail area: 606.86 sq ft (56.379 m^{2})

Racing
- PHRF: 120-141

The Beneteau 373, also called the Beneteau Oceanis 373 and Beneteau Oceanis Clipper 373 is a French sailboat that was designed by Berret-Racoupeau as a cruiser-racer and first built in 2004. The "Cipper" version includes some optional equipment as standard.

== Production ==
The design was built by Beneteau in France, starting in 2004, but it is now out of production.

== Design ==
The Beneteau 373 is a recreational keelboat, built predominantly of glassfibre, with wood trim. It has a fractional sloop masthead sloop rig, with two sets of swept spreaders and aluminium spars with stainless steel wire standing rigging. The hull has a slightly raked stem, a walk-through reverse transom with a swimming platform, an internally mounted spade-type rudder controlled by a wheel and a fixed fin keel or optional shoal-draft keel. It displaces 14,617 lb (6,630 kg) and carries 3,867 lb (1,754 kg) of cast iron ballast or 4,844 lb (2,197 kg) of ballast with the shoal draft keel.

The boat has a draft of 6.07 ft (1.85 m) with the standard keel and 4.75 ft (1.45 m) with the optional shoal draft keel.

The boat is fitted with a Japanese Yanmar 23JH4E diesel engine of 40 hp (30 kW) for docking and manoeuvring. The fuel tank holds 33 U.S. gallons (120 L; 27 imp gal) and the fresh water tank has a capacity of 99 U.S. gallons (370 L; 82 imp gal).

The design has sleeping accommodation for four to six people in two or three cabins. It has a double "V"-berth berth in the bow cabin, an L-shaped settee and a straight settee in the main cabin and an aft cabin with a double berth on the port side. A second aft cabin with a double is optional. The galley is located on the port side just forward of the companionway ladder. The galley is L-shaped and is equipped with a three-burner stove, an icebox and a double sink. A navigation station is opposite the galley, on the starboard side. The head is located aft, on the starboard side.

The design has a hull speed of 7.67 kn (14.20 km/h) and a PHRF handicap of 120 to 141, or 102 to 138 with the deep draft keel.

== See also ==
- List of sailing boat types
