= Beneteau Escapade =

Sailboat class

Development
- Designer: André Bénéteau
- Location: France
- Year: 1976
- Builder: Beneteau
- Role: Cruiser
- Name: Beneteau Escapade

Boat
- Displacement: 9,480 lb (4,300 kg)
- Draft: 4.10 ft (1.25 m)

Hull
- Type: monohull
- Construction: glassfibre
- LOA: 27.89 ft (8.50 m) with bowsprit
- LWL: 21.65 ft (6.60 m)
- Beam: 9.51 ft (2.90 m)
- Engine: 15 to 30 hp (11 to 22 kW) diesel engine

Hull appendages
- Keel: Long keel
- Ballast: 3,086 lb (1,400 kg)
- Rudder: Keel-mounted rudder

Rig
- Rig type: Cutter rig

Sails
- Sailplan: Cutter rig
- Mainsail area: 170 sq ft (16 m^{2})
- Jib/genoa area: 226 sq ft (21.0 m^{2})
- Other sails: genoa: 307 sq ft (28.5 m^{2}) solent: 117 sq ft (10.9 m^{2}) storm jib: 46 sq ft (4.3 m^{2})
- Total sail area: 703 sq ft (65.3 m^{2})

The Beneteau Escapade is a French sailboat that was designed by André Bénéteau as a cruiser and first built in 1976.

== Production ==
The design was built by Beneteau in France, starting in 1976, but it is now out of production.

== Design ==
The Escapade is a recreational keelboat, built predominantly of glassfibre, with wood trim. It has a cutter rig with a bowsprit, with one set of unswept spreaders and aluminium spars with stainless steel wire standing rigging. The hull has a highly raked stem, an angled transom, an keel-mounted rudder controlled by a tiller and a fixed long keel. It displaces 9,480 lb (4,300 kg) and carries 3,086 lb (1,400 kg) of ballast.

The boat has a draft of 4.10 ft (1.25 m) with the standard keel.

The boat is fitted with an inboard 15 to 30 hp (11 to 22 kW) diesel engine for docking and manoeuvring. The fuel tank holds 22 U.S. gallons (83 L; 18 imp gal) and the fresh water tank has a capacity of 53 U.S. gallons (200 L; 44 imp gal).

The design has sleeping accommodation for five people, with a double "V"-berth berth in the bow cabin, a drop down dinette table that forms a double berth in the main salon and a quarter berth on the starboard side, under the cockpit. The galley is located on the starboard side of the main salon. The galley is of straight configuration and is equipped with a two-burner stove, an ice box and a sink. A sliding chart table is mounted aft of the galley, on the starboard side. The head is located just aft of the bow cabin.

For sailing downwind the design may be equipped with a symmetrical spinnaker.

The design has a hull speed of 6.23 kn (11.54 km/h).

== See also ==
- List of sailing boat types
