= Beneteau First 42 =

Sailboat class

First 42
Development
- Designer: Germán Frers
- Location: France
- Year: 1981
- Builder: Beneteau
- Role: Racer-Cruiser
- Name: First 42

Boat
- Displacement: 18,738 lb (8,499 kg)
- Draft: 7.25 ft (2.21 m)

Hull
- Type: monohull
- Construction: glassfibre
- LOA: 42.92 ft (13.08 m)
- LWL: 36.00 ft (10.97 m)
- Beam: 13.08 ft (3.99 m)
- Engine: Perkins Engines 4-108 50 hp (37 kW) diesel engine

Hull appendages
- Keel: Fin keel
- Ballast: 8,818 lb (4,000 kg)
- Rudder: Spade-type rudder

Rig
- Rig type: Bermuda rig
- I foretriangle height: 52.80 ft (16.09 m)
- J foretriangle base: 16.73 ft (5.10 m)
- P mainsail luff: 46.60 ft (14.20 m)
- E mainsail foot: 14.60 ft (4.45 m)

Sails
- Sailplan: Masthead sloop
- Mainsail area: 398 sq ft (37.0 m^{2})
- Jib/genoa area: 353 sq ft (32.8 m^{2})
- Spinnaker area: 1,572 sq ft (146.0 m^{2})
- Other sails: genoa: 710 sq ft (66 m^{2}) solent: 484 sq ft (45.0 m^{2}) storm jib: 154 sq ft (14.3 m^{2})
- Upwind sail area: 1,109 sq ft (103.0 m^{2})
- Downwind sail area: 1,970 sq ft (183 m^{2})

Racing
- PHRF: 81 (shoal draft)

The Beneateau First 42, marketed in the United States as the Beneteau R/C 42, is a French sailboat that was designed by Germán Frers as a racer-cruiser and first built in 1981.

The design was derived from a Two Ton class racing boat, Gitana VII.

== Production ==
The design was built by Beneteau in France, from 1981 to 1985, but it is now out of production. The R/C 42 version for the US market was produced from 1983.

== Design ==
The First 42 is a recreational keelboat, built predominantly of glassfibre, with wood trim. The hull is solid fibreglass and the deck is balsa-cored. It has a masthead sloop rig, with a keel-stepped mast, two sets of swept spreaders and aluminium spars. The hull has a raked stem, a reverse transom, an internally mounted spade-type rudder controlled by a wheel and a fixed fin keel or optional shoal draft keel. The First 42 model displaces 18,738 lb (8,499 kg) and carries 8,818 lb (4,000 kg) of cast iron ballast, while the R/C 42 version displaces 18,600 lb (8,437 kg) and carries 8,700 lb (3,946 kg) of ballast.

The boat has a draft of 7.25 ft (2.21 m) with the standard keel and 5.42 ft (1.65 m) with the optional shoal draft keel.

The boat is fitted with a British Perkins Engines 4-108 diesel engine of 50 hp (37 kW) for docking and manoeuvring. The fuel tank holds 39.6 U.S. gallons (150 L; 33.0 imp gal) and the fresh water tank has a capacity of 105.7 U.S. gallons (400 L; 88.0 imp gal).

The design has sleeping accommodation for six people, with a double berth in the bow cabin, two U-shaped settees in the main salon along with two pilot berths and an aft cabin with a double berth on the port side. The galley is located on the port side just forward of the companionway ladder. The galley is J-shaped and is equipped with a three-burner stove, an icebox and a double sink. A navigation station is opposite the galley, on the starboard side. There are two heads, one in the bow cabin on the port side and one on the starboard side aft. Cabin maximum headroom is 76 in (193 cm).

For sailing downwind the design may be equipped with a symmetrical spinnaker of 1,572 sq ft (146.0 m^{2}).

The design has a hull speed of 8.06 kn (14.93 km/h) and a PHRF handicap of 81 for the shoal draft model.

== See also ==
- List of sailing boat types
