= Beneteau 46 =

Sailboat class

Development
- Designer: Berret-Racoupeau; Nauta Design
- Location: France
- Year: 2007
- Builder: Beneteau
- Role: Cruiser
- Name: Beneteau 46

Boat
- Displacement: 23,292 lb (10,565 kg)
- Draft: 5.75 ft (1.75 m)

Hull
- Type: monohull
- Construction: glassfibre
- LOA: 46.3 ft (14.1 m)
- LWL: 40.80 ft (12.44 m)
- Beam: 14.1 ft (4.3 m)
- Engine: Yanmar 4JH4AE 54 hp (40 kW) diesel engine

Hull appendages
- Keel: Fin keel with weighted bulb
- Ballast: 7,143 lb (3,240 kg)
- Rudder: Spade-type rudder

Rig
- Rig type: Bermuda rig
- I foretriangle height: 53.92 ft (16.43 m)
- J foretriangle base: 16.42 ft (5.00 m)
- P mainsail luff: 50.08 ft (15.26 m)
- E mainsail foot: 17.42 ft (5.31 m)

Sails
- Sailplan: Fractional rigged sloop
- Mainsail area: 436.20 sq ft (40.524 m^{2})
- Jib/genoa area: 442.68 sq ft (41.126 m^{2})
- Gennaker area: 1,291.67 sq ft (120.000 m^{2})
- Upwind sail area: 878.88 sq ft (81.651 m^{2})
- Downwind sail area: 1,727.87 sq ft (160.524 m^{2})

Racing
- PHRF: 84-96

The Beneteau 46, also sold as the Oceanis 46, is a French sailboat designed by Berret-Racoupeau as a cruiser and first built in 2007. The interior was designed by Nauta Design.

== Production ==
The design was built by Beneteau in France, starting in 2007, but it is now out of production.

== Design ==
The Beneteau 46 is a recreational keelboat, built predominantly of glassfibre, with wood trim. The hull is solid vinylester fibreglass, and the deck is balsa-cored. It has a fractional sloop rig with a deck-stepped mast and aluminium spars with stainless steel wire standing rigging. The hull has a slightly raked stem, a walk-through reverse transom with a swimming platform, an internally mounted spade-type rudder controlled by dual wheels, and a fixed fin keel with a weighted bulb or optional deep-draft keel. It displaces 23,292 lb (10,565 kg) and carries 7,143 lb (3,240 kg) of cast iron ballast in the fin keel model and 6,422 lb (2,913 kg) of ballast in the deep draft model.

The boat has a draft of 5.75 ft (1.75 m) with the standard keel and 6.75 ft (2.06 m) with the optional deep draft keel.

The boat is fitted with a Japanese Yanmar 4JH4AE diesel engine of 54 hp (40 kW) for docking and manoeuvring. The fuel tank holds 53 U.S. gallons (200 L; 44 imp gal), and the fresh water tank has a capacity of 150 U.S. gallons (570 L; 120 imp gal).

The design was built with two and three cabin interiors, with sleeping accommodation for four to six people. The two-cabin arrangement has a double "V"-berth in the bow cabin, a U-shaped settee and a straight settee in the main salon, and an aft cabin with a diagonal double island berth on the starboard side. The three-cabin interior divides the large aft cabin into two, each with a double berth. The galley is on the port side, just aft of the companionway ladder. The galley is C-shaped and is equipped with a two-burner stove, a refrigerator, a freezer, and a double sink. A navigation station is opposite the galley on the starboard side. There are two heads with showers, one in the bow cabin on the port side and one on the starboard side aft.

For sailing downwind, the design may be equipped with an asymmetrical spinnaker of 1,291.67 sq ft (120.000 m^{2}).

The design has a hull speed of 8.48 kn (15.70 km/h) and a PHRF handicap of 84 to 96 for the standard keel and 69 to 90 for the deep-draft keel.

== Operational history ==
In a 2007 Cruising World review, Andrew Burton wrote, "From the moment you climb aboard the Beneteau 46, you notice innovations that make operating the boat easier. Standing on the transom swim platform, you’ll see an insert with a locking hatch sized for a six-man life raft. Remove the insert to install a small generator under the cockpit sole. Twin wheels flank a seat that folds out of the way when boarding. The long cockpit overlooks a cambered, raised deckhouse. Water past the dodger will be channeled to the deck from the wide dashboard."

In a 2008 review for Sail Magazine, Tom Dove wrote, "The most striking feature of the 46 is its unique aft cabin. The diagonal berth is easy to reach from three sides and adds headroom where it's most needed. This arrangement will be very comfortable in port."

In a 2008 Practical Sailor review, Darrell Nicholson wrote, "Though it is relatively light for its size and carries a good-sized rig, we wouldn’t call it 'sensitive.' Creating its breeze, the 46 we tested powered through puffs and lulls without great variation on the knotmeter. Its helm remains light and tacked through 90 degrees with minimal fuss. She has a balanced rudder set well aft, and you could tell. Steering was precise and easy under both sail and power. Tracking was excellent."

== See also ==
- List of sailing boat types
