= Beneteau 523 =

Sailboat class

Development
- Designer: Groupe Finot
- Location: France
- Year: 2001
- Builder: Beneteau
- Role: Cruiser
- Name: Beneteau 523

Boat
- Displacement: 30,864 lb (14,000 kg)
- Draft: 7.71 ft (2.35 m)

Hull
- Type: monohull
- Construction: glassfibre
- LOA: 53.31 ft (16.25 m)
- LWL: 48.00 ft (14.63 m)
- Beam: 16.01 ft (4.88 m)
- Engine: Yanmar 100 hp (75 kW) diesel engine

Hull appendages
- Keel: Fin keel with weighted bulb
- Ballast: 10,965 lb (4,974 kg)
- Rudder: Spade-type rudder

Rig
- Rig type: Bermuda rig
- I foretriangle height: 65.22 ft (19.88 m)
- J foretriangle base: 20.77 ft (6.33 m)
- P mainsail luff: 59.87 ft (18.25 m)
- E mainsail foot: 22.28 ft (6.79 m)

Sails
- Sailplan: Fractional rigged sloop
- Mainsail area: 666.95 sq ft (61.962 m^{2})
- Jib/genoa area: 677.31 sq ft (62.924 m^{2})
- Total sail area: 1,344.26 sq ft (124.886 m^{2})

The Beneteau 523, also called the Oceanis 523, is a French sailboat that was designed by Groupe Finot as a cruiser and first built in 2001. With a list of optional equipment as standard, it was sold as the Oceanis Clipper 523.

== Production ==
The design was built by Beneteau in France, starting in 2001, but it is now out of production.

== Design ==
The Beneteau 523 is a recreational keelboat, built predominantly of glassfibre, with wood trim. The hull is solid fibreglass and the deck is balsa-cored. It has a fractional sloop rig and aluminium spars. The hull has a slightly raked stem, a reverse transom with a swimming platform, an internally mounted spade-type rudder controlled by dual wheels and a fixed fin keel with a weighted bulb or optional shoal draft keel. It displaces 30,864 lb (14,000 kg) and carries 10,965 lb (4,974 kg) of ballast.

The boat has a draft of 7.71 ft (2.35 m) with the standard keel and 5.92 ft (1.80 m) with the optional shoal draft keel.

The boat is fitted with a Japanese Yanmar 2GMF Yanmar 2GM20 diesel engine of 100 hp (75 kW) for docking and manoeuvring. The fuel tank holds 198 U.S. gallons (750 L; 165 imp gal) and the fresh water tank has a capacity of 119 U.S. gallons (450 L; 99 imp gal).

The design was built with a range of interior configurations. Typical is one with sleeping accommodation for eight people, with a double "V"-berth in the bow cabin, a forward cabin with a double island berth, a U-shaped settee and a straight settee in the main salon and two aft cabins, each with a double berth. The galley is located on the starboard side of the main salon. The galley is Z-shaped and is equipped with a three-burner stove, a refrigerator, freezer and a double sink. A navigation station is aft of the galley, also on the starboard side. There are four heads, one for each cabin.

The design has a hull speed of 9.28 kn (17.19 km/h).

== Operational history ==
In a 2006 Cruising World review, Jeremy McGeary wrote, "under sail, the Beneteau 523 reveals its racing genealogy, making an effortless 8 knots or so in the 12 to 15 knots of breeze we encountered on Chesapeake Bay and showing no inclination to fight the helm. The inboard sheeting, aided by shroud bases in the middle of the side decks, helped the boat tack easily through 90 degrees. Given the wholesome traveler, the full-battened mainsail, and the 7-foot-6-inch draft (a 6-foot-2-inch draft is an option), a crew intent on making the anchorage by lunchtime would have no problems."

In a 2006 review for Sail magazine, Bill Springer concluded, "the 523 shows that a new boat design doesn't have to be revolutionary to be effective. Its lines are pleasing, traditional, and nonthreatening. The accommodation plan makes excellent use of the available interior volume (especially in the master cabin)—not by reconfiguring a traditional layout, but rather by skillfully executing subtle refinements and enhancements. The boat is manageable enough for a cruising couple and big enough to accommodate three cruising couples. Its long waterline and light displacement promise good speed potential."

== See also ==
- List of sailing boat types
