= Beneteau 43 =

Sailboat class

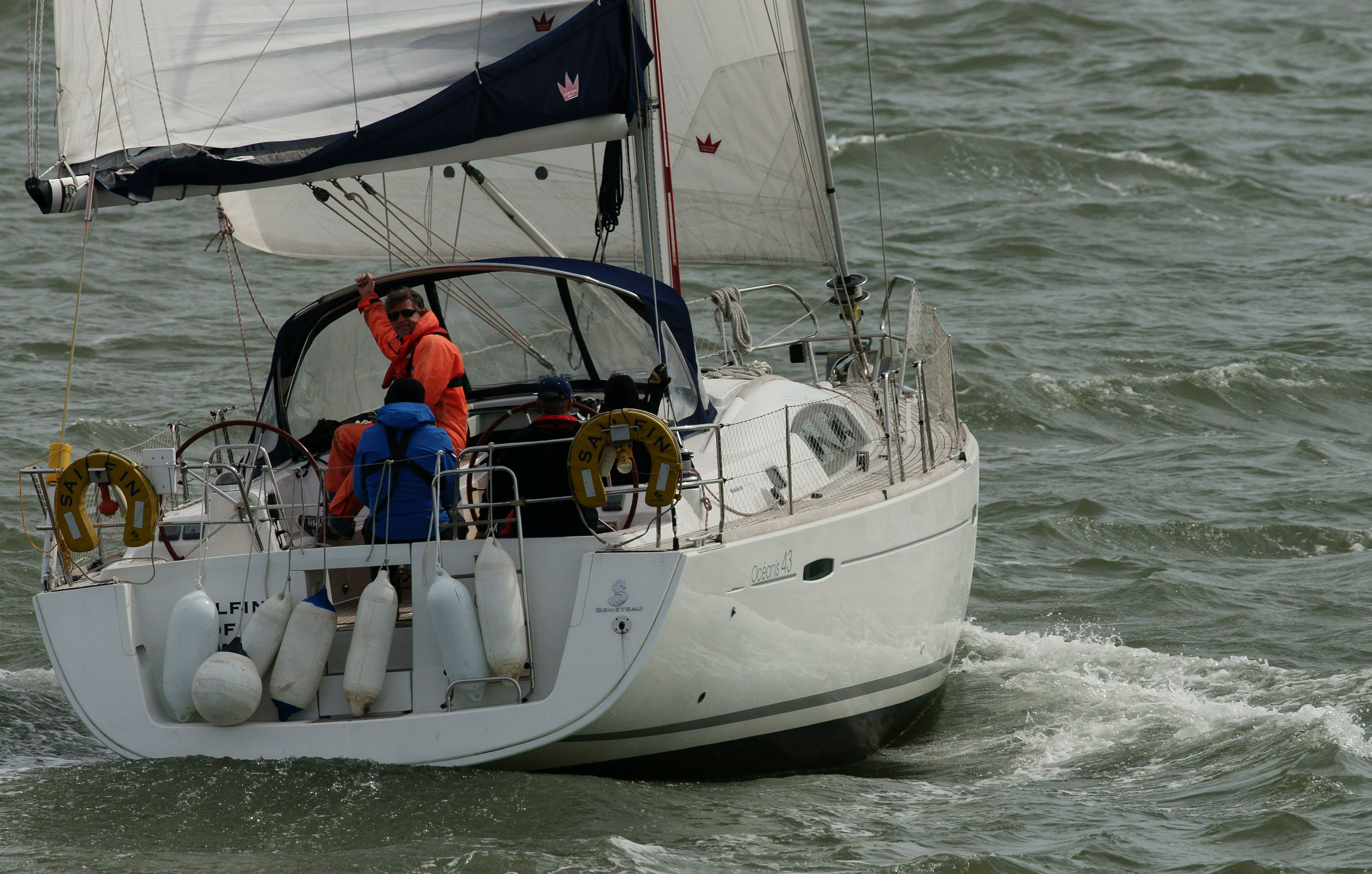

Development
- Designer: Berret-Racoupeau; Nauta Design
- Location: France
- Year: 2006
- Builder: Beneteau
- Role: Cruiser
- Name: Beneteau 43

Boat
- Displacement: 19,566 lb (8,875 kg)
- Draft: 5.42 ft (1.65 m)

Hull
- Type: monohull
- Construction: glassfibre
- LOA: 43.00 ft (13.11 m)
- LWL: 38.08 ft (11.61 m)
- Beam: 13.50 ft (4.11 m)
- Engine: Yanmar 4JH4AE 54 hp (40 kW) diesel engine

Hull appendages
- Keel: Fin keel
- Ballast: 6,239 lb (2,830 kg)
- Rudder: Spade-type rudder

Rig
- Rig type: Bermuda rig
- I foretriangle height: 51.75 ft (15.77 m)
- J foretriangle base: 15.33 ft (4.67 m)
- P mainsail luff: 47.50 ft (14.48 m)
- E mainsail foot: 15.75 ft (4.80 m)

Sails
- Sailplan: 19/20 Fractional rigged sloop
- Mainsail area: 274.06 sq ft (25.461 m^{2})
- Jib/genoa area: 396.66 sq ft (36.851 m^{2})
- Total sail area: 770.72 sq ft (71.602 m^{2})

Racing
- PHRF: 108-114

The Beneteau 43, also called the Oceanis 43 and for the yacht charter market, the Moorings 43.4, is a French sailboat that was designed by Berret-Racoupeau as a cruiser and first built in 2006. The interior was designed by Nauta Design.

== Production ==
The design was built by Beneteau in France, starting in 2006, but it is now out of production.

== Design ==
The Beneteau 43 is a recreational keelboat, built predominantly of glassfibre, with wood trim. The hull is solid fibreglass and the deck is balsa-cored. It has a 19/20 fractional sloop rig, with two sets of unswept spreaders and aluminium spars. The hull has a slightly raked stem, a walk through reverse transom with a swimming platform, an internally mounted spade-type rudder controlled by dual 915 mm (36.0 in) diameter wheels and a fixed fin keel or optional deep-draft keel. It displaces 19,566 lb (8,875 kg) and carries 6,239 lb (2,830 kg) of cast iron ballast. The deep draft keel model carries 5,456 lb (2,475 kg) of ballast.

The boat has a draft of 5.42 ft (1.65 m) with the standard keel and 6.58 ft (2.01 m) with the optional deep draft keel.

The boat is fitted with a Japanese Yanmar 4JH4AE diesel engine of 54 hp (40 kW) for docking and manoeuvring. The fuel tank holds 53 U.S. gallons (200 L; 44 imp gal) and the fresh water tank has a capacity of 95 U.S. gallons (360 L; 79 imp gal).

The design was built with several different interior layouts, including two large cabins with two heads, three cabins with three heads and four cabins with two heads. The four cabin arrangement was popular with yacht charter companies.

The two cabin interior is typical. It has sleeping accommodation for four people, with a double "V"-berth berth in the bow cabin, a U-shaped settee and a straight settee in the main salon and an aft cabin with a transverse central double berth. The galley is located on the port side at the companionway ladder. The galley is C-shaped and is equipped with a four-burner stove, a refrigerator, freezer and a double sink. There are two heads, both with showers, one in the bow cabin on the starboard side and one on the starboard side in the aft cabin. Cabin maximum headroom is 80 in (203 cm).

For sailing downwind the design may be equipped with a symmetrical cruising spinnaker.

The design has a hull speed of 8.27 kn (15.32 km/h) and a PHRF handicap of 108 to 114 with the standard fin keel and 102 to 123 for the deep draft keel model.

== Operational history ==
In a 2007 Yachting Monthly review, Chris Beeson wrote, "bearing off, the steering became more leisurely, gaining an assured touch I hadn’t noticed upwind, still responsive but tracking steadily. The Bénéteau Océanis 43 beam reached deliciously at 7-9 knots in 14-18 knots. Broad reaching with white sails, 5-6 knots in 12-18 knots was comfortable, if unspectacular. A cruising chute added a knot or two to the deeper angles and a bigger smile to the helmsman’s face."

In a 2008 Cruising World review, Jeremy McGeary wrote, "the wind profile across the Potomac River allowed us to see the boat broad-reach at 7.8 knots in 17 knots true and at 5.8 knots in less than 12 knots. On the wind, it was only a little slower."

In a 2009 review for Sail Magazine, Peter Nielsen noted, "the four-cabin/two head version seems to be the hot ticket for charter fleets, though, at least for value-conscious charterers. You could squeeze ten people onto this boat, not that you’d necessarily want to. Jamming four cabins into a 43* hull while retaining enough saloon, galley, and stowage space to make the boat a viable vacation platform can’t have been easy, but the collaboration of Berret/Racoupeau (hull) and Nauta Design (interior) has done it nicely."

== See also ==
- List of sailing boat types
