= Beneteau Cabochard =

Sailboat class

Cabochard
Development
- Designer: André Bénéteau
- Location: France
- Year: 1974
- Builder: Beneteau
- Role: Cruiser
- Name: Cabochard

Boat
- Displacement: 772 lb (350 kg)
- Draft: 1.80 ft (0.55 m)

Hull
- Type: monohull
- Construction: glassfibre
- LOA: 13.29 ft (4.05 m)
- Beam: 5.97 ft (1.82 m)
- Engine: outboard motor

Hull appendages
- Keel: Long keel
- Ballast: 231 lb (105 kg)
- Rudder: Transom-mounted rudder

Rig
- Rig type: Bermuda rig

Sails
- Sailplan: Fractional rigged sloop
- Total sail area: 102.00 sq ft (9.476 m^{2})

The Beneteau Cabochard is recreational keelboat first built in 1974 by Beneteau in France. It is now out of production.

== Design ==
Designed by André Bénéteau the glassfibre hull has a slightly raked stem, an angled transom, a transom-hung rudder controlled by a tiller and a fixed long keel. It displaces 772 lb (350 kg) and carries 231 lb (105 kg) of ballast.

The boat has a draft of 1.80 ft (0.55 m) with the standard keel and is normally fitted with a small outboard motor for docking and maneuvering. It has sleeping accommodation for two people, with two berths in the cabin. It has a fractional sloop rig, with aluminium spars with stainless steel wire standing rigging.
