= Beneteau First 285 =

1980s recreational keelboat

First 285
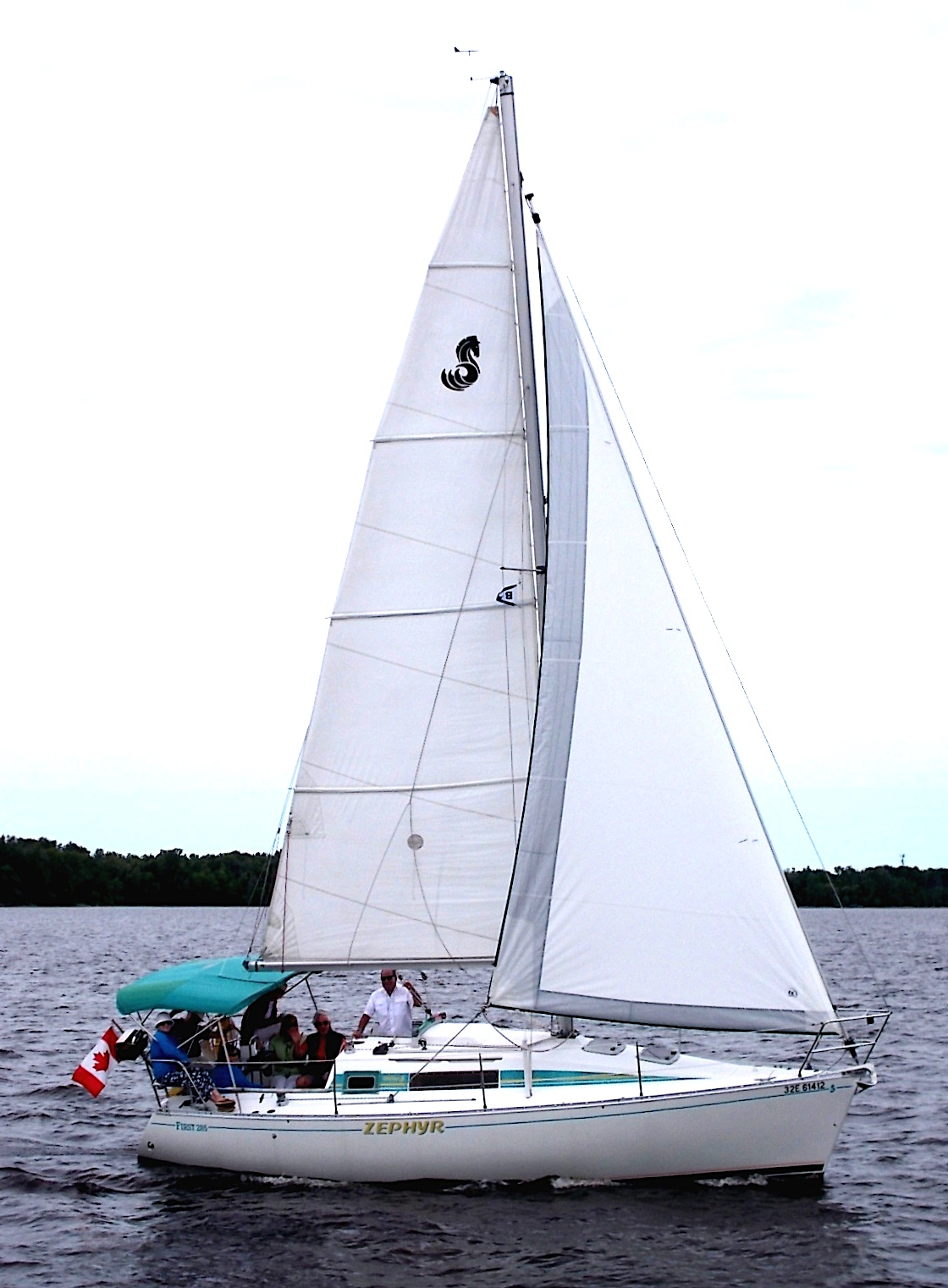

Development
- Designer: Group Finot
- Location: France
- Year: 1985
- No. built: 451
- Builder: Beneteau
- Name: First 285

Boat
- Displacement: 6,160 lb (2,794 kg)
- Draft: 5.25 ft (1.60 m)

Hull
- Type: Monohull
- Construction: glassfibre
- LOA: 28.16 ft (8.58 m)
- LWL: 24.25 ft (7.39 m)
- Beam: 9.83 ft (3.00 m)
- Engine: inboard diesel engine

Hull appendages
- Keel: fin keel
- Ballast: 2,115 lb (959 kg)
- Rudder: internally-mounted spade-type rudder

Rig
- General: Fractional rigged sloop
- I foretriangle height: 32.51 ft (9.91 m)
- J foretriangle base: 10.30 ft (3.14 m)
- P mainsail luff: 31.23 ft (9.52 m)
- E mainsail foot: 11.08 ft (3.38 m)

Sails
- Mainsail area: 173.01 sq ft (16.073 m^{2})
- Jib/genoa area: 167.43 sq ft (15.555 m^{2})
- Total sail area: 340.4 sq ft (31.62 m^{2})

The Beneteau First 285 is a recreational keelboat. Beneteau built 451 in France and the United States from 1985 to 1993.

Designed by Group Finot, the glassfibre hull has an internally-mounted spade-type rudder. It has a draft of 5.25 ft (1.60 m) with the standard keel, 3.75 ft (1.14 m) with the optional shoal draft keel and 3.8 ft (1.2 m) with the optional wing keel. It has a hull speed of 6.6 kn (12.22 km/h).

It was offered with tiller or wheel steering.

It has a fractional sloop rig with a deck-stepped mast.

== Gallery ==
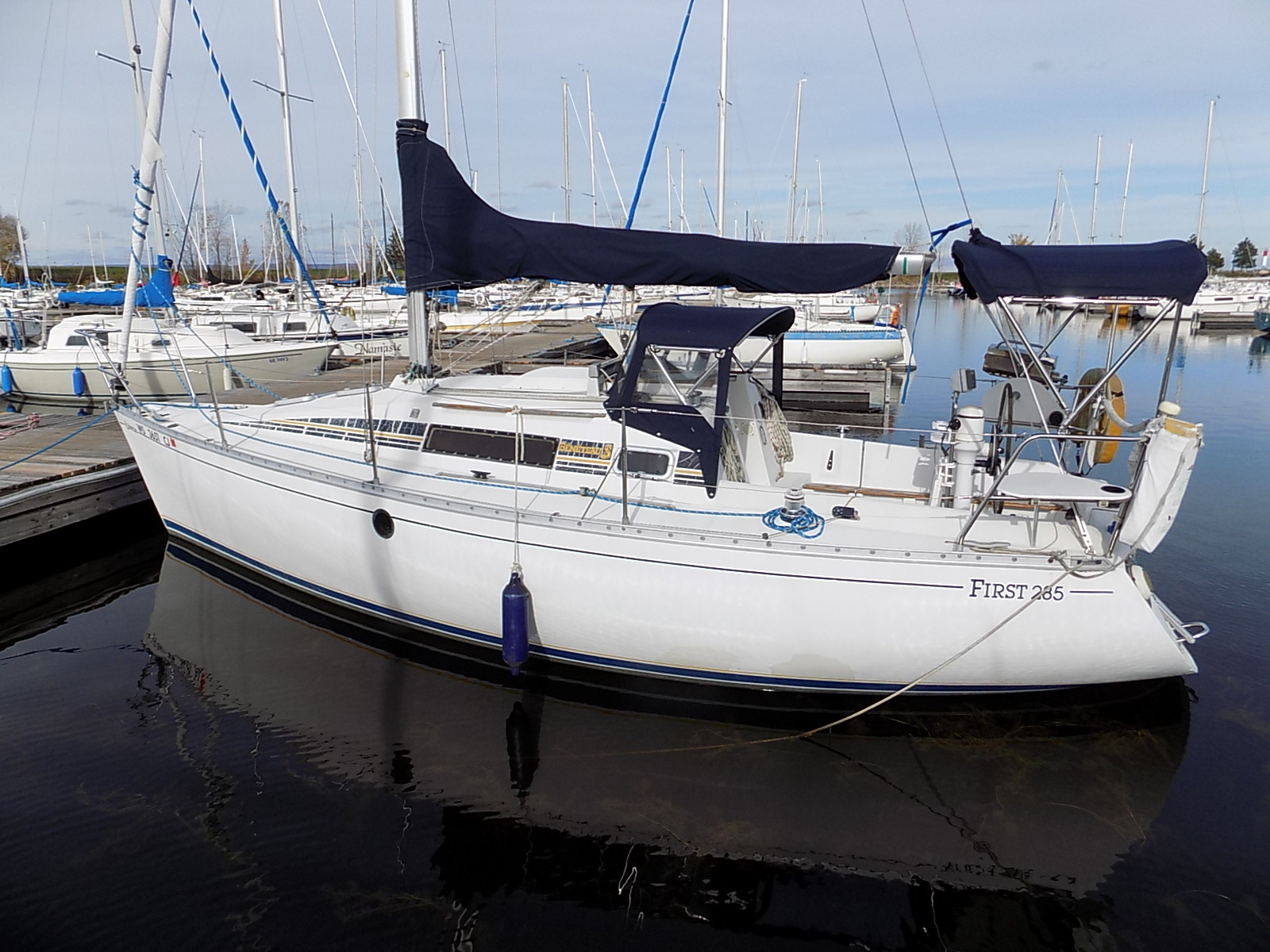
Beneteau First 285

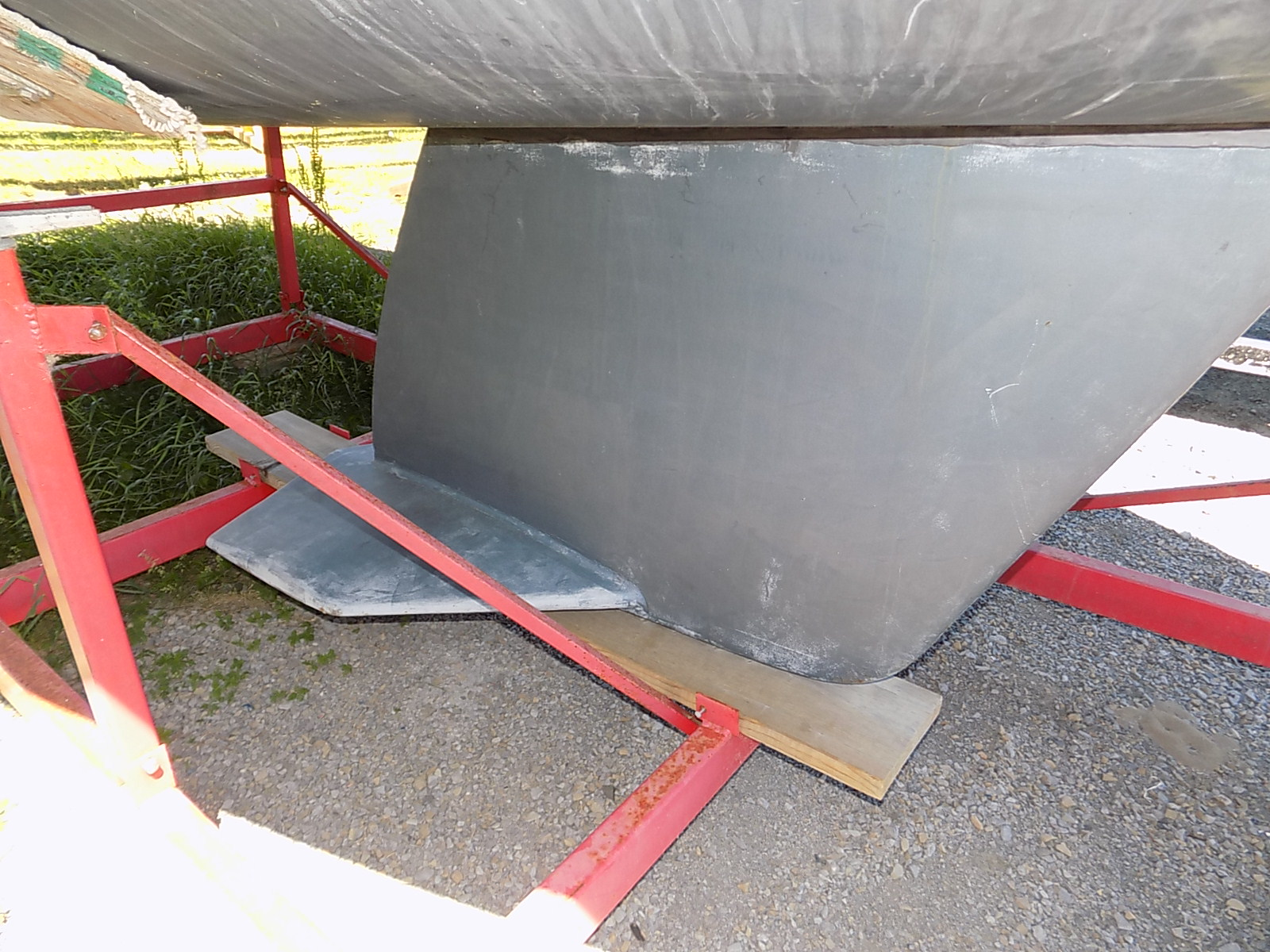
Beneteau First 285 wing keel
