= Beneteau 40 =

Sailboat class

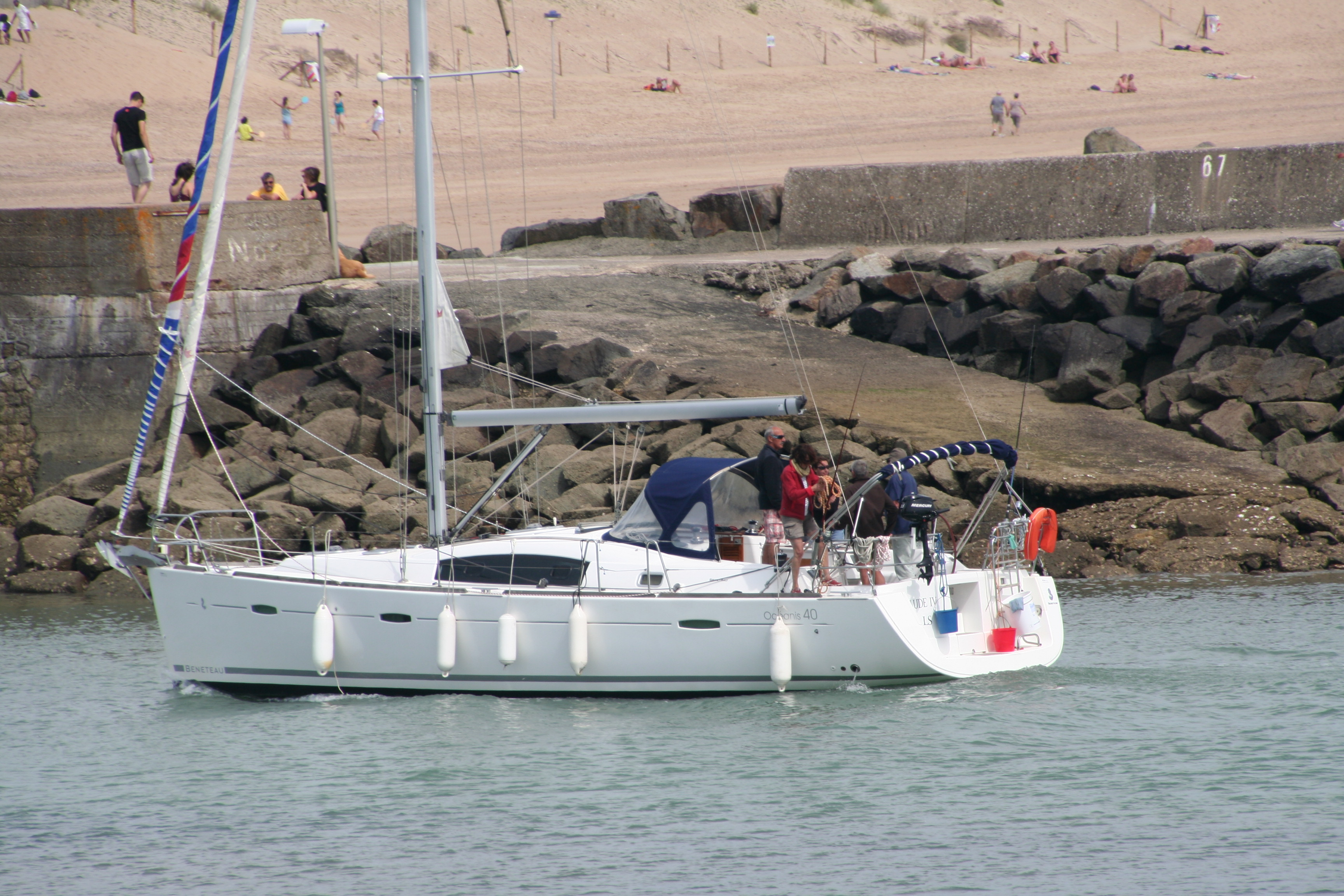
- Beneteau Oceanis 40

Development
- Designer: Berret-Racoupeau; Nauta Design
- Location: France
- Year: 2007
- Builder: Beneteau
- Role: Cruiser-Racer
- Name: Beneteau 40

Boat
- Displacement: 18,210 lb (8,260 kg)
- Draft: 5.08 ft (1.55 m)

Hull
- Type: monohull
- Construction: glassfibre
- LOA: 39.83 ft (12.14 m)
- LWL: 33.92 ft (10.34 m)
- Beam: 12.83 ft (3.91 m)
- Engine: Yanmar 3JH4E 40 hp (30 kW) diesel engine

Hull appendages
- Keel: Fin keel
- Ballast: 5,198 lb (2,358 kg)
- Rudder: Spade-type rudder

Rig
- Rig type: Bermuda rig
- I foretriangle height: 49.25 ft (15.01 m)
- J foretriangle base: 12.92 ft (3.94 m)
- P mainsail luff: 45.67 ft (13.92 m)
- E mainsail foot: 15.75 ft (4.80 m)

Sails
- Sailplan: Fractional rigged sloop
- Mainsail area: 359.65 sq ft (33.413 m^{2})
- Jib/genoa area: 318.16 sq ft (29.558 m^{2})
- Gennaker area: 960 sq ft (89 m^{2})
- Total sail area: 677.81 sq ft (62.971 m^{2})

Racing
- PHRF: 69-135

The Beneteau 40 is a French sailboat that was designed by Berret-Racoupeau as a cruiser-racer and first built in 2007. Versions were also sold as the Oceanis 40 cruiser and the Moorings 41.3 for the yacht charter market. The interior was designed by Nauta Design.

The design was named Cruising World's Best Midsize Cruiser in the 2008 Boat of the Year competition.

== Production ==
The design was built by Beneteau in France and in Marion, South Carolina, United States, starting in 2007, but it is now out of production.

== Design ==
The Beneteau 40 is a recreational keelboat, built predominantly of glassfibre, with wood trim and Plexus-bonded bulkheads. It has a fractional sloop rig, with two sets of swept spreaders and aluminium spars with stainless steel wire standing rigging. The hull has a slightly raked stem, a walk through reverse transom with a swimming platform, an internally mounted spade-type rudder controlled by dual wheels and a fixed fin keel or optional deep-draft keel.

The boat is fitted with a Japanese Yanmar 3JH4E diesel engine of 40 hp (30 kW) for docking and manoeuvring.

The design has sleeping accommodation for four to six people in two and thee cabin interior arrangements. The two cabin interior has a double "V"-berth in the bow cabin, a U-shaped settee in the main salon and an aft cabin with a double berth on the starboard side. The galley is located on the port side of the companionway ladder. The galley is C-shaped and is equipped with a two-burner stove, a refrigerator, freezer and a double sink. The head is located on the starboard side of the main salon. The three cabin design adds a second aft cabin to port, moves the galley to the main salon and adds a second head in the bow cabin.

For sailing downwind the design may be equipped with an asymmetrical spinnaker of 960 sq ft (89 m^{2}).

The design has a hull speed of 7.80 kn (14.45 km/h) and a PHRF handicap of 69 to 135 with the deep draft keel and 108 to 162 with the shoal draft keel.

== Variants ==
Beneteau 40
This model was introduced in 2007. It has a length overall of 39.83 ft (12.1 m), a waterline length of 33.92 ft (10.3 m), displaces 18,210 lb (8,260 kg) and carries 5,198 lb (2,358 kg) of ballast with the standard keel and 4,643 lb (2,106 kg) of cast iron ballast with the shoal draft keel. The boat has a draft of 6.24 ft (1.90 m) with the standard keel and 5.08 ft (1.55 m) with the optional shoal draft keel. The fuel tank holds 53 U.S. gallons (200 L; 44 imp gal) and the fresh water tank has a capacity of 100 U.S. gallons (380 L; 83 imp gal).
Oceanis 40
This model was introduced in 2008. It has a length overall of 39.86 ft (12.1 m), a waterline length of 33.96 ft (10.4 m), displaces 18,210 lb (8,260 kg). The boat has a draft of 6.23 ft (1.90 m) with the standard keel and 5.09 ft (1.55 m) with the optional shoal draft keel. The fuel tank holds 53 U.S. gallons (200 L; 44 imp gal) and the fresh water tank has a capacity of 95 U.S. gallons (360 L; 79 imp gal).
Moorings 41.3
This model was first built in August 2007 and launched as a 2008 model year, for Moorings Yacht Charter. It has a length overall of 39.83 ft (12.1 m), a waterline length of 33.92 ft (10.3 m), displaces 16,931 lb (7,680 kg) and carries 5,198 lb (2,358 kg) of ballast. The boat has a draft of 5.09 ft (1.55 m) with the standard keel. The fuel tank holds 52 U.S. gallons (200 L; 43 imp gal) and the fresh water tank has a capacity of 95 U.S. gallons (360 L; 79 imp gal).

== Operational history ==
In a 2007 Cruising World review, Mark Pillsbury noted, "comfortable and stylish belowdecks and well organized topsides, the Beneteau 40 showed light-air performance on the waters off Annapolis last fall that hinted at good handling in a stiffer breeze and convinced the [Boat Of The Year] judges that this boat was a standout among the Midsize Cruisers."

In a 2020 used boat review for the SpinSheet, Tarn Kelsey wrote, "described as 'one of the most popular used boats available,' the Beneteau 40 seems to hit that sweet spot, small enough to be an easily managed weekend platform for a couple or young family or large enough to be utilized and outfitted for extended cruising by a couple or young family; granted three teenagers and a Labradoodle may make you squeeze a little."

In a 2007 review of the Moorings 41.3 in Cruising World, Jeremy McGeary wrote, "when a new Beneteau model appears, it's often followed by a Moorings branded vessel in the same envelope. The Moorings 41.3 is the Beneteau 40 with Berret-Racoupeau hull design and Nauta Design decor, fitted out to The Moorings specification as a charter boat."

== See also ==
- List of sailing boat types
