= Beneteau California 6.60 =

Sailboat class

Development
- Designer: André Bénéteau
- Location: France
- Year: 1982
- No. built: 150
- Builder: Beneteau
- Role: Fishing boat, day sailer, cruiser
- Name: Beneteau California 6.60

Boat
- Displacement: 3,527 lb (1,600 kg)
- Draft: 2.95 ft (0.90 m)

Hull
- Type: monohull
- Construction: glassfibre
- LOA: 21.65 ft (6.60 m)
- LWL: 17.81 ft (5.43 m)
- Beam: 8.20 ft (2.50 m)
- Engine: Yanmar 18 hp (13 kW) diesel engine

Hull appendages
- Keel: Long keel
- Ballast: 882 lb (400 kg)
- Rudder: Skeg-mounted/Spade-type/Transom-mounted rudder

Rig
- Rig type: Bermuda rig

Sails
- Sailplan: Fractional rigged sloop
- Total sail area: 227.00 sq ft (21.089 m^{2})

The Beneteau California 6.60, sometimes called the 660, is a recreational keelboat built by Beneteau in France, from 1982 until 1987, with 150 boats completed. It is now out of production.

== Design ==
The design's designation is its length overall in metres.

Designed by André Bénéteau the glassfibre hull has a raked stem, a vertical transom, a transom-hung rudder controlled by a tiller and a fixed long keel or optional twin bilge keels. It displaces 3,527 lb (1,600 kg) and carries 882 lb (400 kg) of ballast.

The boat has a draft of 2.95 ft (0.90 m) with the standard long keel and 2.3 ft (0.70 m) with the optional twin bilge keels.

It has a fractional sloop rig, with a deck-stepped mast and aluminium spars with stainless steel wire standing rigging.

The boat is fitted with an outboard motor or a Yanmar diesel engine of 18 hp (13 kW).

The design has sleeping accommodation for four people, with a double "V"-berth in the bow cabin and a drop down table in the main salon that forms a double berth. The galley is located on the port side just forward of the companionway ladder. The galley is of straight configuration and is equipped with a single-burner stove and a sink. The enclosed head is located just aft of the bow cabin on the port side.

The design has a hull speed of 5.66 kn (10.48 km/h).
