= Beneteau 461 =

Sailboat class

Development
- Designer: Bruce Farr; Armel Briand
- Location: France
- Year: 1996
- No. built: 210
- Builder: Beneteau
- Role: Cruiser
- Name: Beneteau 461

Boat
- Displacement: 20,944 lb (9,500 kg)
- Draft: 5.74 ft (1.75 m)

Hull
- Type: monohull
- Construction: glassfibre
- LOA: 46.59 ft (14.20 m)
- LWL: 39.37 ft (12.00 m)
- Beam: 13.95 ft (4.25 m)
- Engine: Yanmar 4JH2E diesel engine

Hull appendages
- Keel: Fin keel
- Ballast: 7,496 lb (3,400 kg)
- Rudder: Spade-type rudder

Rig
- Rig type: Bermuda rig
- I foretriangle height: 54.53 ft (16.62 m)
- J foretriangle base: 15.94 ft (4.86 m)
- P mainsail luff: 46.55 ft (14.19 m)
- E mainsail foot: 17.06 ft (5.20 m)

Sails
- Sailplan: Masthead sloop
- Mainsail area: 473 sq ft (43.9 m^{2})
- Jib/genoa area: 617 sq ft (57.3 m^{2})
- Upwind sail area: 1,089 sq ft (101.2 m^{2})

Racing
- PHRF: 84-93

The Beneteau 461, also called the Oceanis 461, is a French sailboat that was designed by Bruce Farr as a cruiser and first built in 1996. Armel Briand designed the interior. With optional equipment included as standard it was known as the Oceanis Clipper 461.

Additional versions for the yacht charter market were produced as the Moorings 463, the Moorings 464 and the Moorings 465, differing by interior cabin arrangements.

The design was named Cruising World magazine's 1997 Boat of the Year: Best Value, Full-Size Cruiser.

== Production ==
The design was built by Beneteau in France, from 1996 to 2001, with 210 boats completed, but it is now out of production.

== Design ==
The Beneteau 461 is a recreational keelboat, built predominantly of glassfibre, with wood trim. The hull is solid fibreglass and the deck is balsa-cored. It has a masthead sloop rig, with a keel-stepped mast, two sets of swept spreaders and aluminium spars with discontinuous stainless steel wire standing rigging. The hull has a raked stem, a reverse transom with a swimming platform, an internally mounted spade-type rudder controlled by a wheel and a fixed fin keel with a weighted bulb. It displaces 20,944 lb (9,500 kg) and carries 7,496 lb (3,400 kg) of cast iron ballast.

The boat may be fitted with a classical hoisting mainsail or a mast furling main of smaller dimensions.

The boat has a draft of 5.74 ft (1.75 m) with the standard keel.

The boat is fitted with a Japanese Yanmar diesel engine of 48 to 85 hp (36 to 63 kW) for docking and manoeuvring. The fuel tank holds 53 U.S. gallons (200 L; 44 imp gal) and the fresh water tank has a capacity of 145 U.S. gallons (550 L; 121 imp gal).

The design was built with two, three or four cabins, with sleeping accommodation for four to eight people. The two cabin interior has a double island berth in the bow cabin, a U-shaped settee and a straight settee in the main salon and an aft cabin with a double berth on the port side. The three cabin interior adds an extra aft cabin and the four cabin interior splits the bow cabin in two. The galley is located on the starboard side at the companionway ladder. The galley is L-shaped and is equipped with a four-burner stove, a refrigerator, freezer and a double sink. A navigation station is opposite the galley, on the port side. With all cabin arrangements there are two heads. Cabin maximum headroom is 77 in (196 cm).

The design has a hull speed of 8.37 kn (15.50 km/h) and a PHRF handicap of 84 to 93.

== Operational history ==
In a 2009 review, Yachting Monthly noted, "this was the second-largest model in the Océanis range. Her hull, drawn by Bruce Farr, is essentially the same as the sporty First 45F5 and she has a good turn of speed under sail. She has been equally successful as a large family cruiser and a charter yacht for a couple of families, and a blue-water home for a couple – although some have suggested her build quality is on the light side for serious ocean-bashing."

== See also ==
- List of sailing boat types
