= Beneteau Baroudeur =

Keelboat design

Baroudeur
Development
- Designer: André Bénéteau
- Location: France
- Year: 1970
- No. built: 200
- Builder: Beneteau
- Role: Cruiser

Boat
- Displacement: 5,071 lb (2,300 kg)
- Draft: 3.44 ft (1.05 m)

Hull
- Type: monohull
- Construction: glassfibre
- LOA: 22.31 ft (6.80 m)
- LWL: 19.19 ft (5.85 m)
- Beam: 8.17 ft (2.49 m)
- Engine: Renault 15 hp (11 kW) diesel engine gasoline engine

Hull appendages
- Keel: Long keel
- Ballast: 1,653 lb (750 kg)
- Rudder: Keel-mounted rudder

Rig
- Rig type: Bermuda rig

Sails
- Sailplan: Masthead sloop
- Total sail area: 266 sq ft (24.7 m^{2})

The Beneteau Baroudeur s a recreational keelboat. It was built by Beneteau in France, from 1970 until 1980, with 200 boats completed.

== Design ==
Designed by André Bénéteau, it is built predominantly of glassfibre, with wood trim. It has a masthead sloop rig, with a deck-stepped mast, one set of unswept spreaders and aluminium spars with stainless steel wire standing rigging. The hull has a spooned raked stem, an angled transom, a keel-hung rudder controlled by a tiller and a fixed long keel. It displaces 5,071 lb (2,300 kg) and carries 1,653 lb (750 kg) of ballast.

The boat has a draft of 3.44 ft (1.05 m) with the standard keel. The Baroudeur is fitted with a French Renault 15 hp (11 kW) gasoline engine for docking and manoeuvring.

The design has sleeping accommodation for five people, with a double berth in the bow cabin, a drop-down table in the main cabin and quarter berth on the starboard side aft. The galley is located on the starboard, amidships and is equipped with a two-burner stove and a sink. The head is located in the bow cabin on the starboard side.

The design has a hull speed of 5.87 kn (10.87 km/h).

The name means Adventurer in English.
