= Beneteau =

French boat manufacturer

- Type: Public
- Traded as: Euronext: BEN; CAC Small
- Industry: Boat building
- Founded: 1884; 142 years ago in Saint-Gilles-Croix-de-Vie, France
- Founders: Benjamin Bénéteau, André Bénéteau, Annette Roux
- Headquarters: 16 Boulevard de la Mer, Saint-Gilles-Croix-de-Vie, France
- Key people: Jérome de Metz (CEO)
- Parent: Groupe Beneteau
- Divisions: Jeanneau Lagoon; Excess; Delphia; Four Winns; Wellcraft; Scarab Glastron
- Subsidiaries: Rec Boat Holdings LLC
- Website: www.beneteau.com

Beneteau or Bénéteau (French pronunciation: [beneto]) is a French sail and motorboat manufacturer, with production facilities in France and in the United States. The company’s holding company (Groupe Beneteau) includes the brands Jeanneau and its multihull subsidiary Lagoon.

== History ==
Shipwright Benjamin Bénéteau founded the company in 1884, at Croix-de-Vie, France to build sailing trawlers. In the mid sixties, Benjamin's grandchildren Annette Bénéteau Roux and her brother André Bénéteau introduced a line of fiberglass boats.

== Production ==
The main production facility is in France, with five factories in the Vendée area. Until 2020, they had one US plant in Marion, South Carolina, which produced boats for the American market and opened in 1986. Over time, the factory nearly doubled in size to about 250,000 square feet (23,000 m^{2}). By May 2017, the Marion plant had built more than 8,700 boats. The Marion plant was closed in September 2020 and production was moved to the existing facilities in France.

== Beneteau sailing models ==
Below is a list of Beneteau yacht models.

=== Early models ===
Name	Designer	Years	Notes
Guppy	-	1964	Dinghy
Fletan	-	1966	
Galion	-	1967	
Baroudeur	André Bénéteau	1970	
Piranha	-	1972	
Kerlouan	André Bénéteau	1972	
Capelan	André Bénéteau	1972	
Baroudeur MkII	André Bénéteau	1973	
Cabochard	André Bénéteau	1973	
Escapade	André Bénéteau	1976	
Chenapan	André Bénéteau	1976	
Canot 3.90	-	1977	Junk Rig
Wizz	Jean-Marie Finot	1981	Two Person Dinghy
California 5.20	André Bénéteau	1982	
California 4.70	André Bénéteau	1983	
California 6.60	André Bénéteau	1983	
California 5.50	André Bénéteau	1986	
Beneteau Idylle 880	André Bénéteau	1982	
Beneteau Idylle 1050	André Bénéteau	1985	
Beneteau Idylle 1150	Jean Berret	1983	
Beneteau Idylle 1350	Germán Frers	1984	
Beneteau Idylle 1550	Germán Frers	1985	(also known as the Mooring 51)

=== One design racing ===
Sortable table
Name	Designer	Years	Notes
Mumm 36	Bruce Farr	1992	European Builder
Beneteau 25 / Platu 25	Bruce Farr	1996	European Builder
First Class 7	Jean-Marie Finot; Jacques Fauroux	1984	Racer/Cruiser
First Class 7.5	Jean-Marie Finot	2003	Racer
First Class 8	Jean-Marie Finot; Jacques Fauroux	1982	
First Class 10	Jean-Marie Finot; Jacques Fauroux	1983	
First Class 12	Jean-Marie Finot	1986	
First Class Europe	Jean-Marie Finot	1989	
First Class Challenge	Jean-Marie Finot; Jean Berret	1992	
Beneteau Figaro	Jean-Marie Finot; Jean Berret	1994	
Beneteau Figaro 2	Marc Lombard	2002	
Beneteau Figaro 3	Van Peteghem – Lauriot Prévost	2017–Present	

=== Racer/cruiser - first series ===
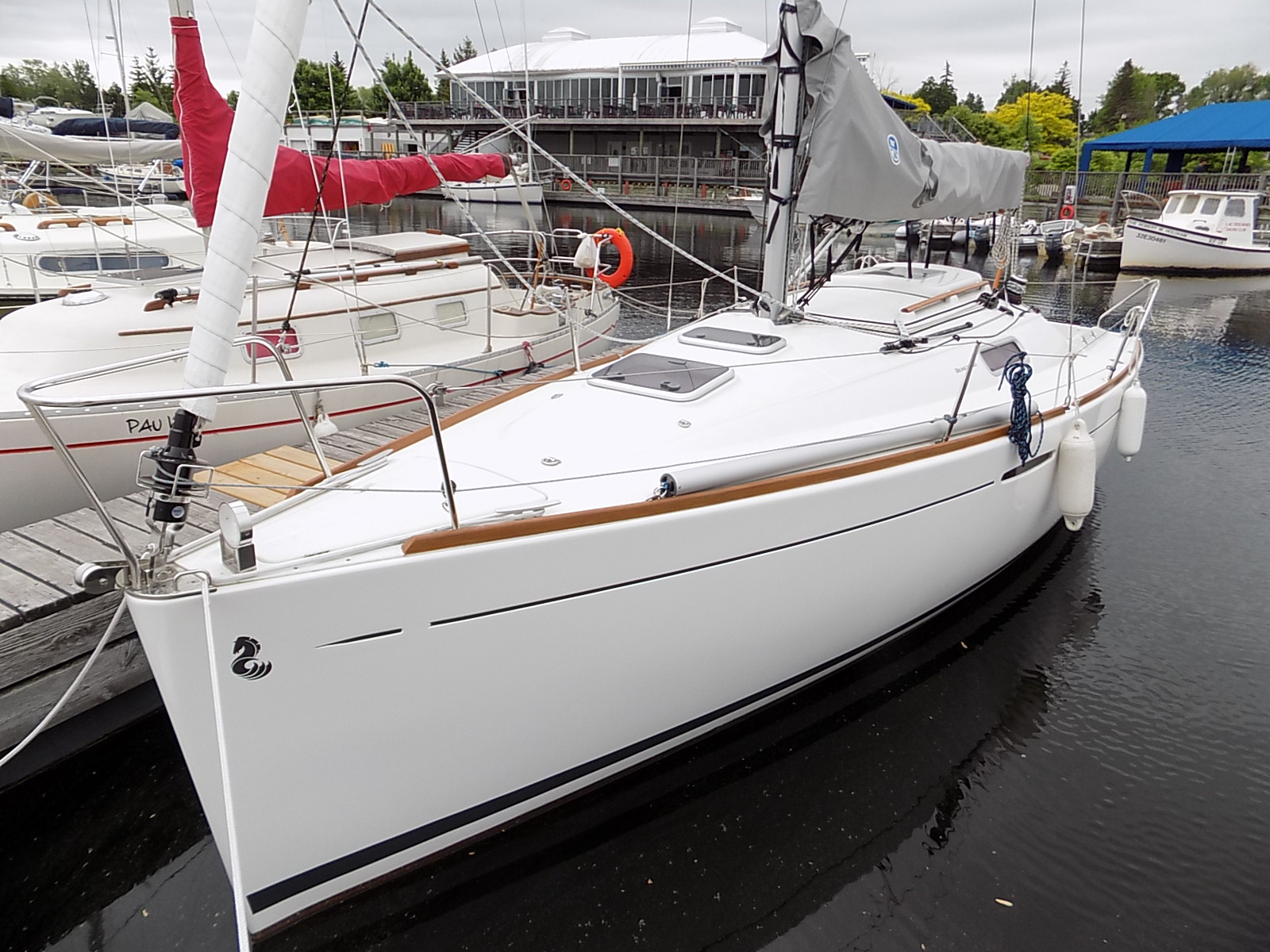
First 25.7

These are racer/cruiser sailboats, with a higher emphasis on the racing aspects, yet are substantially equipped for comfortable cruising. They are equipped with tall fractional rigs, high performance keels and upgraded deck hardware. Introduced in 1976 with the First 30 model designed by Andre Mauric. The current First models being offered include:

Name	Designer	Years	Notes
GENERATION 1
First 18	Groupe Finot	1979	
First 22	Groupe Finot	1978	
First 24	Jean-Marie Finot	1983	
First 25	Jean-Marie Finot	1980	
First 26	Jean-Marie Finot	1984	
First 27	André Mauric	1978	
First 28	Jean-Marie Finot	1981	
First 29	Groupe Finot	1984	
First 30 & 30E	André Mauric	1977	
First 32	Jean Berret	1981	
First 38	Jean Berret	1982	
First 42	Germán Frers	1981	
GENERATION 2
First 235	Jean-Marie Finot	1986	
First 265	Jean-Marie Finot	1991	
First 285	Jean-Marie Finot	1987	
First 305	Jean Berret	1985	
First 310	Groupe Finot	1990	
First 325	Jean Berret	1984	
First 345	Jean Berret	1984	
First 375	Jean Berret	1985	
First 405	Jean Berret	1986	
First 435	Germán Frers	1985	
First 456	Germán Frers	1983	
First 51	Germán Frers	1987	
GENERATION 3
First 32S5	Jean Berret	1988	Philippe Starck
First 35S5	Jean Berret	1988	Philippe Starck
First 35.7	Jean Berret	1992	Philippe Starck
First 36S7	Jean Berret	1995	Philippe Starck
First 38S5	Jean Berret	1989	Philippe Starck
First 41S5	Jean Berret	1989	Philippe Starck
First 42S7	Bruce Farr	1994	Philippe Starck
First 45F5	Bruce Farr	1990	Sergio PININFARINA
First 53F5	Bruce Farr	1990	Sergio PININFARINA
GENERATION 4
First 210 Spirit	Jean-Marie Finot	1992	
First 211	Groupe Finot	1998	
First 260 Spirit	Groupe Finot	1995	
First 300 Spirit	Groupe Finot	1994	
First 31.7	Finot Conq et Associés	1998	
First 33.7	Berret Racoupeau Yacht Design	1996	
First 36.7	Farr Yacht Design	2001	
First 40.7	Farr Yacht Design	1997	
First 44.7	Farr Yacht Design	2003	
First 47.7	Farr Yacht Design	1999	
GENERATION 5
First 21.7	Groupe Finot	2004	
First 21.7S	Finot Conq et Associés	2007	
First 25.7	Jean-Marie Finot	2004	
First 27.7s	Groupe Finot	2002	
First 34.7 (10R)	Farr Yacht Design	2005	
GENERATION 6
First 20	Finot-Conq Architects		
First 25	Finot-Conq Architects		
First 30	Juan Yacht Design	2010	Nauta Design
First 35	Farr Yacht Design	2008	Nauta Design
First 40	Farr Yacht Design	2007	Nauta Design
First 45	P. Briand Yacht Design	2007	
First 50	P. Briand Yacht Design	2006	Veerle Battiau
GENERATION 7
First 53	Biscontini Yacht Design	2019–Present	Styling: Lorenzo Argento

=== Sense series ===
Introduced in 2010, the Sense range is a modern interpretation of a cruising yacht, incorporating several industry firsts, while the company continued to produce the more conventional Oceanis cruising range. It introduced innovations to the deck, superstructure, and interior design.

- Sense 50 (First built in 2010)
- Sense 43 (First built in 2011)
- Sense 55 (First built in 2012)
- Sense 46 (First built in 2013)
- Sense 57 (First built in 2016)

=== Oceanis Series ===
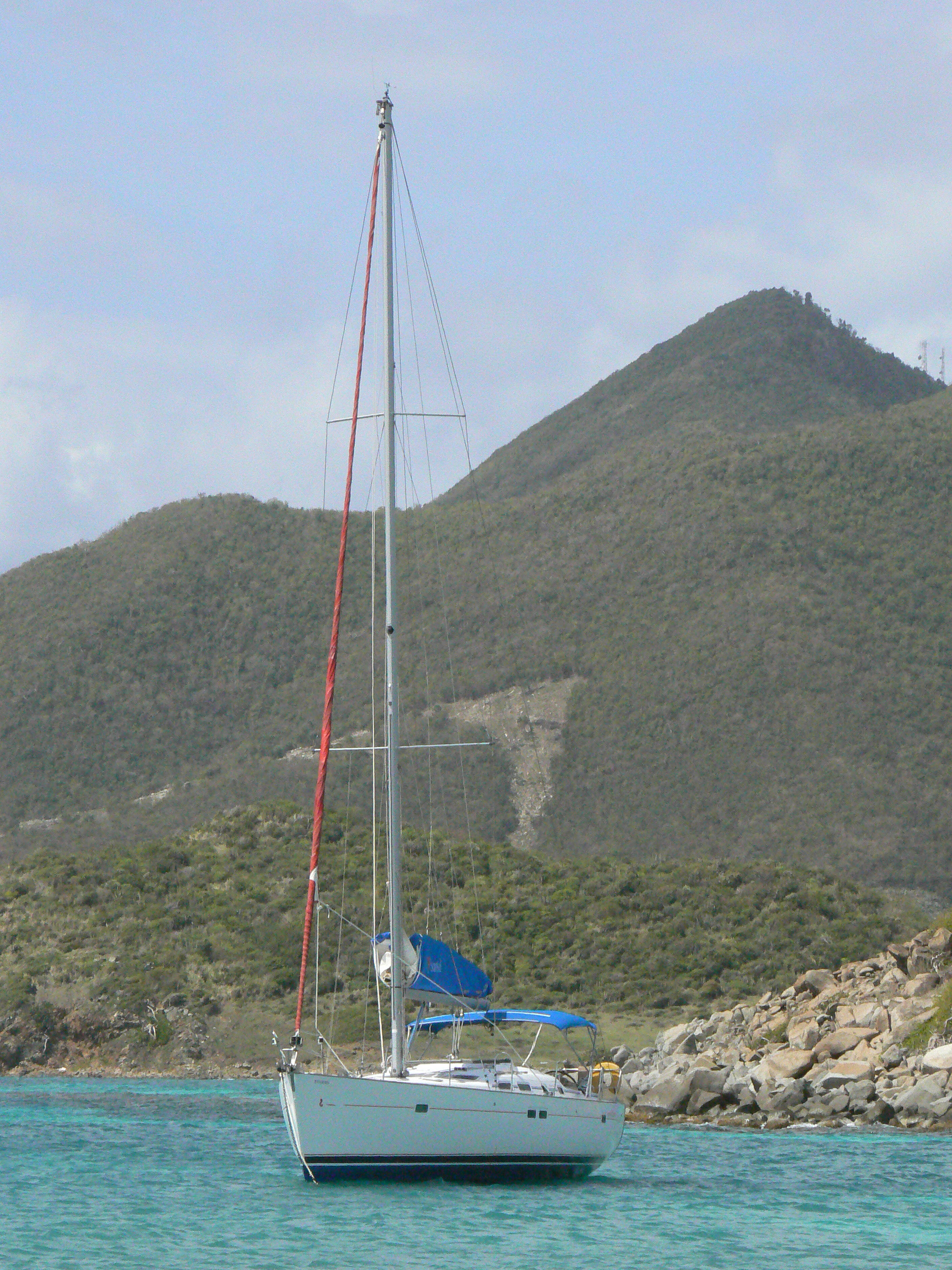
A Beneteau Oceanis 473 (47.3 feet)

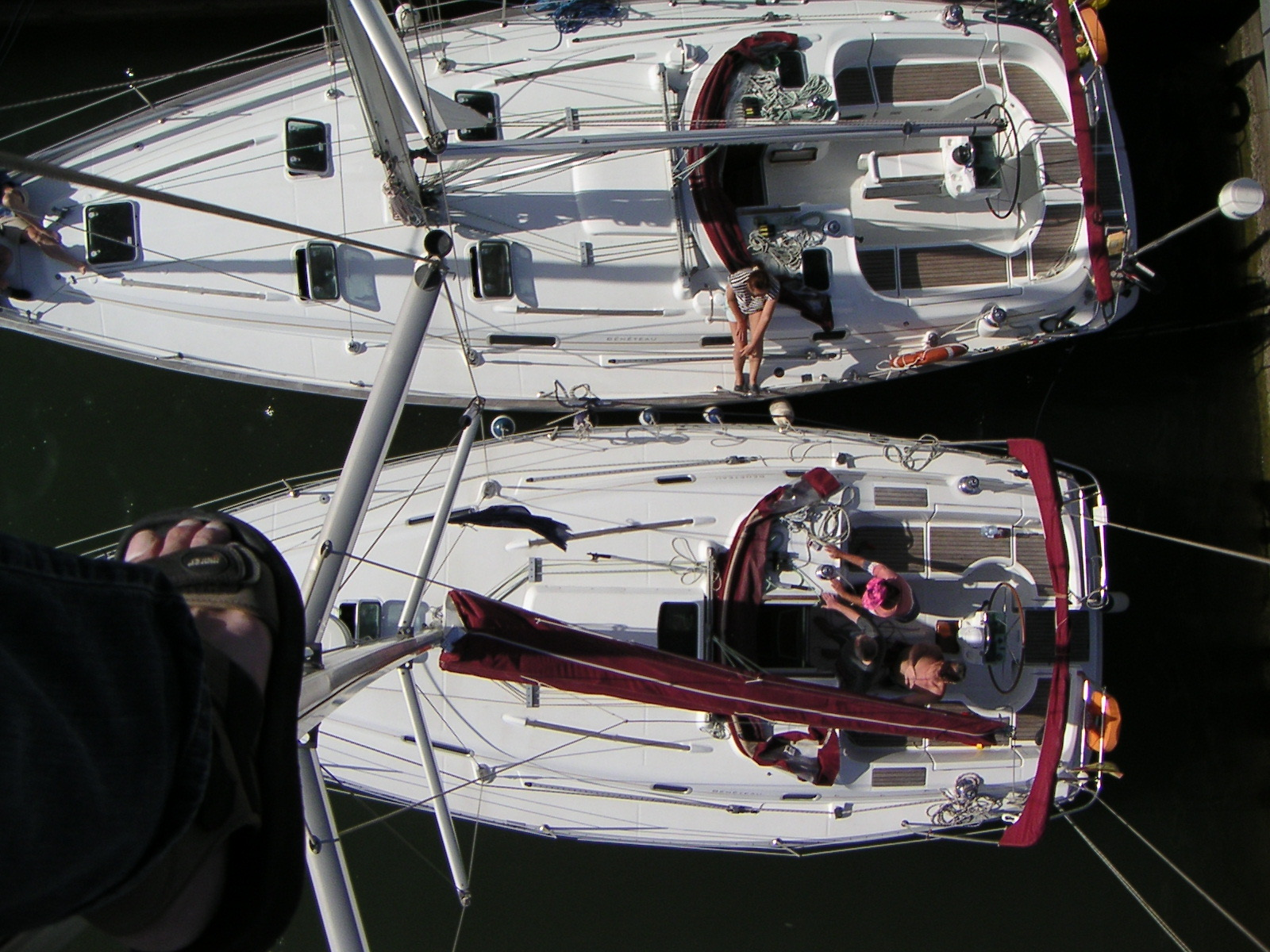
View from a bosun's chair towards the ship decks of two slightly different Oceanis Clipper 411, from a height of around 15 m, the full mast height of the 41 feet (c. 12 m) long yacht. The photo was taken while a broken line running over the top of the mast had to be replaced during a sailing trip.

Name	Designer	Years	Notes
GENERATION 1 (Launched 1986-1991)
Oceanis 320	Philippe Briand	1987	
Oceanis 350	Philippe Briand	1985	
Oceanis 370	Philippe Briand	1989	
Oceanis 390		1987	
Oceanis 430	Philippe Briand	1985	
Oceanis 500	Philippe Briand	1987	
GENERATION 2 (Launched 1991-1995)
Oceanis 281	Jean-Marie Finot	1994	
Oceanis 300	Jean-Marie Finot	1991	
Oceanis 321	Jean-Marie Finot	1994	
Oceanis 351 / 352	Jean Berret; Olivier Racoupeau	1993	Armel Briand
Oceanis 400	Jean-Marie Finot	1992	
Oceanis 440	Bruce Farr	1991	
Oceanis 461	Bruce Farr	1995	Armel Briand
Oceanis 50	Bruce Farr	1995	Armel Briand
Oceanis 510	Philippe Briand	1992	
GENERATION 3 (Launched 1993-2003)
Oceanis 36CC	Jean Berret; Olivier Racoupeau	1996	Armel Briand
Oceanis 40CC	Jean-Marie Finot	1994	Armel Briand
Oceanis 42CC	Jean-Marie Finot	2001	
Oceanis 44CC	Bruce Farr	1994	Armel Briand
Oceanis 57	Bruce Farr	2002	Franck Darnet Design
GENERATION 4 (Launched 1995-2008)
Oceanis Clipper 311			
Oceanis Clipper 323			
Oceanis Clipper 331			
Oceanis Clipper 343			
Oceanis Clipper 361			
Oceanis Clipper 373			
Oceanis Clipper 381			
Oceanis Clipper 393			
Oceanis Clipper 411			
Oceanis Clipper 423			
Oceanis Clipper 473			
Oceanis Clipper 523	Jean-Marie Finot	2004	
GENERATION 5
Oceanis 34	Jean-Marie Finot	2008	Nauta Design
Oceanis 37	Jean-Marie Finot; Pascal Conq	2007	Nauta Design
Oceanis 40	Jean Berret; Olivier Racoupeau	2006	Nauta Design
Oceanis 41	Finot - Conq & Associés	2011	Nauta Design
Oceanis 43	Jean Berret; Olivier Racoupeau	2006	Nauta Design
Oceanis 46	Jean Berret; Olivier Racoupeau	2007	Nauta Design
Oceanis 50	Jean Berret; Olivier Racoupeau	2005	Nauta Design
Oceanis 50 mk2	Jean Berret; Olivier Racoupeau	2009	Nauta Design
Oceanis 54	Jean Berret; Olivier Racoupeau	2008	Nauta Design
Oceanis 58	Jean Berret; Olivier Racoupeau	2009	Nauta Design
GENERATION 6
Oceanis 31	Finot - Conq		Nauta Design
Oceanis 35	Finot - Conq	2014	Nauta Design
Oceanis 38	Finot - Conq	2014	Nauta Design
Oceanis 45	Finot - Conq		Nauta Design
Oceanis 48	Berret Racoupeau Yacht Design		Nauta Design
Oceanis 55	Berret Racoupeau Yacht Design		Nauta Design
Oceanis 60	Berret Racoupeau Yacht Design		Nauta Design
GENERATION 7
Oceanis 30.1	Finot - Conq		Nauta Design
Oceanis 35.1	Finot - Conq	2017	Nauta Design
Oceanis 38.1	Finot - Conq	2017	Nauta Design
Oceanis 41.1	Finot - Conq		Nauta Design
Oceanis 46.1	Finot - Conq		Nauta Design
Oceanis 51.1	Berret Racoupeau Yacht Design		Nauta Design
Oceanis 55.1	Berret Racoupeau Yacht Design		Nauta Design
Oceanis Yacht 62	Berret Racoupeau Yacht Design		Andreani Design

=== Seascape ===
In 2018, Beneteau purchased Seascape and rebranded its products under the Beneteau First brand.

== Beneteau Powerboats models ==
=== Swift Trawler series ===
These are trawler yacht powerboats. The Swift Trawler 42 was the company's first trawler yacht and the first Beneteau powerboat to reach the U.S. Market.

=== Outboard motorboats ===
These are outboard powered motorboats in three different models: Antares cabin cruisers, Barracuda seafishing boats and Flyer console boats.

== Notable boats or models ==
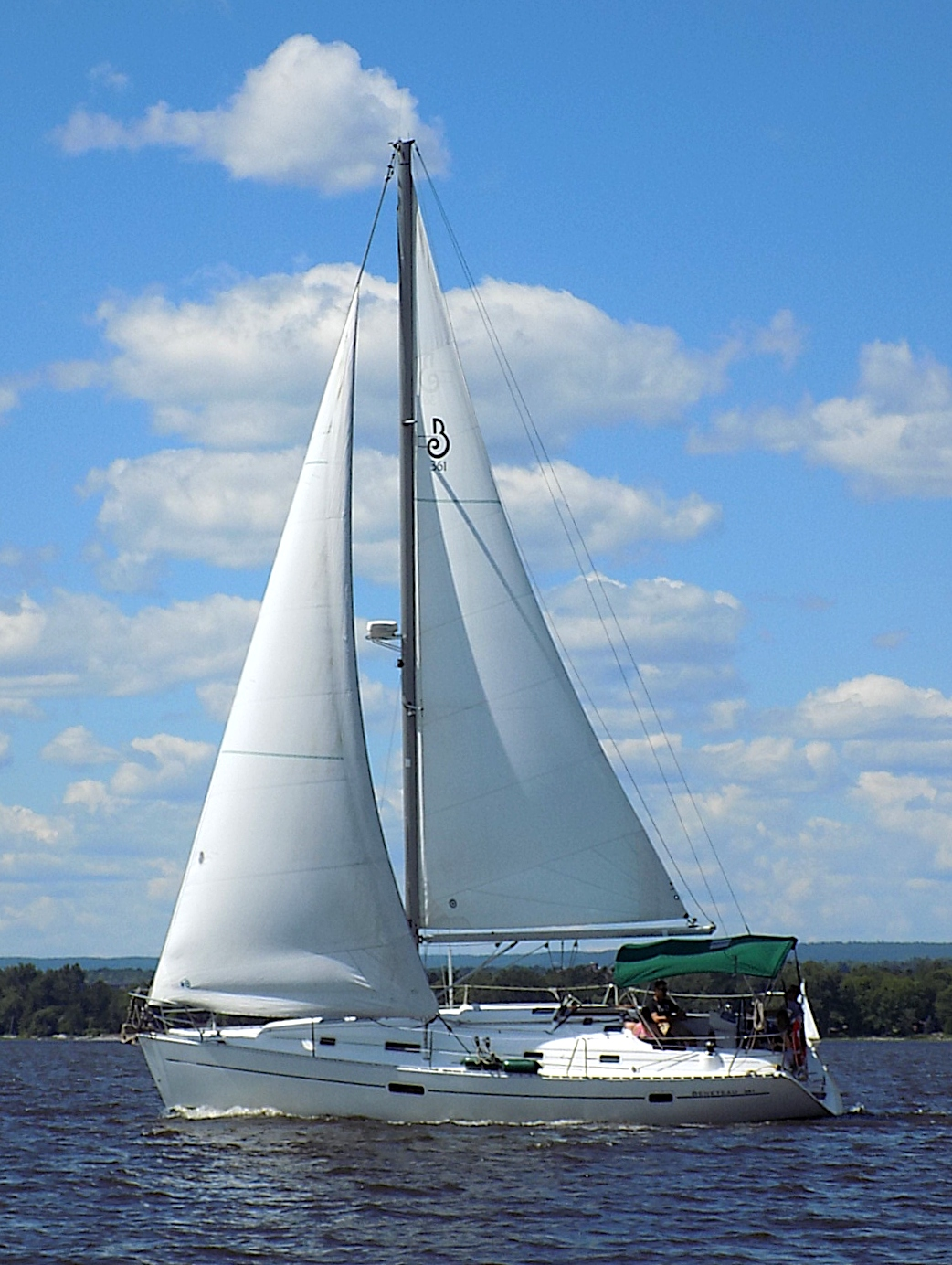
Beneteau 361

- Beneteau 31
- Beneteau 361
- Beneteau First 235
- Beneteau First 285
- Beneteau Oceanis 321
- Mumm 36
- Platu 25

== See also ==
- List of sailboat designers and manufacturers
- Jeanneau
- Lagoon
