= Pocket cruiser =

Term for a relatively small cruising boat

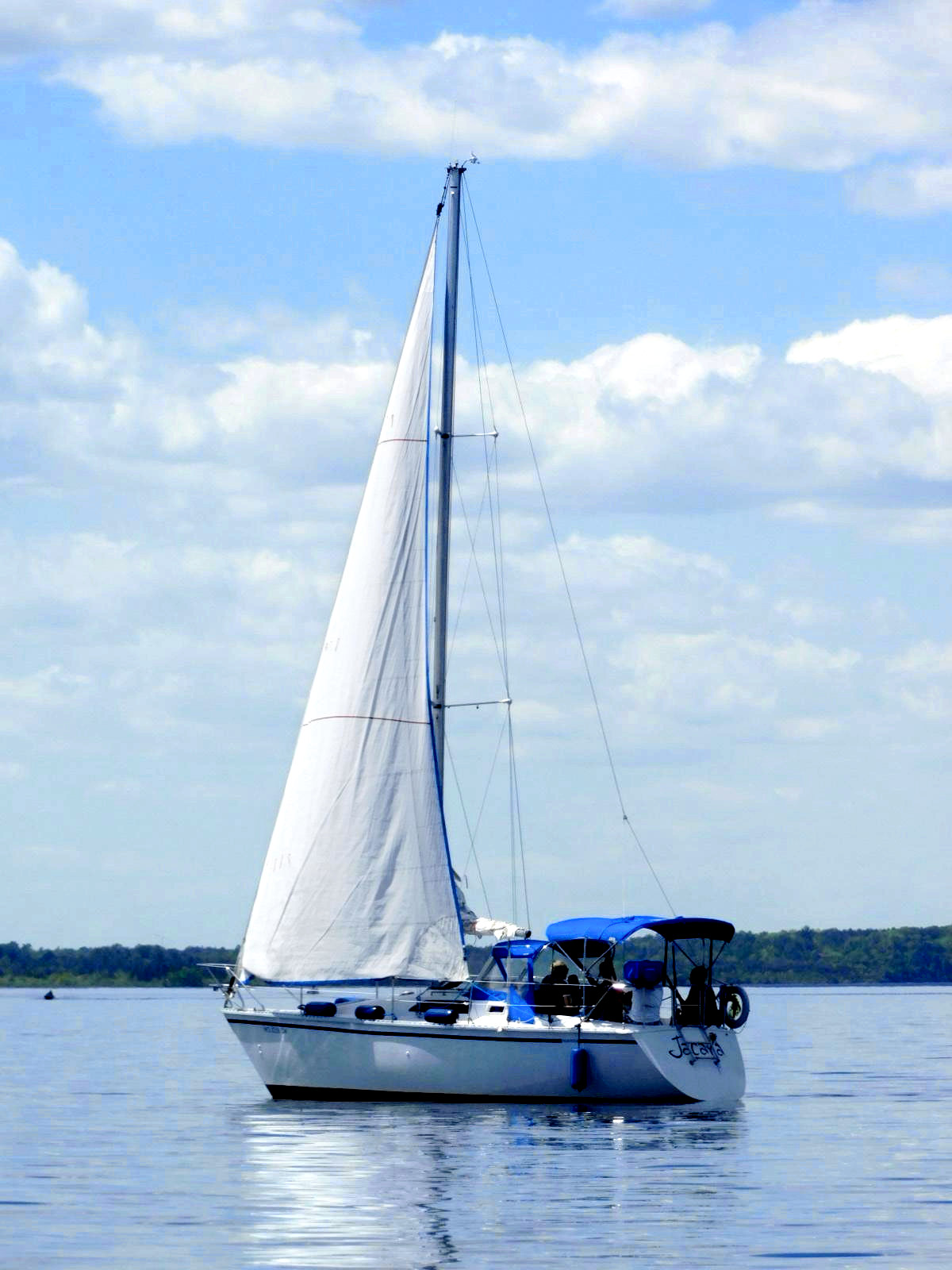
Hunter 28.5 sailboat

Pocket cruiser is a term for a relatively small recreational cruising boat. As a sailboat they have been defined as having a length of under 30 feet (9 m), or between 25 feet (8 m) and 35 feet (11 m). Pocket cabin cruisers (motorboats) can be under 30 feet (9 m) or under 50 feet (15 m). The term was coined in the 1970s, in the early days of fiberglass boat building.
