= Beneteau First 20 =

French sailboat class

Development
- Designer: Finot/Conq
- Location: France
- Year: 2011
- Builder: Beneteau
- Role: Cruiser-Racer
- Name: Beneteau First 20

Boat
- Displacement: 2,745 lb (1,245 kg)
- Draft: 5.91 ft (1.80 m) with centreboard down

Hull
- Type: monohull
- Construction: glassfibre
- LOA: 21.00 ft (6.40 m)
- LWL: 19.68 ft (6.00 m)
- Beam: 8.14 ft (2.48 m)
- Engine: outboard motor

Hull appendages
- Keel: Stub keel and centreboard
- Ballast: 661 lb (300 kg)
- Rudder: dual transom-mounted rudders

Rig
- Rig type: Bermuda rig
- I foretriangle height: 22.97 ft (7.00 m)
- J foretriangle base: 7.78 ft (2.37 m)
- P mainsail luff: 24.28 ft (7.40 m)
- E mainsail foot: 10.33 ft (3.15 m)

Sails
- Sailplan: Fractional rigged sloop
- Mainsail area: 170 sq ft (16 m^{2})
- Jib/genoa area: 75 sq ft (7.0 m^{2})
- Gennaker area: 265 sq ft (24.6 m^{2})
- Other sails: Code 0: 161 sq ft (15.0 m^{2})
- Upwind sail area: 245 sq ft (22.8 m^{2})
- Downwind sail area: 435 sq ft (40.4 m^{2})

The Beneteau First 20 is a French trailerable sailboat that was designed by Finot/Conq as a cruiser-racer and first built in 2011.

The boat is a development of the Beneteau First 210 and Beneteau First 211.

== Production ==
The design was built by Beneteau in France, from 2011 to 2018, but it is now out of production.

== Design ==
The First 20 is a recreational keelboat, built predominantly of glassfibre, with wood trim. The hull is solid fibreglass and the deck is balsa-cored. It has a fractional sloop rig with a square-top mainsail, roller furling jib, no backstay, a deck-stepped mast, one set of swept spreaders and aluminium spars with continuous 1X19 stainless steel wire standing rigging, plus a fibreglass bowsprit. There is no interior cabin mast post and instead the surrounding structure takes the mast compression load. The hull has a plumb stem; a vertical transom; dual, angled, transom-hung rudders controlled by a tiller and a fixed stub keel with a retractable centreboard. It displaces 2,745 lb (1,245 kg) empty and carries 661 lb (300 kg) of cast iron ballast.

The boat has a draft of 5.91 ft (1.80 m) with the centreboard extended and 2.30 ft (0.70 m) with it retracted, allowing operation in shallow water or ground transportation on a trailer.

The boat is normally fitted with a small 4 to 10 hp (3 to 7 kW) outboard motor for docking and maneuvering.

The design has sleeping accommodation for four people, with a double "V"-berth berth in the bow cabin and two quarter berths aft, under the cockpit sides. The galley is located on both sides just aft of bow cabin. The galley is equipped with a single-burner stove and a sink. Cabin headroom is 58 in (147 cm).

For sailing downwind the design may be equipped with an asymmetrical spinnaker of 265 sq ft (24.6 m^{2}) or a code 0 sail of 161 sq ft (15.0 m^{2}) flown from the bowsprit.

The design has a hull speed of 5.95 kn (11.02 km/h).

== Operational history ==
In a 2011 Cruising World review, Jen Brett wrote, "just shy of 21 feet, the Beneteau First 20 is the smallest boat in this builder’s lineup. But don't let the size fool you. The First series is the performance-sailing line from Beneteau USA, and like the First 20's larger siblings, this boat is designed for a good turn of speed. And going with the theory that the easier a boat is to sail, the more likely you are to do so, things have been kept simple."

A Boat Test review noted, "from our point of view, Beneteau's new First 20 is a breath of fresh air to hit the 'entry-level' sailboat market. She was designed by Finot Conq & Associates in France and her bottom shape and some of her attributes come right off the huge round-the-world racing boats the firm has designed."

A Sailing Magazine review indicated "the First 20 is different in that it's not a saucy-looking boat; it's a sweet-moving boat. Its modest freeboard, higher than a sport boat, keeps sailors dry and creates room in the cockpit for comfortable seats."

== See also ==
- List of sailing boat types
