= Beneteau Oceanis 35.1 =

Sailboat class

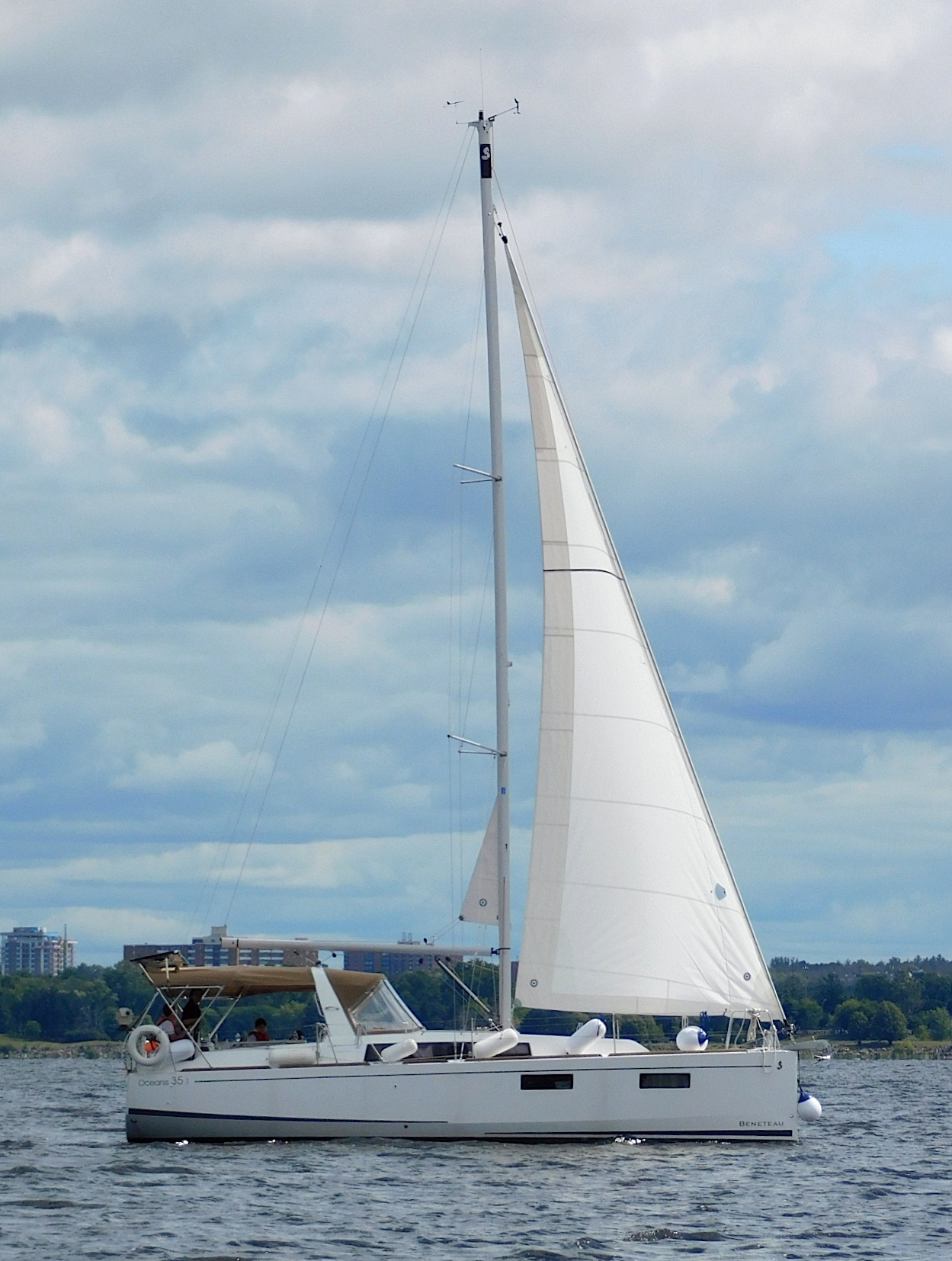

Development
- Designer: Group Finot/Conq/Nauta Design
- Location: France
- Year: 2017
- Builder: Beneteau
- Role: Cruiser
- Name: Beneteau Oceanis 35.1

Boat
- Displacement: 12,195 lb (5,532 kg)
- Draft: 6.08 ft (1.85 m) (deep draft keel)

Hull
- Type: monohull
- Construction: fiberglass
- LOA: 32.78 ft (9.99 m)
- LWL: 21.82 ft (6.65 m)
- Beam: 12.14 ft (3.70 m)
- Engine: diesel engine 30 hp (22 kW)

Hull appendages
- Keel: fin keel
- Ballast: 3,436 lb (1,559 kg)
- Rudder: dual internally-mounted spade-type rudders

Rig
- Rig type: Bermuda rig
- I foretriangle height: 40.83 ft (12.44 m)
- J foretriangle base: 14.08 ft (4.29 m)
- P mainsail luff: 40.00 ft (12.19 m)
- E mainsail foot: 12.83 ft (3.91 m)

Sails
- Sailplan: fractional rigged sloop
- Mainsail area: 297 sq ft (27.6 m^{2})
- Jib/genoa area: 288 sq ft (26.8 m^{2})
- Upwind sail area: 585 sq ft (54.3 m^{2})
- Downwind sail area: 1,195 sq ft (111.0 m^{2})

The Beneteau Oceanis 35.1 is a French sailboat that was designed by Group Finot/Conq, with an interior by Nauta Design, as a cruiser and first built in 2017.

The Beneteau Oceanis 35.1 is a development of the Beneteau Oceanis 35.

== Production ==
The design was built by Beneteau in France, starting in 2017, but by 2021 it was out of production.

== Design ==
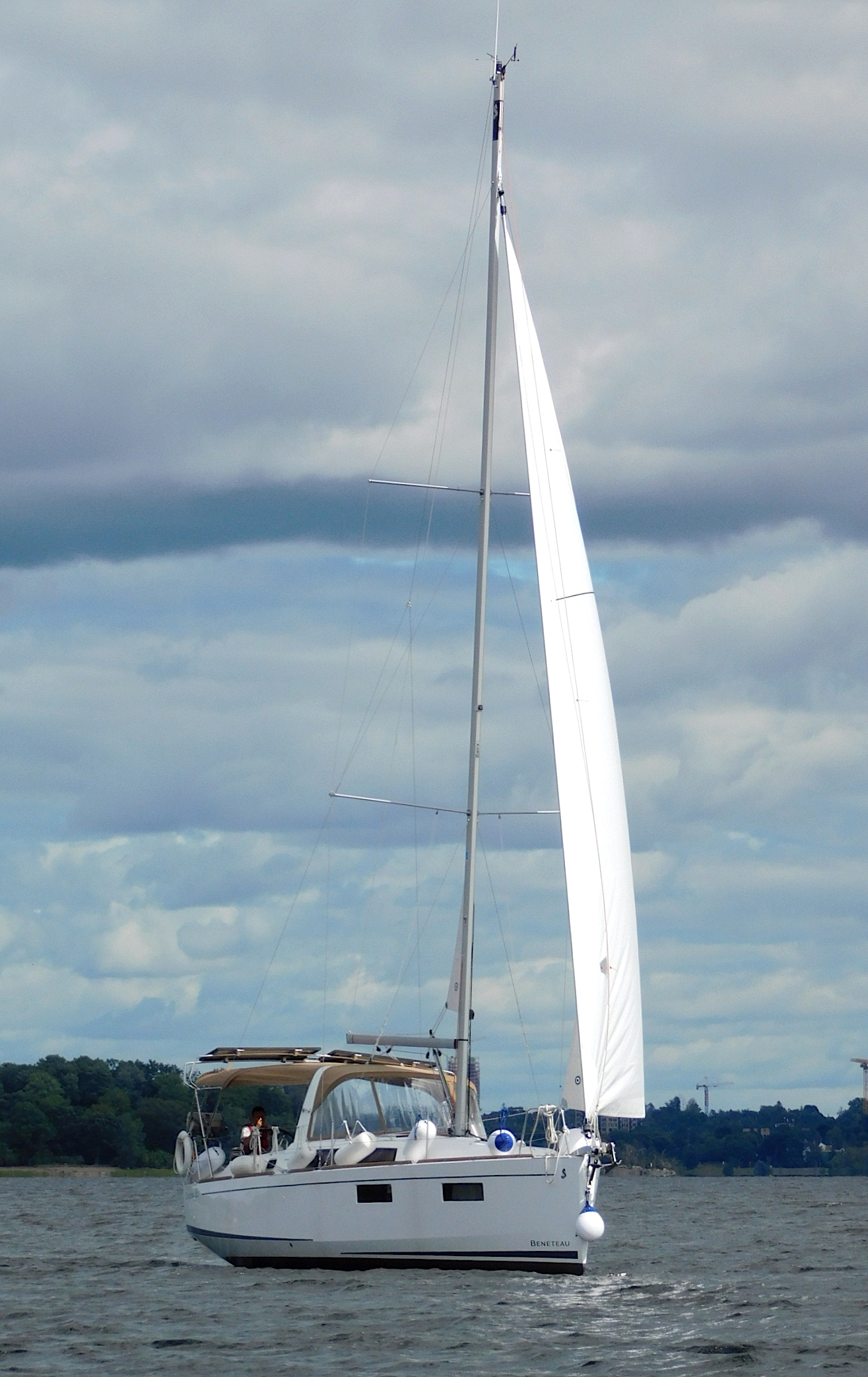
Beneteau Oceanis 35.1 sailing with genoa only

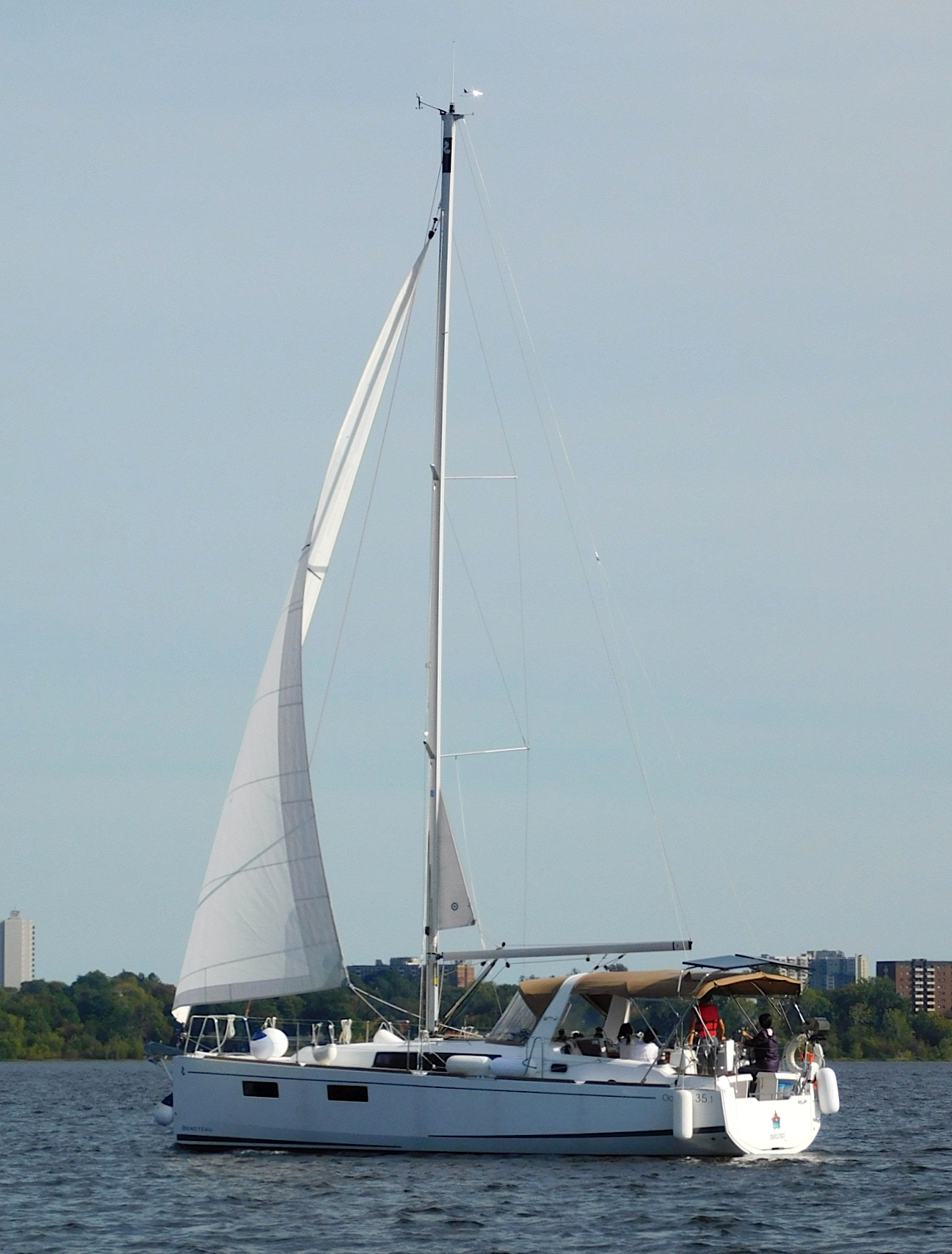
Beneteau Oceanis 35.1 showing transom with an optional fold down tailgate

The Oceanis 35.1 is a recreational keelboat, built predominantly of fiberglass and available in daysailer or cruising configurations. It has a fractional sloop rig, a plumb stem, a plum transom with an optional fold down tailgate, dual internally mounted spade-type rudders controlled by a wheel and a shallow or deep draft fixed fin keel or a stub keel with a centerboard. In cruiser configuration it displaces 12,195 lb (5,532 kg) and carries 3,436 lb (1,559 kg) of ballast, with the deep draft keel.

The shallow keel-equipped version of the boat has a draft of 4.75 ft (1.45 m), the deep keel-equipped version of the boat has a draft of 6.08 ft (1.85 m), while the stub keel and centerboard-equipped version has a draft of 7.58 ft (2.31 m) with the centerboard extended and 3.75 ft (1.14 m) with it retracted, allowing operation in shallow water.

The boat is fitted with an inboard diesel engine of 30 hp (22 kW) for docking and maneuvering. The fuel tank holds 34 U.S. gallons (130 L; 28 imp gal) and the fresh water tank has a capacity of 34 U.S. gallons (130 L; 28 imp gal), with 53 U.S. gallons (200 L; 44 imp gal) optional.

The design has sleeping accommodation for four to six people, depending on the interior design. All arrangements have a double "V"-berth in the bow cabin, combined with either one or two double-berth cabins aft. The galley may be located on either the port or starboard side and is equipped with a two-burner stove and a sink. In all arrangements the head is located just forward of the companionway ladder on the starboard side.

For downwind sailing the design may be equipped with an asymmetrical spinnaker of 898 sq ft (83.4 m^{2}).

The design has a hull speed of 7.56 kn (14.00 km/h).

== Operational history ==
In a review Boat Test wrote that the "Beneteau Oceanis 35.1 offers two-cabin and three-cabin arrangements, and a new L-shaped galley that will make cooking easier and safer underway. Her large cockpit proves equally useful for daysailing, cruising, club racing, or entertaining on the hook. An optional fold-out transom makes for easy boarding from the dock, a convenient step into a dinghy for a night ashore, or an ideal snorkeling platform. Twin rudders and wheels are handy in a boat that carries her wide beam well aft."

== See also ==
- List of sailing boat types
