= Beneteau 423 =

Sailboat class

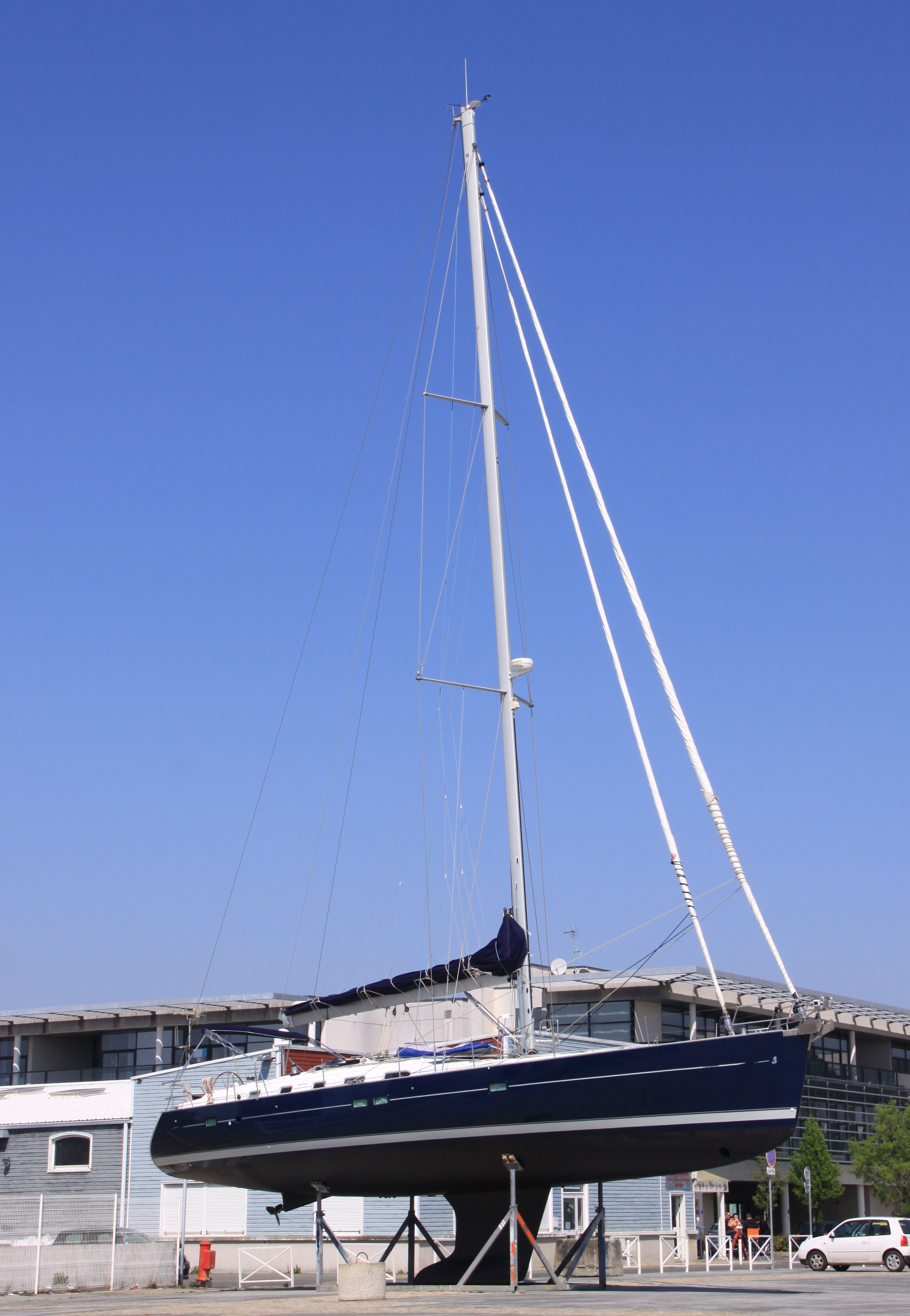

Development
- Designer: Groupe Finot
- Location: France
- Year: 2002
- Builder: Beneteau
- Role: Cruiser
- Name: Beneteau 423

Boat
- Displacement: 19,500 lb (8,845 kg)
- Draft: 5.58 ft (1.70 m)

Hull
- Type: monohull
- Construction: glassfibre
- LOA: 43.14 ft (13.15 m)
- LWL: 38.55 ft (11.75 m)
- Beam: 12.93 ft (3.94 m)
- Engine: Volvo 80 hp (60 kW) diesel engine

Hull appendages
- Keel: Fin keel
- Ballast: 5,836 lb (2,647 kg)
- Rudder: Skeg-mounted/Spade-type/Transom-mounted rudder

Rig
- Rig type: Bermuda rig

Sails
- Sailplan: Masthead sloop
- Total sail area: 860.00 sq ft (79.897 m^{2})

Racing
- PHRF: 93-132

The Beneteau 423, also called the Oceanis 423, is a French sailboat that was designed by Groupe Finot as a cruiser and first built in 2002. With a list of optional equipment as standard it is called the Oceanis Clipper 423.

The design replaced the Oceanis 411 in production.

== Production ==
The design was built by Beneteau in France and in Marion, South Carolina, United States, starting in 2002, but it is now out of production.

== Design ==
The Beneteau 423 is a recreational keelboat, built predominantly of glassfibre, with wood trim. The hull is hand-laid solid fibreglass and the deck is balsa-cored. It has a masthead sloop rig, with a deck-stepped mast, two sets of swept spreaders and aluminium spars. The hull has a raked stem, a walk-through reverse transom with a swimming platform, an internally mounted spade-type rudder controlled by a wheel and a fixed fin keel or optional shoal draft or deep draft keel. It displaces 19,500 lb (8,845 kg) and carries 5,836 lb (2,647 kg) of ballast.

The boat has a draft of 5.58 ft (1.70 m) with the standard keel, 4.76 ft (1.45 m) with the optional shoal draft keel and 6.89 ft (2.10 m) with the optional deep draft keel.

The boat is fitted with a Swedish Volvo diesel engine of 80 hp (60 kW) for docking and manoeuvring. The fuel tank holds 53 U.S. gallons (200 L; 44 imp gal) and the fresh water tank has a capacity of 154 U.S. gallons (580 L; 128 imp gal).

The design has sleeping accommodation for four to six people with two and three cabin interiors. The two cabin arrangement has a double "V"-berth in the bow cabin, a U-shaped settee and a straight settee in the main salon and an aft cabin with a transverse double berth on the port side. The galley is located on the starboard side at the companionway ladder. The galley is U-shaped and is equipped with a three-burner stove, a refrigerator, freezer and a double sink. A navigation station is opposite the galley, on the port side. There are two heads, one in the bow cabin on the starboard side and one on the port side aft. The three cabin interior adds a second aft cabin to starboard and moves the galley into the main salon for access. Cabin headroom is 77 in (196 cm).

The design has a hull speed of 8.32 kn (15.41 km/h) and a PHRF handicap of 93 to 132 for the standard keel model and 114 to 138 for the shoal draft model.

== Operational history ==
In a 2009 review, Yachting Monthly reported, "under sail, her performance is an improvement on the rather sedate 411, but still steady as opposed to remarkable. Nonetheless, she is easy on the helm, well-balanced and stiff, and her sails are easily handled by large winches. Under power she handles easily, although poor soundproofing means high noise levels, especially down below."

In a 2003 Cruising World review, Jeremy McGeary wrote, "disguising the outside appearance of copious volume is an art in itself, and here Groupe Finot, the designer of the Beneteau 423, demonstrates its finesse by masking the boat's generous freeboard. The long waterline and boot top painted high on the hull help, and so too does a well-placed cove line, especially when it's broken by hull ports. But it’s the cabin trunk that’s the saving grace. It has a line that’s interesting enough that it draws the eye away from the topsides. All in all, Finot has tackled the looks of this model in style."

In a 2003 Sail Magazine review noted, "the 423's considerable beam is carried well aft and allows for a wide cockpit; seats are teak trimmed, the coamings are tall enough and angled outboard for comfort, and the walk-through transom makes it easy to board the boat from a dinghy. The deck layout is efficient. Under sail the boat settled into a comfortable groove, was light and responsive to steer, and cut a smooth wake in the light winds of our test. With its smooth helm, surprisingly nimble hull, and attractive features, the 423 successfully offers more for less."

== See also ==
- List of sailing boat types
