= Beneteau 473 =

Sailboat class

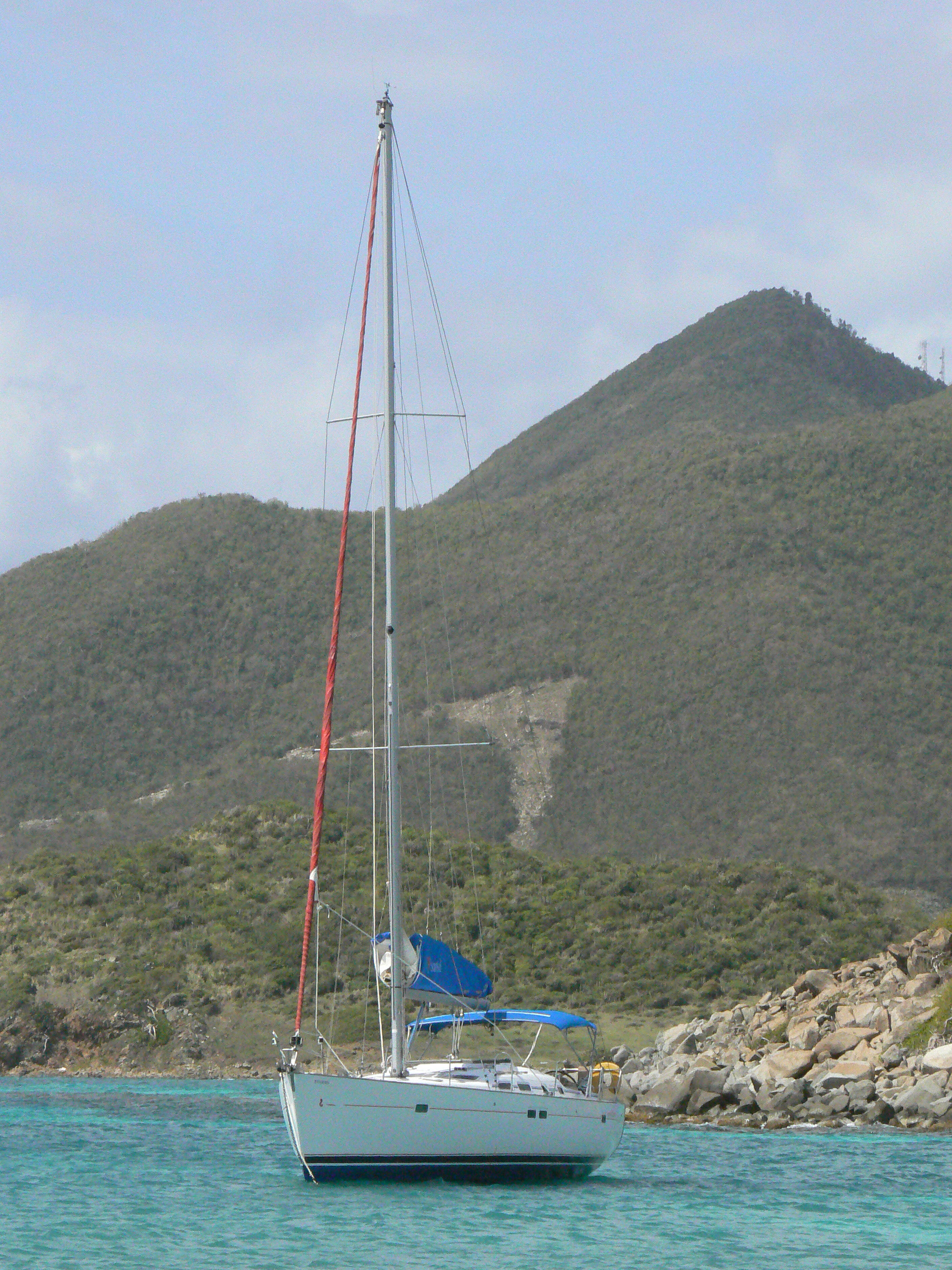

Development
- Designer: Groupe Finot
- Location: France
- Year: 2000
- No. built: 400 (by end of 2002)
- Builder: Beneteau
- Role: Cruiser
- Name: Beneteau 473

Boat
- Displacement: 24,277 lb (11,012 kg)
- Draft: 5.58 ft (1.70 m)

Hull
- Type: monohull
- Construction: glassfibre
- LOA: 46.92 ft (14.30 m)
- LWL: 43.83 ft (13.36 m)
- Beam: 14.16 ft (4.32 m)
- Engine: Westerbeke 63 hp (47 kW) diesel engine

Hull appendages
- Keel: Fin keel
- Ballast: 8,157 lb (3,700 kg)
- Rudder: Spade-type rudder

Rig
- Rig type: Bermuda rig
- I foretriangle height: 55.43 ft (16.90 m)
- J foretriangle base: 18.21 ft (5.55 m)
- P mainsail luff: 48.03 ft (14.64 m)
- E mainsail foot: 17.06 ft (5.20 m)

Sails
- Sailplan: Masthead sloop
- Mainsail area: 409.70 sq ft (38.062 m^{2})
- Jib/genoa area: 504.69 sq ft (46.887 m^{2})
- Total sail area: 914.39 sq ft (84.950 m^{2})

Racing
- PHRF: 72-96

The Beneteau 473, also sold as the Oceanis 473, is a French sailboat that was designed by Groupe Finot as a cruiser and first built in 2000. It was widely used by yacht charter operators.

The design was named Cruising World magazine's Best Production Cruiser (Over $200,000) for 2001.

== Production ==
The design was built from 2000 to 2005 by Beneteau in France and also at their American plant in Marion, South Carolina after 2001. A total of 200 boats were built in the first two years of production, by the end of 2002, but it is now out of production.

== Design ==
The Beneteau 473 is a recreational keelboat, built predominantly of glassfibre, with wood trim. The hull is solid fibreglass and the deck is balsa-cored. It has a masthead sloop rig, a keel-stepped mast with two sets of swept spreaders and aluminium spars with stainless steel wire standing rigging. The hull has a raked stem, a reverse transom with a swimming platform, an internally mounted spade-type rudder controlled by dual wheels and a fixed fin keel with a weighted bulb or optional deep draft keel. It displaces 24,277 lb (11,012 kg) and carries 8,157 lb (3,700 kg) of cast iron ballast or 7,275 lb (3,300 kg) of ballast in the deep draft model.

The boat has a draft of 5.58 ft (1.70 m) with the standard keel and 6.92 ft (2.11 m) with the optional deep draft keel.

The boat was built with engines of 55 to 78 hp (41 to 58 kW), but typical was a Westerbeke diesel engine of 63 hp (47 kW) for docking and manoeuvring. The fuel tank holds 57 U.S. gallons (220 L; 47 imp gal) and the fresh water tank has a capacity of 222 U.S. gallons (840 L; 185 imp gal).

The design was built with two, three and four cabin interiors, providing sleeping accommodation for four to eight people. The two cabin layout has a double "V"-berth in the bow cabin, a U-shaped settee and a straight settee in the main salon and an aft cabin with a transverse double berth on the port side. The three cabin interior adds a second aft cabin, while the four cabin arrangement divides the bow cabin in two. The galley is located on the starboard side, at the companionway ladder. The galley is L-shaped and is equipped with a four-burner stove, a refrigerator, freezer and a double sink. On the four cabin interior the galley is located in the main salon, in place of the straight settee. A navigation station is opposite the galley, on the starboard side. All interior layouts have two heads.

For sailing downwind the design may be equipped with a symmetrical cruising spinnaker.

The design has a hull speed of 8.87 kn (16.43 km/h) and a PHRF handicap of 72 to 96 with the standard keel and 63 to 90 with the deep draft keel.

== Operational history ==
In a 2002 Yachting World review, Matthew Sheahan wrote, "To deal with the negatives first, she has a heavy helm which at times lacks the kind of feel you might expect on a boat of this size. The reason seems to lie in the twin wheel arrangement, which adds friction to the system. Having said that, you quickly get used to her slightly dulled feel and as the speed increases this is less of an issue. And to my surprise, that was it on the debit side."

In a review for YachtWorld, Zuzana Prochazka noted, "the 473 is a notable model that's much desired by cruisers who want performance, oodles of room, and a good value."

== See also ==
- List of sailing boat types
