= Beneteau 34 =

Sailboat class

Development
- Designer: Finot/Conq
- Location: France
- Year: 2008
- Builder: Beneteau
- Role: Cruiser
- Name: Beneteau 34

Boat
- Displacement: 12,566 lb (5,700 kg)
- Draft: 6.08 ft (1.85 m)

Hull
- Type: monohull
- Construction: glassfibre
- LOA: 33.92 ft (10.34 m)
- LWL: 30.67 ft (9.35 m)
- Beam: 12.00 ft (3.66 m)
- Engine: Yanmar 29 hp (22 kW) diesel engine

Hull appendages
- Keel: Fin keel with weighted bulb
- Ballast: 3,208 lb (1,455 kg)
- Rudder: Spade-type rudder

Rig
- Rig type: Bermuda rig
- I foretriangle height: 42.25 ft (12.88 m)
- J foretriangle base: 13.67 ft (4.17 m)
- P mainsail luff: 39.67 ft (12.09 m)
- E mainsail foot: 12.75 ft (3.89 m)

Sails
- Sailplan: 9/10 Fractional rigged sloop
- Mainsail area: 252.90 sq ft (23.495 m^{2})
- Jib/genoa area: 288.78 sq ft (26.829 m^{2})
- Total sail area: 541.68 sq ft (50.324 m^{2})

Racing
- PHRF: 147-150

The Beneteau 34 is a French-designed sailboat, that was manufactured in the United States. It was designed by Finot/Conq as a cruiser and first built in 2008. The interior was designed by Nauta Design.

The boat was named "Best Value Cruiser for 2009" by Cruising World magazine.

The design is very similar to the Oceanis 34, which was also built starting in 2008, in France.

== Production ==
The design was built by Beneteau in Marion, South Carolina, United States, starting in 2008, but it is now out of production.

== Design ==
The Beneteau 34 is a recreational keelboat, built predominantly of glassfibre, with wood trim and a balsa-cored deck. It has a 9/10 fractional sloop rig, with a deck-stepped mast, one set of swept spreaders and aluminium spars with stainless steel wire standing rigging. The hull has a nearly plumb stem, a reverse transom with a swimming platform, an internally mounted spade-type rudder controlled by a wheel and a fixed fin keel with a weighted bulb or optional shoal-draft keel. It displaces 12,566 lb (5,700 kg) and carries 3,208 lb (1,455 kg) of iron ballast in the fin keel version and 3,556 lb (1,613 kg) for the shoal draft model.

The boat has a draft of 6.08 ft (1.85 m) with the standard keel and 4.5 ft (1.4 m) with the optional shoal draft keel.

The boat is fitted with a Japanese Yanmar diesel engine of 29 hp (22 kW) for docking and manoeuvring. The fuel tank holds 34 U.S. gallons (130 L; 28 imp gal) and the fresh water tank has a capacity of 83 U.S. gallons (310 L; 69 imp gal).

The design has sleeping accommodation for four people, with a double "V"-berth berth in the bow cabin, a U-shaped settee and a straight settee in the main cabin and an aft cabin with a transverse double berth on the port side. The galley is located on the port side at the companionway ladder. The galley is L-shaped and is equipped with a two-burner stove, an ice box and a double sink. A navigation station is opposite the galley, on the starboard side. The head is located aft on the starboard side and includes a shower.

The design has a hull speed of 7.42 kn (13.74 km/h) and a PHRF handicap of 147 to 150 for the fin keel model and 156 for the shoal draft model.

== Operational history ==
In a 2008 Cruising World review, Jeremy McGeary noted, "the wide T-shaped cockpit makes full use of the boat's beam and allows access around the steering wheel to the stern porch/swim platform/dinghy dock that’s become standard issue. The rig, with a 105-percent fractional-hoist jib that sheets inboard courtesy of swept-back spreaders and outboard-mounted chainplates, promises the utmost ease of handling."

In a 2009 review for Cruising World, Andrew Burton wrote, "the featherlight feel of the large, leather-covered wheel in no way reflected the Beneteau 34's relatively moderate displacement as we danced to weather on a blustery day on Narragansett Bay. Overcanvased under full sail, we heeled when the breeze was on, but not too far. The 6-foot-deep cast-iron keel and bulb kept the center of gravity low, and the fairly hard turn to the bilge provided form stability; together, they conspired to keep the Beneteau 34 on its feet. Dropping the cabin-top traveler took care of any inclination for the boat to round up in the 20-knot puffs. The 34 pointed well and easily made 6 knots on the wind. That jumped to around 7 when we eased sheets and bore off."

== See also ==
- List of sailing boat types
