= Passatore =

Model of laminated wood racing sailboat

Development
- Designer: Jean-Marie Finot
- Year: 1971-1982
- No. built: 136
- Builder: Sartini Shipyards

Boat
- Displacement: 2,500 kg
- Draft: 1.65 m

Hull
- Type: monohull
- Construction: laminated wood
- LOA: 8.55 m (28.1 ft)
- LWL: 6.30 m
- Beam: 3.05 m (10.0 ft)

Sails
- Total sail area: 32.2 sqm

The Passatore is a cruiser-racer sailboat model designed in the late 1960s by the French naval architect Jean-Marie Finot and built in Italy between 1971 and 1982 by the Sartini Shipyards in Cervia.

Constructed entirely of laminated wood, the Passatore was one of the first Italian models produced in series using a technique based on preformed half-shells.

The boat’s name is inspired by the historical figure of the Italian bandit Stefano Pelloni, known as “Il Passatore” (the ferryman).

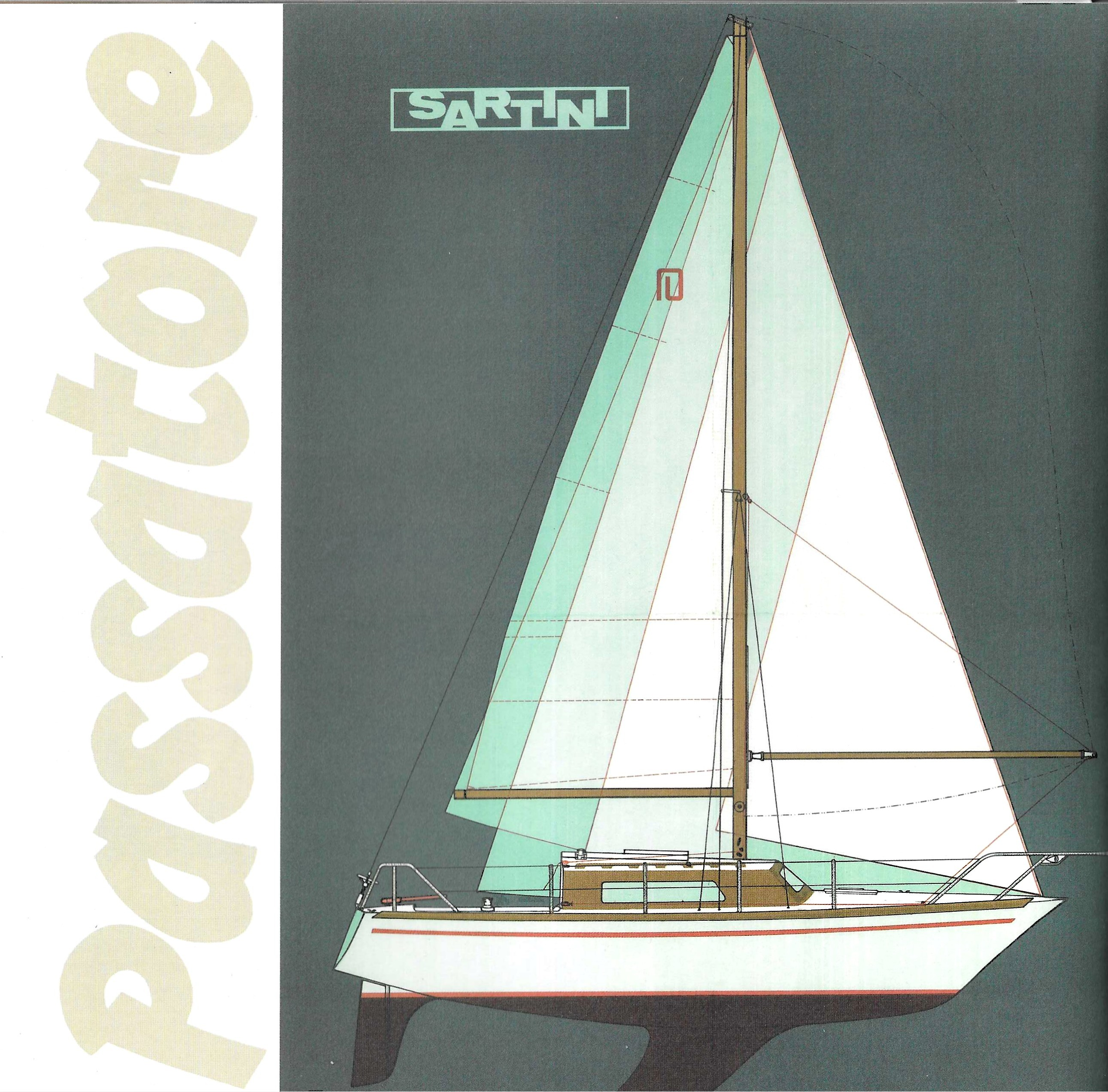
Original Passatore leaflet - Sartini Shipyards.

== History ==
The Passatore project originated from an initiative of the Sartini Shipyards in Cervia, which were already engaged in the licensed production of French models such as the Muscadet and Corsaire, both designed by Philippe Harlé. The commission for a new model was assigned to the Finot maritime engineering firm, then an emerging name in the international yacht design scene.

The prototype was built between 1970 and 1971 and previewed at the Settimana Velica di Genova (Genoa Sailing Week) in March of the same year. The boat, completed at the last moment at the Yacht Club Italiano - organiser of the event - participated in the regatta without prior sea trials and won, even beating several higher-class boats in real time.

The crew consisted of young sailors who would later distinguish themselves in the sport of sailing, including Cino Ricci, Uccio Ventimiglia, Laurent Cordelle, and Ellero Tamburini.

Following the debut, the project underwent several modifications: the overall length was increased from 8.35 to 8.55 metres, moving from the Sixth to the Fifth IOR class, and the transom shape was redesigned from a double chine to a rounded profile.

The third unit, named Bandito, was the first to feature the definitive hull configuration and was presented at the Genoa International Boat Show in 1972. Bandito competed in several sailing races across Europe (Italy, France, Spain, Sweden) under the command of Laurent Cordelle, achieving good results and helping to spread and establish the model internationally.

The success of the design led to increased production: the Sartini Shipyards adopted a serial production system that made it possible to build several dozen units per year. Between 1971 and 1982, a total of 136 wooden boats were built.

In subsequent years, about 30 examples were also built in Japan in fibreglass, following the same design.

== Construction ==
The construction of the Passatore at the Sartini Shipyards followed a process based on semi-industrial series production from pre-fabricated components.

The hull was assembled from two preformed half-shells, a solution that differed from traditional standards of the time, which generally started from the load-bearing framework followed by the planking.

The half-shells were made of Rexilon - a laminated kaya mahogany - at the Simpress workshop in Lissone. The veneers were laid in alternating 45° cross-grain layers and bonded with phenolic resins, then hot-pressed in a mould to achieve the desired shape.

Each half-shell, weighing about 400 kg and 12 mm thick, was transported to Cervia, where it was joined to the keelson and the transom frame. Once the hull was completed, internal structural elements such as frames, floors, stringers, bulkheads, and deck beams were installed, followed by the interior fittings, also made of mahogany (solid or plywood).

Painting took place in a dedicated workshop, and the hull colour was chosen by the client. The first unit was painted green, an unusual choice in the nautical world due to traditional superstitions.

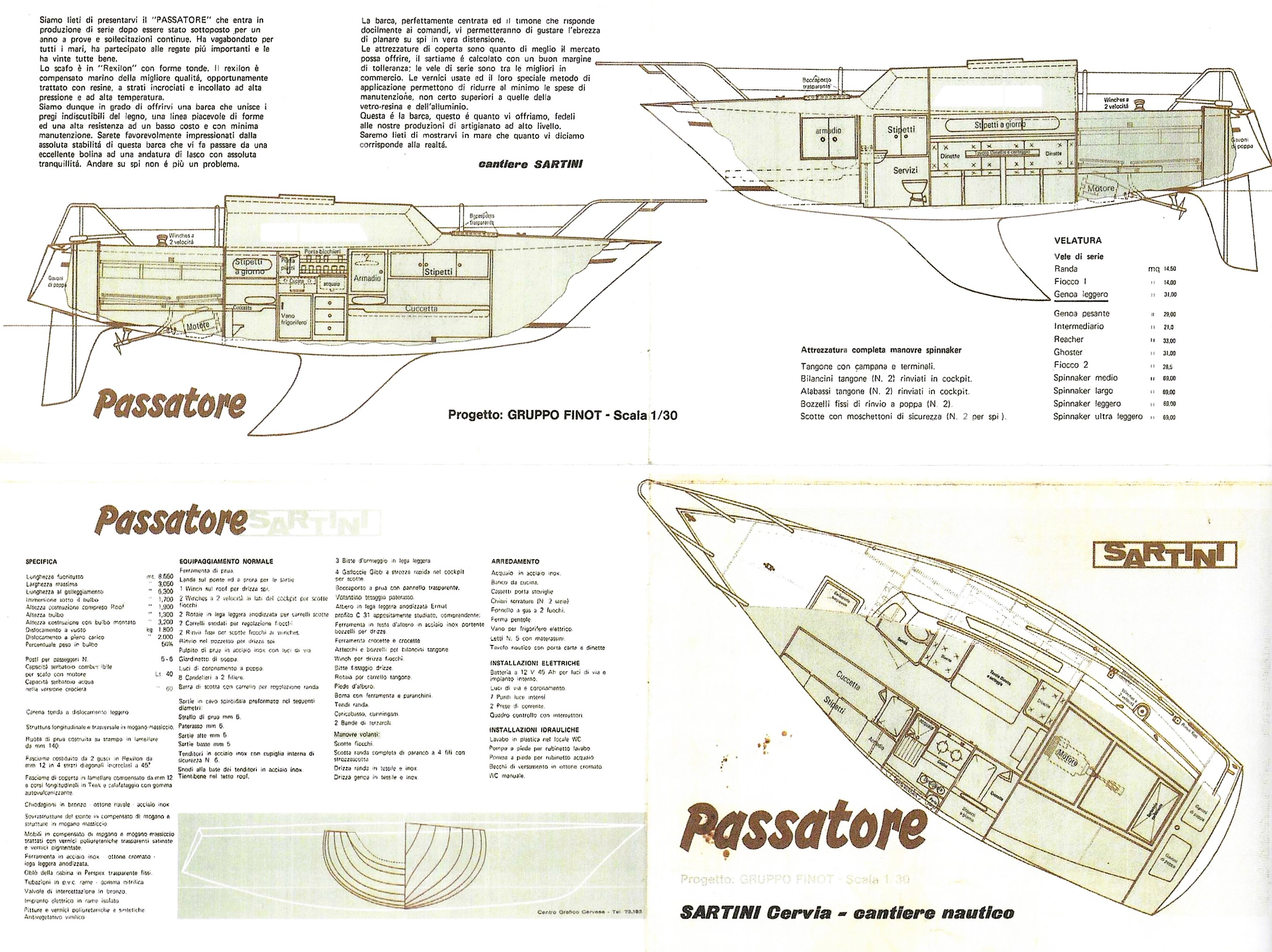
Original brochure of the Passatore model - Sartini shipyards.

Final outfitting occurred in the shipyard building at the Cervia harbour, where portholes, hatches, electrical systems, deck hardware, and the keel (cast iron, with a lead core in some racing models) were installed. Standard equipment included a two-burner stove, refrigerator, toilet, and a 10 HP inboard diesel engine.

Each boat exhibited slight differences, resulting from both owner requests and progressive technical improvements made by the shipyard to enhance functionality and habitability. Starting from hull no. 63, for instance, a new load-bearing structure with enlarged bulkheads replaced the traditional frame system, while racing models retained the original frame configuration, simplified interiors, and a taller mast.

Some examples feature unique configurations, including four units with flush decks and a single racing unit built with the reinforced bulkhead structure, hull no. 74.

== Technical Specifications ==
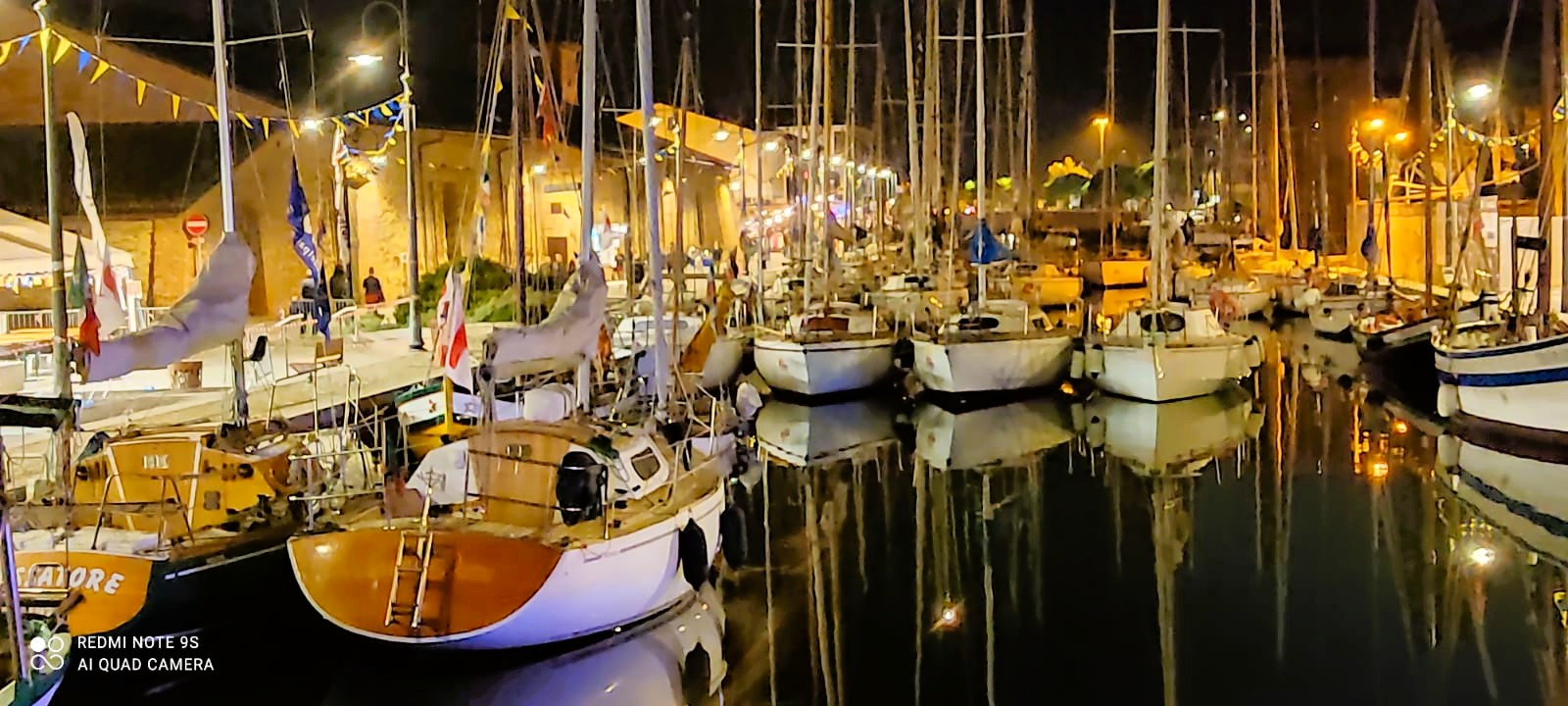
Passatore boats lined up in Cervia harbour.

In the definitive design, adopted from the third unit onwards, the Passatore has the following standard characteristics:

Specification	Value
Overall length	8.55 m
Beam	3.05 m
Draft	1.65 m
Displacement	2,500 kg
Sail area	32.2 m²

The wide transom - characteristic of Finot’s boats - and the high freeboard contribute to the vessel’s overall stability.

The Passatore is typically equipped with additional headsails for downwind courses, such as the spinnaker.

== The Congrega del Passatore ==
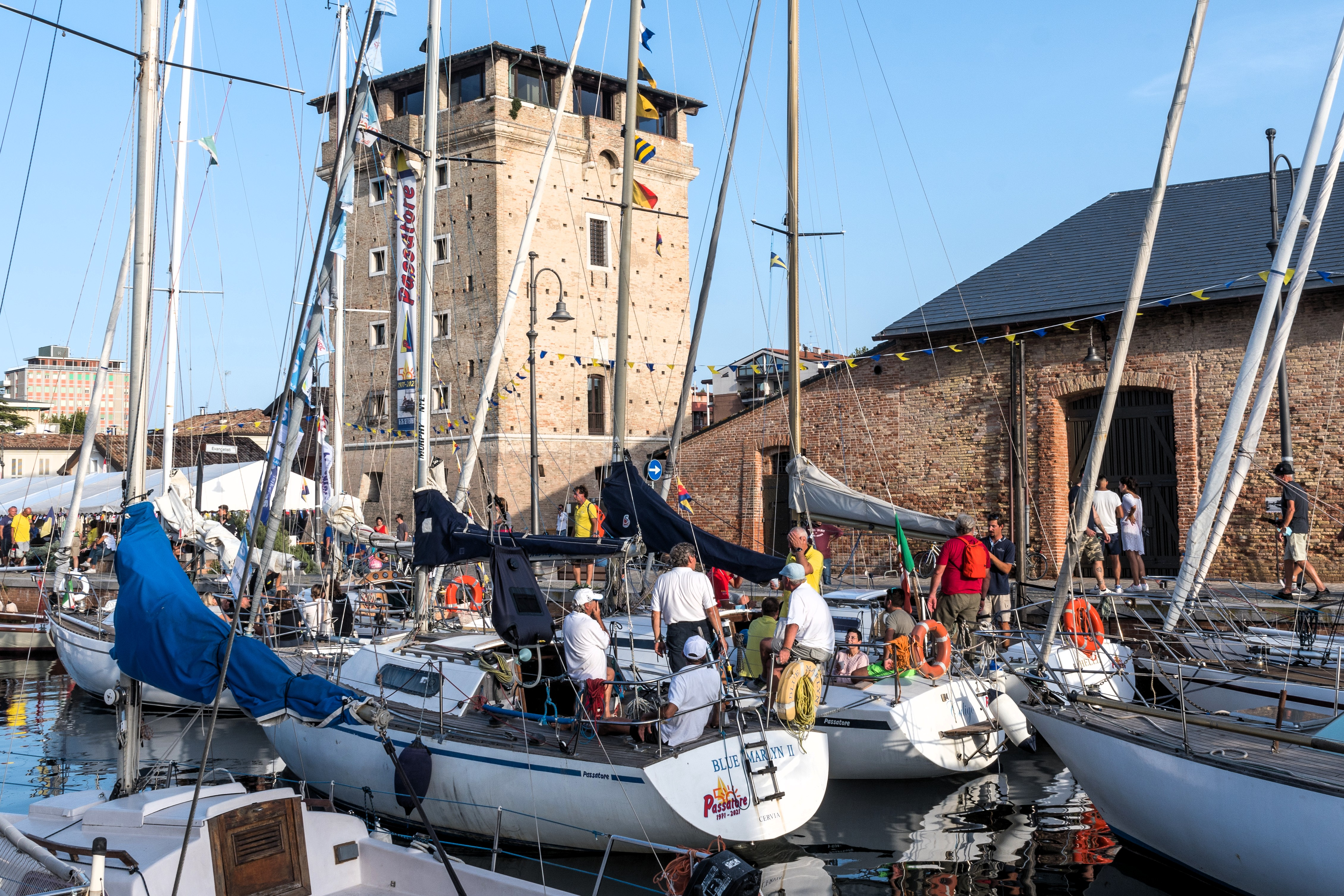
"Passatore 50": celebrations for the fiftieth anniversary of the launch of the first Passatore.

In 1993, the sports association Congrega del Passatore was founded in Cervia. The association brings together owners and enthusiasts of the Passatore and promotes activities related to sailing, the preservation of maritime heritage, and the historical and cultural appreciation of the model.

The Congrega del Passatore is active in organising regattas, rallies, group cruises, and charitable events. Among its main goals are the promotion of sportsmanship, conviviality, and maritime culture. Its activities are carried out in collaboration with schools, cooperatives, and civil institutions, involving both Passatore boats around the world and other similar vessels.

== Present Day ==
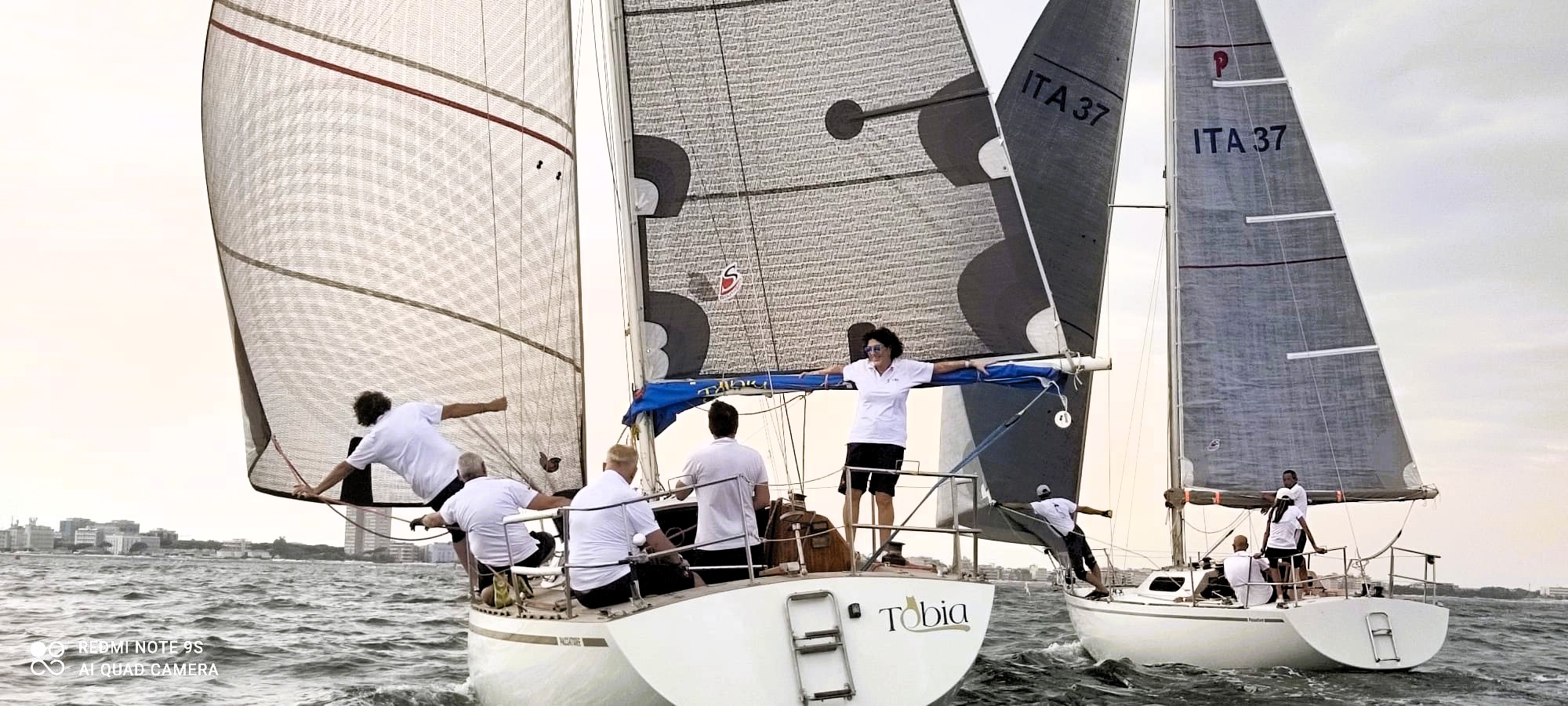
Two goosewinged Passatore boats.

A large number of Passatore boats remain seaworthy today. Many continue to compete successfully in regattas, rallies, and sailing events, including international ones.

In 2007, the Passatore was officially recognised as a “boat of historical interest” by the Municipality of Cervia.

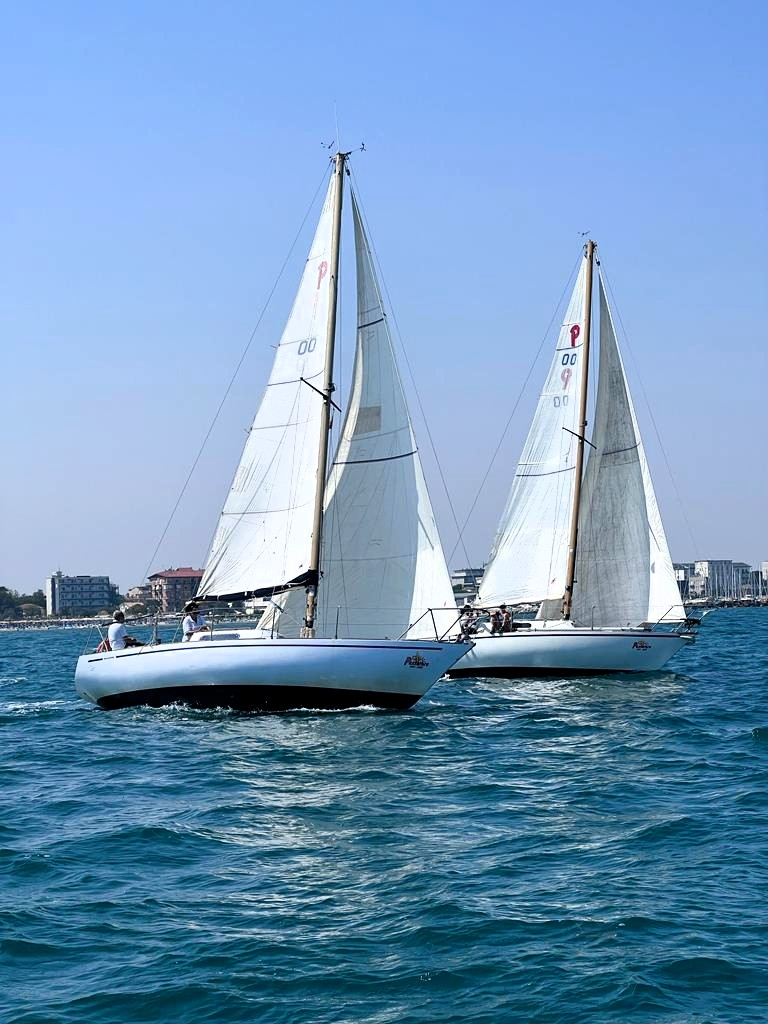
Two overlapped Passatore boats.

All Passatore boats can be identified by a progressive construction number, from 1 to 136 (for the round-hull models). The first two chine-hull prototypes are identified as nos. 01 and 02, while the round-hull prototype Bandito does not have a construction number.
