= Beneteau 42 CC =

Sailboat class

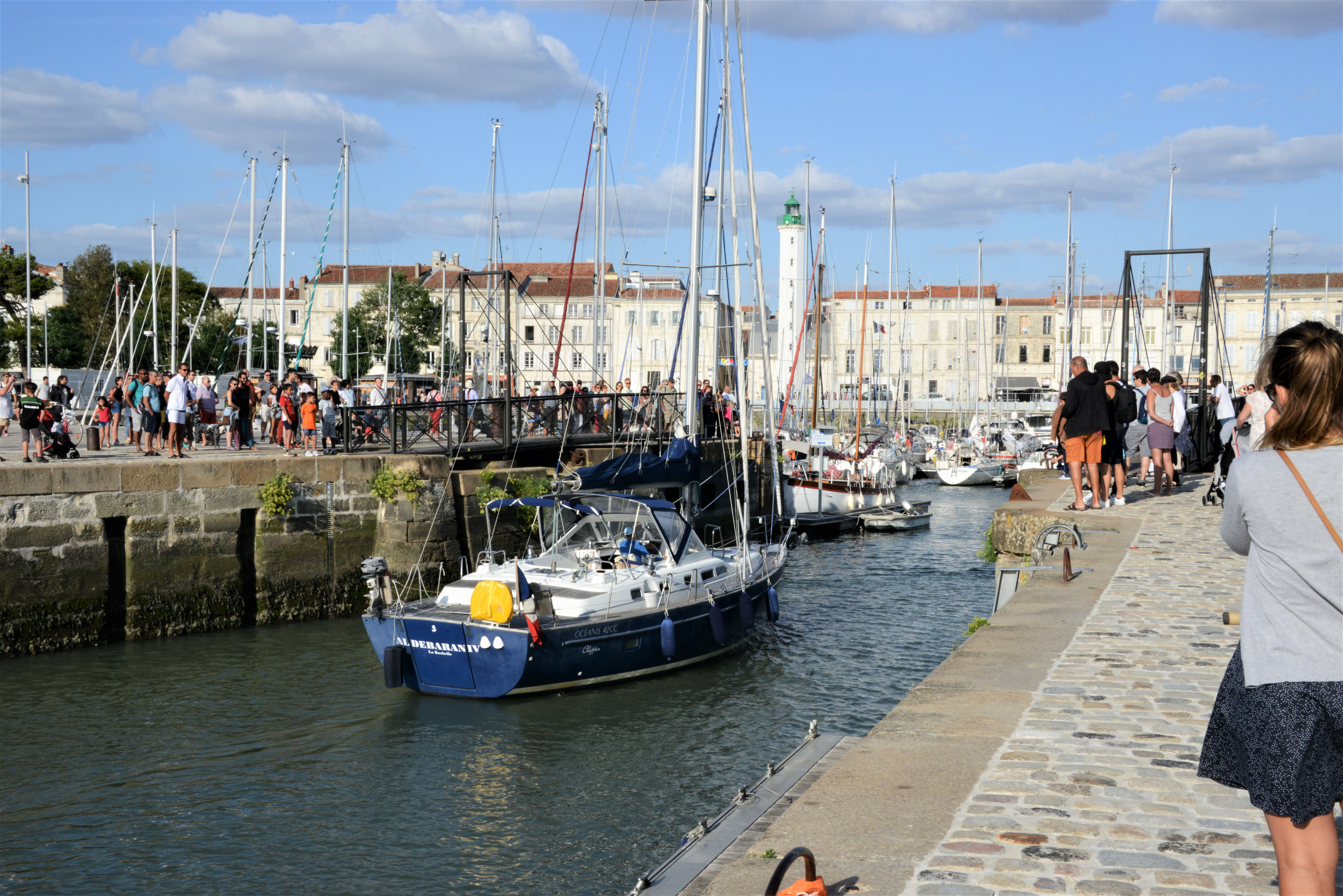

Development
- Designer: Groupe Finot
- Location: France
- Year: 2003
- Builder: Beneteau
- Role: Cruiser
- Name: Beneteau 42 CC

Boat
- Displacement: 19,845 lb (9,002 kg)
- Draft: 5.92 ft (1.80 m)

Hull
- Type: monohull
- Construction: glassfibre
- LOA: 43.42 ft (13.23 m)
- LWL: 36.33 ft (11.07 m)
- Beam: 12.83 ft (3.91 m)
- Engine: Volvo 55 hp (41 kW) diesel engine

Hull appendages
- Keel: Wing keel
- Ballast: 5,556 lb (2,520 kg)
- Rudder: Spade-type rudder

Rig
- Rig type: Bermuda rig

Sails
- Sailplan: Cutter
- Total sail area: 878 sq ft (81.6 m^{2})

Racing
- PHRF: 126

The Beneteau 42 CC (Centre Cockpit), also sold as the Oceanis 42 CC, is a French sailboat that was designed by Groupe Finot as a cruiser and first built in 2003. The boat design proved popular in the yacht charter market.

== Production ==
The design was built by Beneteau in France, from 2003 until 2007, but it is now out of production.

== Design ==
The Beneteau 42 CC is a recreational keelboat, built predominantly of glassfibre, with wood trim. It has a cutter rig, with two sets of swept spreaders and aluminium spars with stainless steel wire standing rigging. The hull has a raked stem, an angled transom with a drop-down tailgate swimming platform, an internally mounted spade-type rudder controlled by a wheel in the centre cockpit and a fixed wing keel. It displaces 19,845 lb (9,002 kg) and carries 5,556 lb (2,520 kg) of ballast.

The boat has a draft of 5.92 ft (1.80 m) with the standard wing keel.

The boat is fitted with a Swedish Volvo diesel engine of 55 hp (41 kW) for docking and manoeuvring. The fuel tank holds 63 U.S. gallons (240 L; 52 imp gal) and the fresh water tank has a capacity of 154 U.S. gallons (580 L; 128 imp gal).

The design has sleeping accommodation for four people, with a double berth in the bow cabin, a U-shaped settee in the main salon and an aft cabin with a double central island berth. The galley is located on the port side just aft of the companionway ladder. The galley is of straight configuration and is equipped with a stove, a refrigerator, freezer and a double sink. A navigation station is forward of the galley, on the port side. There are two heads, one just forward of the bow cabin in the forepeak and one on the starboard side in the aft cabin.

The design has a hull speed of 8.08 kn (14.96 km/h) and a PHRF handicap of 126.

== Operational history ==
In a 2002 Yachting World review, noted, "Love ’em or loathe ’em, there’s no denying the popularity of centre cockpit yachts ... The first thing you notice when approaching the Beneteau Oceanis 42CC is her enormous rear end. The central part of the aft deck slides back to reveal steps, and with the help of a remote handset linked to a hydraulic powerpack, the middle pan of the transom folds down to form a bathing platform. This neat bit of design works well and also allows for a large aft deck which would happily accommodate a couple of sunworshippers, as well as providing deep locker space either side. The one drawback of this stern arrangement, in my view, is that it affects the aesthetics of the yacht."

In a 2003 review for Yacht and Boat, Barry Tranter wrote, "the overall impression is that it is a clever boat, which provides a very civilised environment in which to live. It is big boat, more like a 48 footer and you could happily live aboard for long periods of time, without being annoyed by petty shortcomings in the habitat, though perhaps that is another by product of the advancing years."

== See also ==
- List of sailing boat types
