= Beneteau First 18 SE =

Sailboat class

Development
- Designer: Samuel Manuard
- Location: France; Slovenia
- Year: 2008
- No. built: more than 500
- Builders: Seascape; Beneteau
- Role: Racer-Cruiser
- Name: Beneteau First 18 SE

Boat
- Displacement: 1,102 lb (500 kg) empty
- Draft: 4.92 ft (1.50 m) with keel down

Hull
- Type: monohull
- Construction: glassfibre
- LOA: 18.21 ft (5.55 m)
- Beam: 7.81 ft (2.38 m)
- Engine: outboard motor

Hull appendages
- Keel: Lifting keel
- Ballast: 276 lb (125 kg)
- Rudder: Dual transom-mounted rudders

Rig
- Rig type: Bermuda rig

Sails
- Sailplan: 7/8 Fractional rigged sloop
- Mainsail area: 156 sq ft (14.5 m^{2})
- Jib/genoa area: 99 sq ft (9.2 m^{2})
- Gennaker area: 344 sq ft (32.0 m^{2})
- Other sails: Code 0: 205 sq ft (19.0 m^{2})
- Upwind sail area: 255 sq ft (23.7 m^{2})
- Downwind sail area: 501 sq ft (46.5 m^{2})

The Beneteau First 18 SE (Seascape Edition), previously called the Beneteau First 18 and the Seascape 18, is a keelboat built by Seascape in Slovenia from 2003 to 2018, when Beneteau of France bought a controlling interest in the company. It then became the Beneteau First 18 from 2018 to 2020. In 2021 it was renamed the Beneteau First 18 SE (Seascape Edition). As of 2023 it remains in production. By 2023, more than 500 boats had been delivered to customers.

It is sometimes confused with the Beneteau First 18 which was introduced in 1978.

== Design ==
Designed by Samuel Manuard, the industrial design work was done by Gigodesign. The hull is predominantly of a polyester glassfibre sandwich. The hull has a plumb stem, a nearly vertical transom, dual transom-hung rudders controlled by a tiller and a swing keel or optional shoal draft swing keel. It displaces 1,102 lb (500 kg) empty and carries 276 lb (125 kg) of cast iron ballast with the standard keel and 320 lb (145 kg) of cast iron ballast for the shoal draft keel.

The boat has a draft of 4.92 ft (1.50 m) with the standard swing keel in the down position and 3.58 ft (1.09 m) with the optional shoal draft swing keel in the down position. The boat has a draft of 0.5 ft (0.15 m) with the standard keel retracted and 1.0 ft (0.30 m) with the shoal draft keel retracted, allowing operation in shallow water, beaching or ground transportation on a trailer.

The boat is normally fitted with a small outboard motor for docking and maneuvering. The boat may be sailed solo, is normally raced with two sailors and the cockpit provides seating for four adults.

The design has a minimalist interior, with sleeping accommodation for two people plus two stowage bins. A boom tent is optional allowing sleeping in the cockpit. Even with the limited accommodations, one young Austrian couple sailed a Seascape 18 down the Danube River, through the Black Sea, the Greek islands and returned via the Adriatic Sea.

It has a 7/8 fractional sloop rig with no backstay or spreaders, a deck-stepped mast and carbon fibre spars with 1X19 stainless steel wire standing rigging. It has a 4.59 ft (1.40 m) retractable bowsprit, a roller furling jib and a square-topped mainsail. For reaching and sailing downwind the design may be equipped with an asymmetrical spinnaker of 344 sq ft (32.0 m^{2}) with a snuffer system, or code 0 sail of 205 sq ft (19.0 m^{2}).

== European championships ==
The 2019 European championships were held in Portorož, Slovenia with 25 boats from eight countries competing and won by Dejan Presen and Denes Szilagyi.

The 2022 European championships were held in Portorož, Slovenia and won by professional sailors Vid Jeranko and Karlo Hmeljak.

The class European championships for 2023 were held in Gmunden, on Lake Traunsee, Austria and attracted 35 teams from seven countries with the Slovenian team of Dejan Presen and Denes Szilágyi winning.

== Reception ==
The boat was named European Yacht of the Year in 2010, Sail Magazine 2016 Best Boats Winner and Sailing World 2016 Boat of the Year.

In a 2016 review, Charles J. Doane described it as "a very exciting package and should check all or most boxes on the lists of buyers looking for a fun, affordable, versatile and easy-to-manage sport boat."

In a 2023 review, Master Yachting wrote, "the First 18 SE formerly known as Seascape 18 is a sailboat for people who want to start exploring sailing and grow into well-versed sailors weather in one design club racing or adventure sailing. With well over 500 owners of First 18 SE – Seascape Edition worldwide, she proves she is a perfect sport boat for recreational sailors who would like to challenge themselves in well-established one-design class ... Being easily trailable and dismantled, she would fulfil racing ambitions in international one-design class as well as adventurous sea-camping."
