= Beneteau 37 =

Sailboat class

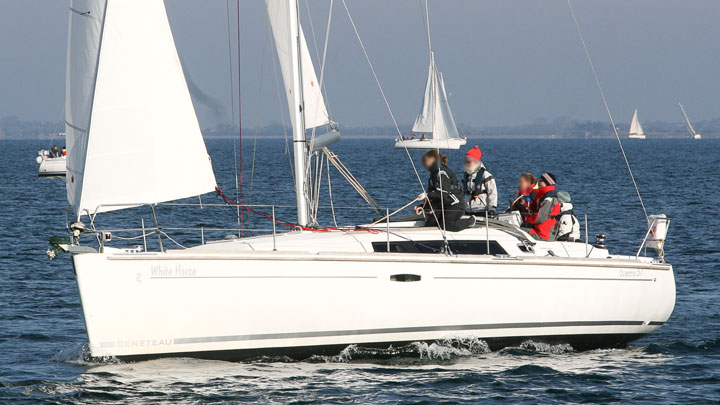

Development
- Designer: Finot/Conq
- Location: France
- Year: 2006
- Builder: Beneteau
- Role: Cruiser-Racer
- Name: Beneteau 37

Boat
- Displacement: 14,008 lb (6,354 kg)
- Draft: 4.58 ft (1.40 m)

Hull
- Type: monohull
- Construction: glassfibre
- LOA: 37.67 ft (11.48 m)
- LWL: 34.08 ft (10.39 m)
- Beam: 12.83 ft (3.91 m)
- Engine: Yanmar 29 or 40 hp (22 or 30 kW) diesel engine

Hull appendages
- Keel: Fin keel
- Ballast: 4,253 lb (1,929 kg)
- Rudder: Spade-type rudder

Rig
- Rig type: Bermuda rig
- I foretriangle height: 45.83 ft (13.97 m)
- J foretriangle base: 15.00 ft (4.57 m)
- P mainsail luff: 43.00 ft (13.11 m)
- E mainsail foot: 12.83 ft (3.91 m)

Sails
- Sailplan: Fractional rigged sloop
- Mainsail area: 275.85 sq ft (25.627 m^{2})
- Jib/genoa area: 343.73 sq ft (31.934 m^{2})
- Total sail area: 619.58 sq ft (57.561 m^{2})

Racing
- PHRF: 105-135

The Beneteau 37, also called the Oceanis 37 and the Moorings 37.2 for the yacht charter market, is a French sailboat that was designed by Finot/Conq as a cruiser-racer and first built in 2006.

== Production ==
The design was built by Beneteau in France and also in Marion, South Carolina, United States, starting in 2006, but it is now out of production.

== Design ==
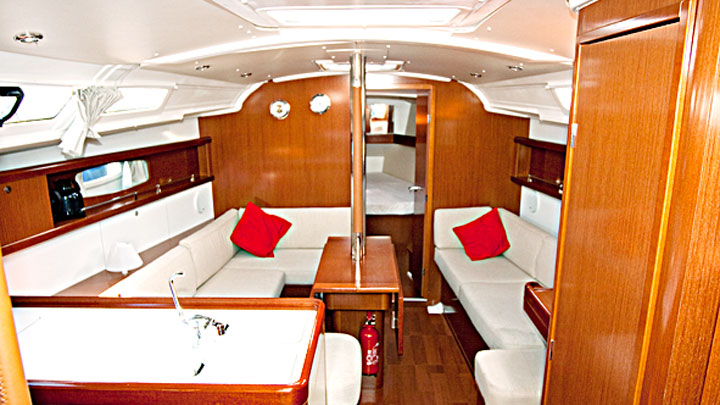
Oceanis 37 interior

The Beneteau 37 is a recreational keelboat, built predominantly of glassfibre, with wood trim. It has a fractional sloop rig, with a deck-stepped mast, one set of swept spreaders and aluminium spars with stainless steel wire standing rigging. The hull has a slightly raked stem, a reverse transom with a swimming platform, an internally mounted spade-type rudder controlled by a wheel and a fixed fin keel or optional deep-draft keel. It displaces 14,008 lb (6,354 kg) and carries 4,253 lb (1,929 kg) of ballast in the fin keel model and 3,902 lb (1,770 kg) of ballast in the deep draft keel model.

The boat has a draft of 4.58 ft (1.40 m) with the standard keel and 6.25 ft (1.91 m) with the optional deep draft keel.

The boat is fitted with a Japanese Yanmar diesel engine of 29 or 40 hp (22 or 30 kW) for docking and manoeuvring. The fuel tank holds 34 U.S. gallons (130 L; 28 imp gal) and the fresh water tank has a capacity of 95 U.S. gallons (360 L; 79 imp gal).

The design has sleeping accommodation for four or six people, in two or three cabins. It has a double "V"-berth berth in the bow cabin, a U-shaped settee and a straight settee in the main cabin and an aft cabin with a double berth on the port side, or two aft cabins, each with a double berth. The galley is located on the port side just forward of the companionway ladder. The galley is L-shaped and is equipped with a two-burner stove, an icebox and a double sink. A navigation station is opposite the galley, on the starboard side. The head is located aft on the starboard side.

The design has a hull speed of 7.82 kn (14.48 km/h) and a PHRF handicap of 105 to 135.

== Operational history ==
In a Yacht and Boat review, Barry Tanter wrote, "This boat now embraces much of the philosophy of the cruiser/racer. Any boat can be sailed as a club racer but the 37 will fill the role with some flair as she slips happily through the water, she has good stability and is fun to drive. She will probably do best with a bit of breeze, and a few bodies on the rail. As a social sailor, her cockpit is large and the skipper can do the work without disturbing the guests. For her role as a cruiser I wish I knew how she would handle a bouncy sea offshore. In a perfect world, these sail tests would provide all possible weather conditions in one day. But a perfect world, I have found, can be elusive."

In a 2008 review for Cruising World, Jeremy McGeary wrote, "the Beneteau 37 has more area in the foretriangle than in the mainsail, although it still sports an easy-to-tame 105-percent genoa. When we were sailing upwind in a gusty breeze, the first reef we took was in the main, and this tamed the helm immediately, although the boat was still a handful in the bigger puffs, and I would've appreciated better footing at my preferred steering position on the windward side. On the wind, the Beneteau 37, showing its Finot-Conq lineage, embarrassed boats of greater waterline length despite having an in-mast furling mainsail. Off the wind, the large headsail helped provide solid performance across a wide range of wind angles."

== See also ==
- List of sailing boat types
