= Beneteau First 235 =

1980s recreational keelboat

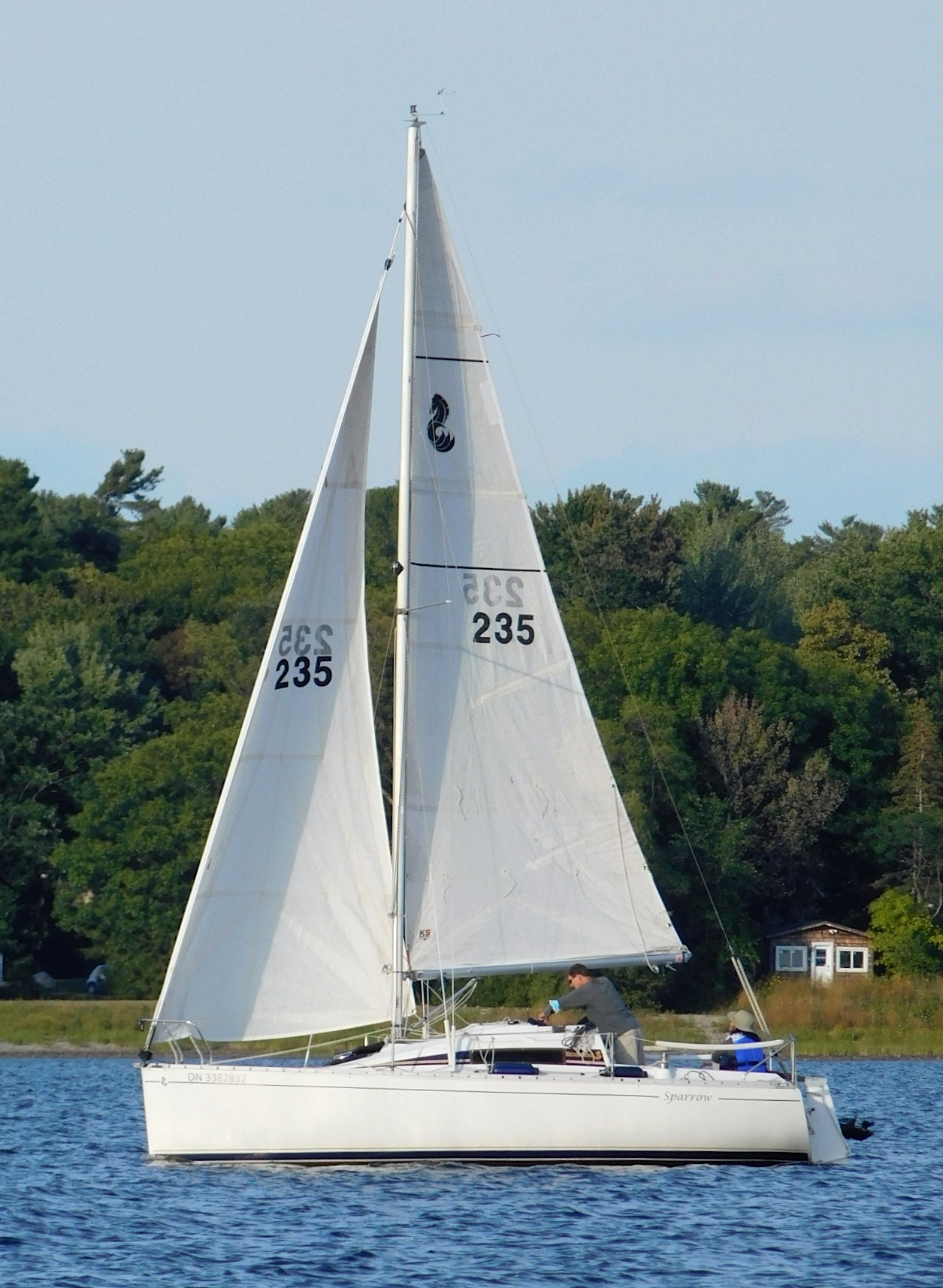

Development
- Designer: Group Finot
- Location: France
- Year: 1986
- No. built: 680
- Builder: Beneteau
- Name: Beneteau First 235

Boat
- Displacement: 2,826 lb (1,282 kg)
- Draft: 3.80 ft (1.16 m)

Hull
- Type: Monohull
- Construction: Glassfibre
- LOA: 23.33 ft (7.11 m)
- LWL: 20.25 ft (6.17 m)
- Beam: 8.17 ft (2.49 m)
- Engine: Outboard motor

Hull appendages
- Keel: fin keel
- Ballast: 825 lb (374 kg)
- Rudder: /transom-mounted rudder

Rig
- General: Fractional rigged sloop
- I foretriangle height: 28.61 ft (8.72 m)
- J foretriangle base: 7.87 ft (2.40 m)
- P mainsail luff: 26.41 ft (8.05 m)
- E mainsail foot: 10.30 ft (3.14 m)

Sails
- Mainsail area: 136.01 sq ft (12.636 m^{2})
- Jib/genoa area: 112.58 sq ft (10.459 m^{2})
- Total sail area: 248.59 sq ft (23.095 m^{2})

Racing
- PHRF: 189 (swing keel or fin keel)

The Beneteau First 235 is a recreational keelboat built by Beneteau in France and the United States between 1986 and 1991, with 680 completed.

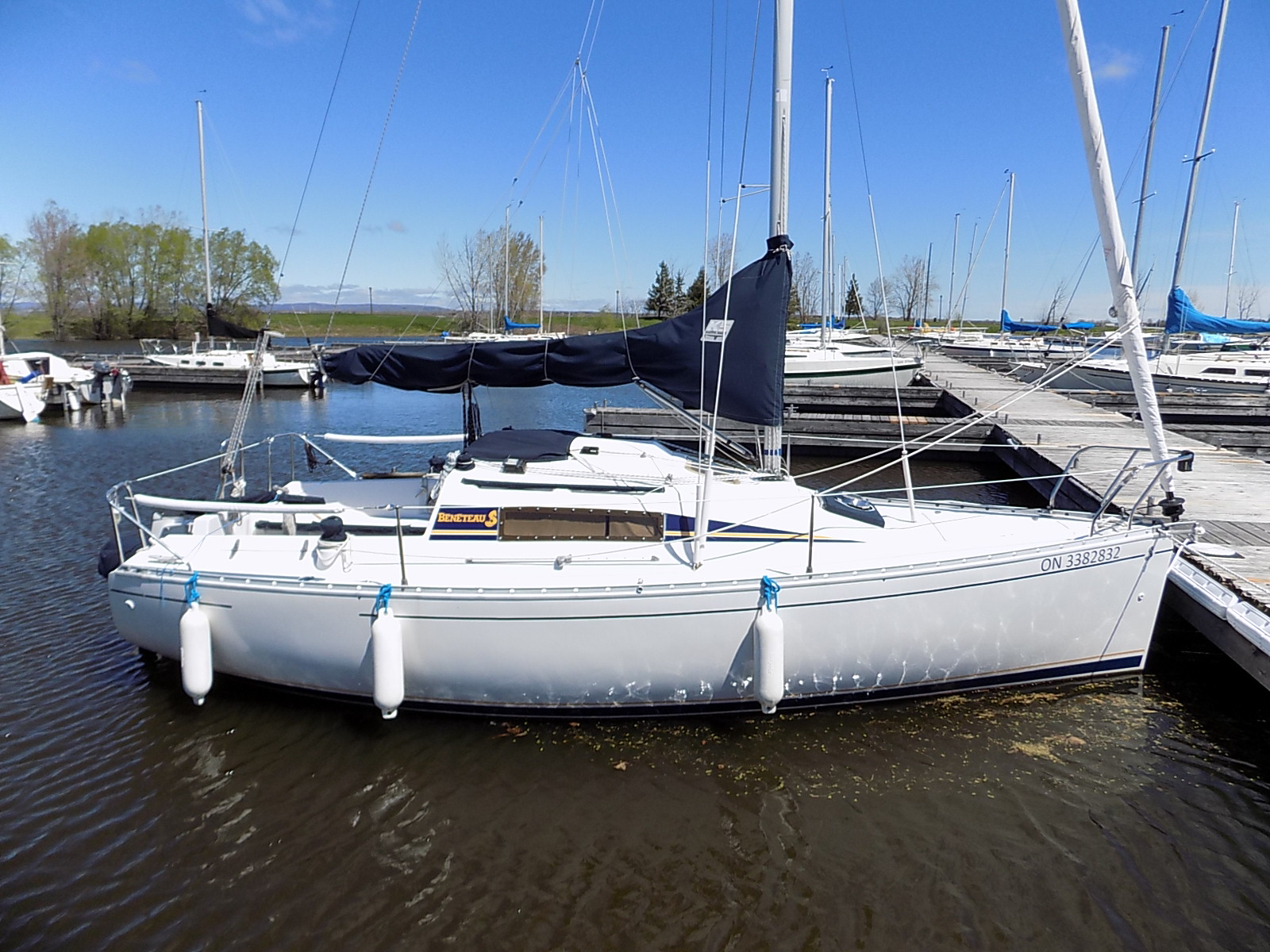
Beneteau First 235

Designed by Group Finot, the glassfibre hull has a transom-hung rudder. It has a draft of 3.80 ft (1.16 m) with the standard fin keel and 2.75 ft (0.84 m) with the optional shoal draft wing keel. The centreboard version has a draft of 5.75 ft (1.75 m) with the centreboard extended and 2.16 ft (0.66 m) with it retracted. The hull speed is 6.03 kn (11.17 km/h).

The cabin has good headroom and an enclosed head.

It has a fractional sloop rig.
