= Beneteau First 18 =

Sailboat class

Development
- Designer: Groupe Finot
- Location: France
- Year: 1978
- No. built: 1065
- Builder: Beneteau
- Role: Micro Class racer-cruiser and day sailer
- Name: Beneteau First 18

Boat
- Displacement: 1,389 lb (630 kg)
- Draft: 3.61 ft (1.10 m) with keel down

Hull
- Type: monohull
- Construction: glassfibre
- LOA: 18.04 ft (5.50 m)
- LWL: 16.57 ft (5.05 m)
- Beam: 7.87 ft (2.40 m)
- Engine: outboard motor

Hull appendages
- Keel: Swing keel
- Ballast: 397 lb (180 kg)
- Rudder: Transom-mounted rudder

Rig
- Rig type: Bermuda rig
- I foretriangle height: 22.57 ft (6.88 m)
- J foretriangle base: 6.46 ft (1.97 m)
- P mainsail luff: 22.47 ft (6.85 m)
- E mainsail foot: 8.53 ft (2.60 m)

Sails
- Sailplan: 7/8 Fractional rigged sloop
- Mainsail area: 108 sq ft (10.0 m^{2})
- Jib/genoa area: 81 sq ft (7.5 m^{2})
- Spinnaker area: 199 sq ft (18.5 m^{2})
- Other sails: storm jib: 22 sq ft (2.0 m^{2})
- Upwind sail area: 189 sq ft (17.6 m^{2})
- Downwind sail area: 307 sq ft (28.5 m^{2})

The First 18 is a French trailerable sailboat that was designed by Groupe Finot as a Micro Class racer-cruiser and day sailer and first built in 1978.

The design is sometimes confused with the much later Beneteau First 18 SE which was introduced in 2008 as the Seascape 18 and then sold as the Beneteau First 18 from 2018 to 2020. From 2021 it has been sold as the First 18 SE.

== Production ==
The design was built by Beneteau in France, from 1978 to 1981, with 1065 boats completed, but it is now out of production. Production time was 150 hours per boat.

== Design ==
The First 18 is a recreational keelboat, built predominantly of glassfibre, with wood trim. The hull is solid fibreglass and the deck is balsa-cored. It has a 7/8 fractional sloop rig, with a deck-stepped mast, one set of swept spreaders and aluminium spars with continuous stainless steel wire standing rigging. The hull has a raked stem, a reverse transom, a transom-hung rudder controlled by a tiller and a fixed fin keel or optional swing keel. It displaces 1,389 lb (630 kg) and carries 397 lb (180 kg) of cast iron ballast.

The keel-equipped version of the boat has a draft of 2.58 ft (0.79 m), while the swing keel-equipped version has a draft of 3.61 ft (1.10 m) with the keel extended and 1.83 ft (0.56 m) with it retracted, allowing operation in shallow water, beaching or ground transportation on a trailer.

The boat is normally fitted with a small outboard motor for docking and maneuvering.

The design has sleeping accommodation for four people, with a double "V"-berth berth in the bow and two quarter berths under the cockpit, plus a folding table. The galley consists of a fold down stove, located on the starboard side. Cabin headroom is 4.42 in (11 cm).

For sailing downwind the design may be equipped with a symmetrical spinnaker of 199 sq ft (18.5 m^{2}). The boat has a hull speed of 5.45 kn (10.09 km/h).

== Operational history ==
The boat is supported by an active class club that organizes racing events, the International Micro Cupper Class Association.

In a 2022 review, Emmanuel Van Deth wrote, "the First 18, in the pocket cruiser category, is certainly one of the best choices. It opens all kinds of programs: day trips, regattas, cabotage... and why not bigger trips. A perfect support for those who have sailing ambitions inversely proportional to their budget."

== See also ==
- List of sailing boat types
