= Yamaha 29 =

Sailboat manufactured by Yamaha

The Yamaha 29 was a sailboat manufactured by Yamaha.

On request from Yamaha, Group Finot in France designed the boat in 1973. The hull is based on the same classical design as the Morbic III who won the Fastnet the same year. The layout is innovative with a center cockpit and the main cabin in the rear.

The Yamaha team with Mr Horinshi was very impressed with the design, and two prototypes were made in 1975. Despite receiving positive reviews from press and owners, only 55 were built. About 5 of those were sold to Norway.

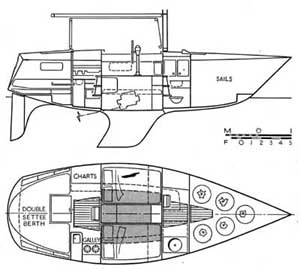
Yamaha 29 GA
