= Beneteau 1 Ton =

French sailboat design

Development
- Designer: Groupe Finot; Jean Berret; Jacques Fauroux
- Location: France
- Year: 1983
- No. built: 12
- Builder: Beneteau
- Role: Racer
- Name: Beneteau 1 Ton

Boat
- Displacement: 12,125 lb (5,500 kg)
- Draft: 7.22 ft (2.20 m)

Hull
- Type: monohull
- Construction: carbon fibre-Kevlar foam sandwich
- LOA: 39.40 ft (12.01 m)
- LWL: 30.00 ft (9.14 m)
- Beam: 13.09 ft (3.99 m)
- Engine: Volvo MD 17 diesel engine

Hull appendages
- Keel: Fin keel
- Ballast: 6,878 lb (3,120 kg)
- Rudder: Spade-type rudder

Rig
- Rig type: Bermuda rig

Sails
- Sailplan: Fractional rigged sloop
- Total sail area: 829 sq ft (77.0 m^{2})

Racing
- PHRF: 60-72

The Beneteau 1 Ton, also called the Beneteau First 40 Evolution, is a French sailboat that was designed by Groupe Finot, Jean Berret and Jacques Fauroux as an International Offshore Rule One Ton class racer and first built in 1983.

The design was developed into the Beneteau First Class 12 racer in 1985.

== Production ==
The design was built by Beneteau in France at their custom boat yard, from 1983 until 1985, with 12 boats completed, but it is now out of production.

== Design ==
The 1 Ton is a racing keelboat, that was built with the most advanced materials that were available at the time: a carbon fibre-Kevlar foam sandwich. It has a fractional sloop rig, with a keel-stepped mast with three sets of unswept spreaders. The hull has a raked stem, an open reverse transom, an internally mounted spade-type rudder controlled by a tiller and a fixed fin keel. It displaces 12,125 lb (5,500 kg) and carries 6,878 lb (3,120 kg) of ballast.

The boat has a draft of 7.22 ft (2.20 m) with the standard keel and is fitted with a Swedish Volvo MD 17 diesel engine for docking and manoeuvring. The fuel tank holds 4 U.S. gallons (15 L; 3.3 imp gal).

As a racer the design has minimal accommodation, with berths for eight people.

The design has a hull speed of 7.34 kn (13.59 km/h) and a PHRF handicap of 60 to 72.

== Operational history ==
The boat was at one time supported by a class club that organized racing events, the One Ton Class.

A 1 Ton named Phoenix won first place in the 1985 Admiral's Cup over 17 other boats, including three other Beneteau 1 Tons, on individual points, skippered by Harold Cudmore. Cudmore had substituted the boat into the race at the last minute, when his own boat had sunk during a lead-in race.

Two 1 Tons, Fiere Lady and Glory came in second and fourth overall, in the 1985 Southern Ocean Racing Conference.

== See also ==
- List of sailing boat types
