= Beneteau 311 =

Keelboat built in France 1997–2003

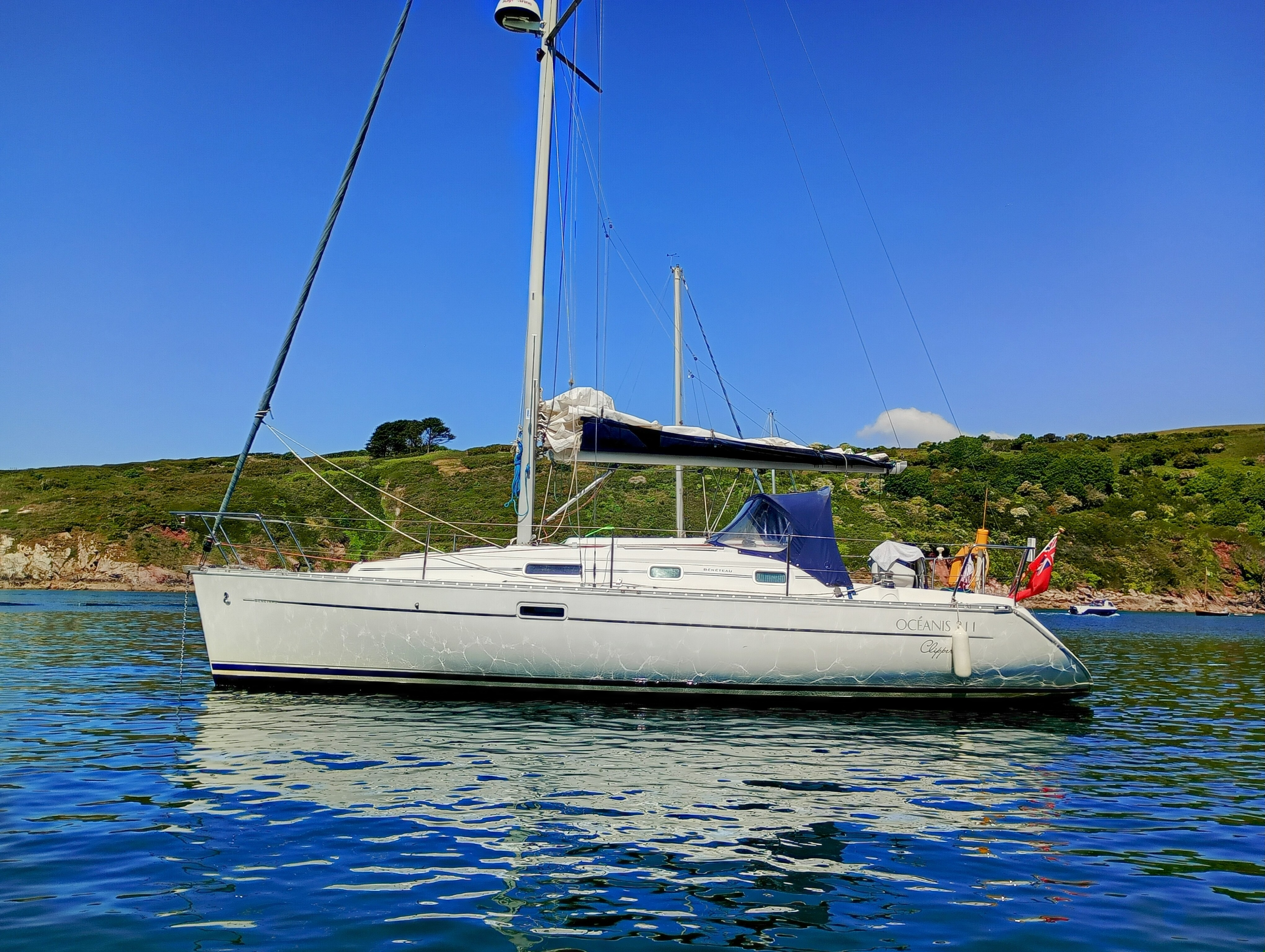
- Standard Beneteau Oceanis 311 at anchor in the UK 2025

Development
- Designer: Groupe Finot
- Location: France
- Year: 1997
- No. built: 1042
- Builder: Beneteau
- Role: Cruiser
- Name: Beneteau 311

Boat
- Displacement: 7,716 lb (3,500 kg)
- Draft: 4.67 ft (1.42 m)

Hull
- Type: monohull
- Construction: glassfibre
- LOA: 32.25 ft (9.83 m)
- LWL: 28.67 ft (8.74 m)
- Beam: 10.50 ft (3.20 m)
- Engine: Yanmar 18 hp (13 kW) diesel engine

Hull appendages
- Keel: Fin keel with weighted bulb
- Ballast: 2,425 lb (1,100 kg)
- Rudder: Spade-type rudder

Rig
- Rig type: Bermuda rig
- I foretriangle height: 40.35 ft (12.30 m)
- J foretriangle base: 11.35 ft (3.46 m)
- P mainsail luff: 36.61 ft (11.16 m)
- E mainsail foot: 13.19 ft (4.02 m)

Sails
- Sailplan: Fractional rigged sloop
- Mainsail area: 277 sq ft (25.7 m^{2})
- Jib/genoa area: 262 sq ft (24.3 m^{2})
- Upwind sail area: 538 sq ft (50.0 m^{2})

Racing
- PHRF: 141-159

The Beneteau 311 is a recreational keelboat, built in France by Beneteau from 1997 to 2003, with 1042 boats built.

The design was also marketed as the Oceanis 311, and the Stardust 311 for the yacht charter market. The hull design was also the basis for the Figaro Solo, the Beneteau First 310, Beneteau First 31.7 and the Beneteau Oceanis 300.

== Design ==
Designed by Groupe Finot, the hull is solid polyester glassfibre, with a balsa core deck. The hull has a slightly raked stem, a reverse transom, and an internally mounted spade-type rudder controlled by a wheel.

It has a fractional sloop rig, with a deck-stepped mast, one set of swept spreaders and aluminium spars with continuous 1X19 stainless steel wire standing rigging. A mast-furling mainsail was optional.

The Oceanis 311 Clipper was a model with many factory options as standard equipment.

It has a hull speed of 7.17 kn (13.28 km/h). Keel variantes include:

- a fixed fin keel with a weighted bulb and a PHRF handicap of 141 to 159
- a stub keel with a bottom beaching plate
- a centreboard version with a PHRF handicap of 168.

The fuel tank holds 17 U.S. gallons (64 L; 14 imp gal) and the fresh water tank has a capacity of 48 U.S. gallons (180 L; 40 imp gal).

The design has sleeping accommodation for four people, with a double "V"-berth berth, two straight settees around a table in the main cabin and an aft cabin with a double berth on the port side. The galley is to port just forward of the companionway ladder. It is C-shaped and is equipped with a four-burner stove, an ice box and a double sink. A navigation station is opposite the galley. The head is starboard aft and includes a shower. Cabin headroom is 73 in (185 cm).
