= Group Finot =

Sailboat design firm

- Company type: Privately held company
- Industry: Naval architecture
- Founded: 1969
- Founder: Jean-Marie Finot
- Headquarters: Jouy-en-Josas, France
- Key people: President: Jean-Marie Finot
- Products: Sailboats
- Subsidiaries: Groupe Finot - Conq
- Website: www.finot.com

Group Finot is a French boat design company based in Jouy-en-Josas. Founded by Jean-Marie Finot, the company specializes in the design of fiberglass sailboats.

The company also collaborates with designer Pascal Conq as Groupe Finot - Conq, based in Vannes, France.

== History ==
The company was founded by Finot in 1969 when he designed his first boat, the International Offshore Rule Quarter Ton class champion Ecume de Mer (Sea Foam) that was built by Chantier Malliard.

By 2017 the company had designed 61 boats for Beneteau, their biggest customer. The first design for Beneteau was in 1978.

== Boats ==
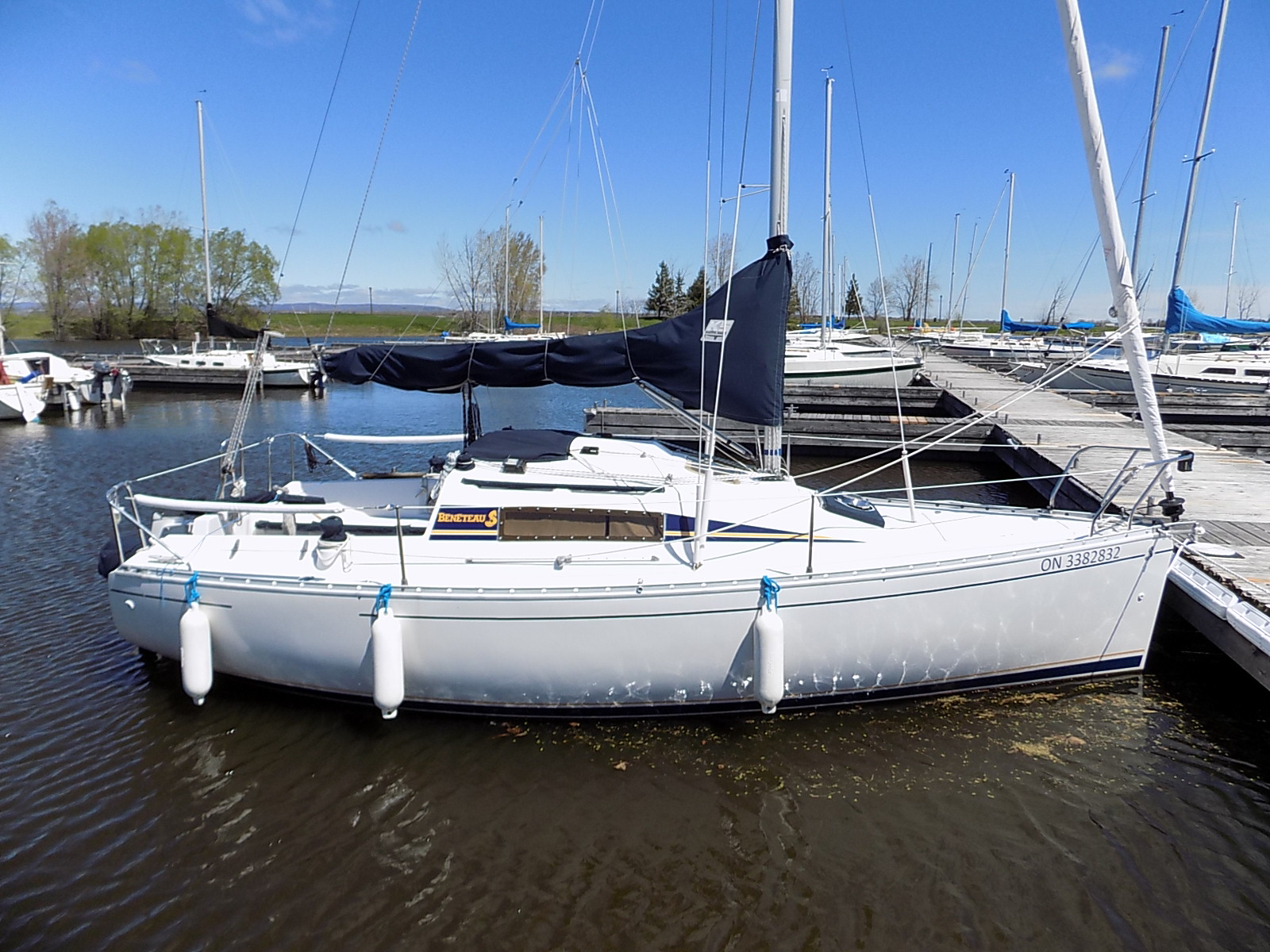
Beneteau First 235, a 1986 Finot design

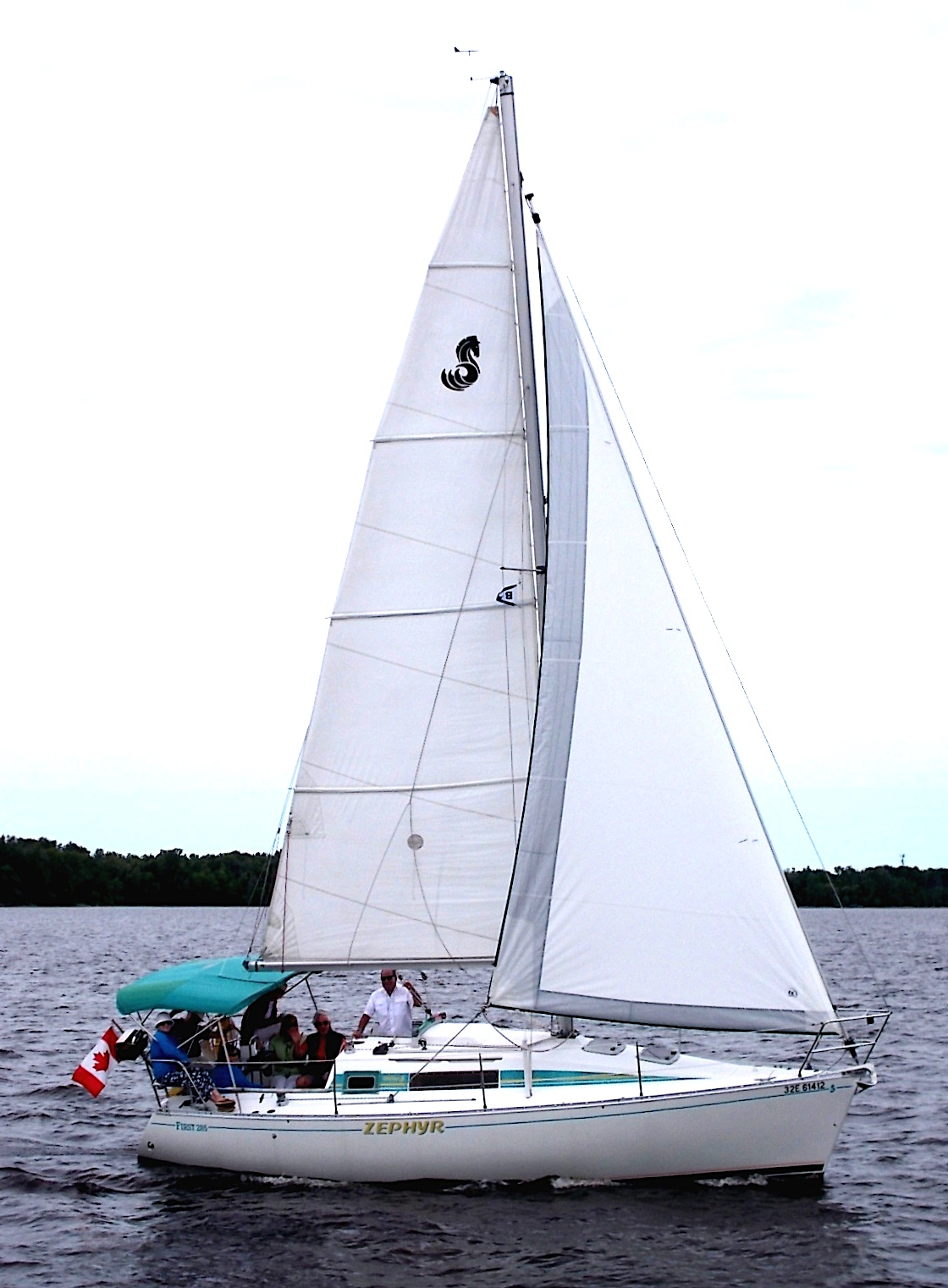
Beneteau First 285, a 1985 Finot design

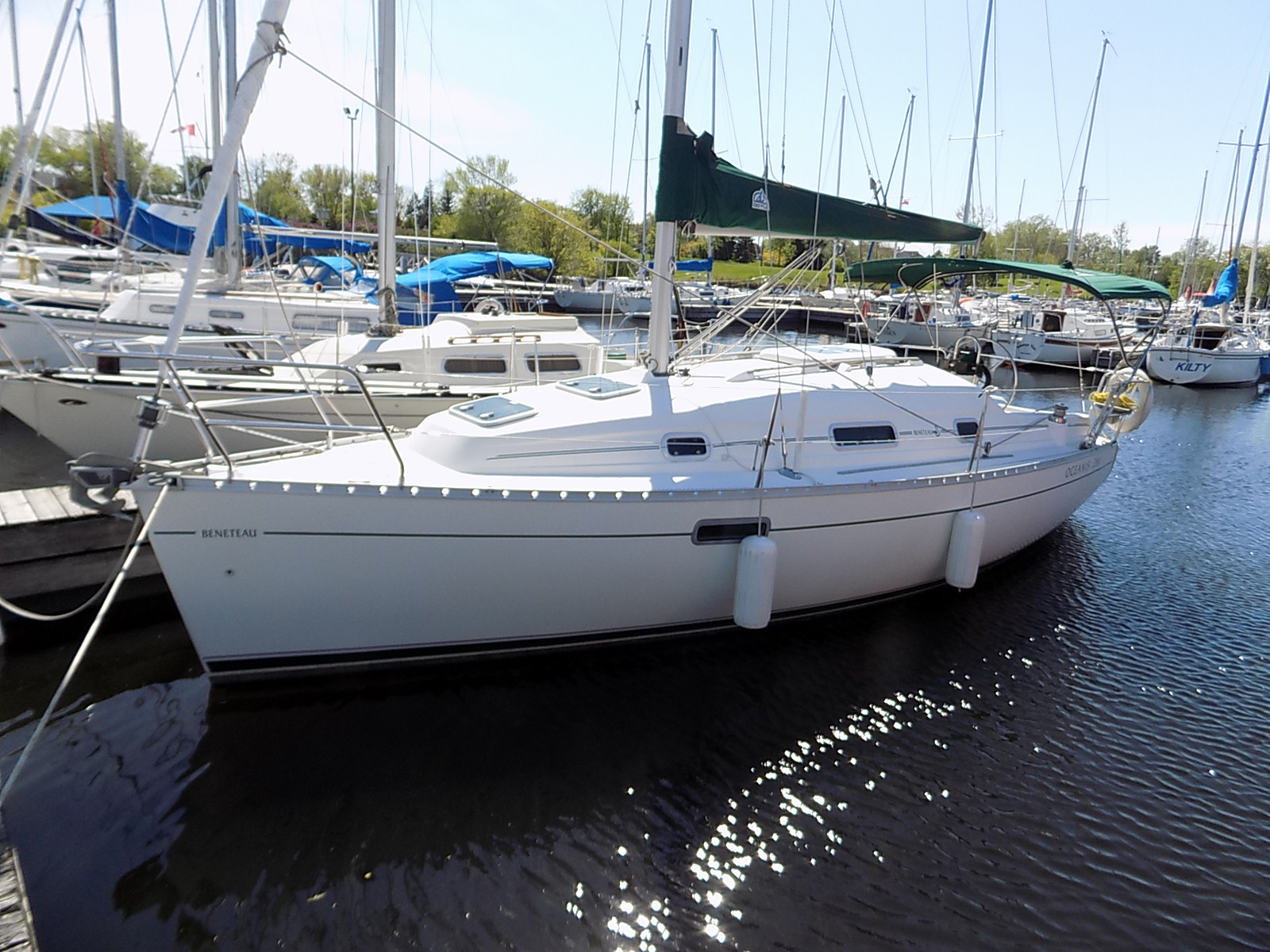
Beneteau Oceanis 281, a 1995 Finot design

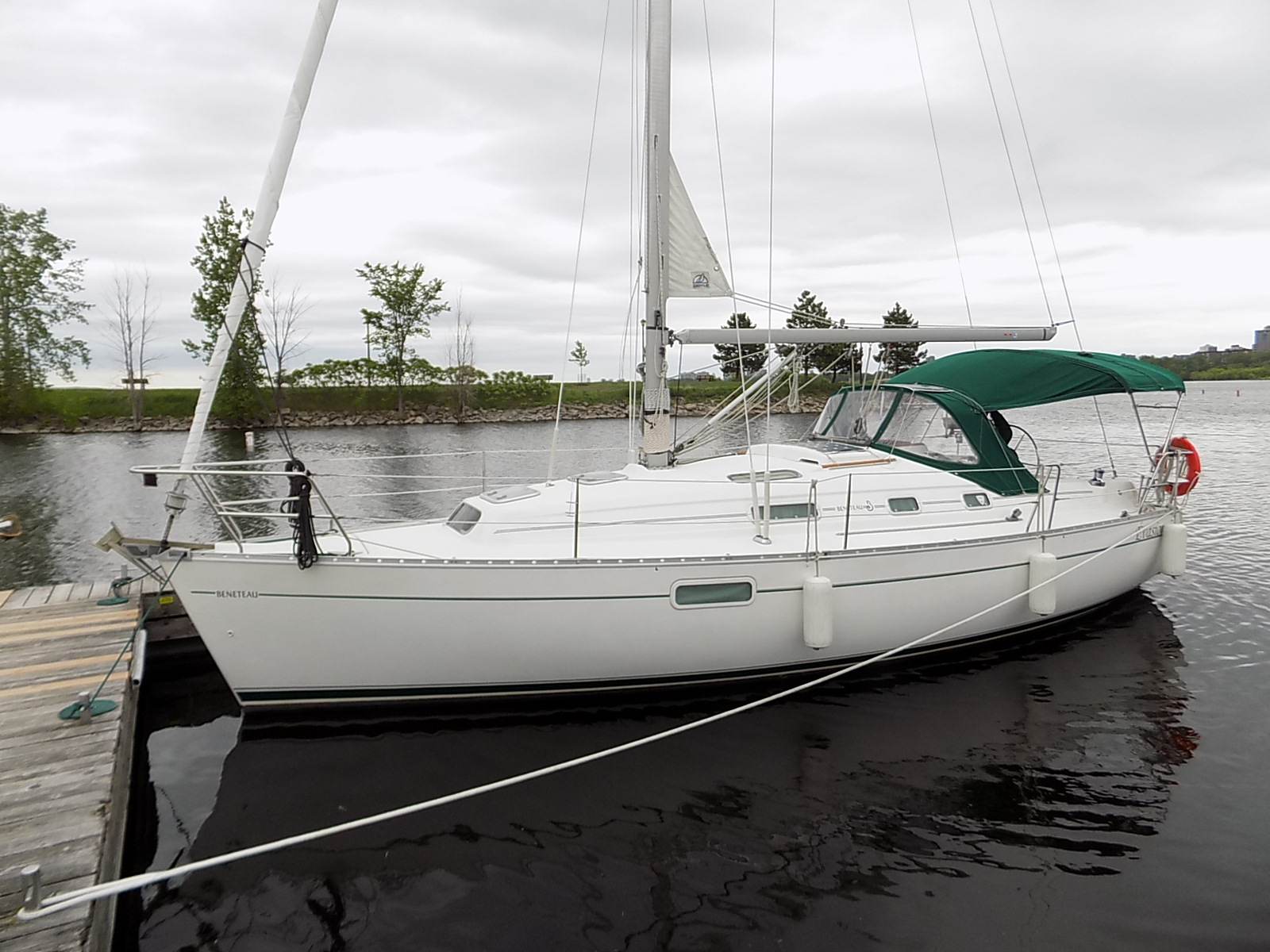
Beneteau Oceanis 321, a 1995 Finot design

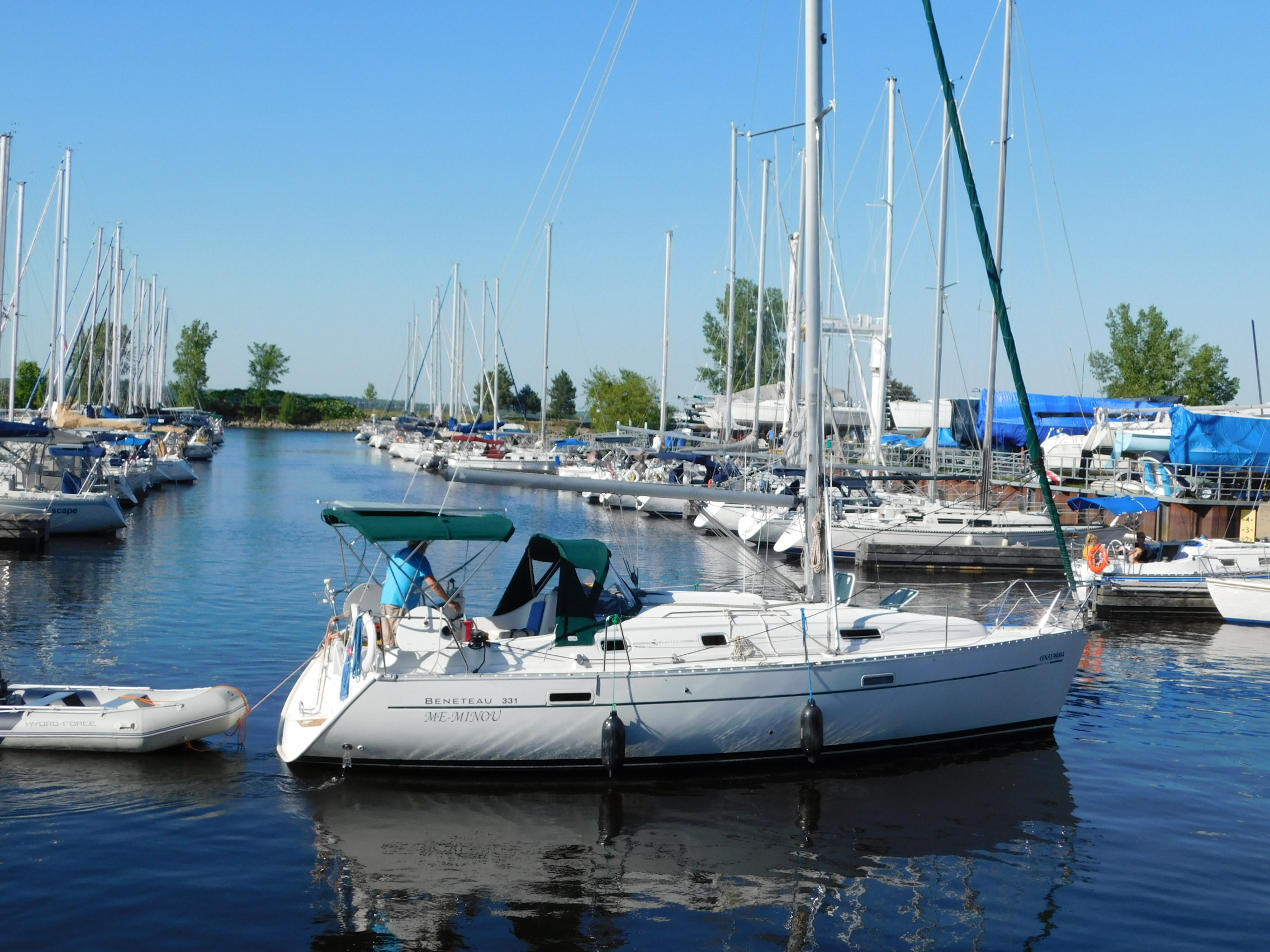
Beneteau 331, a 1999 Finot design

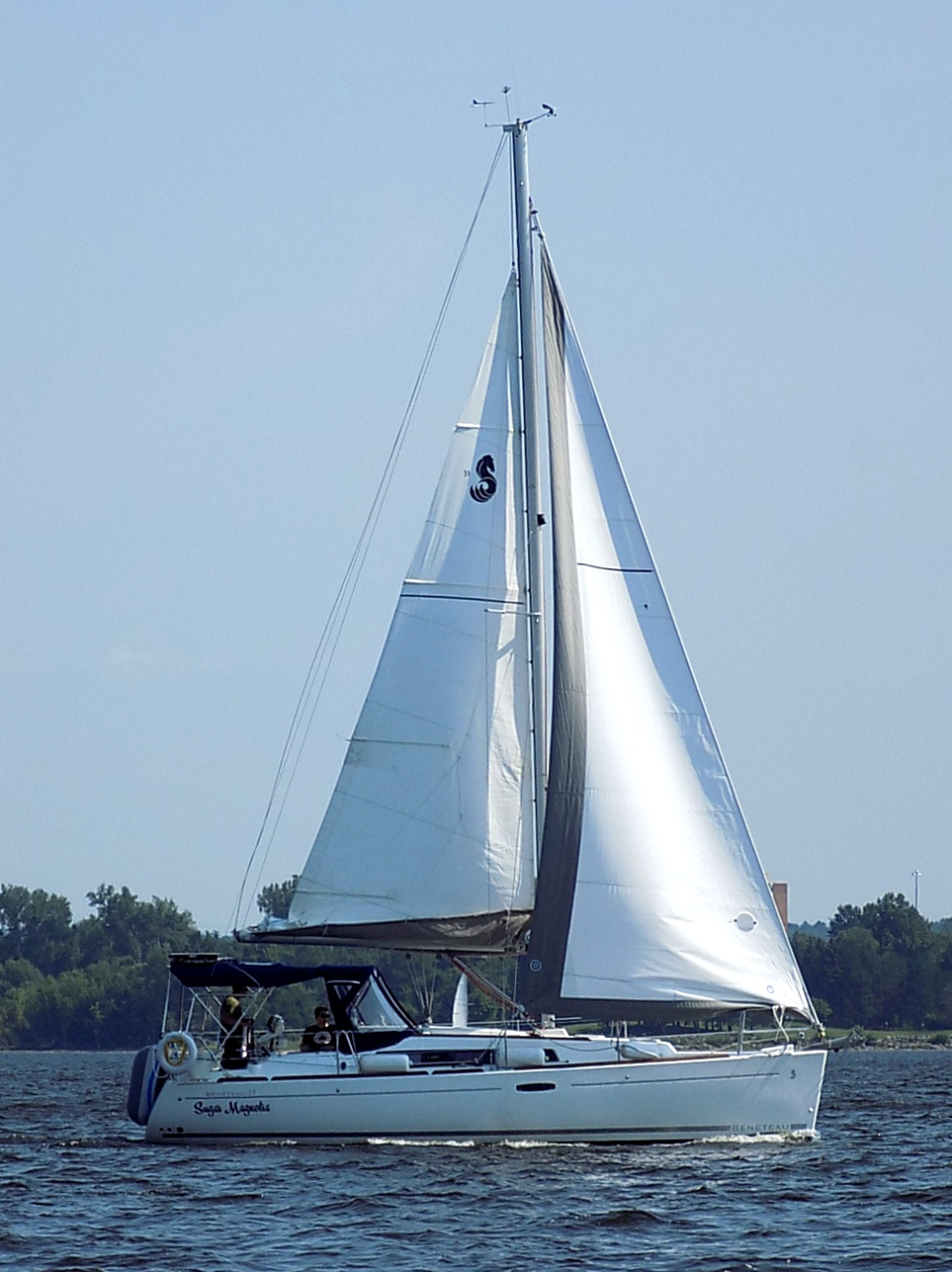
Beneteau 31, a 2002 Finot design

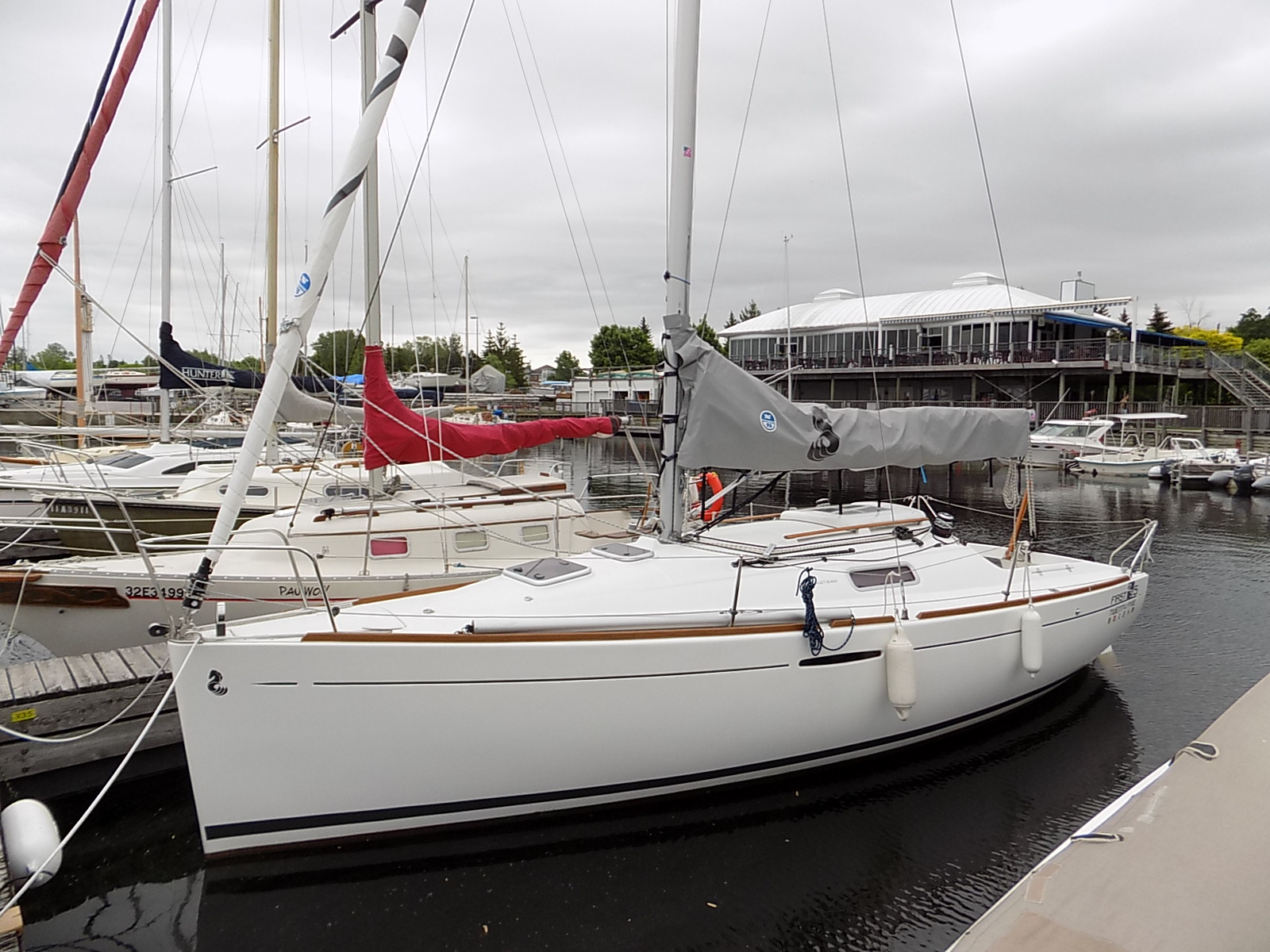
Beneteau First 25S, a 2008 Finot-Conq design

Summary of boats designed by Group Finot, by year:

- Ecume De Mer 1968
- Jenneau Folie Douce 1970
- Brise De Mer 31 1970
- Brise De Mer 31 (LC) 1970
- Passatore 1971
- Comet 910 1971
- Grand Soleil 34 (Finot) 1972
- Aloa 29 1972
- Fleur De Mer 1972
- Comet 801 1972
- Reve De Mer 1972
- Gouteron Chergui 1973
- Fastnet 34 1973
- Comet 770 1973
- Jenneau Brin De Folie 1975
- Yamaha 29 1975
- Brise De Mer 34 1975
- Comet 850 1977
- Comet 11 1977
- Comet 800 1978
- Beneteau First 22 1978
- Beneteau First 18 1978
- Beneteau First 25 SK 1979
- Comet 1000 1979
- Comet 111 1979
- Comet 701 1979
- Beneteau First 25 1979
- Comet 700 1980
- Comet 910 Plus 1980
- Comet 14 1980
- Beneteau First 28 1980
- Wegu 701 (Finot) 1980
- Wizz (dinghy) 1981
- Beneteau First 24 1982
- Beneteau First Class 8 1982
- Comet 30 1982
- Beneteau First Class 10 1982
- Comet 13 1982
- Vent De Fete 1982
- Comet 1050 1983
- Beneteau First 29 1983
- Beneteau First Class 7 1983
- Beneteau 1 Ton 1983
- Comet 28 Race 1984
- Comet 15 1984
- Beneteau First 26 1984
- Comet 860 1984
- Beneteau First 285 1985
- Beneteau First Class 12 1985
- Comet 383 1985
- Comet 11 Plus 1985
- Esprit Du Vent 1985
- Beneteau First 235 SK 1986
- Comet 301 1986
- Beneteau First 235 1986
- Comet 375 1987
- Comet 460 1987
- Beneteau First Class Europe 1989
- Grand Soleil 38 (Finot) 1990
- Beneteau First 310 1990
- Beneteau First 265 1990
- Figaro Solo 1990
- Beneteau Oceanis 400 1991
- Beneteau Oceanis 300 1991
- Beneteau First 260 Spirit 1994
- Beneteau First 300 1994
- Beneteau Oceanis 400 CC 1995
- Beneteau Oceanis 281 1995
- Beneteau Oceanis 321 1995
- Moorings 402CC 1996
- Cybelle 325 1997
- Beneteau Oceanis 411 1997
- Beneteau First 210 1998
- Beneteau First 211 1998
- Beneteau 311 1998
- Beneteau Oceanis 311 1998
- Beneteau Oceanis 311 LKTR 1998
- Beneteau First 31.7 1998
- Beneteau Oceanis 331 1999
- Moorings 332 1999
- Beneteau 331 1999
- Giro 34 1999
- Open 5.00 2000
- Beneteau 473 2000
- Beneteau Oceanis 473 2000
- Aerodyne 35 2000
- Beneteau 523 2001
- Beneteau Oceanis 323 2001
- Beneteau 323 2001
- Beneteau Oceanis Clipper 523 2001
- Pogo 2 2001
- Beneteau First 27.7 2002
- Beneteau 423 2002
- Beneteau 31 2002
- Open 5.70 2002
- Cigale 14 2003
- Beneteau 42 CC 2003
- Beneteau Oceanis 42 CC 2003
- Beneteau First 25.7 2004
- Pogo 10.50 2005
- Pogo 40 2005
- Beneteau 37 2006
- Beneteau Oceanis 31 2006
- Beneteau Oceanis 37 2006
- Beneteau First 21.7 2006
- Beneteau First Class 7.5 2008
- Beneteau First 25S 2008
- Beneteau Oceanis 34 2008
- Beneteau 34 2008
- Beneteau First 20 2011
- Pogo 12.5 2011
- Beneteau Oceanis 41 2011
- Beneteau Oceanis 38 2013
- Beneteau Oceanis 45 2013
- Pogo 30 2013
- Beneteau Oceanis 35 2014
- Pogo 36 2016
- Beneteau Oceanis 35.1 2017

== See also ==
- List of sailboat designers and manufacturers
