= Beneteau First 210 =

Sailboat class

Development
- Designer: Groupe Finot
- Location: France
- Year: 1992
- Builder: Beneteau
- Role: Cruiser-Racer
- Name: Beneteau First 210

Boat
- Displacement: 2,225 lb (1,009 kg)
- Draft: 5.83 ft (1.78 m) with keel extended

Hull
- Type: monohull
- Construction: fibreglass
- LOA: 20.34 ft (6.20 m)
- LWL: 19.68 ft (6.00 m)
- Beam: 8.14 ft (2.48 m)
- Engine: outboard motor

Hull appendages
- Keel: swing keel
- Ballast: 772 lb (350 kg)
- Rudder: transom-mounted rudder

Rig
- Rig type: Bermuda rig
- I foretriangle height: 28.18 ft (8.59 m)
- J foretriangle base: 7.87 ft (2.40 m)
- P mainsail luff: 27.03 ft (8.24 m)
- E mainsail foot: 9.35 ft (2.85 m)

Sails
- Sailplan: fractional rigged sloop
- Mainsail area: 126.37 sq ft (11.740 m^{2})
- Jib/genoa area: 110.89 sq ft (10.302 m^{2})
- Total sail area: 237.25 sq ft (22.041 m^{2})

Racing
- PHRF: 195

The Beneteau First 210 is a French trailerable sailboat that was designed by Groupe Finot and first built in 1992 as a cruiser-racer.

The Beneteau First 210 is a member of the commercially successful family of Beneteau First 21 boats that includes the Beneteau First 210 Spirit, 211, 21.7 and the 21.7S. All the boats in the series share the same hull design.

== Production ==
The design was built by Beneteau in France, from 1992 to 1997, but it is now out of production.

== Design ==
The First 210 is a recreational keelboat, built predominantly of fibreglass. It is equipped with positive flotation and is unsinkable. It has a fractional sloop rig, a plumb stem, a vertical transom, dual transom-hung rudders angled outwards at 15° and controlled by a tiller, and a lifting keel. It displaces 2,225 lb (1,009 kg) and carries 772 lb (350 kg) of ballast.

The boat has a draft of 5.83 ft (1.78 m) with the lifting keel extended and 2.33 ft (0.71 m) with it retracted, allowing ground transportation on a trailer.

The boat is normally fitted with a small 3 to 6 hp (2 to 4 kW) outboard motor for docking and manoeuvring.

The design has sleeping accommodation for four people, with a double "V"-berth in the bow cabin and two straight settees in the main cabin. The galley is located on the starboard side just aft of the bow "V"-berth. The head is located opposite the galley on the port side. Cabin headroom is 54 in (140 cm).

For downwind sailing the design may be equipped with a spinnaker.

The design has a PHRF racing average handicap of 195 and a hull speed of 5.9 kn (10.9 km/h).

== Operational history ==
The boat was Sailing World's 1993 Daysailer/Weekender Boat of the Year. Not all of the judges liked the design's aesthetics, however, and they questioned how well it might sell as a result.

In a 1993 review in Cruising World, Herb McCormick described the boat as, "clean and racy", but went on to say, "Looks, however, are deceiving. The Beneteau folks insist this is a pocket cruiser through and through. The simple sail plan underscores that definition: Its wide spreader base precludes the use of an overlapping headsail. The standard 110-percent rollerfurling jib provides plenty of punch, but the boat would still be at a competitive disadvantage in light air without a 150-percent genoa. This alone is refreshing: the 210 is not attempting to be all boats to all sailors."

Naval architect Bob Perry wrote a review, stating, "The 210 will make a great daysailer or a camp-style cruiser. While trailerable sailboats are seldom examples of refined design, the First 210 shows design innovation aimed at sparkling performance and eye appeal. This boat is also unsinkable."

In a 2010 review Steve Henkel praised the design's cabin layout and its "sleek looks", noting, "thought that's a matter of individual taste". He also commented on the boat's low PHRF number, indicating that it is almost as fast as a J/24, a bigger boat that was a purpose-designed racer.

== See also ==
- List of sailing boat types
