= Evasion =

Evasion or evade may refer to:

- Evade, a 1960s board game in the 3M bookshelf game series
- Évadé, the term given to French and Belgian nationals fleeing German-occupied Europe
- Évasion, a Canadian French-language travel and adventure television channel
- Évasion FM, a French local radio station
- Evasion (ethics), a deceptive act
- Evasion (law), to avoid government mandate through specious means (tax evasion, for example)
- Evasion (network security), techniques to by-pass network security devices
- Evasion (numismatics), close copy of a coin with just enough deviation in design and/or legend to avoid violating counterfeit laws
- Evasion (book), a book adapted from a zine of the same title
- Evasi0n, an untethered jailbreaking tool for iOS devices
- Citroën Evasion, a Eurovan minivan
- Evasive, a 2015 studio album by Neurotech
- A series of a French motorsailer designs, including:
  - Beneteau Evasion 22
  - Beneteau Evasion 25
  - Beneteau Evasion 28
  - Beneteau Evasion 29
  - Beneteau Evasion 32
  - Beneteau Evasion 34
  - Beneteau Evasion 36
