= Lancer 30 Mark III =

Sailboat class

Development
- Designer: C&C Design
- Location: United States
- Year: 1979
- Builder: Lancer Yachts
- Role: Cruiser
- Name: Lancer 30 Mark III

Boat
- Displacement: 8,200 lb (3,719 kg)
- Draft: 5.20 ft (1.58 m)

Hull
- Type: monohull
- Construction: fiberglass
- LOA: 29.50 ft (8.99 m)
- LWL: 24.00 ft (7.32 m)
- Beam: 10.00 ft (3.05 m)

Hull appendages
- Keel: fin keel
- Ballast: 3,000 lb (1,361 kg)

Rig
- Rig type: Bermuda rig
- I foretriangle height: 35.00 ft (10.67 m)
- J foretriangle base: 12.90 ft (3.93 m)
- P mainsail luff: 29.00 ft (8.84 m)
- E mainsail foot: 9.80 ft (2.99 m)

Sails
- Sailplan: masthead sloop
- Mainsail area: 142.10 sq ft (13.202 m^{2})
- Jib/genoa area: 225.75 sq ft (20.973 m^{2})
- Total sail area: 367.85 sq ft (34.174 m^{2})

The Lancer 30 Mark III or Lancer 30-3, is an American sailboat that was designed by the Canadian firm C&C Design as a cruiser and first built in 1979.

A development of the Lancer 30 Mark II, which came from the same molds as the C&C 30, the Lancer 30 Mark III design was developed into the Lancer 30 Mark IV.

== Production ==
The design was built by Lancer Yachts in the United States starting in 1979, but it is now out of production.

== Design ==
The Lancer 30 Mark III is a recreational keelboat, built predominantly of fiberglass, with wood trim. It has a masthead sloop rig and a fixed fin keel. It displaces 8,200 lb (3,719 kg) and carries 3,000 lb (1,361 kg) of ballast.

The boat has a draft of 5.20 ft (1.58 m) with the standard keel and a hull speed of 6.57 kn (12.17 km/h).

== See also ==
- List of sailing boat types
