= Lancer 30 Mark V =

Sailboat class

Development
- Designer: C&C Design
- Location: United States
- Year: 1980
- Builder: Lancer Yachts
- Role: Cruiser

Boat
- Displacement: 8,200 lb (3,719 kg)
- Draft: 5.20 ft (1.58 m)

Hull
- Type: monohull
- Construction: fiberglass
- LOA: 29.50 ft (8.99 m)
- LWL: 24.00 ft (7.32 m)
- Beam: 10.00 ft (3.05 m)
- Engine: inboard motor

Hull appendages
- Keel: fin keel
- Ballast: 3,000 lb (1,361 kg)
- Rudder: internally-mounted spade-type rudder

Rig
- Rig type: Bermuda rig
- I foretriangle height: 34.00 ft (10.36 m)
- J foretriangle base: 10.80 ft (3.29 m)
- P mainsail luff: 35.50 ft (10.82 m)
- E mainsail foot: 13.00 ft (3.96 m)

Sails
- Sailplan: fractional rigged sloop
- Mainsail area: 230.75 sq ft (21.437 m^{2})
- Jib/genoa area: 183.60 sq ft (17.057 m^{2})
- Total sail area: 414.35 sq ft (38.494 m^{2})

The Lancer 30 Mark V, also called the Lancer 30 -5, is an American sailboat that was designed by C&C Design as a cruiser and first built in 1980.

The Lancer 30 Mark V is a development of the Lancer 30 Mark IV, which traces its origins to the C&C 30 molds.

== Production ==
The design was built by Lancer Yachts in the United States, between 1980 and 1985, but it is now out of production.

== Design ==
The Lancer 30 Mark V is a recreational keelboat, built predominantly of fiberglass, with wood trim. It has a fractional sloop rig, a raked stem; a raised counter, reverse transom; an internally mounted spade-type rudder controlled by a tiller and a fixed fin keel. It displaces 8,200 lb (3,719 kg) and carries 3,000 lb (1,361 kg) of ballast.

The boat has a draft of 5.20 ft (1.58 m) with the standard keel.

The boat is fitted with an inboard engine for docking and maneuvering. The fuel tank holds 24 U.S. gallons (91 L; 20 imp gal) and the fresh water tank also has a capacity of 24 U.S. gallons (91 L; 20 imp gal).

The design has sleeping accommodation for four people, with a double "V"-berth in the bow cabin with a drop leaf table and an aft cabin with a double berth on the port side. The galley is located on the starboard side amidships. The galley is an open "L"-shape and is equipped with a two-burner stove and a double sink. The head is located on the starboard side at the companionway steps.

The design has a hull speed of 6.57 kn (12.17 km/h).

== See also ==
- List of sailing boat types
