= Lancer 29 PS =

Sailboat class

Development
- Designer: Herb David
- Location: United States
- Year: 1984
- Builder: Lancer Yachts
- Role: Motorsailer

Boat
- Displacement: 6,800 lb (3,084 kg)
- Draft: 5.25 ft (1.60 m)

Hull
- Type: monohull
- Construction: fiberglass
- LOA: 28.58 ft (8.71 m)
- LWL: 23.00 ft (7.01 m)
- Beam: 9.25 ft (2.82 m)
- Engine: outboard motor

Hull appendages
- Keel: long keel

Rig
- Rig type: Bermuda rig

Sails
- Sailplan: fractional rigged sloop

The Lancer 29 PS is an American sailboat that was designed by Herb David as a motorsailer and a cruiser and first built in 1984. The PS designation indicates Power Sailer.

== Production ==
The design was built by Lancer Yachts in the United States, starting in 1984 and only a small number were built. It is now out of production.

== Design ==
The Lancer 29 PS is a recreational keelboat, built predominantly of fiberglass, with wood trim. It has a fractional sloop, a sharply raked stem, a plumb transom and a fixed long keel. It displaces 6,800 lb (3,084 kg).

The boat has a draft of 5.25 ft (1.60 m) with the standard keel and is normally fitted with an outboard motor for cruising, docking and maneuvering.

The design has a hull speed of 6.43 kn (11.91 km/h).

== Operational history ==
In a review Bruce McArthur wrote, "like the other Lancer PS models, these boats were more of a hybrid power-sailboat than a sailing auxiliary or motorsailer and can accept large outboard motors. The Lancer 29 PS was not built in great numbers."

== See also ==
- List of sailing boat types
