= Lancer Yachts =

Sailboat manufacturer

- Company type: Privately held company
- Industry: Boat building
- Founded: 1974
- Founder: Richard Valdes
- Defunct: 1986
- Headquarters: Irvine, California, United States
- Key people: President: Richard Valdes; Executive Vice President: Maury Thrienen
- Products: Sailboats

The Lancer Yacht Corporation (usually called Lancer Yachts) was an American boat builder based in Irvine, California. The company specialized in the design and manufacture of fiberglass sailboats.

The company was founded by Richard Valdes in 1974 and continued in business until 1986. Valdes was the company president and his longtime associate Maury Thrienen was executive vice president.

== History ==
Valdez was the former president of Columbia Yachts when he launched Lancer Yachts, having founded Columbia in the late 1950s. Columbia built boats under contract for Islander Yachts. Valdez sold Columbia and then re-entered the sailboat business by forming Lancer Yachts. The new company worked in conjunction with the Endeavour Yacht Corporation, which had also been founded by Valdez and the two companies shared facilities. Some of the boats, including the Lancer 25, were actually built by Endeavor Yachts under contract to Lancer Yachts, at Endeavor's US east coast plant.

Many of the boats produced were designed as motorsailers and given a "PS" designation for "Power Sailer". These designs were intended to be powered by single or dual outboard motors, giving them speeds of up to 15 kn (28 km/h; 17 mph), while providing acceptable characteristics when sailing.

The first design produced was the Lancer 36, the prototype for which, named Chutzpah, was built in 1973, before Lancer Yachts was formed and won the Transpacific Yacht Race in 1973 and 1975. It was followed by the Lancer 25 in 1975. In a 2010 review Steve Henkel praised that design, writing, "the Lancer 25 has some features not commonly found in boats of this size ... Good standing headroom is achieved below, but only in part of the cabin..."

In 1983 the company was sold to Bally Manufacturing, with Valdez and Thrienen staying on as company president and vice president, respectively. Bally had intended to retain the company in the long term and offer customer financing though its other companies, however, Bally quickly sold the Lancer name and the tooling to Newport Offshore Yachts during the early 1980s recession. It is thought that production of Lancer boats had ended by 1986.

== Boats ==
Summary of boats built by Lancer Yachts:

- Lancer 36 - 1973
- Lancer 25 - 1975
- Lancer 28 - 1977
- Lancer 29-3 - 1977
- Lancer 30-2 - 1977
- Lancer 30-4 - 1978
- Lancer 30-3 - 1979
- Lancer 44 - 1979
- Lancer 30-5 - 1980
- Lancer 42 - 1980
- Lancer 45 - 1981
- Lancer 25 Mark V - 1982
- Lancer 28T Mark V - 1982
- Lancer 36 FR - 1982
- Lancer 39 - 1982
- Lancer 27 PS - 1983
- Lancer 40 - 1983
- Lancer 29 PS - 1984
- Lancer 25 PS - 1985

== See also ==
- List of sailboat designers and manufacturers
