= Lancer 25 =

Sailboat class

Development
- Designer: W. Shad Turner
- Location: United States
- Year: 1975
- Builders: Lancer Yacht Corp; Endeavour Yachts

Boat
- Displacement: 3,400 lb (1,542 kg)
- Draft: 2.33 ft (0.71 m)

Hull
- Type: monohull
- Construction: fiberglass
- LOA: 24.67 ft (7.52 m)
- LWL: 20.08 ft (6.12 m)
- Beam: 8.00 ft (2.44 m)
- Engine: outboard motor

Hull appendages
- Keel: fin keel
- Ballast: 1,200 lb (544 kg)
- Rudder: internally-mounted spade-type rudder

Rig
- Rig type: Bermuda rig

Sails
- Sailplan: masthead sloop
- Total sail area: 248.00 sq ft (23.040 m^{2})

Racing
- PHRF: 264

The Lancer 25 is an American trailerable sailboat that was designed by W. Shad Turner as a cruiser and first built in 1975.

The boat is a development of the Columbia T-23, which was designed by Alan Payne. The T-23 tooling was supplied by Richard Valdes, the co-founder of Columbia Yachts and founder of Lancer Yachts, who was the brother of Rob Valdes, one of the principals of Endeavour Yachts, who built the Lancer 25 under contract.

The Lancer 25 design was developed into the Lancer 25 Mark V in 1982.

The Lancer 25 PS is a motorsailer design with a new hull shape from the Lancer 25.

== Production ==
The design was actually built by Endeavour Yachts in the eastern United States, under contract to the Lancer Yacht Corp in the United States, both companies founded by Valdes. Production ran from 1975 until 1984.

== Design ==
The Lancer 25 is a recreational keelboat, built predominantly of fiberglass, with wood trim. It has a masthead sloop rig, a raked stem, an angled transom, an internally mounted spade-type rudder controlled by a tiller and a fixed shoal draft fin keel. The keel is wide and hollow to increase cabin space and height. The boat displaces 3,400 lb (1,542 kg) and carries 1,200 lb (544 kg) of lead ballast.

The boat has a draft of 2.33 ft (0.71 m) with the standard shallow draft keel.

The boat is normally fitted with a small 6 to 8 hp (4 to 6 kW) outboard motor for docking and maneuvering.

The design has sleeping accommodation for four to six people, with a short double "V"-berth in the bow cabin, two straight settee berths and two quarter berths in the main cabin. The galley is located on both sides, just forward of the companionway ladder. The galley is equipped with a two-burner stove to port, with an ice box and a sink to starboard. The stove flips over to form a navigation station on the port side. The head is located centered under the "V" berth in the bow cabin. Cabin headroom is 70 in (178 cm).

The design has a PHRF racing average handicap of 264 and a hull speed of 6.0 kn (11.1 km/h).

== Operational history ==
In a 2010 review Steve Henkel wrote, "the Lancer 25 has some features not commonly found in boats of this size, for example: berths for four with two quarter berths and two settee berths, all 6' 4" long, plus an optional mini-double V-berth forward over the head area—'mini' because the berth is only 6' 0" long; a standard bed ashore measures 6' 8". Also, the port side counter doubles as a nav work station when the stove is flipped to a counter-side-up position. Good standing headroom is achieved below, but only in part of the cabin ... Best features: The outstanding parameter of the Lancer ... is her headroom, 5' 10", which is gained by lowering part of the cabin sole down into the extra-wide keel cavity (18" at its widest). The remainder of the cabin sole, including the portion on which you would rest your feet while sitting on either settee berth, looks to be about 18 inches higher. Worst features: We have not seen this boat close up, but wonder if absent-minded or oblivious crew might not be in danger of falling into the keel cavity when arising from a settee. Also, the Lancer's 2' 4" keel is not deep enough to permit efficient sailing to windward."

== See also ==
- List of sailing boat types

Related development

- Lancer 25 Mark V
