= Lancer 42 =

Sailboat class

Development
- Designer: Herb David
- Location: United States
- Year: 1980
- Builder: Lancer Yachts
- Role: Motorsailer

Boat
- Displacement: 21,000 lb (9,525 kg)
- Draft: 6.00 ft (1.83 m)

Hull
- Type: monohull
- Construction: fiberglass
- LOA: 42.00 ft (12.80 m)
- LWL: 35.25 ft (10.74 m)
- Beam: 13.75 ft (4.19 m)
- Engine: Perkins Engines 4236 45 hp (34 kW) diesel engine

Hull appendages
- Keel: fin keel
- Ballast: 7,000 lb (3,175 kg)
- Rudder: skeg-mounted rudder

Rig
- Rig type: Bermuda rig
- I foretriangle height: 54.50 ft (16.61 m)
- J foretriangle base: 16.80 ft (5.12 m)
- P mainsail luff: 48.50 ft (14.78 m)
- E mainsail foot: 18.50 ft (5.64 m)

Sails
- Sailplan: masthead sloop
- Mainsail area: 448.63 sq ft (41.679 m^{2})
- Jib/genoa area: 457.80 sq ft (42.531 m^{2})
- Total sail area: 906.43 sq ft (84.210 m^{2})

The Lancer 42 is an American sailboat that was designed by Herb David as a motorsailer and cruiser, first built in 1980.

== Production ==
The design was built by Lancer Yachts in the United States from 1980 until 1983, but it is now out of production.

== Design ==
The Lancer 42 is a recreational keelboat, built predominantly of fiberglass, with wood trim. It has a masthead sloop rig, a highly raked stem, a plumb transom, a skeg-mounted rudder controlled by a wheel and a fixed fin keel. It displaces 21,000 lb (9,525 kg) and carries 7,000 lb (3,175 kg) of ballast.

The boat has a draft of 6.00 ft (1.83 m) with the standard keel .

The boat is fitted with a British Perkins Engines 4236 diesel engine of 45 hp (34 kW) for cruising, docking and maneuvering. The fuel tank holds 125 U.S. gallons (470 L; 104 imp gal) and the fresh water tank also has a capacity of 125 U.S. gallons (470 L; 104 imp gal).

The design has a hull speed of 7.95 kn (14.72 km/h).

== See also ==
- List of sailing boat types
