= Lancer 44 =

Sailboat class

Development
- Designer: Herb David
- Location: United States
- Year: 1979
- Builder: Lancer Yachts
- Role: Motorsailer

Boat
- Displacement: 21,000 lb (9,525 kg)
- Draft: 6.00 ft (1.83 m)

Hull
- Type: monohull
- Construction: fiberglass
- LOA: 44.16 ft (13.46 m)
- LWL: 35.25 ft (10.74 m)
- Beam: 13.75 ft (4.19 m)
- Engine: inboard engine

Hull appendages
- Keel: fin keel
- Ballast: 8,000 lb (3,629 kg)
- Rudder: skeg-mounted rudder

Rig
- Rig type: Bermuda rig
- I foretriangle height: 54.30 ft (16.55 m)
- J foretriangle base: 16.80 ft (5.12 m)
- P mainsail luff: 48.00 ft (14.63 m)
- E mainsail foot: 18.30 ft (5.58 m)

Sails
- Sailplan: masthead sloop
- Mainsail area: 439.20 sq ft (40.803 m^{2})
- Jib/genoa area: 456.12 sq ft (42.375 m^{2})
- Total sail area: 895.32 sq ft (83.178 m^{2})

The Lancer 44 is an American sailboat that was designed by Herb David as a motorsailer and first built in 1979.

== Production ==
The design was built by Lancer Yachts in the United States, between 1979 and 1982, but it is now out of production.

== Design ==
The Lancer 44 is a recreational keelboat, built predominantly of fiberglass. It has a masthead sloop rig, a raked stem, an angled transom with a swimming platform, a skeg-mounted rudder controlled by a wheel and a fixed fin keel. It displaces 21,000 lb (9,525 kg) and carries 8,000 lb (3,629 kg) of lead ballast.

The boat has a draft of 6.00 ft (1.83 m) with the standard keel and 4.92 ft (1.50 m) with the optional shoal draft keel. The boat is fitted with an inboard engine for cruising, docking and maneuvering.

The design has sleeping accommodation for four people, with a double berth in the bow cabin and double berth in a second cabin forward on the port side. The galley is located on the port side, amidships. A large salon is located aft. The head is located just aft of the bow cabin on the starboard side and includes a shower.

The design has a hull speed of 7.95 kn (14.72 km/h).

== See also ==
- List of sailing boat types
