= Lancer 27 PS =

Sailboat class

Development
- Designer: Herb David
- Location: United States
- Year: 1983
- Builder: Lancer Yachts
- Role: Motorsailer
- Name: Lancer 27 PS

Boat
- Displacement: 4,600 lb (2,087 kg)
- Draft: 4.30 ft (1.31 m)

Hull
- Type: monohull
- Construction: fiberglass
- LOA: 26.58 ft (8.10 m)
- LWL: 22.00 ft (6.71 m)
- Beam: 8.58 ft (2.62 m)
- Engine: outboard motor

Hull appendages
- Keel: fin keel
- Ballast: 1,700 lb (771 kg)
- Rudder: internally-mounted spade-type rudder

Rig
- Rig type: Bermuda rig
- I foretriangle height: 29.80 ft (9.08 m)
- J foretriangle base: 9.40 ft (2.87 m)
- P mainsail luff: 30.00 ft (9.14 m)
- E mainsail foot: 10.00 ft (3.05 m)

Sails
- Sailplan: fractional rigged sloop
- Mainsail area: 150.00 sq ft (13.935 m^{2})
- Jib/genoa area: 140.06 sq ft (13.012 m^{2})
- Total sail area: 290.06 sq ft (26.947 m^{2})

The Lancer 27 PS is an American sailboat that was designed by Herb David as a motorsailer and cruiser and first built in 1983. The PS designation indicates "Power Sailer".

== Production ==
The design was built by Lancer Yachts in the United States, from 1983 until 1985, but it is now out of production.

== Design ==
The Lancer 27 PS is a recreational keelboat, built predominantly of fiberglass, with wood trim. It has a fractional sloop rig, a sharply raked stem, a plumb transom wit a fixed swimming platform, an internally mounted spade-type rudder controlled by a wheel and a fixed fin keel. It displaces 4,600 lb (2,087 kg) and carries 1,700 lb (771 kg) of ballast.

The boat has a draft of 4.30 ft (1.31 m) with the standard keel. It can be fitted with an outboard motor of up to 200 hp (149 kW) for cruising, docking and maneuvering.

The design has sleeping accommodation for four people, with a double "V"-berth in the bow cabin around a drop-down table and an aft cabin with a transversely-mounted double berth. The galley is located on the starboard side just forward of the companionway ladder. The galley is L-shaped and is equipped with a stove, icebox and a sink. The head is located opposite the gallery on the port side.

The design has a hull speed of 6.29 kn (11.65 km/h).

== See also ==
- List of sailing boat types
