= Lancer 45 =

Sailboat class

Development
- Designer: Herb David
- Location: United States
- Year: 1981
- Builder: Lancer Yachts
- Role: Motorsailer

Boat
- Displacement: 24,000 lb (10,886 kg)
- Draft: 4.90 ft (1.49 m)

Hull
- Type: monohull
- Construction: fiberglass
- LOA: 45.00 ft (13.72 m)
- LWL: 37.25 ft (11.35 m)
- Beam: 13.75 ft (4.19 m)
- Engine: inboard motor

Hull appendages
- Keel: fin keel
- Ballast: 7,000 lb (3,175 kg)
- Rudder: skeg-mounted rudder

Rig
- Rig type: Bermuda rig
- I foretriangle height: 54.30 ft (16.55 m)
- J foretriangle base: 16.80 ft (5.12 m)
- P mainsail luff: 48.00 ft (14.63 m)
- E mainsail foot: 18.80 ft (5.73 m)

Sails
- Sailplan: masthead sloop
- Mainsail area: 451.20 sq ft (41.918 m^{2})
- Jib/genoa area: 456.12 sq ft (42.375 m^{2})
- Total sail area: 907.32 sq ft (84.293 m^{2})

The Lancer 45 is an American sailboat that was designed by Herb David as a motorsailer and first built in 1981.

== Production ==
The design was built by Lancer Yachts in the United States, between 1981 and 1985, but it is now out of production.

== Design ==
The Lancer 45 is a recreational keelboat, built predominantly of fiberglass, with wood trim. It has a masthead sloop rig, a sharply raked stem, an angled transom with a fixed swimming platform, a skeg-mounted rudder controlled by a wheel, a center cockpit with an optional wheelhouse and a fixed fin keel. It displaces 24,000 lb (10,886 kg) and carries 7,000 lb (3,175 kg) of ballast.

The boat has a draft of 4.90 ft (1.49 m) with the standard keel.

The boat is fitted with an inboard diesel engine for cruising, docking and maneuvering. The fuel tank holds 125 U.S. gallons (470 L; 104 imp gal) and the fresh water tank has a capacity of 225 U.S. gallons (850 L; 187 imp gal).

The design has sleeping accommodation for six people, with a double berth in the bow cabin, a double berth in a forward cabin behind the bow cabin on the port side and a large aft cabin with a centered double berth. The galley is located on the port side aft of the companionway ladder. The galley is equipped with a two-burner stove and a double sink. A navigation station is opposite the galley, on the starboard side. There are two heads, one just aft of the bow cabin on the starboard side and one on the starboard side forward of the aft cabin.

The design has a hull speed of 8.18 kn (15.15 km/h).

== See also ==
- List of sailing boat types
