= Lancer 25 PS =

Sailboat class

Development
- Designer: Herb David
- Location: United States
- Year: 1985
- Builder: Lancer Yacht Corp
- Role: Motorsailer
- Name: Lancer 25 PS

Boat
- Displacement: 3,500 lb (1,588 kg)
- Draft: 3.33 ft (1.01 m)

Hull
- Type: monohull
- Construction: fiberglass
- LOA: 24.67 ft (7.52 m)
- LWL: 20.25 ft (6.17 m)
- Beam: 8.00 ft (2.44 m)
- Engine: outboard motor

Hull appendages
- Keel: fin keel
- Ballast: 1,250 lb (567 kg)
- Rudder: internally-mounted spade-type rudder

Rig
- Rig type: Bermuda rig
- I foretriangle height: 29.00 ft (8.84 m)
- J foretriangle base: 8.75 ft (2.67 m)
- P mainsail luff: 29.00 ft (8.84 m)
- E mainsail foot: 10.60 ft (3.23 m)

Sails
- Sailplan: fractional rigged sloop
- Mainsail area: 153.70 sq ft (14.279 m^{2})
- Jib/genoa area: 126.88 sq ft (11.788 m^{2})
- Total sail area: 280.58 sq ft (26.067 m^{2})

The Lancer 25 PS is an American trailerable sailboat that was designed by Herb David as a motorsailer and first built in 1985. The "PS" designation stands for "Power Sailer".

The Lancer 25 PS has a different hull shape from the Lancer 25 and the Lancer 25 Mark V.

== Production ==
The design was built by Lancer Yachts in the United States, starting in 1985, but it is now out of production.

== Design ==
The Lancer 25 PS is a recreational keelboat, built predominantly of fiberglass, with wood trim. It has a fractional sloop rig, a raked stem, an angled transom, an internally mounted spade-type rudder controlled by a wheel and a fixed fin keel. It displaces 3,500 lb (1,588 kg) and carries 1,250 lb (567 kg) of ballast. The boat has a draft of 3.33 ft (1.01 m) with the standard keel.

As a motorsailer, the boat is normally fitted with a large outboard motor.

The design has sleeping accommodation for four people, with a double "V"-berth in the bow cabin around a drop-table and an aft cabin with a transversal double berth. The galley is located on the starboard side just forward of the companionway ladder. The galley is equipped with a stove, icebox and a sink. The head is located opposite the galley on the port side and includes a shower. The fresh water tank has a capacity of 20 U.S. gallons (76 L; 17 imp gal).

The design has a hull speed of 6.03 kn (11.17 km/h).

== See also ==
- List of sailing boat types
