= Lancer 25 Mark V =

Sailboat class

Development
- Designer: W. Shad Turner
- Location: United States
- Year: 1983
- Builder: Lancer Yacht Corp
- Role: Cruiser
- Name: Lancer 25 Mark V

Boat
- Displacement: 3,400 lb (1,542 kg)
- Draft: 2.33 ft (0.71 m)

Hull
- Type: monohull
- Construction: fiberglass
- LOA: 24.67 ft (7.52 m)
- LWL: 20.08 ft (6.12 m)
- Beam: 8.00 ft (2.44 m)
- Engine: outboard motor

Hull appendages
- Keel: fin keel
- Ballast: 1,200 lb (544 kg)
- Rudder: internally-mounted spade-type rudder

Rig
- Rig type: Bermuda rig

Sails
- Sailplan: fractional rigged sloop

The Lancer 25 Mark V is an American trailerable sailboat that was designed by W. Shad Turner as a cruiser and first built in 1983.

The Lancer 25 Mark V is a development of the Lancer 25.

The Lancer 25 PS is a motorsailer design with a new hull shape from the Lancer 25 Mark V.

== Production ==
The design was built by the Lancer Yacht Corp in the United States, starting in 1983, but it is now out of production.

== Design ==
The Lancer 25 Mark V is a recreational keelboat, built predominantly of fiberglass, with wood trim. It has a fractional sloop rig, a raked stem, an angled transom, an internally mounted spade-type rudder controlled by a tiller and a fixed shoal draft fin keel. It displaces 3,400 lb (1,542 kg) and carries 1,200 lb (544 kg) of ballast.

The boat has a draft of 2.33 ft (0.71 m) with the standard shoal draft keel.

The boat is normally fitted with a small outboard motor for docking and maneuvering.

The design has sleeping accommodation for five people, with a straight settee a berth and a drop-down dinette table double berth in the main cabin and two single aft cabins. The galley is located on both sides, just forward of the companionway ladder. The galley is equipped with a two-burner stove to port and a sink and ice box to starboard. The enclosed head is located in the forepeak.

The design has a hull speed of 6.0 kn (11.1 km/h).

== See also ==
- List of sailing boat types

Related development

- Lancer 25
