= Beneteau Evasion 37 =

Sailboat class

Development
- Designer: André Bénéteau
- Location: France
- Year: 1980
- Builder: Beneteau
- Role: Motorsailer
- Name: Beneteau Evasion 37

Boat
- Displacement: 17,637 lb (8,000 kg)
- Draft: 7.75 ft (2.36 m) with centreboard down

Hull
- Type: monohull
- Construction: glassfibre
- LOA: 37.17 ft (11.33 m)
- LWL: 31.30 ft (9.54 m)
- Beam: 11.75 ft (3.58 m)
- Engine: Perkins Engines 4-108 40 hp (30 kW) diesel engine

Hull appendages
- Keel: Fin keel and centreboard
- Ballast: 5,000 lb (2,268 kg)
- Rudder: Skeg-mounted rudder

Rig
- Rig type: Masthead ketch rig

Sails
- Sailplan: Ketch rigged
- Mainsail area: 279 sq ft (25.9 m^{2})
- Jib/genoa area: 495 sq ft (46.0 m^{2})
- Other sails: mizzen: 95 sq ft (8.8 m^{2}) storm jib: 108 sq ft (10.0 m^{2})
- Upwind sail area: 869 sq ft (80.7 m^{2})

The Beneteau Evasion 37 is a French sailboat that was designed by André Bénéteau as a blue water motorsailer and first built in 1980.

== Production ==
The design was built by Beneteau in France, starting in 1980, but it is now out of production.

== Design ==
The Evasion 37 is a recreational keelboat, built predominantly of glassfibre, with wood trim. The hull is solid fibreglass and the deck is balsa-cored. It has a masthead ketch rig, with a deck-stepped mast, one set of unswept spreaders and aluminium spars with continuous stainless steel wire standing rigging. The hull has a raked stem, an angled transom, an skeg-mounted rudder controlled by a two wheels, one in the cockpit and one in the wheelhouse. It has a fixed stub fin keel and a retractable steel centreboard. It displaces 17,637 lb (8,000 kg) and carries 5,000 lb (2,268 kg) of exterior cast iron ballast.

The boat has a draft of 7.75 ft (2.36 m) with the centreboard extended and 4.07 ft (1.24 m) with it retracted, allowing operation in shallow water.

The boat is fitted with a British Perkins Engines 4-108 diesel engine of 40 or 60 hp (30 or 45 kW) for docking and manoeuvring. The fuel tank holds 75 U.S. gallons (280 L; 62 imp gal) and the fresh water tank has a capacity of 150 U.S. gallons (570 L; 120 imp gal).

The design has sleeping accommodation for four people, with a double berth in the aft cabin, two U-shaped settees in the main salon and a midship cabin with a double berth on the starboard side. The galley is located on the port side of the wheelhouse, just forward of the companionway ladder. The galley is of straight configuration and is equipped with a two-burner stove, a refrigerator and a double sink. A navigation and steering station is opposite the galley, on the starboard side. There are two heads, one in the forepeak and one on the port side, aft.

The design has a hull speed of 7.50 kn (13.89 km/h).

== See also ==
- List of sailing boat types
