= Espace 800 =

Sailboat class

Development
- Designer: Philippe Briand
- Location: France
- Year: 1981
- Builder: Jeanneau
- Role: Motorsailer

Boat
- Displacement: 7,716 lb (3,500 kg)
- Draft: 6.07 ft (1.85 m) with centerboard down

Hull
- Type: monohull
- Construction: fiberglass
- LOA: 26.25 ft (8.00 m)
- LWL: 20.51 ft (6.25 m)
- Beam: 9.84 ft (3.00 m)
- Engine: inboard engine

Hull appendages
- Keel: stub keel and centerboard
- Ballast: 2,646 lb (1,200 kg)
- Rudder: spade-type rudder

Rig
- Rig type: Bermuda rig

Sails
- Sailplan: fractional rigged sloop
- Total sail area: 430.00 sq ft (39.948 m^{2})

The Espace 800 (English: Space) is a French sailboat that was designed by Philippe Briand as a cruising motorsailer and first built in 1981. The boat is part of the Espace series of cruising sailboats and its designation indicates its length overall in centimeters.

== Production ==
The design was built by Jeanneau in France, from 1981 to 1984, but it is now out of production.

== Design ==
The Espace 800 is a recreational keelboat, built predominantly of fiberglass. It has a fractional sloop rig, with a single set of spreaders and aluminum spars with stainless steel wire rigging. The mainsheet is rigged to a cockpit arch. The hull has a raked stem, a reverse transom, an internally mounted spade-type rudder controlled by a wheel and a fixed stub keel with a retractable centerboard. It displaces 7,716 lb (3,500 kg) and carries 2,646 lb (1,200 kg) of ballast.

The boat has a draft of 6.07 ft (1.85 m) with the centerboard extended and 3.22 ft (0.98 m) with it retracted, allowing operation in shallow water or ground transportation on a trailer.

The boat is fitted with an inboard engine for docking and maneuvering. The fuel tank holds 29 U.S. gallons (110 L; 24 imp gal) and the fresh water tank has a capacity of 25 U.S. gallons (95 L; 21 imp gal).

The design has sleeping accommodation for five people, with a double "V"-berth in the bow cabin, an L-shaped settee and a straight settee in the main cabin. The galley is located on the port side amidships. The galley is equipped with a two-burner stove and a sink. The head is located just aft of the bow cabin on the starboard side and includes a shower.

The design has a hull speed of 6.07 kn (11.24 km/h).

== See also ==
- List of sailing boat types
