= Lancer 30 Mark II =

Sailboat class

Development
- Designer: C&C Design
- Location: United States
- Year: 1977
- Builder: Lancer Yachts
- Role: Cruiser
- Name: Lancer 30 Mark II

Boat
- Displacement: 7,000 lb (3,175 kg)
- Draft: 4.50 ft (1.37 m)

Hull
- Type: monohull
- Construction: fiberglass
- LOA: 29.50 ft (8.99 m)
- LWL: 22.50 ft (6.86 m)
- Beam: 9.83 ft (3.00 m)

Hull appendages
- Keel: fin keel
- Ballast: 3,000 lb (1,361 kg)
- Rudder: internally-mounted spade-type rudder

Rig
- Rig type: Bermuda rig
- I foretriangle height: 35.00 ft (10.67 m)
- J foretriangle base: 12.00 ft (3.66 m)
- P mainsail luff: 30.00 ft (9.14 m)
- E mainsail foot: 10.00 ft (3.05 m)

Sails
- Sailplan: masthead sloop
- Mainsail area: 150.00 sq ft (13.935 m^{2})
- Jib/genoa area: 210.00 sq ft (19.510 m^{2})
- Total sail area: 360.00 sq ft (33.445 m^{2})

The Lancer 30 Mark II, or Lancer 30-2, is an American sailboat that was designed by the Canadian design firm C&C Design as a cruiser and first built in 1977.

Like the Lancer 29 Mark III, the Lancer 30 Mark II is a development of the C&C 30 which itself was built in Mark I and II versions.

== Production ==
The design was built by Lancer Yachts in the United States between 1977 and 1982, but it is now out of production.

== Design ==
The Lancer 30 Mark II is a recreational keelboat, built predominantly of fiberglass, with wood trim. It has a masthead sloop rig, an internally mounted spade-type rudder and a fixed fin keel. It displaces 7,000 lb (3,175 kg) and carries 3,000 lb (1,361 kg) of ballast.

The boat has a draft of 4.50 ft (1.37 m) with the standard keel.

The design has a hull speed of 6.36 kn (11.78 km/h).

== See also ==
- List of sailing boat types
