= Lancer 40 =

Sailboat class

Development
- Designer: Herb David
- Location: United States
- Year: 1983
- Builder: Lancer Yachts
- Role: Motorsailer

Boat
- Displacement: 15,500 lb (7,031 kg)
- Draft: 6.30 ft (1.92 m)

Hull
- Type: monohull
- Construction: fiberglass
- LOA: 40.00 ft (12.19 m)
- LWL: 33.67 ft (10.26 m)
- Beam: 12.00 ft (3.66 m)
- Engine: inboard motor

Hull appendages
- Keel: fin keel
- Ballast: 4,500 lb (2,041 kg)
- Rudder: skeg-mounted rudder

Rig
- Rig type: Bermuda rig
- I foretriangle height: 49.50 ft (15.09 m)
- J foretriangle base: 14.80 ft (4.51 m)
- P mainsail luff: 43.00 ft (13.11 m)
- E mainsail foot: 15.00 ft (4.57 m)

Sails
- Sailplan: masthead sloop
- Mainsail area: 322.50 sq ft (29.961 m^{2})
- Jib/genoa area: 366.30 sq ft (34.030 m^{2})
- Total sail area: 688.80 sq ft (63.992 m^{2})

The Lancer 40 is an American sailboat that was designed by Herb David as a motorsailer and cruiser and first built in 1983.

== Production ==
The design was built by Lancer Yachts in the United States, between 1983 and 1985, but it is now out of production.

== Design ==
The Lancer 40 is a recreational keelboat, built predominantly of fiberglass, with wood trim. It has a masthead sloop rig, a center cockpit, a raked stem, an angled transom, with a fixed swimming platform, a skeg-mounted rudder controlled by a wheel and a fixed fin keel. It displaces 15,500 lb (7,031 kg) and carries 4,500 lb (2,041 kg) of ballast.

The boat has a draft of 6.30 ft (1.92 m) with the standard keel and is fitted with an inboard motor for cruising, docking and maneuvering.

The design has a hull speed of 7.77 kn (14.39 km/h).

== See also ==
- List of sailing boat types
