= Lancer 39 =

Sailboat class

Development
- Designer: Herb David
- Location: United States
- Year: 1982
- Builder: Lancer Yachts
- Role: Cruiser

Boat
- Displacement: 16,000 lb (7,257 kg)
- Draft: 5.67 ft (1.73 m)

Hull
- Type: monohull
- Construction: fiberglass
- LOA: 39.00 ft (11.89 m)
- LWL: 33.50 ft (10.21 m)
- Beam: 12.00 ft (3.66 m)
- Engine: inboard motor

Hull appendages
- Keel: fin keel
- Ballast: 3,500 lb (1,588 kg)
- Rudder: skeg-mounted rudder

Rig
- Rig type: Bermuda rig

Sails
- Sailplan: masthead sloop

The Lancer 39 is an American sailboat that was designed by Herb David as an motorsailer and a cruiser and first built in 1982.

== Production ==
The design was built by Lancer Yachts in the United States, from 1982 to 1983, but it is now out of production.

== Design ==
The Lancer 39 is a recreational keelboat, built predominantly of fiberglass, with wood trim. It has a masthead sloop rig, a raked stem, a plumb transom, with a fixed swimming platform, a pilothouse, a skeg-mounted rudder controlled by a wheel and a fixed fin keel. It displaces 16,000 lb (7,257 kg) and carries 3,500 lb (1,588 kg) of ballast.

The boat has a draft of 5.67 ft (1.73 m) with the standard keel and is fitted with an inboard engine for cruising, docking and maneuvering.

The design has a hull speed of 7.76 kn (14.37 km/h).

== See also ==
- List of sailing boat types
