= Beneteau Evasion 32 =

Sailboat class

Development
- Designer: André Bénéteau
- Location: France
- Year: 1973
- No. built: 286
- Builder: Beneteau
- Role: Motorsailer
- Name: Beneteau Evasion 32

Boat
- Displacement: 12,676 lb (5,750 kg)
- Draft: 4.50 ft (1.37 m)

Hull
- Type: monohull
- Construction: glassfibre
- LOA: 31.82 ft (9.70 m)
- LWL: 23.95 ft (7.30 m)
- Beam: 9.84 ft (3.00 m)
- Engine: Renault 30 hp (22 kW) diesel engine

Hull appendages
- Keel: long keel
- Ballast: 3,968 lb (1,800 kg)
- Rudder: Keel-mounted rudder

Rig
- Rig type: Masthead staysail ketch rig

Sails
- Sailplan: Ketch
- Mainsail area: 153 sq ft (14.2 m^{2})
- Jib/genoa area: 44 sq ft (4.1 m^{2})
- Spinnaker area: 603 sq ft (56.0 m^{2})
- Other sails: genoa: 301 sq ft (28.0 m^{2}) storm jib: 15 sq ft (1.4 m^{2}); Mizzen: 70 sq ft (6.5 m^{2}); Mizzen staysail: 135 sq ft (12.5 m^{2})
- Upwind sail area: 524 sq ft (48.7 m^{2})
- Downwind sail area: 960 sq ft (89 m^{2})

The Beneteau Evasion 32 is a French sailboat that was designed by André Bénéteau as an motorsailer and first built in 1973. The design was the first produced of the series of Evasion motorsailers. It was sold in the United States as the Beneteau M/S 32.

== Production ==
The design was built by Beneteau in France from 1973 to 1981, with 286 boats completed.

== Design ==
The Evasion 32 is a recreational keelboat, built predominantly of glassfibre, with wood trim. The hull is solid fibreglass and the deck is balsa-cored. It has a masthead staysail ketch rig, with a deck-stepped mast, one set of unswept spreaders on each mast and aluminium spars with continuous stainless steel wire standing rigging. The hull has a raked stem plumb stem, a slightly angled transom, a keel-mounted rudder controlled by a wheel in the wheelhouse and a tiller in the cockpit. The boat has a fixed long keel and displaces 12,676 lb (5,750 kg), carrying 3,968 lb (1,800 kg) of cast iron ballast.

The boat has a draft of 4.50 ft (1.37 m) with the standard keel.

The boat is fitted with a French Renault diesel engine of 30 or 55 hp (22 or 41 kW) for docking and manoeuvring. The fuel tank holds 32 U.S. gallons (120 L; 27 imp gal) and the fresh water tank has a capacity of 53 U.S. gallons (200 L; 44 imp gal).

The design has sleeping accommodation for six people, with a double "V"-berth berth in the bow cabin and two U-shaped settees around drop down tables in the main salon and wheelhouse. The galley is located on the port side of the main salon in the wheelhouse, just forward of the companionway ladder. The galley is of straight configuration and is equipped with a two-burner stove, an icebox and a sink. A navigation and steering station is forward of the galley, on the port side, although it lacks a chart table. The head is located on the port side of the salon. Cabin maximum headroom is 72 in (183 cm).

For sailing downwind the design may be equipped with a symmetrical spinnaker of 603 sq ft (56.0 m^{2}).

The design has a hull speed of 6.56 kn (12.15 km/h).

== Operational history ==
In a 2009 review, Yachting Monthly reported, "André Bénéteau launched this design in 1973 – the first cruising yacht of any size produced by his company. She was a long-keeled, wheelhouse motorsailer and was, in some ways, ahead of her time."

In a 2023 SailBoats News used boat review, Emmanuel Van Deth wrote, "the particularity of this design is that it is resolutely classic with its ketch rig, its long keel and its interior wheelhouse. Nevertheless, this model has its own personality and still pleases, more than 40 years after its launch! Comfortable, it allows life on board. But the performance under sail is limited. The powerful engine is logically appreciated ... But what is missing? Modern appendages, an open cockpit, a modern rig - everything!"

== See also ==
- List of sailing boat types
