= Lancer 36 FR =

Sailboat class

Development
- Designer: Bill Lee
- Location: United States
- Year: 1982
- Builder: Lancer Yachts
- Role: Cruiser
- Name: Lancer 36 FR

Boat
- Displacement: 10,500 lb (4,763 kg)
- Draft: 6.20 ft (1.89 m)

Hull
- Type: monohull
- Construction: fiberglass
- LOA: 36.17 ft (11.02 m)
- LWL: 29.00 ft (8.84 m)
- Beam: 11.75 ft (3.58 m)
- Engine: inboard motor

Hull appendages
- Keel: fin keel
- Ballast: 4,000 lb (1,814 kg)
- Rudder: internally-mounted spade-type rudder

Rig
- Rig type: Bermuda rig
- I foretriangle height: 42.20 ft (12.86 m)
- J foretriangle base: 13.70 ft (4.18 m)
- P mainsail luff: 45.30 ft (13.81 m)
- E mainsail foot: 16.30 ft (4.97 m)

Sails
- Sailplan: fractional rigged sloop
- Mainsail area: 369.20 sq ft (34.300 m^{2})
- Jib/genoa area: 289.07 sq ft (26.855 m^{2})
- Total sail area: 658.27 sq ft (61.155 m^{2})

The Lancer 36 FR (Fractional Rig) is an American sailboat that was designed by Bill Lee as a cruiser and first built in 1982.

The Lancer 36 FR is a development of the Lancer 36, with the fractional rig designed by Bruce Farr. The Lancer 36 FR was originally marketed by the manufacturer as the Lancer 36, but is now usually referred to as the Lancer 36 FR to differentiate it from the 1973 design from which it was derived.

== Production ==
The design was built by Lancer Yachts in the United States from 1982 until 1985, but it is now out of production.

== Design ==
The Lancer 36 FR is a recreational keelboat, built predominantly of fiberglass, with wood trim. It has a fractional sloop rig, a raked stem, a reverse transom, an internally mounted spade-type rudder controlled by a wheel and a fixed fin keel. It displaces 10,500 lb (4,763 kg) and carries 4,000 lb (1,814 kg) of ballast.

The boat has a draft of 6.20 ft (1.89 m) with the standard keel. It is fitted with an inboard diesel engine for docking and maneuvering.

The design has sleeping accommodation for six people, with two straight settees in the main cabin and two aft cabins with double berths. The galley is located on the port side just forward of the companionway ladder. The galley is equipped with a two-burner stove and a sink. A navigation station is opposite the galley, on the starboard side. The head is located just aft of the bow storage area.

For sailing downwind the design may be equipped with a symmetrical spinnaker.

The design has a hull speed of 7.22 kn (13.37 km/h).

== See also ==
- List of sailing boat types
