= Variable-pitch propeller (marine) =

Propeller with blades that can be rotated to control their pitch while in use

In marine propulsion, a variable-pitch propeller is a type of propeller with blades that can be rotated around their long axis to change the blade pitch. Reversible propellers—those where the pitch can be set to negative values—can also create reverse thrust for braking or going backwards without the need to change the direction of shaft revolution.

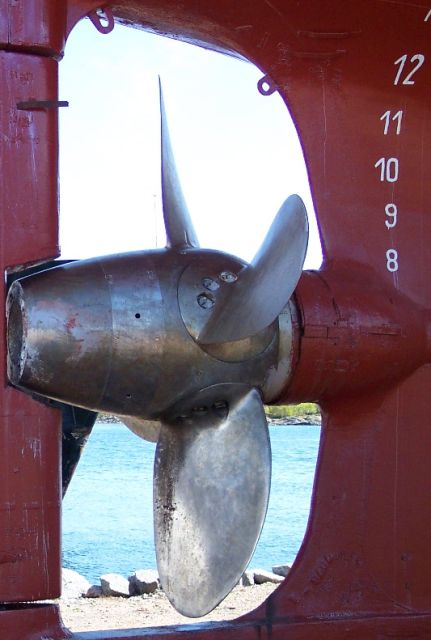
A ship's variable-pitch propeller

A controllable pitch propeller (CPP) can be efficient for the full range of rotational speeds and load conditions, since its pitch will be varied to absorb the maximum power that the engine is capable of producing. When fully loaded, a vessel will need more propulsion power than when empty. By varying the propeller blades to the optimal pitch, higher efficiency can be obtained, thus saving fuel. A vessel with a VPP can accelerate faster from a standstill and can decelerate much more effectively, making stopping quicker and safer. A CPP can also improve vessel maneuverability by directing a stronger flow of water onto the rudder.

However, a fixed pitch propeller (FPP) is both cheaper and more robust than a CPP. Also, an FPP is typically more efficient than a CPP for a single specific rotational speed and load condition. Accordingly, vessels that normally operate at a standard speed (such as large bulk carriers, tankers and container ships) will have an FPP optimized for that speed. At the other extreme, a canal narrowboat will have a FPP for two reasons: speed is limited to 4 mph (to protect the canal bank), and the propeller needs to be robust (when encountering underwater obstacles).

Vessels with medium or high speed diesel or gasoline engines use a reduction gear to reduce the engine output speed to an optimal propeller speed—although the large low speed diesels, whose cruising RPM is in the 80 to 120 range, are usually direct drive with direct-reversing engines. While an FPP-equipped vessel needs either a reversing gear or a reversible engine to reverse, a CPP vessel may not. On a large ship the CPP requires a hydraulic system to control the position of the blades. Compared to an FPP, a CPP is more efficient in reverse as the blades' leading edges remain as such in reverse also, so that the hydrodynamic cross-sectional shape is optimal for forward propulsion and satisfactory for reverse operations.

In the mid-1970s, Uljanik Shipyard in Yugoslavia produced four VLCCs with CPPs – a tanker and three ore/oil carriers – each powered by two 20,000 bhp B & W diesel engines directly driving Kamewa variable-pitch propellers. Due to the high construction cost none of these vessels ever returned a profit over their lifetimes. For these vessels, fixed variable-pitch propellers would have been more appropriate.

Controllable-pitch propellers are usually found on harbour or ocean-going tugs, dredgers, cruise ships, ferries, cargo vessels and larger fishing vessels. Prior to the development of CPPs, some vessels would alternate between "speed wheel" and "power wheel" propellers depending on the task. Current VPP designs can tolerate a maximum output of 44000 kW (60,000 hp).

== Sail boats ==
A sailboat or motorsailer when voyaging on sail alone will benefit from reduced drag, and just like an aeronautical propeller, a marine VPP may be "feathered" to give the least water resistance when sailing without using power. A VPP is particularly useful when motorsailing (i.e. voyaging under both power and sail), as the VPP can be coarsened to incorporate the wind component. If the prop remained at the "normal" setting, it would be too fine and the engine would provide little useful contribution; but by coarsening the prop, the engine provides useful thrust, resulting in a higher speed yet reduced fuel consumption because of the sailing component resistance.

== See also ==
- Variable-pitch propeller (aeronautics)
