= Beneteau Evasion 28 =

Sailboat class

Development
- Designer: André Bénéteau
- Location: France
- Year: 1975
- No. built: 123
- Builder: Beneteau
- Role: Motorsailer
- Name: Beneteau Evasion 28

Boat
- Displacement: 9,480 lb (4,300 kg)
- Draft: 4.10 ft (1.25 m)

Hull
- Type: monohull
- Construction: glassfibre
- LOA: 27.89 ft (8.50 m)
- LWL: 21.65 ft (6.60 m)
- Beam: 9.35 ft (2.85 m)
- Engine: Volvo MD11C diesel engine

Hull appendages
- Keel: Long keel
- Ballast: 3,086 lb (1,400 kg)
- Rudder: Keel-mounted rudder

Rig
- Rig type: Bermuda rig

Sails
- Sailplan: Masthead sloop
- Mainsail area: 170 sq ft (16 m^{2})
- Jib/genoa area: 117 sq ft (10.9 m^{2})
- Spinnaker area: 614 sq ft (57.0 m^{2})
- Other sails: genoa: 307 sq ft (28.5 m^{2}) storm jib: 46 sq ft (4.3 m^{2})
- Upwind sail area: 477 sq ft (44.3 m^{2})
- Downwind sail area: 784 sq ft (72.8 m^{2})

The Beneteau Evasion 28 is a motorsailer built by Beneteau in France from 1975 to 1980, with 123 boats completed.

== Design ==
It was designed by André Bénéteau. The hull is solid fibreglass and the deck is balsa-cored. The hull has a raked stem, a slightly angled transom, a keel-mounted rudder controlled by a wheel in the wheelhouse and a tiller in the cockpit. The hull has a fixed long keel. The boat displaces 9,480 lb (4,300 kg) and carries 3,086 lb (1,400 kg) of cast iron ballast.

It has a masthead sloop rig, with a deck-stepped mast, one set of unswept spreaders and aluminium spars with continuous stainless steel wire standing rigging.

The boat has a draft of 4.10 ft (1.25 m) with the standard long keel.

The boat is fitted with a Swedish Volvo MD11C diesel engine for docking and maneuvering. The fuel tank holds 23.8 U.S. gallons (90 L; 19.8 imp gal) and the fresh water tank has a capacity of 52.8 U.S. gallons (200 L; 44.0 imp gal).

The design has sleeping accommodation for four people, with a double berth and a single berth in the main salon and an aft quarter berth on the starboard side. The galley is located on the port side of the wheelhouse. The galley is of straight configuration and is equipped with a two-burner stove and a sink. A navigation station is opposite the galley, on the starboard side. The head is located in the bow. Cabin headroom is 72 in (183 cm).

For sailing downwind the design may be equipped with a symmetrical spinnaker of 614 sq ft (57.0 m^{2}).

The design has a hull speed of 6.24 kn (11.56 km/h).

A Sailboat Value review noted, "underneath the elegant motor-sailor superstructures, the Evasion 28 hides a beautiful sailboat hull. Powerful, stiff, stable on its journey, goes well upwind, the Evasion 28 is an excellent sailing boat both in the breeze and light winds."
