= Beneteau Evasion 36 =

Sailboat class

Development
- Designer: Philippe Briand
- Location: France
- Year: 1990
- Builder: Beneteau
- Role: Motorsailer
- Name: Beneteau Evasion 36

Boat
- Displacement: 12,125 lb (5,500 kg)
- Draft: 4.75 ft (1.45 m)

Hull
- Type: monohull
- Construction: glassfibre
- LOA: 35.43 ft (10.80 m)
- LOH: 34.78 ft (10.60 m)
- LWL: 31.82 ft (9.70 m)
- Beam: 12.63 ft (3.85 m)
- Engine: Inboard 33 hp (25 kW) diesel engine

Hull appendages
- Keel: Fin keel
- Ballast: 4,630 lb (2,100 kg)
- Rudder: Spade-type rudder

Rig
- Rig type: Bermuda rig
- I foretriangle height: 44.30 ft (13.50 m)
- J foretriangle base: 11.00 ft (3.35 m)
- P mainsail luff: 38.50 ft (11.73 m)
- E mainsail foot: 14.90 ft (4.54 m)

Sails
- Sailplan: Masthead sloop
- Mainsail area: 280 sq ft (26 m^{2})
- Jib/genoa area: 398 sq ft (37.0 m^{2})
- Upwind sail area: 678 sq ft (63.0 m^{2})

The Beneteau Evasion 36 is a French sailboat that was designed by Philippe Briand as a motorsailer and first built in 1990. The 36 is the sole boat in the series designed by Briand.

== Production ==
The design was built by Beneteau in France, starting in 1990, but it is now out of production.

== Design ==
The Evasion 36 is a recreational keelboat, built predominantly of glassfibre, with wood trim. The hull is solid fibreglass and the deck is balsa-cored. It has a masthead sloop rig, with a deck-stepped mast, two sets of swept spreaders and aluminium spars with stainless steel wire standing rigging. The hull has a raked stem, a reverse transom, an internally mounted spade-type rudder controlled by two wheels, one in the cockpit and one in the wheelhouse and a fixed fin keel or optional wing keel. It displaces 12,125 lb (5,500 kg) and carries 4,630 lb (2,100 kg) of cast iron ballast.

The boat has a draft of 4.75 ft (1.45 m) with the standard fin keel and 4.83 ft (1.47 m) with the wing keel.

The boat is fitted with a inboard 33 hp (25 kW) diesel engine for docking and manoeuvring. The fuel tank holds 45 U.S. gallons (170 L; 37 imp gal) and the fresh water tank has a capacity of 119 U.S. gallons (450 L; 99 imp gal).

The design has sleeping accommodation for four people, with an offset double berth in the bow cabin, an L-shaped settee in the wheelhouse and an aft cabin with a double berth on the port side. The galley is located on the starboard side at the companionway ladder. The galley is L-shaped and is equipped with a two-burner stove, a refrigerator and a double sink. A navigation and steering station is forward the galley, on the starboard side. The head is located just aft of the bow cabin on the port side and includes a shower.

The design has a hull speed of 7.56 kn (14.00 km/h).

== Operational history ==
A 2009 review in Yachting Monthly noted, "Bénéteau returned to the Evasion wheelhouse concept in 1990 when this configuration was enjoying a revival. She was a sleeker, more substantial and much more modern boat than the rest of the range. Designed by Philippe Briand, who created the Océanis range, she can be thought of as a wheelhouse Océanis. The hull is full, shallow-bodied and fitted with a shallow-draught wing keel. She had a manageable rig with a roller-furling main as standard. The interior layout drew on the Evasion tradition with the galley, dinette and steering and navigation station in the wheelhouse and a double cabin in each end. She was built to the same standards as the Océanises with a good, if simple, finish over a sound structural base."

== See also ==
- List of sailing boat types
