= Beneteau Evasion 22 =

Sailboat class

Development
- Designer: André Bénéteau
- Location: France
- Year: 1980
- No. built: 278
- Builder: Beneteau
- Role: Motorsailer
- Name: Beneteau Evasion 22

Boat
- Displacement: 3,968 lb (1,800 kg)
- Draft: 3.28 ft (1.00 m)

Hull
- Type: monohull
- Construction: glassfibre
- LOA: 21.98 ft (6.70 m)
- LWL: 19.19 ft (5.85 m)
- Beam: 8.53 ft (2.60 m)
- Engine: Inboard 8 to 25 hp (6 to 19 kW) diesel engine

Hull appendages
- Keel: Fin keel
- Ballast: 1,609 lb (730 kg)
- Rudder: Transom-mounted rudder

Rig
- Rig type: Bermuda rig

Sails
- Sailplan: Masthead sloop
- Mainsail area: 125 sq ft (11.6 m^{2})
- Jib/genoa area: 116 sq ft (10.8 m^{2})
- Upwind sail area: 241 sq ft (22.4 m^{2})

The Beneteau Evasion 22 is a motorsailer first built in 1980. It was built by Beneteau in France until 1984, with 278 boats completed.

== Design ==
It was designed by André Bénéteau. The Evasion 22 is built predominantly of glassfibre, with wood trim. The hull is solid fibreglass and the deck is balsa-cored. It has a masthead sloop rig, with a deck-stepped mast, one set of unswept spreaders and aluminium spars with continuous stainless steel wire standing rigging. The hull has a raked stem, an angled transom, a transom-hung rudder controlled by a wheel internally in the pilot house and tiller in the cockpit. It has a fixed fin keel or optional dual bilge keels. The boat displaces 3,968 lb (1,800 kg) and carries 1,609 lb (730 kg) of ballast.

The design has a draft of 3.28 ft (1.00 m) with the standard fin keel and 2.79 ft (0.85 m) with the optional twin keels.

The boat is fitted with an inboard diesel engine of 8 to 25 hp (6 to 19 kW).

The design has sleeping accommodation for four people, with a double "V"-berth in the bow cabin and a drop down dinette table that forms a double berth in the pilot house. The galley is located on the port side just forward of the companionway ladder, aft of the steering station. The galley is of straight configuration and is equipped with a two-burner stove, an ice box and a sink. The head is located just aft of the bow cabin on the port side. Cabin headroom is 68 in (173 cm). The fresh water tank has a capacity of 13.2 U.S. gallons (50 L; 11.0 imp gal).

The design has a hull speed of 5.87 kn (10.87 km/h).

In a 2024 Practical Boat Owner review in writer Duncan Kent noted, "Beneteau’s Evasion 22 is a tough little motorsailer built well enough to withstand a North Sea crossing in fine weather, especially the fin keel model. What she lacks in length she gains in stability, her 40% ballast ratio keeping her nicely stiff in a blow and her flared bows keeping the spray off the decks."

A detailed review by Bolsa de Navegantes concluded, "the Beneteau Evasion 22 stands out as a well-rounded motorsailer, ideal for sailors seeking a compact vessel that doesn’t compromise on comfort or performance. Its thoughtful design, stable sailing characteristics, and practical accommodations make it a suitable choice for coastal cruising and weekend getaways."
