= Beneteau Evasion 25 =

French sailboat class

Development
- Designer: André Bénéteau
- Location: France
- Year: 1977
- No. built: 300
- Builder: Beneteau
- Role: Motorsailer
- Name: Beneteau Evasion 25

Boat
- Displacement: 6,063 lb (2,750 kg)
- Draft: 3.77 ft (1.15 m)

Hull
- Type: monohull
- Construction: glassfibre
- LOA: 26.9 ft (8.2 m) with bowsprit
- LWL: 21.33 ft (6.50 m)
- Beam: 8.73 ft (2.66 m)
- Engine: 12 or 25 hp (9 or 19 kW) diesel engine

Hull appendages
- Keel: Long keel
- Ballast: 1,764 lb (800 kg)
- Rudder: Keel-mounted rudder

Rig
- Rig type: Bermuda rig

Sails
- Sailplan: Masthead sloop
- Mainsail area: 145 sq ft (13.5 m^{2})
- Jib/genoa area: 87 sq ft (8.1 m^{2})
- Spinnaker area: 506 sq ft (47.0 m^{2})
- Other sails: genoa: 254 sq ft (23.6 m^{2}) solent: 147 sq ft (13.7 m^{2}) storm jib: 37 sq ft (3.4 m^{2})
- Upwind sail area: 399 sq ft (37.1 m^{2})
- Downwind sail area: 651 sq ft (60.5 m^{2})

The Beneteau Evasion 25 is a motorsailer. It was built by Beneteau in France, from 1977 to 1982, starting as a 1978 model year. About 300 boats were completed. It was sold in the United States as the Beneteau M/S 25.

== Design ==
It was designed by André Bénéteau. The hull is solid fibreglass and the deck is balsa-cored. It has a masthead sloop rig with a bowsprit, a deck-stepped mast, one set of unswept spreaders and aluminium spars with continuous stainless steel wire standing rigging. The hull has a raked stem, an angled transom, a keel-mounted rudder controlled by a wheel and a tiller and a fixed long keel. It displaces 6,063 lb (2,750 kg) and carries 1,764 lb (800 kg) of ballast.

The boat has a draft of 3.77 ft (1.15 m) with the standard long keel.

The boat is fitted with an inboard diesel engine of 12 or 25 hp (9 or 19 kW) for docking and manoeuvring. The fuel tank holds 13 U.S. gallons (49 L; 11 imp gal) and the fresh water tank has a capacity of 23 U.S. gallons (87 L; 19 imp gal).

The design has sleeping accommodation for five people, with a double "V"-berth berth in the bow cabin, a drop down dinette table that forms a double berth in the main salon and an aft quarter berth on the port side. The galley is located on the port side just forward of the companionway ladder. The galley is of straight configuration and is equipped with a two-burner stove, an ice box and a sink. The head is located just aft of the bow cabin. Cabin headroom is 68 in (173 cm).

For sailing downwind the design may be equipped with a symmetrical spinnaker of 506 sq ft (47.0 m^{2}).

The design has a hull speed of 5.95 kn (11.02 km/h).
