= Beneteau Evasion 34 =

Sailboat class

Development
- Designer: André Bénéteau
- Location: France
- Year: 1980
- No. built: 180
- Builder: Beneteau
- Role: Motorsailer
- Name: Beneteau Evasion 34

Boat
- Displacement: 12,125 lb (5,500 kg)
- Draft: 5.09 ft (1.55 m)

Hull
- Type: monohull
- Construction: glassfibre
- LOA: 35.76 ft (10.90 m)
- LWL: 29.20 ft (8.90 m)
- Beam: 11.42 ft (3.48 m)
- Engine: inboard 30 or 50 hp (22 or 37 kW) diesel engine

Hull appendages
- Keel: Fin keel
- Ballast: 4,850 lb (2,200 kg)
- Rudder: Skeg-mounted rudder

Rig
- Rig type: Cutter rig

Sails
- Sailplan: Cutter
- Mainsail area: 237 sq ft (22.0 m^{2})
- Jib/genoa area: 241 sq ft (22.4 m^{2})
- Spinnaker area: 969 sq ft (90.0 m^{2})
- Other sails: genoa: 427 sq ft (39.7 m^{2}) storm jib: 65 sq ft (6.0 m^{2})
- Upwind sail area: 664 sq ft (61.7 m^{2})
- Downwind sail area: 1,206 sq ft (112.0 m^{2})

The Beneteau Evasion 34 is a French sailboat that was designed by André Bénéteau as a motorsailer and first built in 1980.

== Production ==
The design was built by Beneteau in France, from 1980 to 1984, with 180 boats completed, but it is now out of production.

== Design ==
The Evasion 34 is a recreational keelboat, built predominantly of glassfibre, with wood trim. The hull is solid fibreglass and the deck is balsa-cored. It has a cutter rig, with a deck-stepped mast, one set of unswept spreaders and aluminium spars with continuous stainless steel wire standing rigging. A ketch rig was optional. The hull has a raked stem, an angled transom, a skeg-mounted rudder controlled by two wheels, one in the wheelhouse and one in the cockpit. It has a fixed fin keel or optional stub keel with a steel centreboard. It displaces 12,125 lb (5,500 kg) and carries 4,850 lb (2,200 kg) of cast iron ballast.

The keel-equipped version of the boat has a draft of 5.09 ft (1.55 m), while the centerboard-equipped version has a draft of 7.07 ft (2.15 m) with the centerboard extended and 3.94 ft (1.20 m) with it retracted, allowing operation in shallow water.

The boat is fitted with a inboard 30 or 50 hp (22 or 37 kW) diesel engine for docking and manoeuvring. The fuel tank holds 52.8 U.S. gallons (200 L; 44.0 imp gal) and the fresh water tank has a capacity of 79.3 U.S. gallons (300 L; 66.0 imp gal).

The design has sleeping accommodation for eight people, with a double "V"-berth in the bow cabin, a double berth in the midship cabin, a U-shaped settee around a table in the wheelhouse that converts to a double berth and an aft cabin with a double berth on the port side. The galley is located on the starboard side of the wheelhouse, aft. The galley is L-shaped and is equipped with a three-burner stove, a refrigerator and a double sink. A navigation station is forward of the galley, on the starboard side. The head is located just aft of the bow cabin on the starboard side and includes a shower. Cabin maximum headroom is 71 in (180 cm).

For sailing downwind the design may be equipped with a symmetrical spinnaker of 969 sq ft (90.0 m^{2}).

The design has a hull speed of 7.20 kn (13.33 km/h).

== See also ==
- List of sailing boat types
