= Beneteau Evasion 29 =

Sailboat class

Development
- Designer: André Bénéteau
- Location: France
- Year: 1980
- No. built: about 100
- Builder: Beneteau
- Role: Motorsailer
- Name: Beneteau Evasion 29

Boat
- Displacement: 8,818 lb (4,000 kg)
- Draft: 4.76 ft (1.45 m)

Hull
- Type: monohull
- Construction: glassfibre
- LOA: 28.87 ft (8.80 m)
- LWL: 25.20 ft (7.68 m)
- Beam: 10.17 ft (3.10 m)
- Engine: Volvo 30 or 50 hp (22 or 37 kW) diesel engine

Hull appendages
- Keel: Fin keel
- Ballast: 3,527 lb (1,600 kg)
- Rudder: Skeg-mounted rudder

Rig
- Rig type: Bermuda rig

Sails
- Sailplan: Masthead sloop
- Mainsail area: 175 sq ft (16.3 m^{2})
- Jib/genoa area: 215 sq ft (20.0 m^{2})
- Spinnaker area: 657 sq ft (61.0 m^{2})
- Other sails: genoa: 315 sq ft (29.3 m^{2}) storm jib: 71 sq ft (6.6 m^{2})
- Upwind sail area: 490 sq ft (46 m^{2})
- Downwind sail area: 832 sq ft (77.3 m^{2})

The Beneteau Evasion 29 is a French sailboat that was designed by André Bénéteau as a motorsailer and first built in 1980.

== Production ==
The design was built by Beneteau in France, from 1980 until 1984, with about 100 boats completed.

== Design ==
The Evasion 29 is a recreational keelboat, built predominantly of glassfibre, with wood trim. The hull is solid fibreglass and the deck is balsa-cored. It has a masthead sloop rig, with a deck-stepped mast, one set of unswept spreaders and aluminium spars with continuous stainless steel wire standing rigging. The hull has a raked stem, a slightly angled transom, a skeg-mounted rudder controlled by a wheel on the wheelhouse and tiller in the cockpit. The design was built with the option of a fixed fin keel or twin bilge keels. The fin keel model displaces 8,818 lb (4,000 kg) and carries 3,527 lb (1,600 kg) of cast iron ballast, while the twin keel version displaces 9,039 lb (4,100 kg) and carries 3,704 lb (1,680 kg) of cast iron ballast.

The boat has a draft of 4.76 ft (1.45 m) with the standard keel and 3.58 ft (1.09 m) with the optional dual keels.

The boat is fitted with a Swedish Volvo diesel engine of 30 or 50 hp (22 or 37 kW) for docking and manoeuvring. The fuel tank holds 40 U.S. gallons (150 L; 33 imp gal) and the fresh water tank has a capacity of 53 U.S. gallons (200 L; 44 imp gal).

The design has sleeping accommodation for six people, with a double "V"-berth berth in the bow cabin, a drop-down dinette table that forms a double in the main salon and an aft cabin with a double berth on the port side. The galley is located on the starboard side at the companionway ladder. The galley is of straight configuration and is equipped with a two-burner stove, an ice box and a double sink. A navigation and steering station is forward of the galley, on the starboard side. The head is located just aft of the bow cabin on the port side and includes a shower. Cabin headroom is 72 in (183 cm).

For sailing downwind the design may be equipped with a symmetrical spinnaker of 657 sq ft (61.0 m^{2}).

The design has a hull speed of 6.73 kn (12.46 km/h).

== See also ==
- List of sailing boat types
