= Lancer 28T Mark V =

Sailboat class

Development
- Designer: W. Shad Turner
- Location: United States
- Year: 1982
- Builder: Lancer Yachts
- Role: Cruiser

Boat
- Displacement: 5,200 lb (2,359 kg)
- Draft: 3.00 ft (0.91 m)

Hull
- Type: monohull
- Construction: fiberglass
- LOA: 27.67 ft (8.43 m)
- LWL: 23.92 ft (7.29 m)
- Beam: 8.00 ft (2.44 m)
- Engine: Yanmar 7.6 hp (6 kW) diesel engine

Hull appendages
- Keel: fin keel
- Ballast: 2,600 lb (1,179 kg)
- Rudder: internally-mounted spade-type rudder

Rig
- Rig type: Bermuda rig
- I foretriangle height: 28.50 ft (8.69 m)
- J foretriangle base: 10.50 ft (3.20 m)
- P mainsail luff: 29.00 ft (8.84 m)
- E mainsail foot: 11.00 ft (3.35 m)

Sails
- Sailplan: fractional rigged sloop
- Mainsail area: 159.50 sq ft (14.818 m^{2})
- Jib/genoa area: 149.63 sq ft (13.901 m^{2})
- Total sail area: 309.13 sq ft (28.719 m^{2})

The Lancer 28T Mark V, or Mark 5, is an American trailerable sailboat that was designed by W. Shad Turner as a cruiser and first built in 1982.

== Production ==
The design was built by Lancer Yachts in the United States, starting in 1982, but it is now out of production.

== Design ==
The Lancer 28T Mark V is a recreational keelboat, built predominantly of fiberglass, with wood trim. It has a fractional sloop rig, a raked stem, a slightly angled transom, an internally mounted spade-type/ rudder controlled by a wheel or a tiller and a fixed fin keel. It displaces 5,200 lb (2,359 kg) and carries 2,600 lb (1,179 kg) of ballast.

The boat has a draft of 3.00 ft (0.91 m) with the standard keel. The keel is wide and has a dropped cabin floor into it to increase headroom to 6.17 ft (188 cm).

The boat is normally fitted with a small outboard motor, but can be optionally equipped with a Japanese Yanmar inboard diesel engine of 7.5 hp (6 kW) for docking and maneuvering.

The design has sleeping accommodation for four people, with a straight settee in the main cabin, a drop-down dinette table and an aft cabin with two single berths. The galley is located on both sides just forward of the companionway ladder. The galley is equipped with a two-burner stove to port and a sink to starboard. The head is located just aft of the bow storage area and includes a sink. The fresh water tank has a capacity of 15 U.S. gallons (57 L; 12 imp gal).

The design has a hull speed of 6.55 kn (12.13 km/h).

== See also ==
- List of sailing boat types
