= Lancer 28 =

Sailboat class

Development
- Designer: W. Shad Turner
- Location: United States
- Year: 1977
- Builder: Lancer Yachts
- Role: Day sailer-cruiser
- Name: Lancer 28

Boat
- Displacement: 4,900 lb (2,223 kg)
- Draft: 2.83 ft (0.86 m)

Hull
- Type: monohull
- Construction: fiberglass
- LOA: 27.67 ft (8.43 m)
- LWL: 23.92 ft (7.29 m)
- Beam: 8.00 ft (2.44 m)
- Engine: Inboard motor or outboard motor of 10 hp (7 kW)

Hull appendages
- Keel: fin keel
- Ballast: 2,200 lb (998 kg)
- Rudder: internally-mounted spade-type rudder

Rig
- Rig type: Bermuda rig
- I foretriangle height: 32.00 ft (9.75 m)
- J foretriangle base: 11.75 ft (3.58 m)
- P mainsail luff: 27.00 ft (8.23 m)
- E mainsail foot: 9.25 ft (2.82 m)

Sails
- Sailplan: masthead sloop
- Mainsail area: 124.88 sq ft (11.602 m^{2})
- Jib/genoa area: 188.00 sq ft (17.466 m^{2})
- Total sail area: 312.88 sq ft (29.068 m^{2})

Racing
- PHRF: 258

The Lancer 28 is an American sailboat that was designed by W. Shad Turner as a trailerable daysailer and cruiser, which was first built in 1977.

== Production ==
The design was built by Lancer Yachts in the United States from 1977 until 1985, but it is now out of production.

== Design ==
The Lancer 28 is a recreational keelboat, built predominantly of fiberglass, with wood trim. It has a masthead sloop rig or optional fractional rig, with a taller mast stepped further forward. The hull has a raked stem, an angled transom, an internally mounted spade-type rudder controlled by a tiller and a wide, hollow, fixed fin keel. It displaces 4,900 lb (2,223 kg) and carries 2,200 lb (998 kg) of ballast.

The boat has a draft of 2.83 ft (0.86 m) with the standard shallow-draft keel.

The boat could be fitted with an inboard motor or a small, well-mounted outboard motor for docking and maneuvering. Inboard factory power options included an American Outboard Marine Corporation saildrive, a Japanese Yanmar, French Renault or British Petters Limited diesel engine or a gasoline engine of 10 hp (7 kW).

The design has sleeping accommodation for six people, with a double "V"-berth in the bow cabin, a straight settee in the main cabin, a drop-table, wide single berth and two aft cabins under the cockpit with single berths each. The galley is located on both sides of the cabin, just forward of the companionway ladder. The galley is equipped with a two-burner stove to port and a sink and icebox to starboard. The enclosed head is located just aft of the bow cabin on both sides. The maximum cabin headroom is 74 in (188 cm), as the cabin sole drops into the hollow keel.

For sailing the design may be equipped with a jib or one of a series of genoas.

The design has a PHRF racing average handicap of 258 for the masthead sloop version and 248 for the fractional rig.

== Operational history ==
In a 2000 review Darrell Nicholson wrote, "in a lot of ways, the Lancer 28 is a good study in the compromises that are inherent in creating a relatively big boat that can be lugged around from place to place on a trailer. Sailing performance is one of those compromises. Small boats get stability either from wide beam or deep, heavy keels. The Lancer 28 has neither ... the Lancer 28 is tippy. Most owners in our survey consider the boat about average in stability, but in our experience, an "average" rating usually means a fairly tender boat ... You don't buy this boat for speed. It's a noncompetitive daysailer and weekend trailer cruiser. ... If you need a trailerable boat that can accommodate two adults and several children for relatively short-term cruising, the Lancer 28 makes sense. But don't expect to get six berths, "full headroom," shoal draft, and trailerability in a 28' boat without some fairly substantial compromises."

== See also ==
- List of sailing boat types
