= Lancer 36 =

Sailboat class

Development
- Designer: Bill Lee
- Location: United States
- Year: 1973
- Builder: Lancer Yachts

Boat
- Displacement: 10,500 lb (4,763 kg)
- Draft: 6.00 ft (1.83 m)

Hull
- Type: monohull
- Construction: fiberglass
- LOA: 36.17 ft (11.02 m)
- LWL: 29.00 ft (8.84 m)
- Beam: 11.75 ft (3.58 m)
- Engine: Yanmar 27 hp (20 kW) diesel engine

Hull appendages
- Keel: fin keel
- Ballast: 4,000 lb (1,814 kg)
- Rudder: internally-mounted spade-type rudder

Rig
- Rig type: Bermuda rig
- I foretriangle height: 42.00 ft (12.80 m)
- J foretriangle base: 16.00 ft (4.88 m)
- P mainsail luff: 37.00 ft (11.28 m)
- E mainsail foot: 12.00 ft (3.66 m)

Sails
- Sailplan: masthead sloop
- Mainsail area: 222.00 sq ft (20.624 m^{2})
- Jib/genoa area: 336.00 sq ft (31.215 m^{2})
- Total sail area: 558.00 sq ft (51.840 m^{2})

The Lancer 36 is an American sailboat that was designed by Bill Lee as a racer-cruiser and first built in 1973.

In 1982 the boat was reintroduced with a fractional rig as the Lancer 36 FR.

== Production ==
The prototype boat, Chutzpah was built the year before Lancer Yachts was formed and was the impetus for starting the company.

== Design ==
The Lancer 36 is a recreational keelboat, built predominantly of fiberglass, with wood trim. It has a masthead sloop rig, a raked stem, a reverse transom, an internally mounted spade-type rudder controlled by a wheel and a fixed fin keel. It displaces 10,500 lb (4,763 kg) and carries 4,000 lb (1,814 kg) of ballast.

The boat has a draft of 6.00 ft (1.83 m) with the standard keel and 4.92 ft (1.50 m) with the optional shoal draft keel.

The boat is fitted with a Japanese Yanmar diesel engine of 27 hp (20 kW) for docking and maneuvering. The fuel tank holds 30 U.S. gallons (110 L; 25 imp gal) and the fresh water tank has a capacity of 50 U.S. gallons (190 L; 42 imp gal).

The design had a number of interior arrangements available. The cruising interior includes sleeping accommodation for six people, with a double "V"-berth around a drop-leaf table in the bow cabin and two aft cabins, each with a double berth. The galley is located on the starboard side just forward of the companionway ladder. The galley is L-shaped and is equipped with a two-burner stove and a double sink. A navigation station is opposite the galley, on the port side. The head is located opposite the galley on the port side and includes a shower.

For sailing downwind the design may be equipped with a symmetrical or asymmetrical spinnaker.

== Operational history ==
The prototype boat, Chutzpah, won the Transpacific Yacht Race in both 1973 and 1975.

== See also ==
- List of sailing boat types
