= Lancer 29 Mark III =

1970s American recreational keelboat

Development
- Designer: C&C Design
- Location: United States
- Year: 1977
- Builder: Lancer Yachts
- Role: Cruiser
- Name: Lancer 29 Mark III

Boat
- Displacement: 7,800 lb (3,538 kg)
- Draft: 5.17 ft (1.58 m)

Hull
- Type: monohull
- Construction: fiberglass
- LOA: 28.67 ft (8.74 m)
- LWL: 23.50 ft (7.16 m)
- Beam: 10.00 ft (3.05 m)
- Engine: Yanmar 8 to 15 hp (6 to 11 kW) diesel engine/outboard motor

Hull appendages
- Keel: fin keel
- Ballast: 3,000 lb (1,361 kg)
- Rudder: skeg-mounted rudder

Rig
- Rig type: Bermuda rig
- I foretriangle height: 35.00 ft (10.67 m)
- J foretriangle base: 12.83 ft (3.91 m)
- P mainsail luff: 30.00 ft (9.14 m)
- E mainsail foot: 10.00 ft (3.05 m)

Sails
- Sailplan: masthead sloop
- Mainsail area: 150.00 sq ft (13.935 m^{2})
- Jib/genoa area: 224.53 sq ft (20.860 m^{2})
- Total sail area: 374.53 sq ft (34.795 m^{2})

The Lancer 29 Mark III is a recreational keelboat built by Lancer Yachts in the United States from 1977 until 1981. Also called the Lancer 29-3, in 1982 it was renamed the Lancer 30.

The fiberglass hull has a raked stem, a plumb transom, and a skeg-mounted rudder. The boat has a draft of 5.17 ft (1.58 m) with the standard keel and 4.17 ft (1.27 m) with the optional shoal draft keel. It has a hull speed of 6.49 kn (12.02 km/h).

The boat may be optionally fitted with a Japanese Yanmar diesel engine of 8 hp (6 kW), 12 hp (9 kW) or 15 hp (11 kW), or a 15 hp (11 kW) gasoline engine. It could also be equipped with a well-mounted outboard motor.

Cabin headroom is 72 in (183 cm). The fresh water tank has a capacity of 24 U.S. gallons (91 L; 20 imp gal).

It is a masthead sloop rig.
