= Lancer 30 Mark IV =

Sailboat class

Development
- Designer: C&C Design
- Location: United States
- Year: 1978
- Builder: Lancer Yachts
- Role: Cruiser

Boat
- Displacement: 8,200 lb (3,719 kg)
- Draft: 5.18 ft (1.58 m)

Hull
- Type: monohull
- Construction: fiberglass
- LOA: 29.20 ft (8.90 m)
- LWL: 24.00 ft (7.32 m)
- Beam: 10.00 ft (3.05 m)
- Engine: inboard motor

Hull appendages
- Keel: fin keel
- Ballast: 3,000 lb (1,361 kg)
- Rudder: internally-mounted spade-type rudder

Rig
- Rig type: Bermuda rig
- I foretriangle height: 35.00 ft (10.67 m)
- J foretriangle base: 12.83 ft (3.91 m)
- P mainsail luff: 29.00 ft (8.84 m)
- E mainsail foot: 10.00 ft (3.05 m)

Sails
- Sailplan: masthead sloop
- Mainsail area: 145.00 sq ft (13.471 m^{2})
- Jib/genoa area: 224.53 sq ft (20.860 m^{2})
- Total sail area: 369.53 sq ft (34.330 m^{2})

The Lancer 30 Mark IV also called the Lancer 30-4, is an American sailboat that was designed by C&C Design as a cruiser and first built in 1978.

The Lancer 30 Mark IV is a development of the C&C 30, using the molds from that design.

== Production ==
The design was built by Lancer Yachts in the United States from 1978 until 1985, but it is now out of production.

== Design ==
The Lancer 30 Mark IV is a recreational keelboat, built predominantly of fiberglass, with wood trim. It has a masthead sloop rig, a raked stem, a raised counter reverse transom, an internally mounted spade-type rudder and a fixed fin keel. It displaces 8,200 lb (3,719 kg) and carries 3,000 lb (1,361 kg) of ballast.

The boat has a draft of 5.18 ft (1.58 m) with the standard keel and 4.18 ft (1.27 m) with the optional shoal draft keel.

The boat is fitted with an inboard engine for docking and maneuvering.

The design has sleeping accommodation for four people, with a double "V"-berth in the bow cabin and an aft cabin with a double berth on the port side. The galley is located on the starboard side just forward of the companionway ladder. The galley is an open L-shaped and is equipped with a two-burner stove and a double sink. A navigation station is opposite the galley, on the port side. The head is located at the companionway on the starboard side.

The design has a hull speed of 6.57 kn (12.17 km/h).

== See also ==
- List of sailing boat types
