= Évadé =

French and Belgian nationals who tried to escape from Allied territories during WWII

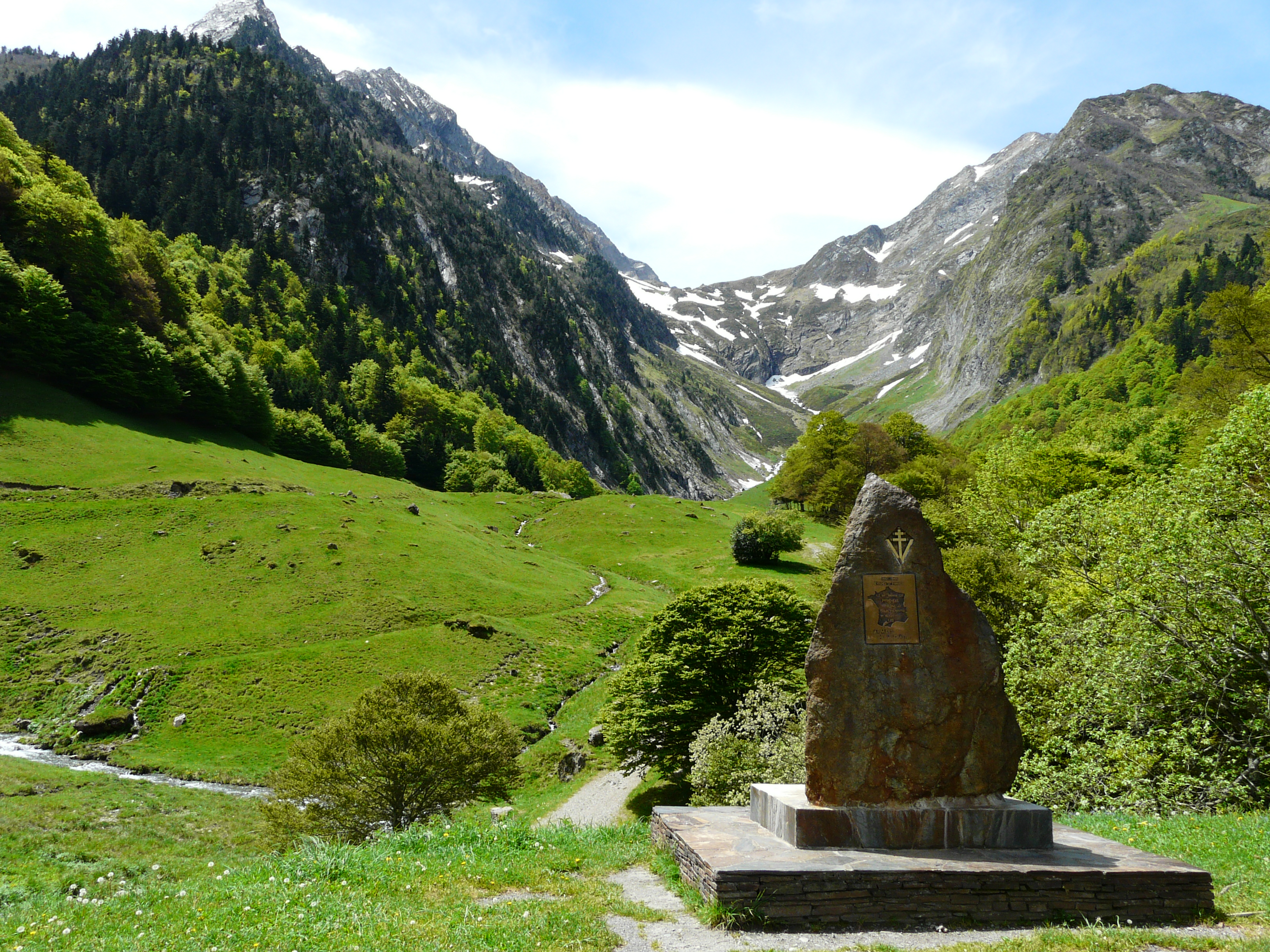
Monument commemorating a common crossing point for évadés de France at Hospice de France in the Pyrenees, south of the French town of Bagnères-de-Luchon

Évadés (French; lit. 'escapees' or 'the escaped', sometimes Dutch: ontsnapten), often referred to in France as the évadés de France (lit. 'escapees of France') to distinguish them from escaped prisoners of war, were French and Belgian nationals who attempted to escape from German-occupied Europe to reach the United Kingdom or other Allied territories in World War II. Many attempted to cross the French border into Spain with the help of paid intermediaries (passeurs) or local sympathisers in an attempt to reach Portugal or Gibraltar Colony where it was possible to arrange transport to the United Kingdom with Allied help. A smaller number instead travelled to Sweden or Switzerland, and a small number of French évadés instead sought to travel through the Soviet Union.

Many were detained by local police as they crossed illegally through the zone libre in Vichy France and were sometimes forced to enlist with Vichy's Foreign Legion in French North Africa or the work camps run by the Chantiers de la Jeunesse. Once across the Pyrenees, others were detained by the Spanish police and held in prisons or the Miranda concentration camp. Dutch nationals making similar journeys were often referred to as Engelandvaarders. On arrival in the United Kingdom, the évadés were held at the Patriotic School in London where they were interrogated to discover any Axis spies hidden among them. Subsequently many joined the armies in exile in the United Kingdom or other Allied services.

== See also ==
- Engelandvaarder
- Shetland bus
- Sikorski's tourists
- Spain and World War II
