= C&C 30 =

70s-80s Canadian recreational keelboat

C&C 30-1
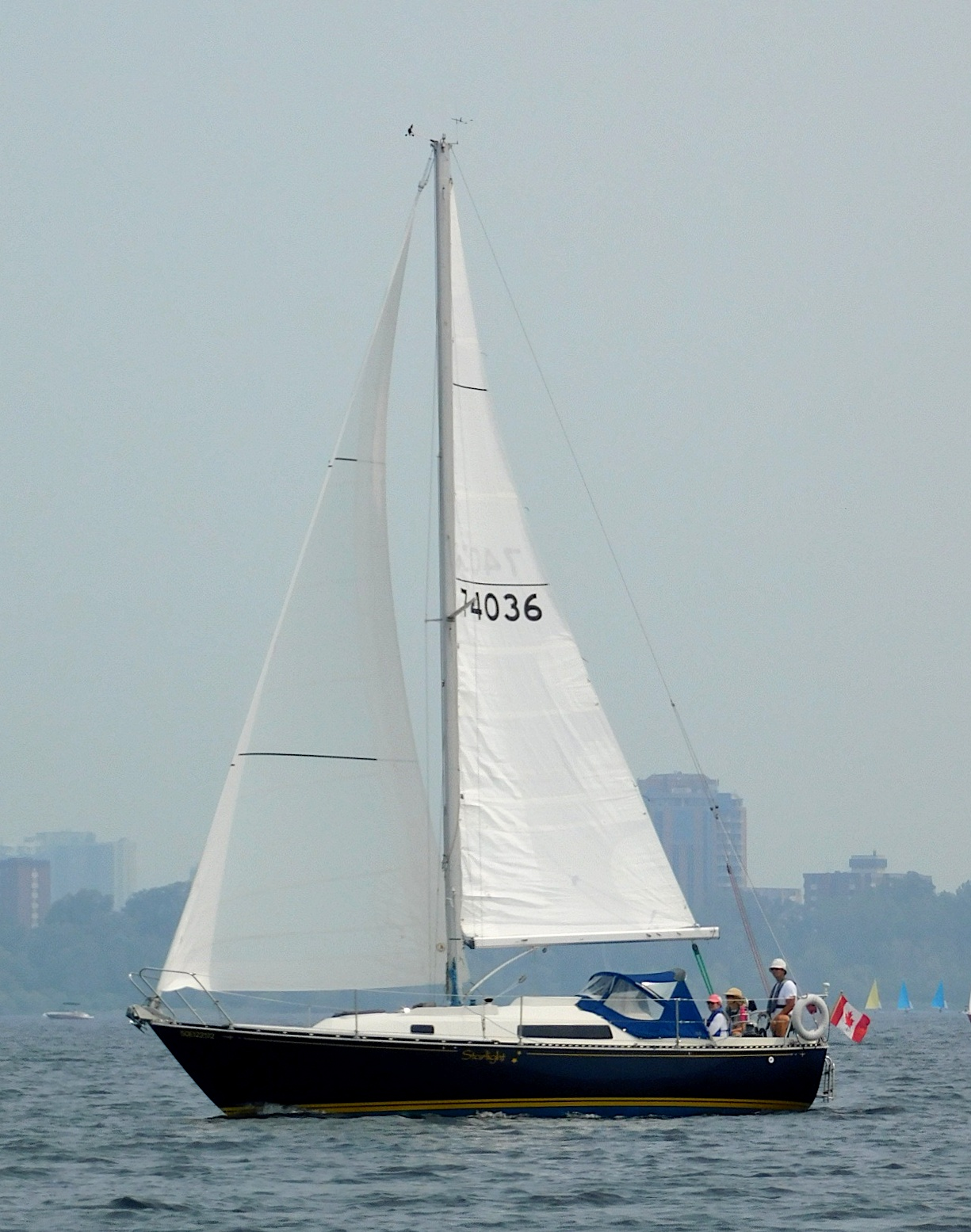
- C&C 30-1

Development
- Designer: Cuthbertson & Cassian
- Location: Canada
- Year: 1973
- No. built: 800 (Mark 1s)
- Builder: C&C Yachts
- Name: C&C 30-1

Boat
- Displacement: 8,000 lb (3,629 kg)
- Draft: 5.0 ft (1.5 m)

Hull
- Type: Monohull
- Construction: Fibreglass
- LOA: 30.0 ft (9.1 m)
- LWL: 24.92 ft (7.60 m)
- Beam: 10.00 ft (3.05 m)
- Engine: Universal Atomic 4 gasoline engine

Hull appendages
- Keel: fin keel
- Ballast: 3,450 lb (1,565 kg)
- Rudder: internally-mounted spade-type rudder

Rig
- General: Masthead sloop
- I foretriangle height: 39.00 ft (11.89 m)
- J foretriangle base: 13.50 ft (4.11 m)
- P mainsail luff: 34.00 ft (10.36 m)
- E mainsail foot: 11.50 ft (3.51 m)

Sails
- Mainsail area: 195.50 sq ft (18.163 m^{2})
- Jib/genoa area: 263.25 sq ft (24.457 m^{2})
- Total sail area: 458.75 sq ft (42.619 m^{2})

The C&C 30 is a classic Canadian recreational keelboat. More than 1000 were built from 1973 to 1985. by C&C Yachts of Niagara on the Lake, Ontario, in Canada. There have been four completely different C&C 30 designs. The C&C 30 One Design, was built by USWatercraft, LLC.

== Variants ==
C&C 30-1 (Mark 1)
Designed by Cuthbertson & Cassian, as a development of the C&C 27. Introduced in 1973, over 800 were built. It has a draft of 5.00 ft (1.52 m) with the standard keel and 4.2 ft (1.3 m) with the optional shoal draft keel. The boat was initially fitted with a Universal Atomic 4 gasoline engine. This was replaced with the Yanmar QM15 diesel engine and later a 2GM. It has a hull speed of 6.69 kn (12.39 km/h). Later boats built had a large number of small changes to the design, including new windows and rudder mounts

C&C 30-2 (Mark 2)
Designed by Robert W. Ball and introduced in 1988. It has a length overall of 29.92 ft (9.1 m), a waterline length of 25.75 ft (7.8 m), displaces 8,275 lb (3,753 kg) (8,500 lb (3,856 kg) with the winged keel), carries 3,100 lb (1,406 kg) of lead ballast and has a masthead sloop rig. The boat has a draft of 5.83 ft (1.78 m) with the standard keel and 4.50 ft (1.37 m) with the optional wing keel. The boat is fitted with a Yanmar 2GM. The fuel tank holds 33 U.S. gallons (120 L; 27 imp gal) and the fresh water tank has a capacity of 53 U.S. gallons (200 L; 44 imp gal). The boat has a PHRF racing average handicap of 144 with a high of 144 and low of 147. It has a hull speed of 6.8 kn (12.59 km/h).

C&C 30 One Design
This model was introduced as a one design racer, designed by Mark Mills and was in production in 2017. The hull is made from Vinylester, E-glass with foam core, resin-infused carbon reinforced structure and features a retractable bowsprit. It has a length overall of 30.01 ft (9.1 m), a waterline length of 28.70 ft (8.7 m), displaces 3,995 lb (1,812 kg) and carries 1,579 lb (716 kg) of ballast. The boat has a carbon fibre lead bulb daggerboard and is fitted with a Volvo saildrive diesel engine of 12 hp (9 kW). The fuel tank holds 6.5 U.S. gallons (25 L; 5.4 imp gal). It has carbon fibre spars, a fractional rig and 640.6 sq ft (59.51 m^{2}) of sail for upwind sailing and 1,643.2 sq ft (152.66 m^{2}) for downwind sailing.

== Gallery ==
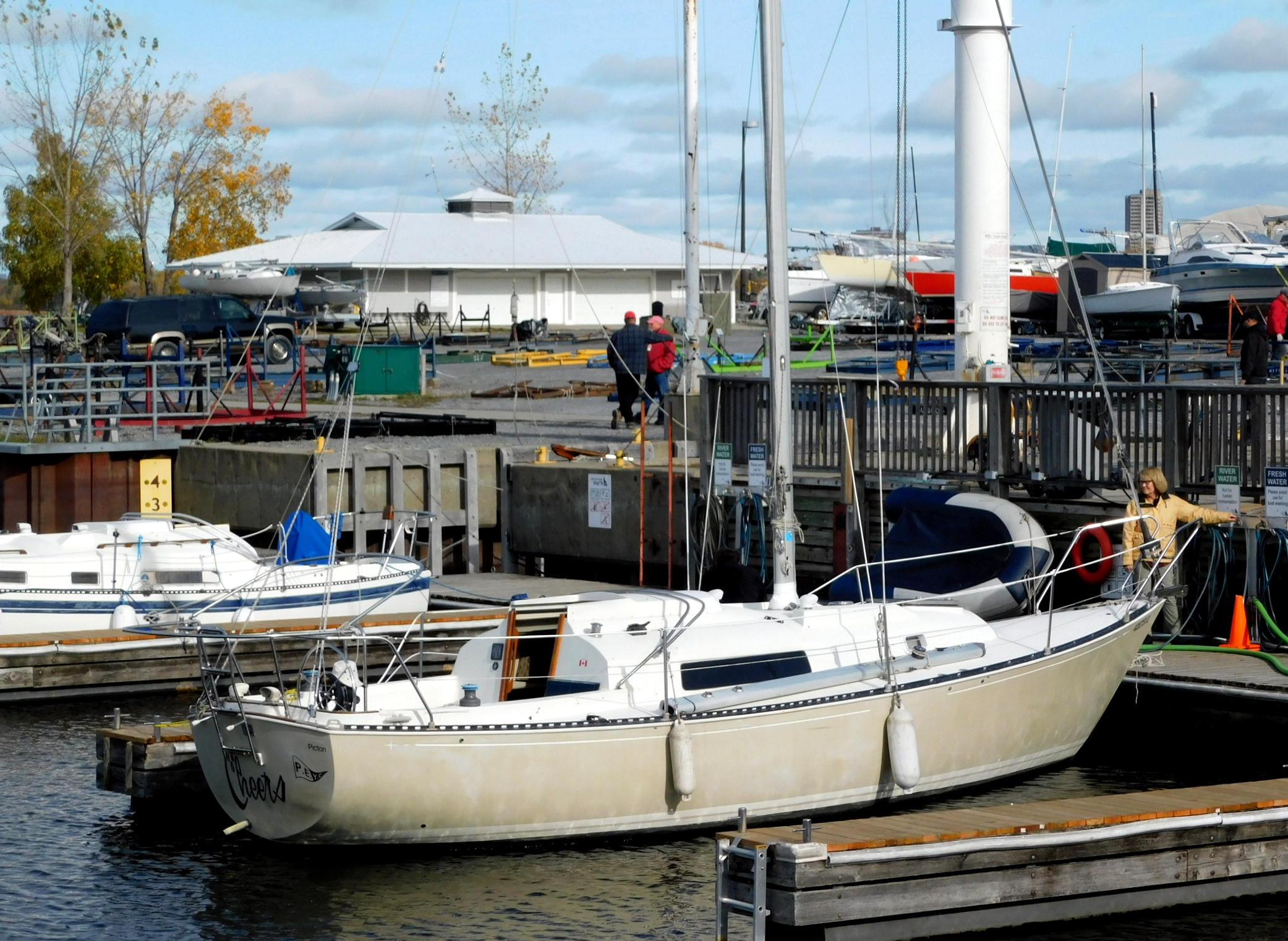
C&C 30 Mark I

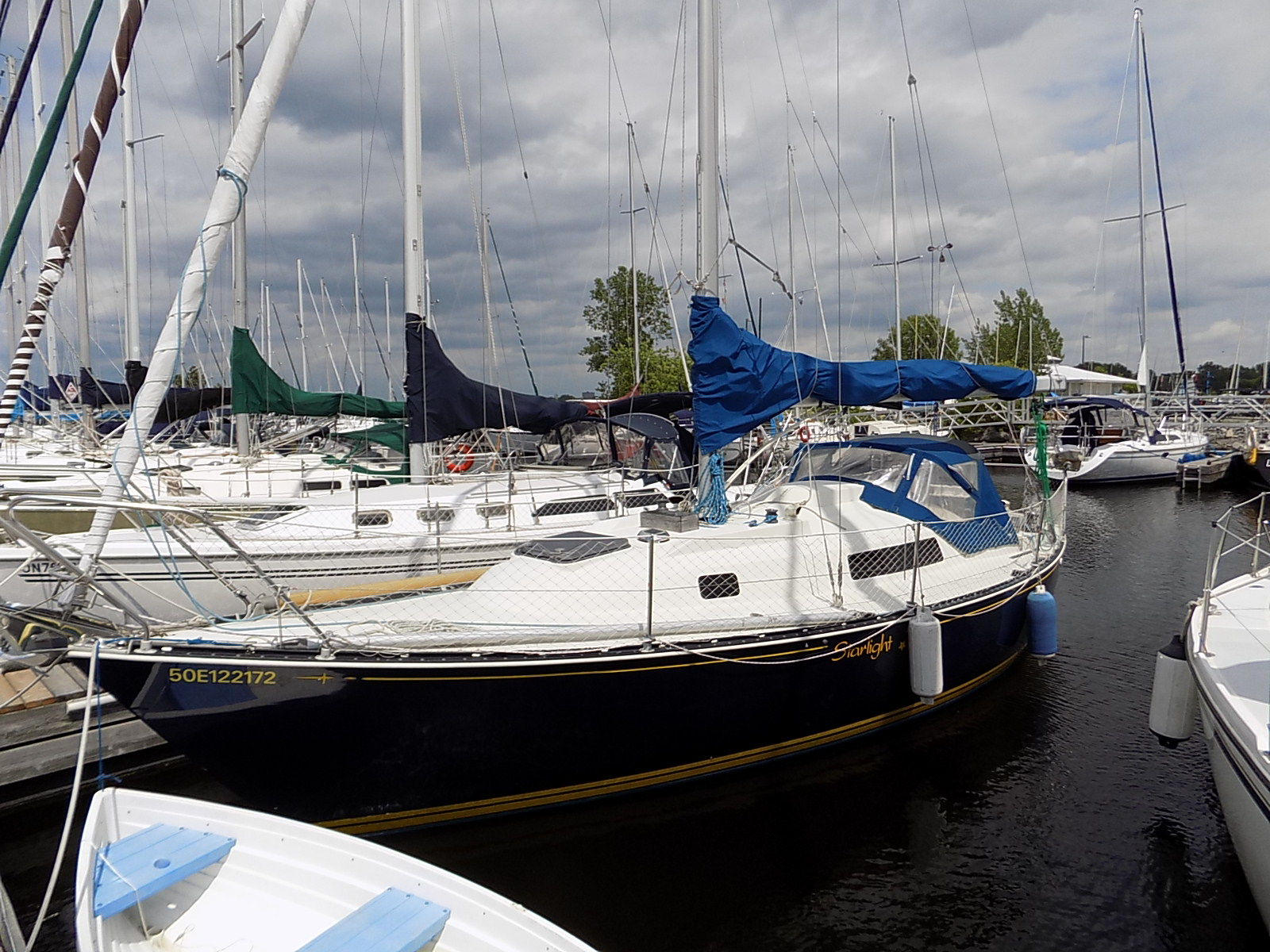
C&C 30 Mark I

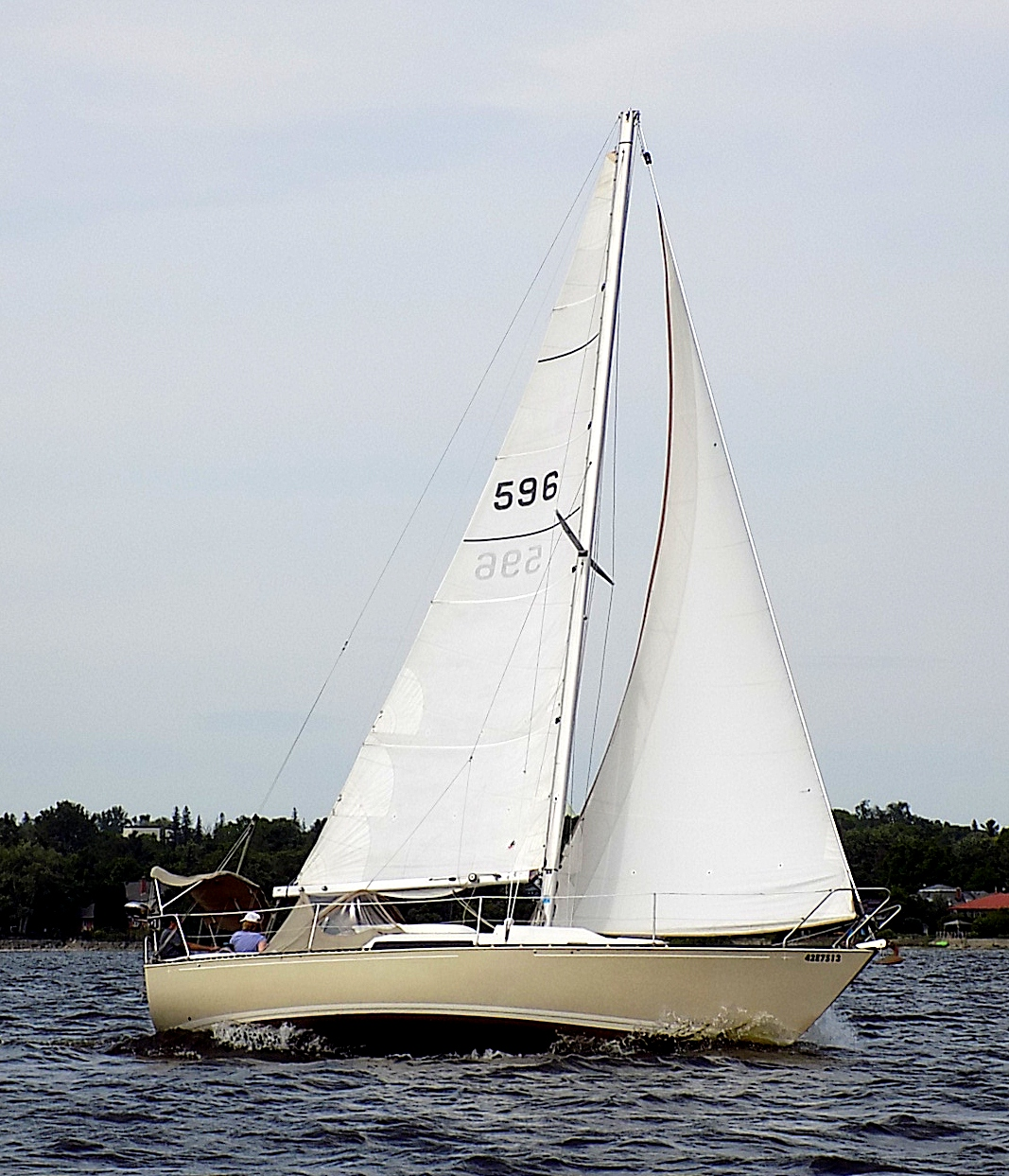
C&C 30 Mark I

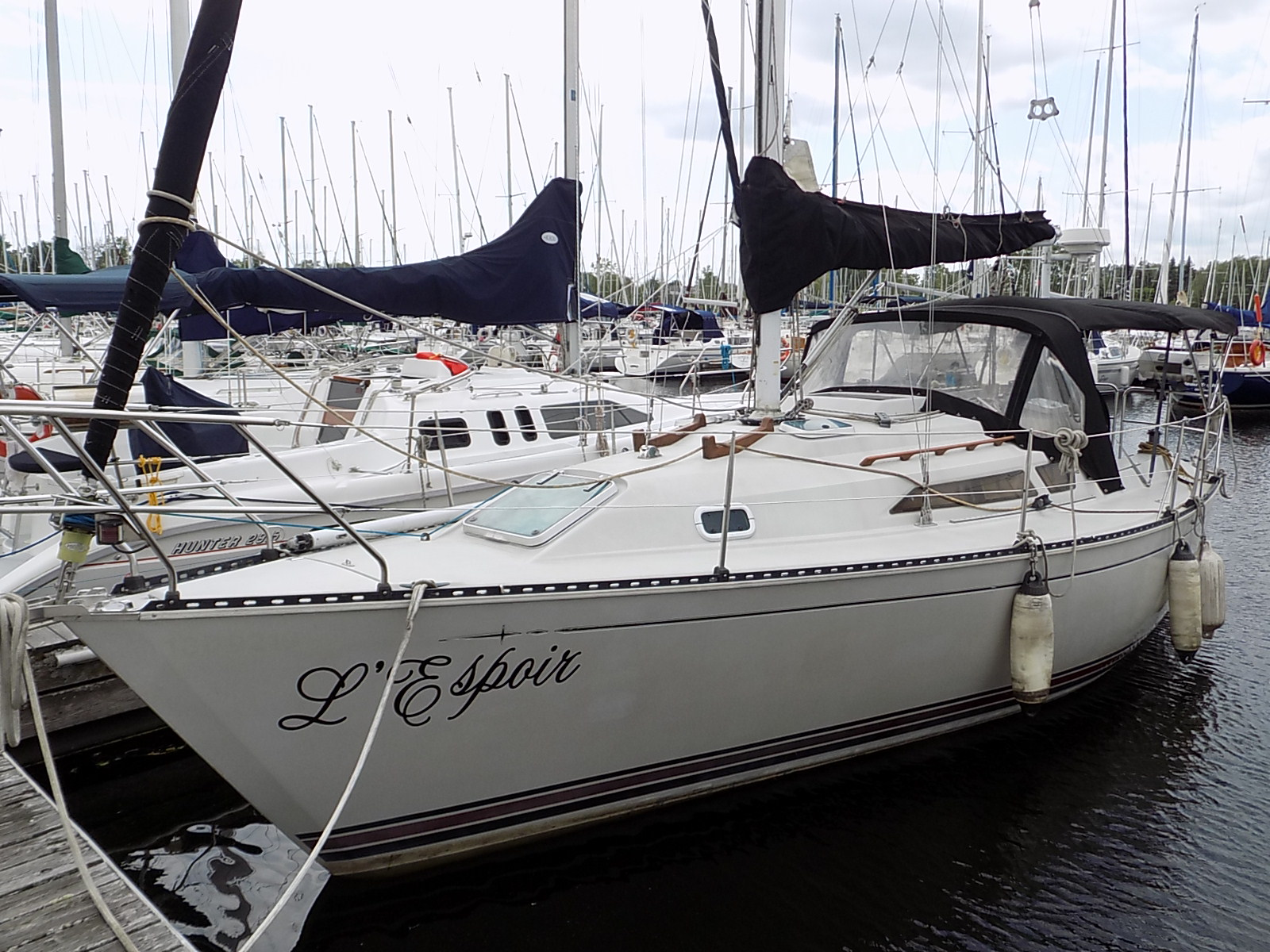
C&C 30-2 (Mark 2)
