= Motorsailer =

Type of motor-powered sailing vessel

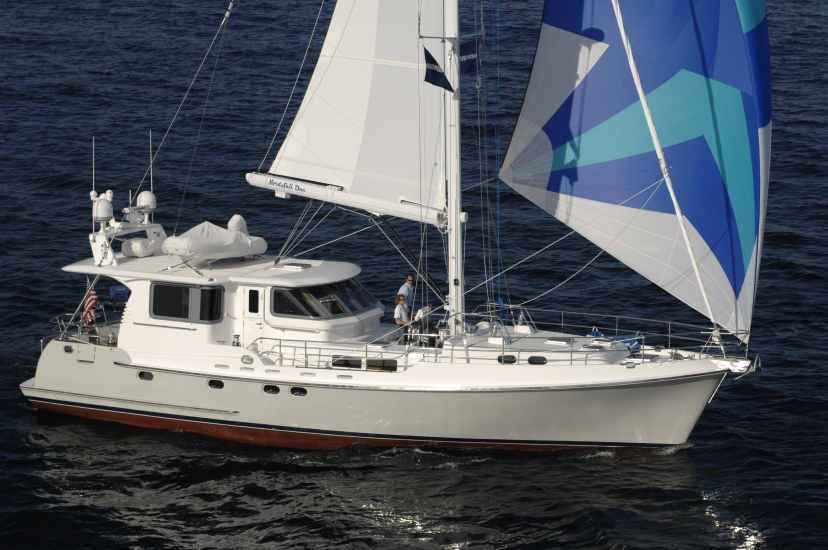
A 56-foot (17 m) motorsailer

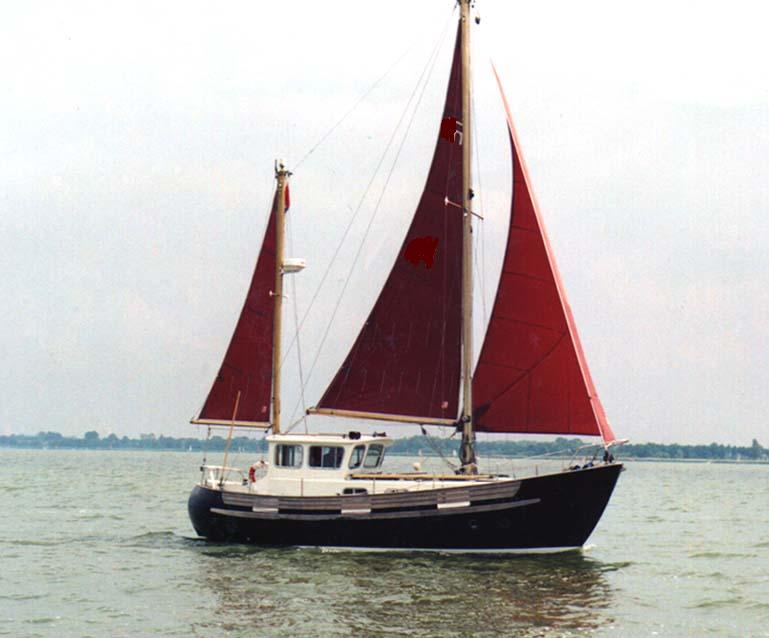
A ketch-rigged motorsailer

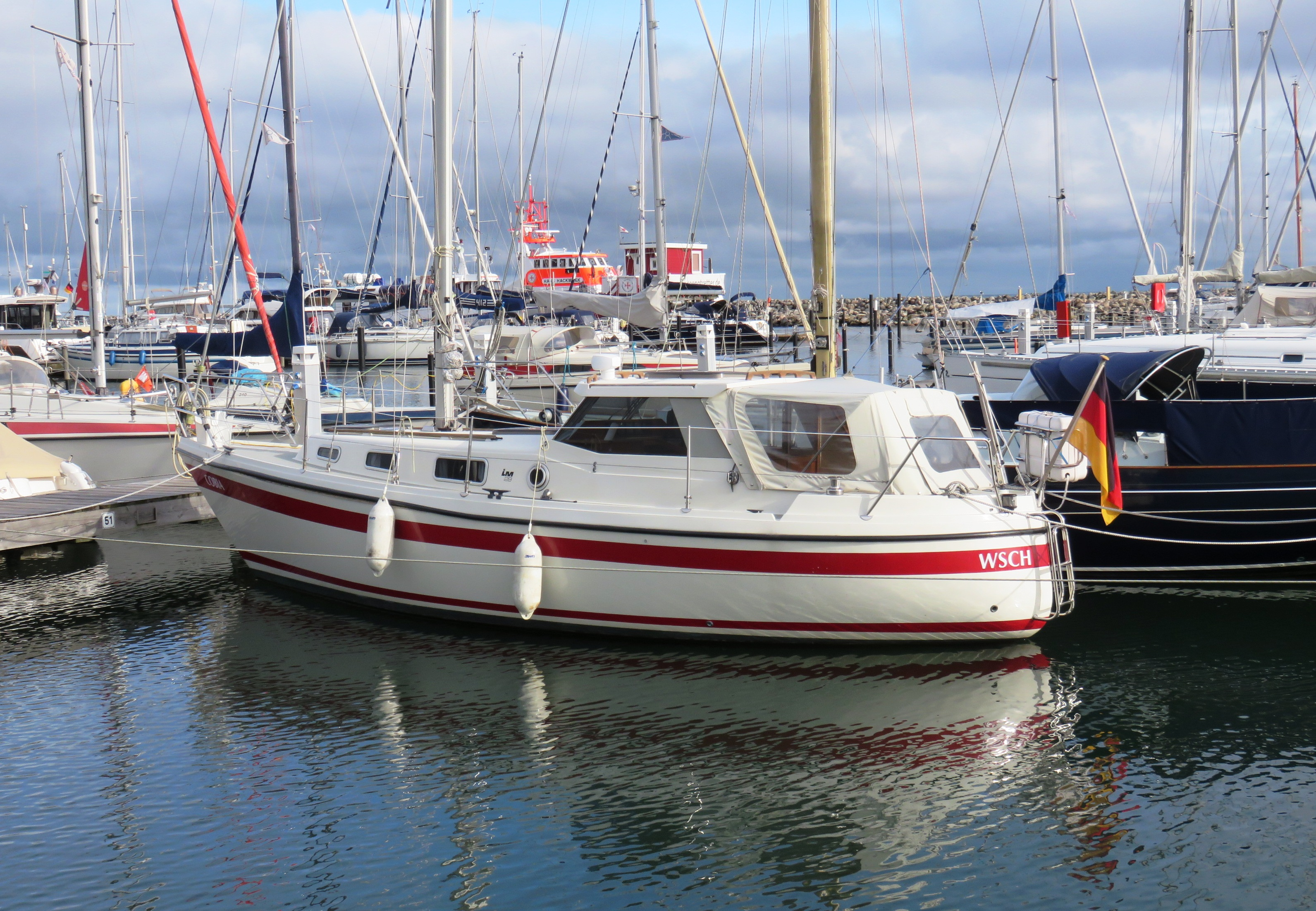
A canoe-sterned motorsailer

A motorsailer is a type of motor-powered sailing vessel, typically a yacht, that can derive power from its sails or engine, independently from each other during moderate seas or winds. A motorsailer may have a sail-to-engine power ratio in the range 30/70 to 70/30 (percent sail power/percent engine power).

== Characteristics ==
Most motorsailers are yachts, with motors that can drive them at near hull speed in moderate seas, and sails that can provide power in moderate breezes without needing to use the engine. They normally have a sheltered steering station, which is likely to be a pilot house. The emphasis of such craft is typically comfort at sea and the ability to cruise long distances. The comparative capabilities of the engine and sails are often described as a ratio of sail-to-engine capabilities:

- 30/70 has a relatively small sail plan and a large engine;
- 50/50 derives equal power capability from sails and engine for a seaworthy, passage-making yacht;
- 70/30 has an underbody and distribution of ballast that allows a powerful rig under sail, despite the tankage for water and fuel that such a vessel carries for passage-making.

Motorsailers generally have variable-pitch propellers, necessary to mitigate the drag that derives from their large diameter needed to transmit power to the water.

While a sailing yacht will often be rigged as a Bermuda rigged-sloop or cutter (both types having a single mast), the motorsailer will more likely have a multi-masted split-rig sail-plan, such as a ketch, yawl or schooner, to provide ease of sail handling and better balance of forces in heavy weather.

Motorsailers offer the following advantages over conventional auxiliary sailboats:

- Interior space
- Comfort and amenities
- Reliable passage-making
- Ease of short-handed sailing

== See also ==
- Motorboat
- Sailing yacht
