= Bust and harp tokens =

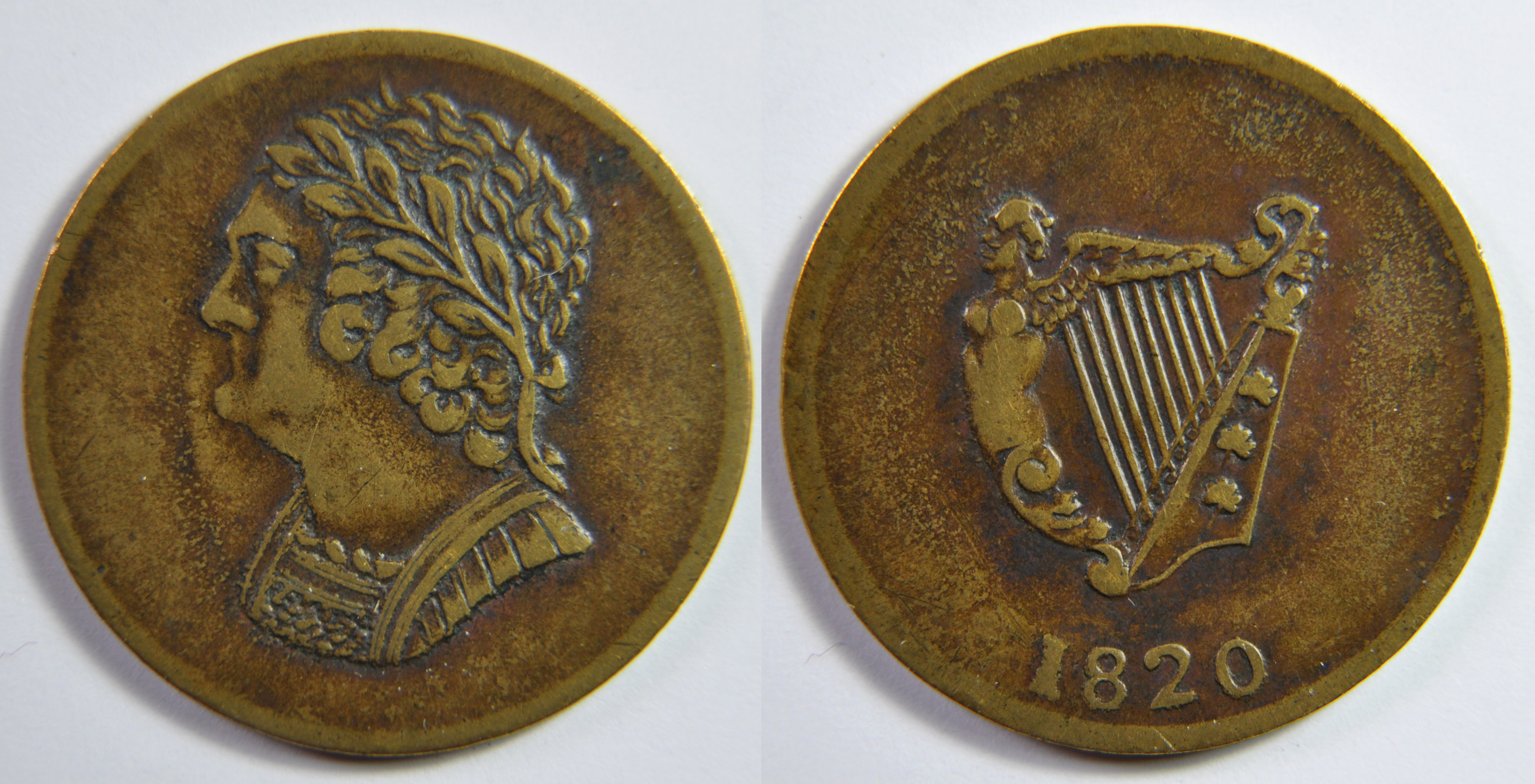
An illustration of a "Bust and Harp" token (Breton 1012), depicting a crude bust of George III on the obverse, and an Irish Harp on the reverse

The Bust and Harp tokens were tokens originally issued anonymously in the mid-1820s, and circulated primarily in Lower Canada (present-day Quebec). Due to their anonymous nature, it is not known who placed the order for the original tokens, but they are believed to have been minted in England beginning in 1825. The initial release of the tokens was dated 1825, but a currency regulation issued that same year made the importation of privately issued tokens illegal. As a result, the initial issue was altered and all subsequent issues of these tokens were antedated to 1820 in order to get around this prohibition, which did not prohibit tokens made before this date. They were circulated in large quantities and were widely imitated by minters located in Canada, making for many varieties. Those of particularly poor craftsmanship are considered examples of Blacksmith tokens. They were roughly the size of a contemporaneous half-penny, though generally weighed less. They were widely circulated in Lower Canada for at least 30 years, after which banks began to refuse them as payment except by weight. The more common Bust and Harp tokens can be had for about a few tens of C$, though rarer varieties can command prices in the thousands of dollars.

== Description ==
The obverse depicts a crude bust of George III wearing a cuirass. In the majority of these tokens the bust faces left, though in a single rare variety it faces right.

The reverse features a harp with a frame incorporating a female winged figure facing left. The date 1820 appears below the harp, with 1825 appearing on one rare variety which is generally accepted as the date when they were originally issued.

These tokens were struck primarily in copper and brass, weigh between 4.2 and 6.8 g, and vary between 28.3 and 28 mm in diameter. One rare variety was made of a lead-bronze alloy, weighing 5.2 g and is 27.6 mm in diameter.

There are 26 major varieties of this token recognized by modern collectors, distinguished primarily by the alloy used, particular features of the bust on the obverse, and the number of strings in the harp on the reverse.

== Numismatic study ==
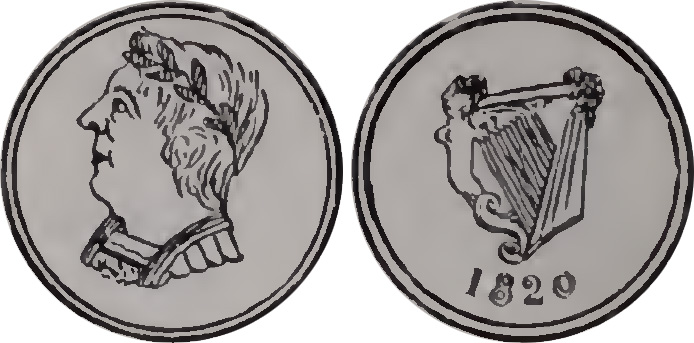
An illustration of the Bust and Harp token from Pierre Napolean Breton's 1894 catalog of Canadian coins and tokens

Canadian numismatist Pierre-Napoléon Breton noted "about twenty-five varieties, mostly common" in the 1894 edition of his book Illustrated History of Coins and Tokens Relating to Canada He also notes that the ones dated 1825 as very rare, and considered their design as a whole to be "inferior in workmanship". The token (and all of its varieties) is given the number 1012 in his Breton numbering system.

Canadian numismatist R. W. McLachlan delivered a paper to the American Numismatic Society called The Real Date of the Canadian 1820 Harp Tokens, published in the January 1907 edition of the Society's Proceedings. McLachlan first discusses the likely origin of the tokens, followed by a description of 24 major varieties. McLachlan theorizes that a crisis in the lack of circulating currency in Canada reached a peak in the mid-1820s, and with local government found "wanting in its duty" to relieve the situation by issuing official coinage, local entrepreneurs found a way to introduce tokens that skirted existing counterfeiting regulations. The design they settled upon was designed to imitate the old copper coins of George III that still circulated, with the harp design imitating an Irish halfpenny. McLachlan believes that this design was executed by an unknown Birmingham coiner, who used the original issue date of 1825. This date posed a problem, as local regulations prohibited new tokens on or after that date, so the die was changed and subsequent tokens issued bearing the date 1820. As a result, the tokens bearing the original date of 1825 are rare, and command a premium. There are also examples where the 5 is still visible over an overcut 0, and McLachlan considered both the 1825 and the ones with the overcut 0 to be among the first to be issued, and superior in many ways to the subsequent locally made imitations that followed. This first group of Bust and Harp tokens were minted in copper.

McLachlan conjectures that within a couple of years after the original Bust and Harp tokens started to circulate is when local imitations began to appear. This first imitation of an imitation was coined in brass, and McLachlan comments that while the portrait of the king is not as well-executed as the original, he considered it good enough that it was likely made by another Birmingham-based engraver, though this has not been subsequently verified. This obverse was then mixed with six different reverses, whose dies were also refurbished over time. McLachlan believes that this second series of Bust and Harp tokens were created between 1826 and 1827, or perhaps later. He also considered a reverse design with "a still more rude head" to be a subsequent issue also likely created in England, and minted between 1828 and 1829. This was then followed by a series of cruder, likely Canadian-made designed and minted varieties. McLachlan believed that four of the major Bust and Harp varieties were struck in England, and 20 in Canada, making for a series of 24 varieties consisting of 11 different obverses and 17 reverses, all struck in a 10-year period between 1825 and 1835.

Another detailed study of the series and its variants came from Canadian numismatist Eugene Courteau with his article The Canadian 1820 Bust and Harp Tokens - Breton's No. 1012 published in The Numismatist in May 1907. Courteau categorized 26 separate varieties, dividing the tokens into three main types based on whether they have eight, nine, or 10 harp strings. He also noted the rarity of the variety with the 1825 date and warned collectors to beware of unscrupulous dealers who had altered the dates of more common 1820 tokens, emphasizing that the genuinely rare 1825 variety was only struck in copper.

== Bibliography ==
- Breton, P. N. (1894). Illustrated History of Coins and Tokens Relating to Canada. P.N. Breton & Co.
- Chapados-Girard, C. (2020). Canadian Colonial Tokens, 10th Edition. The Charlton Press.
- Courteau, Eugene (May–June 1907). "The Canadian 1820 Bust and Harp Tokens - Breton's No. 1012". The Numismatist. 20 (5–6): 138–142.
- Ingram, Gregory S; Marelic, Branko (2003). The Bust and Harp Tokens of Canada. self-published. ISBN 0-9735186-0-X.
- Grawey, Tim (October 4, 2016). "Bust and Harp varieties tough yet fun to identify". Canadian Coin News. 54 (13): 25 and 38.
- Grawey, Tim (December 24, 2019). "Die cracks, forked '2' distinguish 'Bust and Harp' variety". Canadian Coin News. 57 (19): 12.
- McLachlan, R. W. (1907). "The Real Date of the Canadian 1820 Harp Tokens". Proceedings and Papers of the American Numismatic Society. 49 (1): 51–55.
- Willey, Robert C. (2011). The Annotated Colonial Coinages of Canada. PetchNet.
- Kleeberg, John M. (1907). "The Numismatist". American Numismatic Society. JSTOR 43607140.
- Cross, W. K. (2012). Canadian Colonial Tokens, 8th Edition. The Charlton Press.
- Chapados-Girard, C. (2020). Canadian Colonial Tokens, 10th Edition. The Charlton Press.
- Heritage World and Ancient Coins: The Doug Robins Collection of Canadian Tokens. Chicago: Heritage Numismatic Auctions, Inc. April 20, 2018.
- Kingsford, William (1874). A Canadian Political Coin. Ottawa: E. A. Perry.
- Kleeberg, John M. (Ed.) (2000). Circulating Counterfeits of the Americas. American Numismatic Society.
- Lorenzo, John (2017). Forgotten Coins of the North American Colonies - 25th Anniversary edition. Amazon Books.
- Mayhugh, Marc (Summer 2008). "The Vexator". The C4 Newsletter. 16 (2): 36–39.
- McLachlan, R. W. (April 1915). "When Was the Vexator Canadensis Issued?". The Canadian Antiquarian and Numismatic Journal.
- Sandham, Alfred (1869). Coins, Tokens and Medal of the Dominion of Canada. Montreal: Daniel Rose.
- Willey, Robert C. (2011). The Annotated Colonial Coinages of Canada. PetchNet.
- Willey, R. C. (April 1969). "The History of Canadian Numismatics". The Canadian Numismatic Journal. 14 (4): 115.
