= Joseph Leroux =

Canadian numismatist

Joseph LeRoux M.D. (9 April 1849 – 1904) was an early Canadian numismatist, who published several significant works on pre-Canadian Confederation coins, tokens and medals in the 1880s. Along with other early Canadian numismatists like Alfred Sandham, R. W. McLachlan, and P. N. Breton, he helped lay the foundations of Canadian numismatic research.

LeRoux published the following books on Canadian numismatics:

- Numismatic Atlas for Canada, (Fr. Atlas numismatique du Canada), published in 1883
- Vade mecum du collectionneur, published in 1885
- The Canadian Coin Cabinet, (Fr. Le médaillier du Canada) published in 1888, with a subsequent publication in 1890

== Bibliography ==
- Hudgeons, Marc; Hudgeons Jr., Thomas E. (2007). The Official Blackbook Price Guide to World Coins 2008. Random House Information Group. ISBN 9780375721694.
- Willey, R. C. (April 1969). "The History of Canadian Numismatics". The Canadian Numismatic Journal. 14 (4): 115.
