= Blacksmith token =

1800s Canadian counterfeit-like currency

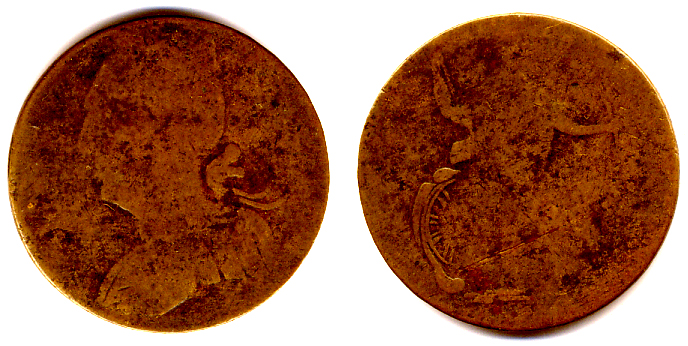
Obverse and reverse image of a typical Blacksmith Token (Wood-13/BL-9), depicting a crude profile of a British monarch on one side and a seated Britannia with a shield holding a spear. Contrast enhanced to bring out detail.

Blacksmith tokens are a form of evasion currency that was in circulation primarily in Lower Canada and Upper Canada along with neighboring areas, such as the northern parts of New York and New England in the mid-1820 to 1830s. They were not, strictly speaking counterfeits, but instead skirted around the laws of the time by being similar to officially circulating coinage, but bearing different legends, or bearing no legends or dates at all, so it could not be claimed that they were truly imitating circulating coinage fully. The tokens were designed to resemble worn examples of English or Irish copper coinage, most often with a crude profile of either George II or George III in profile on the obverse and an image of Britannia or an Irish harp on the reverse. They were typically underweight when compared to officially sanctioned halfpenny coinage, but were accepted along with many other unofficially issued tokens due to a lack of sufficient small denomination coinage in circulation at the time.

Most examples were issued in copper, with a few examples struck in brass. Due to the deliberately poor nature of the images carved into the dies for these tokens, it is rare for a Blacksmith token to be graded higher than Very Fine, with most examples falling into a Good or Very Good grade. While first mentioned by noted Canadian numismatists Eugene Courteau and R.W. McLachlan, Blacksmith tokens were first fully described as a separate type of evasion currency by American numismatist Howland Wood with the publication of his pamphlet The Canadian Blacksmith Coppers in 1910. These coins, along with many other underweight copper tokens, were eventually driven out of circulation by the late 1830s as Canadian banks began to issue officially sanctioned copper tokens of the proper weight for their value.

It is not known how many of these coins were made, as the creators faced prosecution if they were discovered. Evidence from hoards suggest that some of the blacksmith tokens were relatively common, and examples of various Blacksmith coppers have been found during archaeological excavations along with other coinage contemporary to the 1830s in the Saint John River Valley in Nova Scotia, on the grounds of Fort York in Toronto, and Place Royale in Quebec City.

The more common Blacksmith tokens can be had for about C$20-$30, while the rarer varieties for which only a handful or unique examples are known can command prices in the thousands of dollars.

== Name origin ==
The name is derived from a reference by R.W. McLachlan in an 1885 article about Canadian Numismatics, where he describes a specific coin of this series and says:

Previous to 1837, when the lack of specie caused copper change to be accepted in bulk, there lived in Montreal a blacksmith of dissipated habits. He prepared a die for himself, and when he wished to have a "good time" he struck two or three dollars in these coppers, and thereby supplied himself with sufficient change with which to gratify his wishes.

While this description was intended to describe only a specific coin in the series, "blacksmith token" or "blacksmith copper" was the name that stuck, and was soon applied to all of these types of coins. While the rarer blacksmith tokens may well have been struck by a single person by hand, the large numbers of some of the more common tokens in this series suggests that some of them came from more professional minting operations. McLachlan stated that the numerous types of blacksmith tokens available and their quantity meant that they were either struck at several different establishments in quantity, or a large number came from one establishment which operated for several years. More recent research points to the blacksmith tokens being created at various locations in Lower Canada, and possibly in Upper Canada and the United States.

== Numismatic study ==
Individual coins in the Blacksmith token series were described by the Canadian numismatist R.W. McLachlan in articles dating back to the mid-1880s, and several examples were also included in Pierre-Napoléon Breton's extensive catalog of Canadian colonial tokens. Numismatist Eugene Courteau was the first to notice design similarities between several of these coins, and documented them in an article published in The Numismatist in 1908.

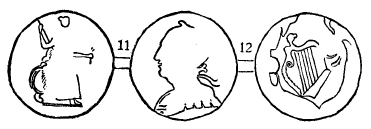
Wood's illustration for the Blacksmith tokens Wood 11 and Wood 12, the former depicting a crude Britannia figure combined with a profile of George III, and the latter the regal profile combined with an Irish harp.

Howland Wood published the first comprehensive study of the series in an article published The Numismatist in 1910, titled The Canadian Blacksmith Coppers (published later that same year as a pamphlet of the same name). He noted one characteristic that was common to the series, that they were created specifically to look like worn British half-pence coins. Another common feature to most of the Blacksmith coppers was that their designs were the opposite to that of the original coin being imitated. If the coin was imitating the bust of George III on its obverse, it would face left in the Blacksmith version whereas in the officially issued coinage it would face right. Wood believed that the reason for this was the inexperience of the die cutter, who created the die facing the same way as the original coin being imitated. The reverse of many of these coins featured an image of Britannia who faced the opposite way from the original, though Wood notes that when the reverse featured a harp, it faced the same way as it did on the Irish regal coinage it was imitating. Most of these regal imitations were created using copper, though he notes a few that were done in brass. Though Wood had no conclusive proof, he thought the regal imitation Blacksmith tokens were created in the first quarter of the 19th century, noting a particular specimen that had been struck over a George IV half-penny of 1825, so clearly not struck before that date, and was likely struck sometime soon after that date. This has been further corroborated in more recent times with the discovery of a Blacksmith token that had been struck over an Upper Canadian token dating to 1820.

In addition to the Blacksmith tokens that imitated English and Irish regal coinage of George II and George III, Wood also pointed out a second series of Blacksmith tokens which he considered to be "curiosities and puzzles", consisting of mules that mixed up dies from various store card tokens with other crudely made dies. One of these mules includes dies made for a store card token that was released within the United States in 1835, meaning that the Blacksmith version could not have been issued prior to this date. Given that the banks of Upper and Lower Canada started issuing their own officially sanctioned tokens of the correct weight for their value in 1838, Wood believed this series of tokens must have been created between those dates. Wood also pointed out the relative scarcity of these Blacksmith tokens when compared to those imitating regal coinage, believing that they were issued in limited numbers.

Wood counted 46 distinct varieties of Blacksmith tokens. Subsequent research has shown that two of Wood's Blacksmith tokens are in fact worn imitation coppers of British origin, and a third token listed by Wood a copper variant made of brass is in fact made of copper. A study by Oppenheim cataloging the auction of a prominent Blacksmith token collection added several more Blacksmith tokens and variants that were unknown to Wood; the Charlton catalog of Canadian Colonial Tokens lists 56 Blacksmith tokens and varieties. Blacksmith tokens are recognized as falling into specific categories based on the design they were imitating: those containing a regal profile, imitations of the Tiffin plus "Bust and Harp" tokens, those with blank reverse, imitations of the "Ships Colonies and Commerce Tokens", the "BITIT" Series, those based on worn Daniel and Benjamin True token dies, and other miscellaneous types.

Research continues in this area, the most recent contribution being by John Lorenzo who has done extensive X-ray fluorescence studies of various Blacksmith tokens to determine their metal composition. Some of his discoveries include finding that the die axes described for some varieties in existing coin catalogs should be considered approximate, identifying additional sub-varieties to Wood 29 and Wood 38, and suggesting that there are at least four major "families" of Blacksmiths whose production are linked based on the dies that were used.

=== 'BITIT' Tokens ===
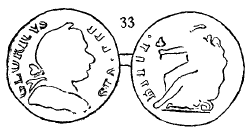
Wood's illustration of Wood 33, with indistinct legends for the tops of the letters along the circumference of the obverse and reverse.

The "BITIT" blacksmith tokens (Wood 33) are considered to be the most common of the Blacksmiths series, and one of the most controversial in numismatic literature. The obverse contains the profile of George III with what Wood described as a "large pug nose", while the reverse has a seated Britannia holding a shamrock. Unlike most Blacksmith tokens, this coin features a legend on both sides, with the tops of the letters obscured by excessive die polishing, possibly done on purpose.

There has been considerable interpretation as to the reading of the legend of the token, as the missing top portion of its letters supports different readings. McLachlan interpreted the inscription on the obverse as saying "GLORIUVS III VIS", though some numismatists contemporary to McLachlan suggested that the "VIS" should instead be read as "VTS", which is claimed to be an abbreviated, Latin version for "Vermont". McLachlan refuted this claim, saying that he had "little doubt that this piece was struck and issued in Canada as an imitation of a George III copper". This argument has been picked up again in more recent numismatic studies, with one article affirming that an example graded as Fine reveals the "I" should be read as "T", supporting the "VTS" reading. An off-center strike of this Blacksmith token in the collection of the Bank of Canada Museum where the top portion of the supposed "T" ought to be more visible, but is not, contradicts this reading.

Wood thought that the obverse legend read "GLORIOVS III VIS". A more recent article claims that several high-grade examples of the coin reveal a weak serif and cross-bar on the "L", and that the first "O" is thinner than the second, suggesting that the initial word of the legend should be read as "GEORIUVS" instead. The legend on the obverse has been interpreted as reading as the nonsensical "BITIT", though one study claims that the "I" and "T" are instead an "R" and "I", making the word read "BRITI" instead, a short form for "BRITISH".

In his comprehensive listing of Blacksmith tokens, Wood included this in his "Miscellaneous and Doubtful" series, suggesting that it might be an imitation regal coin created in England, but sharing the common Blacksmith token characteristic of the regal bust facing the opposite way. While McLachlan clearly thought that this coin was issued in Canada and was relatively plentiful, it is notable that it was not included in Breton's Illustrated History of Coins and Tokens Relating to Canada, possibly because he thought it was a British import. While American numismatist John H. Hickcox believed the coin to have come from Vermont, the majority consensus of other mid-19th century U.S. Colonial numismatists omit the coin in their listings While the provenance of this coin is still debated, examples of this coin appearing in the hoard McLachlan described and archaeological finds in locations in Upper Canada, Lower Canada and New Brunswick establish that it circulated in Canada.

== Bibliography ==
- Biancarosa, Jim (August 2014). "This Orphan Needs a Home: GEORIUVS. III . VTS / BRITI". The Colonial Newsletter. 54 (2): 4191–4198.
- "Canada, unknown, 1/2 penny : 1838". Bank of Canada Museum: National Currency Collection.
- Cross, W. K. (2012). Canadian Colonial Tokens, 8th Edition. The Charlton Press.
- Evans, Bret (March 7, 2017). "Strong interest, bidding at recent Hoare Auction". Canadian Coin News. 54 (24): 1, 21.
- Faulkner, Christopher (2017). Coins are Like Songs: The Upper Canada Coppers 1815–1841. Spink.
- Hoover, Oliver (August 2008). "Wood 33: An Evasive Copper in North America". The Colonial Newsletter. 48 (2): 3279–3288.
- Grawey, Tim (January 13, 2015). "Colonial Tokens: American weighs in on Blacksmith token". Canadian Coin News. 52 (20): 16, 28.
- Grawey, Tim (July 26, 2016). "Colonial Tokens: Hoards shed light on George II counterfeits". Canadian Coin News. 54 (8): 18.
- Kleeberg, John M. (2009). "Numismatic Finds of the Americas an Inventory of American Coin Hoards, Shipwrecks, Single Finds, and Finds in Excavations". Numismatic Notes and Monographs (169). American Numismatic Society. JSTOR 43607140.
- Leonard, Robert (December 2014). ""This Orphan Needs a Home: GEORGIUCS.III.VTS / BRITI": A Rejoinder". The Colonial Newsletter. 54 (1): 4221–4229.
- Lorenzo, John (2017). Forgotten Coins of the North American Colonies - 25th Anniversary edition. Amazon Books.
- McLachlan, R. W. (April 1885). "Canadian Numismatics [Concluded]". American Journal of Numismatics. 19 (4): 82–85.
- Oppenheim, Michael (March 26–27, 1987). "Warren Baker Collection of Canadian Blacksmith Coppers". The Frederick B. Taylor Collection and Other Properties. 1 (1): 100–116.
- Willey, R.C. (July–August 1981). "The Colonial Coinages of Canada: Part XIX, The 'Blacksmith' Tokens of Lower Canada". Canadian Numismatic Journal. 26 (7): 306–312.
- Wood, Howland (1910). The Canadian Blacksmith Coppers. The Numismatist.
