= Emil Voigt =

Emil Voigt may refer to:

- Emil Voigt (athlete) (1883–1973), British athlete, winner of the Olympic 5 miles race in 1908
- Emil Voigt (gymnast) (1879–1946), American gymnast who competed at the 1904 Summer Olympics
- Emil Voigt (numismatist) (1909–1998), American numismatist and collector
