= William Alexander Weir =

Canadian politician

Member of the Legislative Assembly of Quebec for Argenteuil
- In office 1897–1910
- Preceded by: William John Simpson
- Succeeded by: John Hay

Speaker of the Legislative Assembly of Quebec
- In office April 25, 1905 – August 31, 1906
- Preceded by: Auguste Tessier
- Succeeded by: Philippe-Honoré Roy

Personal details
- Born: October 15, 1858 Montreal, Canada East
- Died: October 22, 1929 (aged 71) London, England
- Education: McGill University

William Alexander Weir (October 15, 1858 – October 22, 1929) was a Quebec lawyer, politician, and judge. He was the MLA for Argenteuil in the Legislative Assembly of Quebec from 1897 to 1910, held several ministries, and helped rewrite several provincial Codes.

== Biography ==
=== Early life ===
Weir was born in Montreal on October 15, 1858, the son of William Park Weir and Helen Craig Smith, who had emigrated from Scotland to Canada in 1852. William Park Weir became Surveyor of Customs in the Port of Montreal. His brother, Robert Stanley Weir, would become famous as a judge and author of the English verses for O Canada. His sister, the temperance activist, Elizabeth Weir McLachlan, was married to Robert Wallace McLachlan.

Weir was educated at the High School of Montreal and McGill University, earning a B.C.L. degree in 1881, and was called to the Bar of Quebec on July 12, 1881.

He married Adelaide Sayers Stewart, daughter of William C. Stewart of Hamilton, Ontario, in October 1885.

=== Early career ===
During the time he practised law, Weir also wrote for The Montreal Star from 1880–1881 and the Argenteuil County News from 1895–1897.

Weir published several special editions of Quebec Civil Codes and he served as Secretary of the Royal Commission to revise the Code of Civil Procedure in 1897.

=== Political career ===
Weir's first attempt at election to the Legislative Assembly of Quebec in 1890 failed. In 1897, he ran again and succeeded in winning the riding of Argenteuil, representing the Liberal Party of Quebec.

He was appointed minister without portfolio in 1903 under Premier Simon-Napoléon Parent. On February 3, 1905, Weir, Lomer Gouin, and Adélard Turgeon joined forces and resigned from Cabinet in a push to force Parent out of the leadership. Gouin then became premier on March 21, 1905, and Weir served as minister without portfolio (1905), Speaker (1905–1906), minister of public works and labour (1906–1907), and provincial treasurer (1907–1910).

=== Judge ===
Upon appointment as a judge for the Quebec Superior Court on January 11, 1910, Weir resigned his seat. He presided over the Workman libel trial in May 1911.

He finished his career becoming a Montreal District Court judge in 1923.

=== Death ===
Weir died on October 22, 1929, in London, England.

== Published works ==
- Municipal Code of the Province of Quebec (1889)
- Civil Code of the Province of Quebec (1890)
- Codes of the Province of Quebec (1890)
- An Insolvency Manual (1890)
- The Educational Act of the Province of Quebec (1899)
- Code of Civil Procedure (1900)

== See also ==
- Robert Stanley Weir
- Simon-Napoléon Parent
- Argenteuil (provincial electoral district)
