= Elizabeth Weir McLachlan =

Elizabeth Weir McLachlan (1846 - June 11, 1936) was a Scottish-born Canadian temperance reformer. For eighteen years, she was recording secretary of the Dominion Woman's Christian Temperance Union (WCTU). She also served as editor of the White Ribbon leaflet, the monthly official organ of the Quebec Provincial Union.

== Early life and education ==
Elizabeth Weir was born at Stane, Cambusnethan, North Lanarkshire, Scotland, in 1846. The parents were from Stair, East Ayrshire, Scotland. Her father was William Park Weir. Her siblings included brothers William Alexander Weir, Robert Stanley Weir, and Thomas Weir, as well as sisters, Mrs. J. S. Sorley and Mrs. Archibald Wright.

Migrating with her family from Scotland to Canada, she was educated in the public schools of Montreal.

== Career ==
For many years, McLaclilan was active in Sunday-school, church, missionary, and temperance work. She was president of the Hochelaga County, Quebec WCTU for five years, and of the McLachlan WCTU for a similar period before becoming honorary president. In 1883, she was appointed secretary of the first Montreal WCTU. Later, she served as recording secretary, treasurer, and corresponding secretary of the Provincial WCTU of Quebec. For eighteen years, she was recording secretary of the Dominion WCTU.

McLachlan was editor of the White Ribbon leaflet, the monthly official organ of the Quebec Provincial Union. She was a life member of the World's WCTU, of the Quebec Provincial WCTU, and Hochelaga County WCTU. She was a member of the Canada Congregational Woman's Board of Missions, and a member of the Dominion Alliance Executive. She served as secretary of the W.M.A. for 42 years before becoming president of the Auxiliary for 10 years.

== Personal life ==
She married Robert Wallace McLachlan of that city on October 19, 1876. They had a daughter, Inez.

She resided in Montreal, where she died on June 11, 1936.
