= Robert Stanley Weir =

Canadian judge & poet (1856-1926)

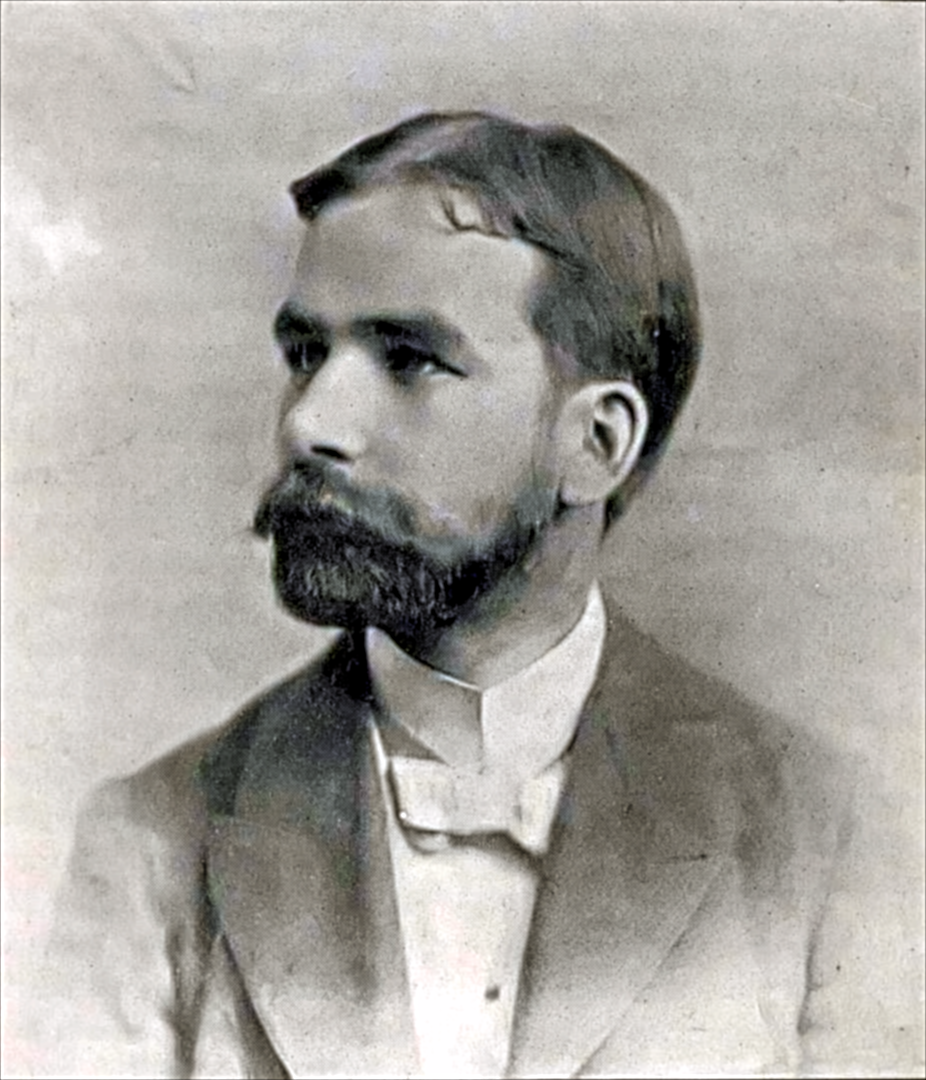
- Robert Stanley Weir c. 1899
- Born: November 15, 1856; Hamilton, Province of Canada
- Died: August 20, 1926 (aged 69); Lac Memphrémagog, Quebec, Canada
- Occupations: judge and poet
- Known for: wrote the lyrics of the original English version of the Canadian national anthem "O Canada"
- Spouse: Margaret Alexander Douglas (m. 1882)
- Children: 6

Robert Stanley Weir FRSC (November 15, 1856 – August 20, 1926) was a Canadian judge and poet most famous for writing the English lyrics to "O Canada", the national anthem of Canada. He was educated as a teacher and lawyer and considered one of the leading experts of the day on Quebec's municipal civil law. He was appointed a municipal court judge and a local judge in admiralty for the Exchequer Court of Canada.

Weir published several individual poems in magazines and collections in books. His lyrics for the English version of "O Canada" eclipsed many others' lyrical attempts and songs to quickly become the most popular patriotic song in Canada for the past century.

== Early history ==
Weir was born in Hamilton, Canada West, the son of William Park Weir and Helen Craig Smith, who had emigrated from Scotland to Canada in 1852. Weir moved to Montreal, Quebec with his family as an infant, where his father became a Surveyor of Customs in the Port of Montreal. His brother, William Alexander Weir, was born there and would later become a Cabinet Minister in the Legislative Assembly of Quebec. His sister, the temperance activist, Elizabeth Weir McLachlan, was married to Robert Wallace McLachlan, the Canadian numismatist.

Weir studied at McGill Normal School, Montreal, and at the age of 19, was appointed principal of Sherbrooke Street School, one of the newest and largest Montreal public schools at the time. He continued his studies at McGill University earning his Bachelor of Civil Law in 1880 and a Doctor of Civil Law in 1897.

In 1882, he married Margaret (Gertie) Alexander Douglas, daughter of wealthy Montreal businessman Alexander Douglas. They had six children, two sons, Douglas (the eldest), and Albert (Ronald) Weir, (1901 - 1944), and four daughters, Beatrice, Winnifred, Marjorie and Dorothy Douglas Weir. Marjorie Douglas Weir would become known for her role in a movement to provide children's playgrounds in Montreal. Robert himself was known to be Vice-President of the Parks & Playgrounds association, in 1922. The family divided their time between Montreal and a summer home named Cedarhurst, in Cedarville, a picturesque hamlet on the east shore of Lac Memphrémagog in the Eastern Townships of Quebec.

== Career ==
From 1881, Weir practised law in Montreal and took a particular interest in municipal questions and had several of his studies published. In 1892, he ran unsuccessfully as a Liberal for the Montreal No. 4 riding of the Legislative Assembly of Quebec. In 1898, he was one of several eminent advocates appointed to revise the charter of the City of Montreal. It is believed that, in particular, he wrote many of the sections relating to expropriations and the power of the city to pass by-laws.

On May 6, 1899, he was appointed Recorder for Montreal. During this time as a recorder, he also taught liturgics and jurisprudence in the Congregational College of Canada, which was affiliated with McGill University. Weir later served as a municipal court judge and was considered an expert on the historical aspects of municipal law. He was later appointed a local judge in admiralty for the Exchequer Court of Canada in 1926. In 1923, he was honoured as a Fellow of the Royal Society of Canada.

=== "O Canada" ===
In 1908, Weir wrote English lyrics for "O Canada" while at his summer home, Cedarhurst, in time to honour the 300th anniversary of the founding of Quebec City.

The French version had originally been commissioned in 1880 by the Lieutenant Governor of Quebec, Théodore Robitaille with lyrics by Sir Adolphe Basile Routhier and music composed by Calixa Lavallée in time for the Congrès national des Canadiens-Français which was to be held on St. Jean Baptiste Day of that year. The popularity of the song grew quickly in Quebec and was played frequently at special events in the province.

English versions began to appear almost immediately. The first evidence of official use of any version of "O Canada" in Anglophone Canada was 1901, when school children sang it for that year's tour of Canada by the Duke and Duchess of Cornwall, later King George V and Queen Mary). By the time Weir wrote his version in 1908, there were more than a hundred English quasi-translations of the French original (whose lyrics have never changed). But it was Weir's version that became the most popular one.

The tune was already popular across the country, and with Weir's popular lyrics "O Canada" swiftly joined "God Save the King" as co-national anthem by custom, though neither of them had been statutorily declared national anthems. At the time of confederation in 1867, many Anglophones advocated for "The Maple Leaf Forever" to be their national anthem. But while it was often used alongside "God Save the King" at official functions in Anglophone areas of the country, no French version was ever produced making it impossible for that song to ever become Canada's national anthem. Other alternatives faced similar problems.

Many Canadians know only part of Weir's original 1908 lyrics, though this increasingly is changing, as digital information, reaches even remotest parts of Canada:

O Canada! Our home, our native land.
True patriot love thou dost in us command.

We see thee rising fair, dear land,
The True North strong and free;

And stand on guard, O Canada,
We stand on guard for thee.

O Canada! O Canada!
O Canada, we stand on guard for thee!
O Canada, we stand on guard for thee!

The complete form of the song, including Judge Weir's verses two through four, has increasingly recovered to reflection and modern usage among Canadians, as a hymnal spiritual expression of their appeal to God the "Ruler Supreme" of Canada's ongoing future, as Weir intended.

The lyrics are:

O Canada! Our home and native land,

True patriot love in all thy sons command.

With glowing hearts, we see thee rise,

The True North strong and free.

From far and wide, O Canada,

We stand on guard for thee.

  God, keep our land glorious and free!

  O Canada, we stand on guard for thee.
  O Canada, we stand on guard for thee.

O Canada! Where pines and maples grow.

Great prairies spread and lordly rivers flow.

How dear to us thy broad domain,

From East to Western sea.

Thou land of hope for all who toil,

Thou True North, strong and free!

  God, keep our land glorious and free!

  O Canada, we stand on guard for thee.
  O Canada, we stand on guard for thee.

O Canada! Beneath thy shining skies

May stalwart sons and gentle maidens rise,

To keep thee steadfast through the years

From East to Western sea,

Our own beloved native land,

Our True North, strong and free!

  God, keep our land glorious and free!

  O Canada, we stand on guard for thee.
  O Canada, we stand on guard for thee.

Ruler Supreme, Who hearest humble pray’r,

Hold our dominion within Thy loving care.

Help us to find, O God, in Thee

A lasting, rich reward,

As waiting for the Better Day,

We ever stand on guard.

  God, keep our land glorious and free!

  O Canada, we stand on guard for thee.
  O Canada, we stand on guard for thee.

The original French lyrics, written by Sir Adolphe-Basile Routhier in 1880 include lines like “ Le Canadien a grandi dans l'espoir.

Il est né d'une race fière” which roughly translates to “ The Canadian grew up with hope. He was born of a proud race” and “Parmi les races étrangères, Notre guide est la loi” roughly meaning “Among foreign races, Our guide is the law”

Weir amended the lyrics slightly in 1913, 1914 and 1916, ultimately producing the following version:

O Canada! Our home and native land.
True patriot love in all thy sons command.

With glowing hearts we see thee rise,
The True North strong and free!

And stand on guard, O Canada!
We stand on guard for thee.

O Canada, glorious and free.
We stand on guard, we stand on guard for thee!

O Canada! We stand on guard for thee!

One final change was made to the penultimate line after Weir died - and is preserved in a recording made by tenor Edward Johnson in 1928:

O Canada, glorious and free,
We stand on guard, we stand on guard for thee!
O Canada! We stand on guard for thee!

Became:

O Canada! Glorious and free!
O Canada! We stand on guard for thee!
O Canada! We stand on guard for thee!

The 1916 version, which is substantially shorter than the full song, continued to be used for official occasions until 1980, when Parliament changed the lyrics upon statutory adoption of "O Canada" as the national anthem (still with no change to the original French lyrics):

O Canada! Our home and native land!
True patriot love in all thy sons command.

With glowing hearts we see thee rise,
The True North strong and free!

From far and wide, O Canada,
We stand on guard for thee.

God keep our land glorious and free!

O Canada, We stand on guard for thee.
O Canada, We stand on guard for thee.

On February 7, 2018, legislation that proposed to change the line "True patriot love in all thy sons command" to "True patriot love in all of us command" received royal assent, and the change became law. Canada’s official National Anthem Act does not include Weir’s full song.

== Death and legacy ==
Cedarhurst, at Lac Memphrémagog c. 1900 where Weir wrote "O Canada"

Weir died on August 20, 1926, at Lac Memphrémagog, Quebec, Canada.

Weir's verses of "O Canada" were published in an official form for the Diamond Jubilee of Confederation in 1927, and gradually became the most generally accepted anthem in English-speaking Canada, completely winning out over the alternatives by the 1960s.

In seeking to enact "O Canada" as the national anthem officially, a Special Joint Committee of the Senate and House of Commons was struck. In 1968, the committee recommended changes to the English version–replacing one of the repeated phrases "We stand on guard for thee" with "From far and wide" and one "O Canada" with "God keep our land".

The committee also thought it appropriate for the government to acquire copyright to the words and music. Canadian copyright laws held for 50 years beyond the author's death so there was no trouble with the copyright for the music but the heirs of Weir objected to the changes to the words. Since Weir died in 1926, it would not be in the public domain until 1976. Evidence was found that the copyright had actually descended to Gordon V. Thompson, a music publisher, who agreed to sell it to the government in 1970 for the nominal sum of $1. The committee, however, still hoped to settle the matter amicably with Weir's family, if at all possible.

Finally, on July 1, 1980, 100 years after Routhier and Lavallée penned the hymn, the National Anthem Act officially proclaimed the French and modified English versions as the National Anthem of Canada. Today, "God Save the King" is Canada's royal anthem, while "The Maple Leaf Forever" is rarely heard.

Two provinces have adopted Latin translations of phrases from the English lyrics as their mottos: Manitoba —Gloriosus et liber (glorious and free)— and Alberta —Fortis et liber (strong and free). Similarly, the motto of Canadian Forces Land Force Command is Vigilamus pro te (we stand on guard for thee). As well, the motto for the 2010 Vancouver Winter Olympics was "with glowing hearts".

A postage stamp was issued in honour of Weir, Lavallée, and Routhier on June 6, 1980, and on May 24, 1999, a monument for Judge Weir was erected in Weir Memorial Park, on the shores of Lac Memphrémagog, near where he wrote the famous lyrics. A Montreal street is named Rue Stanley Weir in his honour.

In recent years, the English version of the anthem has been criticized, by feminists such as Senator Vivienne Poy, for being sexist ("true patriot love in all thy sons command"); alternate lyrics ("in all of us command", "in all our hearts command" or "thou dost in us command") have been proposed but are not widely supported.

Weir's grandson, Steve Simpson, says the word "son" is not about gender, but a reference to a patriotic command from a maternal goddess.

== Works ==
- Bills of Exchange Act 1890
- Education Act
- Civil Code
- Code of Civil Procedure
- Municipal Code

=== Published works ===
- — (1889). Review of D.J. Macdonnell's sermon entitled "Death abolished": Preached in St. Andrew's church, Toronto, Sunday, 3rd March, 1889. ISBN 0-66540506-5.
- — (1890). An insolvency manual containing the articles of the Code of civil procedure relating to abandonment of property, capias ad respondendum, attachments before judgment and revendication: together with notes upon conservatory attachment. Montreal: A. Periard. OCLC 1174856.
- — (1897). The administration of the old régime in Canada (D.C.L.). Montreal: L.E. & A.F. Waters.
- — (1903). The Municipal Code of the Province of Quebec. Montreal: C. Theoret. OCLC 24581846.
- —. Gone West.
- — (1908). O Canada. Delmar Music Co.
- — (1917). After Ypres, and other verse. Toronto: Musson. OCLC 6522680.
- — (1922). Poems: Early And Late. Toronto: Oxford University Press. OCLC 301589267.
