= Emil Voigt (numismatist) =

American numismatist and collector (1909–1998)

- Born: January 29, 1909
- Died: July 22, 1998 (aged 89)
- Education: New York University; American Institute of Banking
- Occupations: Banker, numismatist
- Spouse: Irma Bremermann
- Children: Emil Jr. and Richard F.
- Awards: Howland Wood Memorial Award (1974); Numismatic News Numismatic Ambassador (1994)

Emil Voigt (January 29, 1909 – July 22, 1998) was an American numismatist and collector who rose to prominence in the New York-area numismatic community. He was a longtime exhibitor of coins, medals, and medallic art, and received recognition from the American Numismatic Association (ANA).

== Early life and career ==
Voigt graduated from New York University and studied at the American Institute of Banking. In 1935, Voigt began working for U.S. Trust, where he remained for 36 years before retiring in 1971. He spent much of his career at the bank's headquarters at 45 Wall Street in New York City.

== Numismatics ==
Emil Voigt receives the Howland Wood Memorial Award from head exhibit judge Richard Yeoman at the 1974 ANA convention.

Voigt was an active member of the ANA from 1944 until his death in 1998, receiving his 50-year membership medal in 1994. He was also a member of the American Numismatic Society (ANS) and a charter member and past president of the Long Island Coin Club, and regularly attended meetings of the Brooklyn Coin Club. He had been collecting for more than 40 years by 1976. Voigt also contributed to The Numismatist and assisted with registration and exhibit judging at ANA conventions.

In 1974, Voigt became the 4,000th member of the American Israel Numismatic Association (AINA).

Voigt's interests included coins, medals, and medallic art, with particular attention to the work of sculptors. He developed a friendship with sculptor Anthony de Francisci, designer of the Peace dollar, and his wife, Teresa. At the 1972 Grand Central coin convention, Voigt served as hospitality chairman and presented a special display titled A Symphony in Coinage and Medallic Art, incorporating items from his collection of de Francisci's work. In 1974, Voigt presented extensive competitive and noncompetitive displays of de Francisci's coins, letters, pictures, and art at a Long Island Coin Club convention. Teresa de Francisci, who modeled for her husband's portrait of Liberty on the obverse of the Peace dollar, was the honored guest at the awards banquet.

Voigt was an active exhibitor at coin conventions and received numerous awards for his competitive displays. In 1974, his exhibit Sculptors and Their Medals received the Howland Wood Memorial Award for Best-of-Show Exhibit at the ANA's 83rd Anniversary Convention in Miami. The ANA describes the Howland Wood Memorial Award as the most prestigious award it gives to exhibitors. Voigt's exhibit featured medallic art by prominent sculptors from the United States, England, and Italy and traced the production of an art medal from the planchet strip to the finished medal.

Voigt continued to participate in numismatic exhibits in subsequent years. At the ANA's 90th Anniversary Convention in 1981, he and his wife, Irma, presented a noncompetitive exhibit of the medallic art of Hungarian-born British sculptor Paul Vincze. Voigt had long admired Vincze and had visited his studio in London's Chelsea, assembling a widely acclaimed collection of his work.

In addition to his collecting activities, Voigt researched his family's history and sought to establish a connection between his family and Henry Voigt, chief coiner of the Philadelphia Mint from 1793 to 1814. He also served as a member of the United States Assay Commission in 1966.

In 1994, Voigt was named a Numismatic News Numismatic Ambassador.

== Personal life ==
On April 12, 1935, Voigt married Irma Bremermann (December 23, 1916 – June 6, 2008). They had two sons, Emil Jr. and Richard F. Voigt, and several grandchildren and great-grandchildren. By 1981, he and his wife were living in Cutchogue, Suffolk County, New York, having relocated from Valley Stream in Nassau County, New York, where Voigt had lived since at least the 1950s. He died on July 22, 1998, at the age of 89.

== Gymnastics and Olympic collecting ==
Voigt was also a gymnast. In his reminiscences published as an article in Rare Coin Review in 1987–88, he recalled that preparing for the 1932 United States Olympic trials in gymnastics took up much of his free time. He described training on the flying rings, side horse, long horse, parallel bars, and horizontal bar, and mentioned his participation as a member under the auspices of the American Gymnastic Union. Voigt's account describes his involvement in the Olympic trials rather than the Olympic Games themselves. He kept certificates and medallic emblems from his gymnastics activities, which formed the basis of his collection of Olympic memorabilia. He continued to expand this collection up until the 1984 Los Angeles Olympics.

=== Voigt and the Olympic historical record ===
A biography published by Bowers & Merena Galleries following Voigt's death stated that he had “at one time [been] a member of the United States Olympic Gymnastic Team.” In his own account, however, Voigt described only his preparation for the 1932 Olympic trials. The official record of the 1932 Games lists five members of the United States men's gymnastics team—Frank Haubold, Fred Meyer, Al Jochim, Frank Cumiskey, and Michael Schuler—but does not include Voigt.

The discrepancy is complicated by two other athletes named Emil Voigt with Olympic ties. Emil Voigt (1879–1946), an American gymnast associated with Concordia Turnverein in St. Louis, competed at the 1904 Summer Olympics and won a silver medal in club swinging and bronze medals in rings and rope climbing. Emil Voigt (1883–1973), a British distance runner from Manchester, won the five-mile race at the 1908 Summer Olympics. The two Olympic athletes have themselves been confused with each other in historical accounts. A 2008 article in the Journal of Olympic History considered whether the 1904 American gymnast and the 1908 British runner might have been the same person. It ultimately concluded that they were probably separate individuals, although it noted that some uncertainty remained.
