= Howland Wood =

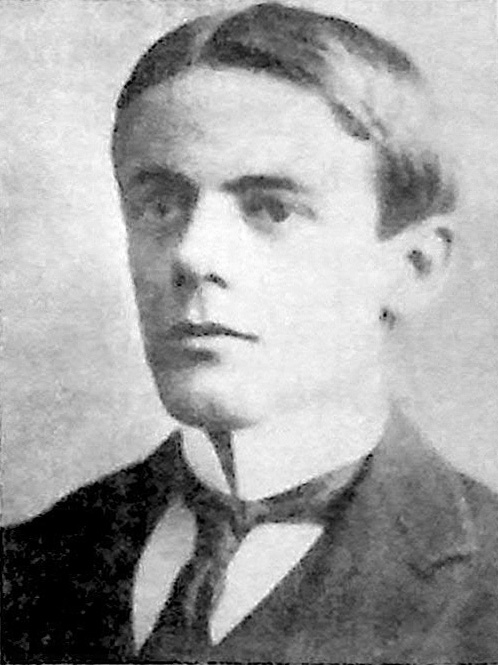
- Born: May 30, 1877; New Bedford, Massachusetts, U.S.
- Died: January 4, 1938 (aged 60); Flushing, Queens, New York, U.S.
- Occupations: Numismatist, author
- Years active: 1900–1938
- Known for: Numismatic scholarship
- Notable work: The Canadian Blacksmith Coppers

Howland Wood (May 30, 1877 – January 4, 1938) was an American numismatist and former chairman of the American Numismatic Association (ANA).

== Early life ==
Wood was born in New Bedford, Massachusetts, in 1877. He graduated with a Bachelor of Arts from Brown University in 1900. He lived in Boston, where he had a photo engraving business.

== Career ==
Letter from Theodore Roosevelt to Howland Wood, November 21, 1907

Wood had a long association with the American numismatic community. He served as general secretary of the American Numismatic Association from 1905 to 1909, and then as governor and chairman from 1909 to 1912. While serving as ANA secretary, Wood corresponded with President Theodore Roosevelt concerning the new United States gold coinage designed by Augustus Saint-Gaudens. In a letter dated November 21, 1907, Roosevelt expressed his pleasure with Wood's favorable comments on the new double eagle design and wrote that securing "a great artist like Saint-Gaudens to design our coinage" had been "a chance not to be mist [sic]," adding, "What a loss his death has been!"

Wood was secretary of the Boston Numismatic Society from 1908 to 1913. He became an associate editor of The Numismatist from 1909 to 1910, and was an associate editor and later editor of the American Journal of Numismatics from 1910 to 1920.

=== American Numismatic Society ===
Wood's work for the American Numismatic Society took him to New York City in 1913. He served as curator of the American Numismatic Society Museum from 1913 to 1938.

== Publications ==
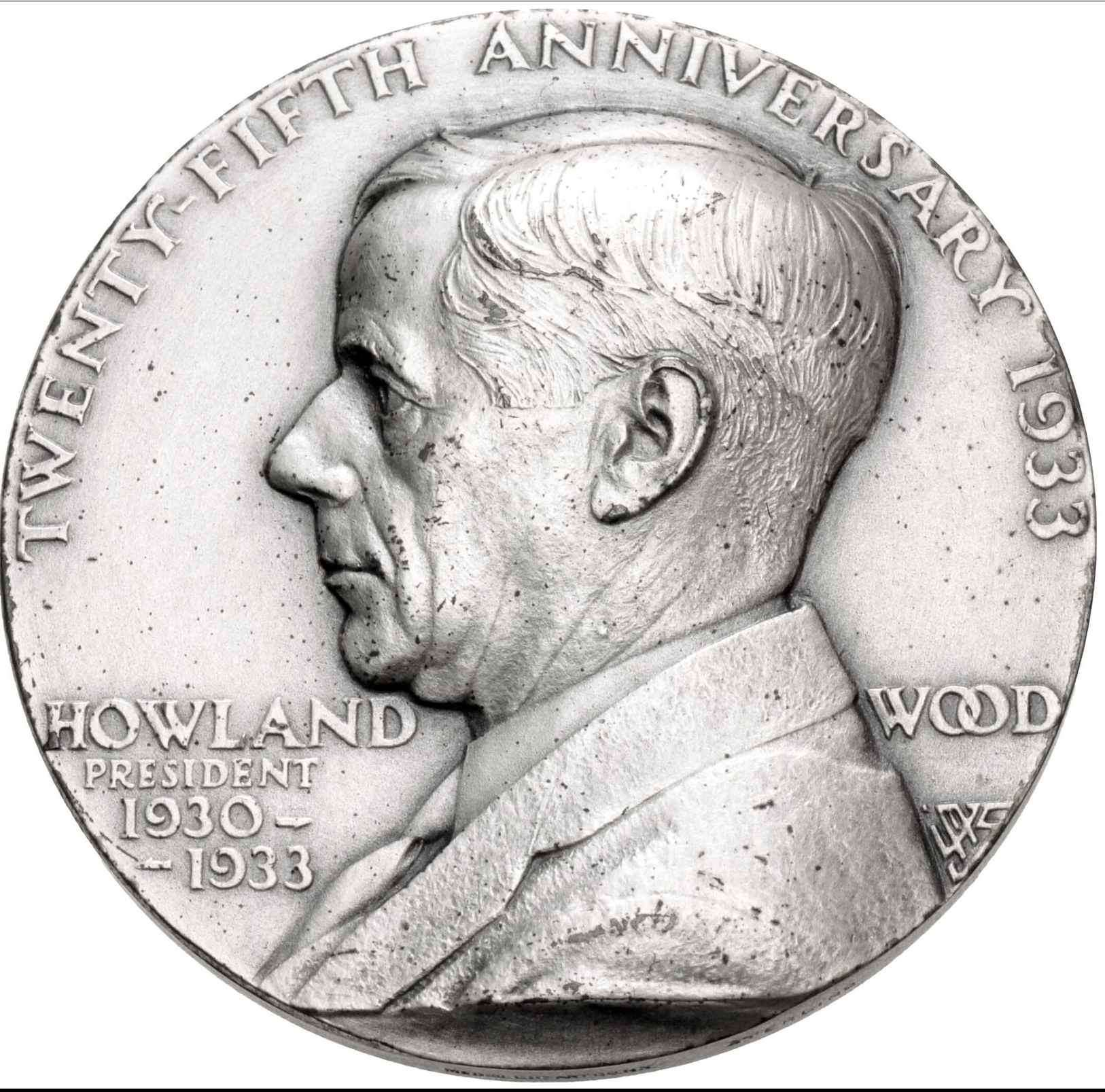
Obverse of NYNC presidential medal depicting a bust of Howland Wood, inscribed “HOWLAND–WOOD / PRESIDENT / 1930–1933.” Image courtesy of CNG, www.cngcoins.com

Wood was the author of several numismatic publications, including:

- The Coinage of Siam and Its Dependencies (1904)
- The Canadian Blacksmith Coppers (1910)
- Catalogue of United States and Colonial Coins (1914)
- Coinage of West Indies and Sou Marqué (1915)
- The Mexican Revolutionary Coinage, 1913-1916 (1921)
- The Gold Dollars of 1858 with Notes of the Other Issues (1922)
- The Commemorative Coinage of the United States (1922)
- The Tegucigalpa Coinage of 1823 (1923)
- The Coinage of Ethiopia (1937)

== Lifetime honors ==
Wood received the Archer M. Huntington Award from the American Numismatic Society (ANS) in 1920. He served as president of the New York Numismatic Club (NYNC) from 1930 to 1933, and the club honored him with a presidential medal designed by Jonathan M. Swanson. He was a Fellow of the American Numismatic Society and the Royal Numismatic Society (RNS).

== Personal life ==
Wood married Elizabeth Marvin in 1913, and they had two daughters, Elizabeth and Sylvia Howland. He died of pneumonia in Flushing, Queens in early 1938.

== Legacy ==
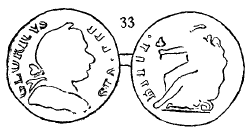
Wood's illustration of the blacksmith token "Wood 33".

=== Blacksmith tokens ===
Within Canadian numismatics, Wood is best remembered for his work on blacksmith tokens, which he first systematically described in a 1910 publication. While other Canadian numismatists had commented on them before, Wood was the first to categorize them. His numbering system is still used today.

=== Howland Wood Memorial Award ===
Beginning in 1952, the ANA presented the Howland Wood Memorial Award for Best-of-Show Exhibit, its most prestigious award for numismatic exhibitors. The ANA presents the award at its annual summer convention, now known as the World's Fair of Money, held in cities throughout the United States. The recipient is selected from among the first-place winners of the ANA's judged class-level exhibit competition. Through 2026, the award has been presented 74 times to 55 exhibitors, including 54 individuals and one organization.

The recipients and titles or subjects of their winning exhibits are listed below. ANA exhibit rules were changed around 1970 to require exhibitors to display exhibit titles inside their cases. Earlier reports often did not record exhibit titles, so for most early winners only the subject is known, indicated with quotation marks; for others, neither the title (if present) nor the subject has been recovered.

Year	Exhibitor	Exhibit Title or Subject	Convention Location
1952	J. Hewitt Judd	"United States patterns, trial or experimental pieces, and types of early United States coins"	New York City, NY
1953	William A. Philpott, Jr.	"United States Currency and Texas Currency"	Dallas, TX
1954	New York Orders and Decorations Society	"World orders and decorations"	Cleveland, OH
1955	Burton H. Saxton	[title/subject unpublished]	Omaha, NE
1956	Robert F. Schermerhorn	"Die proofs of the 1896 $1.00 to $50.00 notes, national bank first and second charter notes, silver certificates, coin notes and legal tender notes"	Chicago, IL
1957	Amon G. Carter, Jr.	"U. S. and Canadian currency"	Philadelphia, PA
1958	August F. Hausske	[title/subject unpublished]	Los Angeles, CA
1959	Clifford L. Liss	"Coins of the Philippines under U. S. and coins commemorating Declaration of Independence"	Portland, OR
1960	Patricia M. Nestor	"Massachusetts money"	Boston, MA
1961	Robert Earl Cox, Jr.	"Patterns, complete regular issues and commemorative"	Atlanta, GA
1962	Gaston DiBello	"United States and foreign gold coins"	Detroit, MI
1963	Julius Turoff	"Collection of United States coins"	Denver, CO
1964	Fred R. Marckhoff	"Obsolete paper money of Indian Territory"	Cleveland, OH
1965	Robert E. Medlar	Republic of Texas, 1836–45	Houston, TX
1966	George L. Podlusky	Orders, Decorations and Medals of Bavaria	Chicago, IL
1967	Julio M. Ruiz Laabes	"Coins and bills of Puerto Rico"	Miami, FL
1968	Opal H. Morris	U. S. Silver Commemorative Coins in Historical Arrangement	San Diego, CA
1969	Lelan G. Rogers	[title/subject unpublished]	Philadelphia, PA
1970	Margaret Frantz	A Study of the Cobs of Colonial Spain	St. Louis, MO
1971	David R. Cervin	Pre-1500 (Anno Domini) Dated Coins	Washington, DC
1972	Frank O'Sullivan	Great Rarities in Ancient Bronze	New Orleans, LA
1973	Raymond A. Byrne	[title/subject unpublished]	Boston, MA
1974	Emil Voigt, Sr.	Sculptors and Their Medals	Miami, FL
1975	Peter E. Brander	Nueva España Silver and Copper Types	Los Angeles, CA
1976	C. Radford Stearns	Colonial Georgia Paper Money of 1776	New York City, NY
1977	Maurice M. Burgett	Great Rarities of Obsolete U. S. Currency and Scrip	Atlanta, GA
1978	Stephen R. Taylor	U. S. $1 Notes, 1862–1929	Houston, TX
1979	Sammy L. Whipple, Sr.	The Gold Coinage of King George III	St. Louis, MO
1980	Jean A. Bullen	Victorian Coinage of the Present Canadian Maritime Provinces from 1861 to 1900	Cincinnati, OH
1981	Jack D. Huggins, Sr.	St. Louis World's Fair Elongated Cents	New Orleans, LA
1982	Denis W. Loring	The United States Cents of 1794	Boston, MA
1983	Frank M. Rose	The Wonderful World of Chopmarks on Chinese Dollars	San Diego, CA
1984	Nancy Opitz Wilson	Type Set of Second Issue U. S. Fractional Currency	Detroit, MI
1985	Robert F. Kriz	British Sovereigns, 1817 to 1982	Baltimore, MD
1986	Jean A. Bullen	The 50-Cent Decimal Coinage of Canada and Newfoundland — 1870–1985	Milwaukee, WI
1987	R. Wayne Colbert	Agricultural Medals of Great Britain	Atlanta, GA
1988	William F. Spengler	The Satamana System, South Asia's Oldest Coinage	Cincinnati, OH
1989	John E. Page	Coins of India: Punchmarked Coins, 6th Century to 2nd Century B.C.	Pittsburgh, PA
1990	Thomas H. Law	500 Years of English Sovereigns — A Type Set	Chicago, IL
1991	Gene Hessler	Max Svabinsky — Czechoslovak Designer, His Complete Works	Chicago, IL
1992	Thomas H. Law	The Gold Coin Types of George III	Orlando, FL
1993	Thomas H. Law	The Large Milled English Gold Coin Types	Baltimore, MD
1994	Herbert H. Espy	Martin Luther — A Medallic Biography	Detroit, MI
1995	Joseph E. Boling	Building a National Currency — Japan, 1868–1899	Anaheim, CA
1996	Peter C. Smith	The Challenging Literature of A. M. Smith	Denver, CO
1997	Kenneth R. Hill	Double-Struck Capped Bust Half Dollars	New York City, NY
1998	Georg H. Förster	Latin American Silver in Worldwide Circulation from the 16th to the 20th Century	Portland, OR
1999	Thomas H. Law	The Guineas and Milled Sovereigns of England	Chicago, IL
2000	Lawrence Sekulich	Arethusa: A Numismatic Muse	Philadelphia, PA
2001	Thomas H. Law	104 Rare English Gold Coins, 1344–1839	Atlanta, GA
2002	Samuel D. Deep	The Exonumia of Higher Education	New York City, NY
2003	Leonard Vaccaro	A Selection of U. S. Mint Medals from the War of 1812, Engraved by Moritz Fuerst	Baltimore, MD
2004	David Menchell	Medals of Conflict, Medals of Conquest: The Numismatic Legacy of the French and Indian War	Pittsburgh, PA
2005	Steven J. D’Ippolito	The ‘Little Gray Coins’: Russia’s Experiment with Circulating Platinum Coinage, 1828–1845	San Francisco, CA
2006	Steven J. D’Ippolito	A Selection of Romanov Portrait Rubles	Denver, CO
2007	Steven J. D’Ippolito	Russian Coins of Conquest	Milwaukee, WI
2008	Mack Martin	State of Georgia Currency Certificates, 1861–1865	Baltimore, MD
2009	Christopher Marchase	The Personal Coinage of Joseph Lesher	Los Angeles, CA
2010	Brett D. Irick	Canadian Coins of 1947–1948	Boston, MA
2011	Robert Rhue	A Complete Collection of Regular-Issue North American Horsecar Tokens	Chicago, IL
2012	David Menchell	Taking Care of Business: A Selection of Early Philadelphia Merchant Tokens Issued prior to the Civil War	Philadelphia, PA
2013	Lawrence Sekulich	Hwenne Gold Was Smite in Coign	Chicago, IL
2014	Mack Martin	Baby Bonds	Chicago, IL
2015	Lawrence Sekulich	They Flap, Flutter and Float: Various Winged Immortals Appearing on Coins from Ancient to Modern Times	Chicago, IL
2016	Michael T. Shutterly	In the Beginning... When Man Created Coins	Anaheim, CA
2017	Robert Rhue	The Colored Seal Notes of Colonial Georgia	Denver, CO
2018	Michael T. Shutterly	Golden Portraits of Byzantium: Every Picture Tells a Story	Philadelphia, PA
2019	Michael A. Kodysz	Virtus & Victoria: Coins Relating to the Severan War Against the Tribes of Caledonia	Chicago, IL
2020	Exhibit competition not held; convention canceled due to COVID-19 pandemic		Pittsburgh, PA (canceled)
2021	Michael A. Kodysz	Prince of Youth: Coinage Traces the Rise and Fall of Publius Septimius Geta	Chicago, IL
2022	Michael T. Shutterly	Shining Lights in an Age of Darkness	Chicago, IL
2023	Michael A. Kodysz	I Was a Teenage Emperor: Decoding Denarii from the Eastern Mints of Elagabalus	Pittsburgh, PA
2024	Michael A. Kodysz	Lands Across the Sea: Connections to the African Continent on Coinage of the Later Roman World	Chicago, IL
2025	Michael T. Shutterly	Tragic Dynasty: The Heraclians of Byzantium	Oklahoma City, OK
2026	Michael A. Kodysz	Last Years of Caracalla: Numismatic Propaganda and the Path to the East 214–217 CE	Pittsburgh, PA

=== ANA Numismatic Hall of Fame ===
Wood was inducted into the American Numismatic Association's Numismatic Hall of Fame in 1969, as one of its first nine inductees. The Hall of Fame, established in 1964 to honor important figures in numismatics, is located at the ANA headquarters in Colorado Springs, Colorado, where plaques commemorate the honorees.

== Bibliography ==
- Smith, Pete (2025). American Numismatic Biographies. Internet Archive.
