= Paul Vincze =

Hungarian sculptor (1907–1994)

Paul Vincze (14 August 1907 – 5 March 1994) was a Jewish-Hungarian designer of coins and medals, and sculptor. Vincze's artistic works featured the classical artistic style as shown on the coins he designed. His work was part of the sculpture event in the art competition at the 1948 Summer Olympics. He was born in Galgagyörk, Hungary and died in Grasse, France.

== Education and career ==
Vincze studied art at the Hungarian University of Arts and Design in Budapest, followed by private study under medallist Ede Talcs and in Rome from 1935 to 1937, supported by a travelling scholarship. He returned to Hungary after his studies, but moved to England in 1938 because of Nazi persecution. He set up a studio in London and became a British citizen in 1948. He became an Art Workers' Guild member and a Fellow of the Royal Society of British Sculptors (FRBS) in 1961, until he retired in 1978.

== Medals ==
Vincze designed medals for both the government of Israel and Isnumat, a private Israeli mint. Medals he did for the Israeli government include the 1966 Commemorative for Edmond and James de Rothschild and the 1967 Jubilee of the Balfour Declaration. For Isnumat, he did medals of the John F. Kennedy Memorial and the Visit of Pope Paul VI to the Holy Land.

His other works include:

1. medal for the 300th Anniversary of the Jewish Resettlement in Great Britain (1956)
2. medals of distinguished Jews such as Ben-Gurion, Lord Samuel and Yehudi Menuhin

== Coinage ==
He designed a set of coins of Malawi just before his death. Earlier he designed some currency for the countries of Ghana, Libya, Nigeria, Malawi and Guinea.

== Awards ==
He was recognized by several organizations and received the following awards:

1. a Premio Especial at the International Exhibition, Madrid, 1951;
2. a silver medal at the Paris Salon, 1964; and
3. the first gold medal of the American Numismatic Association, 1966.
