= Evasion (numismatics) =

Counterfeit coins designed to avoid violating counterfeit laws

In numismatics, an evasion (also evasion coin, evasion token) is a close copy of a coin with just enough deviation in design and/or legend to avoid violating counterfeit laws. The best-known evasions appeared in the 18th century in Great Britain and Ireland.

== Details ==
To counteract the large numbers of underweight, counterfeit copper halfpennies and farthings circulating in 18th-century Britain, Section 6 of the Counterfeiting Coin Act 1741 made it a crime, punishable by 2 years' imprisonment, to “make, coin or counterfeit any brass or copper money, commonly called a halfpenny or a farthing”; this act was followed by the even stricter Counterfeiting of Copper Coin Act 1771, which made the passing of counterfeit coppers a felony.

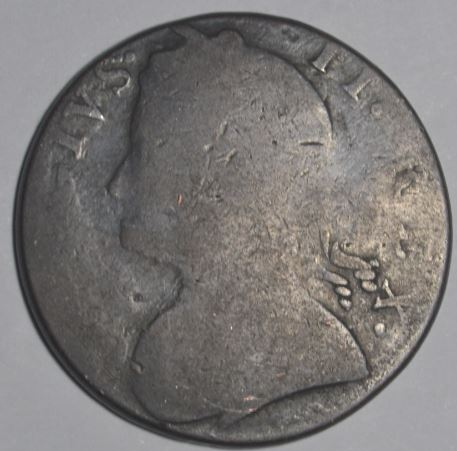
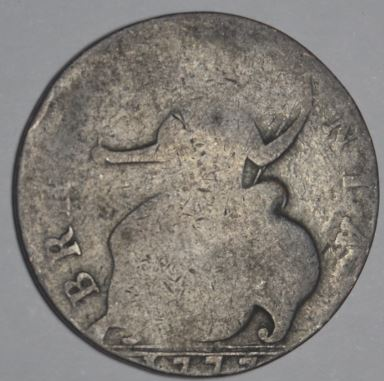
Evasion halfpenny, obv.: bust and inscription of George II, rev.: Britannia and date 1777, incompatible with obverse

However, counterfeiters soon evaded the law by striking “coins” with designs or inscriptions slightly different from the originals; if caught, they would claim their products were different and not counterfeits. These pieces usually had a bust on the obverse – often resembling King George III, or some other well known figure – and a seated Britannia or a harp (for Ireland) on the reverse. Instead of the correct obverse legend “Georgius III Rex”, it may read “George Rules,” “George Reigns” or similar. The reverse legend “Britannia” might be replaced by something like “Briton’s Happy Isles.” Counterfeiters often made their coins look quite worn, some would not add a date or only put a partial date on the die. They also often used earlier dates, such as making halfpence dated 1771 in 1778, or making halfpence with dates and the image of the previous king George II. The makers of these lightweight pieces did not worry about being caught, as the law did not cover “evasions.”

In addition to circulating in the British Isles, large quantities of evasion (and other) counterfeit copper coins were also shipped to British America and the United States, particularly from the mid-18th century and especially after 1771.

== See also ==
- Conder token
