= John Howard Hickcox Sr. =

- Born: August 10, 1832; Albany, New York, U.S.
- Died: January 31, 1897 (aged 64); Washington, D.C., U.S.
- Occupations: Librarian; bookseller; numismatist

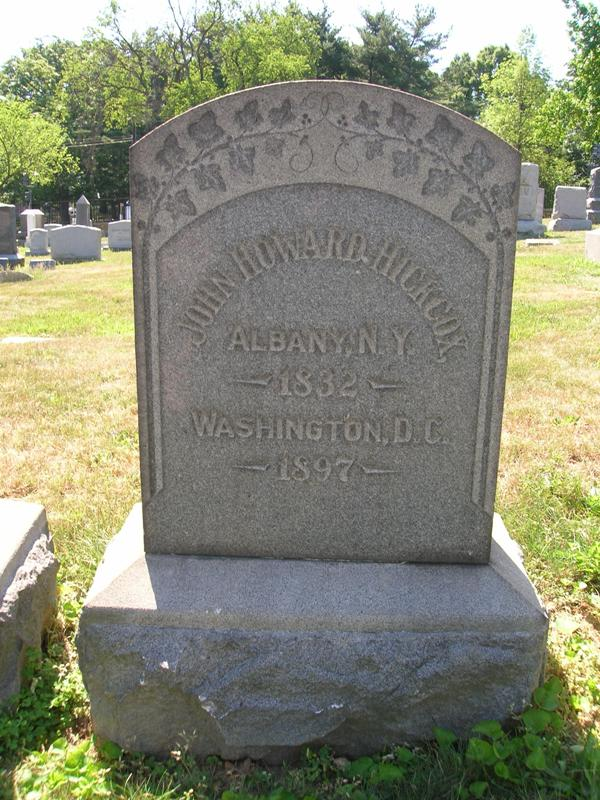
Hickcox Gravestone

John Howard Hickcox Sr. (August 10, 1832 – January 31, 1897), a nineteenth-century librarian and bookseller, is best known for his efforts to organize and index federal government publications. He published United States Government Publications; a Monthly Catalogue, also known as Hickcox's Monthly Catalogue, from 1885 to 1894 in order to alert people to the availability of recent government publications—a function which the government was not performing. His catalog was the predecessor of the Monthly Catalog, of which he was the first compiler.

From 1858 to 1864, he was the Assistant Librarian at the New York State Library. He was employed at the congressional library in Washington, D.C. from 1874 to 1882, when he was arrested on charges of stealing letters addressed to the Librarian of Congress. The charges were eventually dismissed, but he never returned to the library.

Hickcox was also a famous numismatist, and wrote books such as A History of the Bills of Credit or Paper Money Issued by New York, From 1709 to 1789 with a Description of the Bills, and Catalogue of the Various Issues and Historical Account of American Coinage.
