= Robert Wallace McLachlan =

Canadian numismatist

Robert Wallace McLachlan (9 March 1845 – 10 May 1926), was a prolific early Canadian numismatist, who published many works focusing primarily on pre-Canadian Confederation coins, tokens and medals. He lived in Montreal, and was for many years the Treasurer and Curator of The Canadian Antiquarian and Numismatic Journal. Along with fellow early Canadian numismatists Alfred Sandham, and P. N. Breton and Joseph Leroux, his publications are considered to have laid the foundations for Canadian numismatic research.

In 1894, P. N. Breton stated that McLachlan's coin collection was the most extensive in Canada with over 8,000 pieces, ranging from ancient Greek issues to contemporary coins. McLachlan sold his collection in its entirety to The Canadian Antiquarian and Numismatic Society of Montreal in 1922, which at that time had grown to an estimated 20,000 pieces.

== Personal life ==
In October 1876, he married the temperance activist, Elizabeth Weir, daughter of William Park Weir, and sister of William Alexander Weir and Robert Stanley Weir.

== Selected works ==
McLachlan published the following books and pamphlets on Canadian tokens:

- The Edward Murphy Medal, published in 1877
- Canadian Temperance Medals, published in 1879
- The French-American Colonial Jettons, published in 1884
- The Money and Medals of Canada Under the Old Regime, published in 1885
- Canadian Numismatics: A Descriptive Catalogue of Coins, Tokens and Medals Issued in or Relating to the Dominion of Canada and Newfoundland, published in 1886
- Statistics of the Coinage for Canada and Newfoundland, published in 1890
- Canadian Communion Tokens, published in 1891
- The Louisbourg Medals, published in 1891
- Annals of the Nova Scotian Currency, published in 1892
- Coins Struck in Canada Previous [to] 1840, published in 1892
- Canadian Diamond Jubilee Medals, published in 1898
- The Nova Scotian Treasury Notes, published in 1898
- Medals Awarded to the Canadian Indians, published in 1899
- Two Canadian Golden Wedding Medals, published in 1901
- The Real Date of the Canadian 1820 Harp Tokens, published in 1907

== Bibliography ==
- anonymous (January 1875). "Numismatic and Antiquarian Society". The Canadian Antiquarian and Numismatic Journal. 3 (3): 139–140.
- anonymous (November 1922). "The McLachlan Collection Sold As An Entirety". The Numismatist. 35: 553–554.
- Hudgeons, Marc; Hudgeons Jr., Thomas E. (2007). The Official Blackbook Price Guide to World Coins 2008. Random House Information Group. ISBN 9780375721694.
- Willey, R. C. (April 1969). "The History of Canadian Numismatics". The Canadian Numismatic Journal. 14 (4): 115.
