= Alfred Sandham =

Canadian numismatist

Alfred Sandham (19 November 1838 - 25 December 1910) was an early Canadian numismatist, best known as the original editor of the Canadian Antiquarian and Numismatic Journal, and for publishing one of the earliest books on Canadian tokens. His Coins, tokens and medals of the Dominion of Canada was published in 1869, and was the first to attempt to describe all pre-Canadian Confederation numismatic issues. The book focused on a description of the coins, tokens and medals relating to Canada, though it contained numerous illustrations, and Sandham also detailed the history of these pieces, where known. This work would be supplanted by the more comprehensive guides produced by P. N. Breton.

== Bibliography ==
Gallichan, Gilles. "Sandham, Alfred". Dictionary of Canadian Biography. University of Toronto/Université Laval.
