= Pierre-Napoléon Breton =

Canadian numismatist (1858–1917)

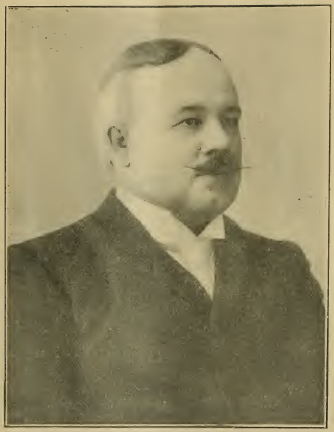
Photo of Pierre-Napoléon Breton as used in the 1912 publication of his Popular Illustrated Guide to Canadian Coins, Medals

Pierre-Napoléon Breton (1858–1917), was an early Canadian numismatist, best known for publishing a series of guides on Canadian tokens.

The numbering system Breton devised for cataloging early Canadian token is still used today. Along with R.W. McLachlan, and Joseph Leroux, his publications are considered to have laid the foundations for Canadian numismatic research.

Breton published the following books on Canadian tokens:

- Illustrated history of coins and tokens relating to Canada (Fr. Histoire illustrée des monnaies et jetons du Canada), published in 1894
- Popular Illustrated Guide to Canadian Coins, Medals (Fr. Guide populaire illustré des monnaies et médailles Canadiennes, etc., etc.), published in 1912

These books become the standard numismatic references on the subject, and for many years were the most popular reference for those interested in collecting Canadian pre-Confederation and early post-Confederation tokens. Until the Illustrated Guide started to be reprinted beginning in 1964, copies were hard to find for modern collectors.

== Bibliography ==
- Stanley, W. J. (Bill) (2018). 2019 Breton Tokens. Canadian Wholesale Supply.
- Hudgeons, Marc; Hudgeons, Jr., Thomas E. (2007). The Official Blackbook Price Guide to World Coins 2008. Random House Information Group. ISBN 9780375721694.
- Willey, R. C. (April 1969). "The History of Canadian Numismatics". The Canadian Numismatic Journal. 14 (4): 115.
- Willey, Robert C. (2011). The Annotated Colonial Coinages of Canada. PetchNet.
