= Mirabella Yacht =

Semi-custom built sailing yacht built by Concorde Yachts Thailand

Mirabella
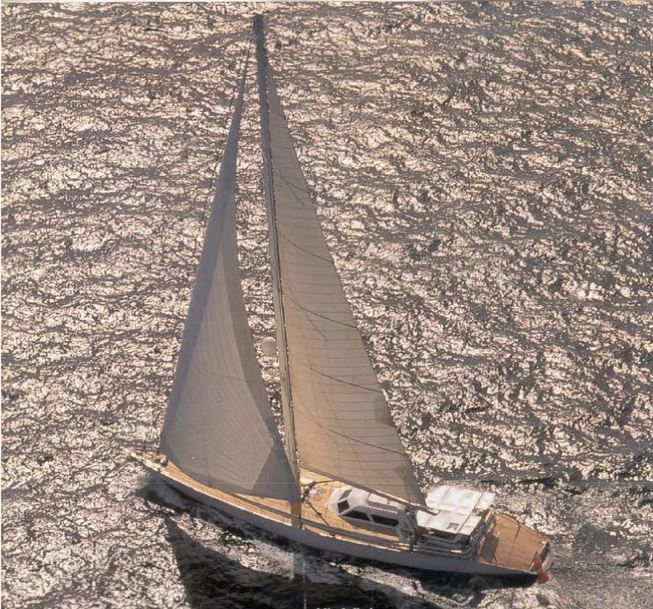

Development
- Designer: Bruce Farr
- Year: 1991-1994
- Builder: Concorde Yachts
- Name: Mirabella

Boat
- Displacement: 785,000 lb (356,000 kg)
- Draft: 9.0 ft (2.7 m)

Hull
- Type: Keelboat
- Construction: GRP
- LOA: 131 ft 2 in (39.98 m)
- LWL: 125 ft 6 in (38.25 m)
- Beam: 29 ft 8 in (9.04 m)

Hull appendages
- Keel: Fin keel with skeg hung rudder

Rig
- Rig type: Sloop
- Mast height: 164 ft 0 in (49.99 m)

Sails
- Total sail area: 7,190 sq ft (668 m^{2})

Mirabella is a semi-custom built sailing yacht built by Concorde Yachts Thailand. Three units were manufactured between 1990 and 1994. The design concept and business idea came from the Finnish entrepreneur Pekka Koskenkylä, who is better known as the founder of Nautor's Swan. Bruce Farr was chosen as the naval architecture for this project. The manufacturing method of mould released Fibre glass hand woven sandwich laminate was chosen because it facilitated the fastest possible serial production. The yacht was a very successful charter yacht back then, offering the best available space and comfort the industry had to offer. These features are nowadays considered almost an industry standard.

== Ownership ==
The Mirabella I and III were built for Mr. Joseph Vittoria, who later operated a fleet of large sailing charter yachts, including also a much larger yacht, Mirabella V. The second yacht, named Philanderer, was bult for a private owner.
