= Beneteau 50 =

Recreational keelboat built 1995–2004

Development
- Designer: Bruce Farr; Armel Briand
- Location: France
- Year: 1995
- No. built: 200
- Builder: Beneteau
- Role: Cruiser
- Name: Beneteau 50

Boat
- Displacement: 28,660 lb (13,000 kg)
- Draft: 7.55 ft (2.30 m)

Hull
- Type: monohull
- Construction: glassfibre
- LOA: 50.75 ft (15.47 m)
- LWL: 34.42 ft (10.49 m)
- Beam: 14.67 ft (4.47 m)
- Engine: Volvo Penta 80 hp (60 kW) diesel engine

Hull appendages
- Keel: Fin keel with weighted bulb
- Ballast: 9,315 lb (4,225 kg)
- Rudder: Spade-type rudder

Rig
- Rig type: Bermuda rig
- I foretriangle height: 58.04 ft (17.69 m)
- J foretriangle base: 19.85 ft (6.05 m)
- P mainsail luff: 50.89 ft (15.51 m)
- E mainsail foot: 17.72 ft (5.40 m)

Sails
- Sailplan: Masthead sloop
- Mainsail area: 450.89 sq ft (41.889 m^{2})
- Jib/genoa area: 576.05 sq ft (53.517 m^{2})
- Total sail area: 1,026.94 sq ft (95.406 m^{2})

Racing
- PHRF: 57-90

The Beneteau 50 is a recreational keelboat built by Beneteau in France, from 1995 until 2004, with 200 boats built. For the yacht charter market it was sold as the Stardust 505 and for Moorings Yacht Charter as the Moorings 503, Moorings 504 and Moorings 505, depending on the interior arrangements.

== Design ==
Designed by Bruce Farr, the hull is solid fibreglass and the deck is balsa-cored. The hull has a raked stem, a walk-through reverse transom with a swimming platform, an internally mounted spade-type rudder controlled by dual wheels and a fixed fin keel with weighted bulb or optional shoal draft keel. It displaces 28,660 lb (13,000 kg) and carries 9,315 lb (4,225 kg) of cast iron ballast.

It has a masthead sloop rig, with two sets of swept spreaders and aluminium spars with stainless steel wire standing rigging. Standard and tall masts were factory options.

The boat has a draft of 7.55 ft (2.30 m) with the standard keel and 5.92 ft (1.80 m) with the optional shoal draft keel.

The boat is fitted with a Volvo Penta 80 hp (60 kW) for docking and manoeuvring. The fuel tank holds 132 U.S. gallons (500 L; 110 imp gal) and the fresh water tank has a capacity of 264 U.S. gallons (1,000 L; 220 imp gal).

The design was built with a number of interior layouts, with three to five cabins and sleeping accommodation for six to ten people. The preferred charter boat interior has crew quarters with two bunk beds in the bow, two forward cabins, each with a double berth, a U-shaped settee and a straight settee in the main salon and two aft cabins each with a double berth. The galley is located on the starboard side of the main salon. The galley is of straight configuration and is equipped with a four-burner stove, a refrigerator, freezer and a double sink. A navigation station is opposite the galley, on the port side. There are five heads, one for each cabin.

The design has a hull speed of 9.03 kn (16.72 km/h) and a PHRF handicap of 57 to 90.
