= International 50 =

Sailboat class

Development
- Designer: Bruce Farr
- Location: France
- Year: 1994
- Builder: Jeanneau
- Role: Cruiser

Boat
- Displacement: 33,000 lb (14,969 kg)
- Draft: 6.00 ft (1.83 m)

Hull
- Type: monohull
- Construction: fiberglass
- LOA: 49.75 ft (15.16 m)
- LWL: 42.33 ft (12.90 m)
- Beam: 15.92 ft (4.85 m)
- Engine: Perkins Engines 85 hp (63 kW) diesel engine

Hull appendages
- Keel: wing keel
- Rudder: spade-type rudder

Rig
- Rig type: Bermuda rig

Sails
- Sailplan: masthead sloop
- Total sail area: 1,205.00 sq ft (111.948 m^{2})

The International 50 is a French sailboat that was designed by Bruce Farr as a cruiser for Moorings Yacht Charter for use as a crewed yacht charter boat. It was first built in 1994. The boats are no longer in service with Moorings and many are now in private use instead.

The boat is derived from the Farr-designed 1989 Sun Odyssey 51, with a new keel and re-designed interior to accommodate six passengers and two crew members.

== Production ==
The design was built by Jeanneau in France, starting in 1994, but it is now out of production.

== Design ==
The International 50 is a recreational keelboat, built predominantly of fiberglass, with wood trim. It has a masthead sloop rig, a raked stem, a reverse transom, an internally mounted spade-type rudder controlled by a wheel and a fixed wing keel. It displaces 33,000 lb (14,969 kg).

The boat has a draft of 6.00 ft (1.83 m) with the standard wing keel.

The boat is fitted with a British Perkins Engines diesel engine of 85 hp (63 kW) for docking and maneuvering.

The design has sleeping accommodation for eight people, in four cabins. There are two bow cabins and two aft cabins, each with a double berth. The main salon has a U-shaped settee around a recgtangular table. The galley is located on the starboard side, amidships. The galley is U-shaped and is equipped with a three-burner stove, an ice box and a sink. A navigation station is forward of the galley, on the starboard side. There are four heads, one in each cabin.

The design has a hull speed of 8.72 kn (16.15 km/h).

The boat was specifically designed to be able to be converted for private ownership use when sold off from its charter role. These built in provisions include a nonstructural bulkhead between the two bow cabins that can be easily removed to allow it to be converted into a single, larger owner's cabin and the ability to convert the crew's aft cabin into a workshop or office.

== Operational history ==
In a 1995 Cruising World review, Quentin Warren wrote, "a thoroughly enjoyable outing in 25 to 30 knots of squally Gulf Stream weather last March off the coast of Florida convinced us of the 50's very capable behavior under sail, both structurally and in the performance realm. A subsequent seven-day passage from Fort Lauderdale to Tortola by a Moorings delivery crew points to its positive blue-water agility. In short, the International 50 is a nicely thought-out sailboat put together by a solid builder and capable of providing a lot of versatility to the right kind of buyer."

== See also ==
- List of sailing boat types
