= Sun Odyssey 51 =

Sailboat class

Development
- Designer: Bruce Farr; J&J Design
- Location: France
- Year: 1989
- Builder: Jeanneau
- Role: Cruiser

Boat
- Displacement: 30,860 lb (13,998 kg)
- Draft: 6.00 ft (1.83 m)

Hull
- Type: monohull
- Construction: fiberglass
- LOA: 50.83 ft (15.49 m)
- LWL: 42.33 ft (12.90 m)
- Beam: 16.00 ft (4.88 m)
- Engine: Perkins Engines 80 hp (60 kW) diesel engine

Hull appendages
- Keel: wing keel
- Ballast: 9,920 lb (4,500 kg)
- Rudder: spade-type rudder

Rig
- Rig type: Bermuda rig
- I foretriangle height: 62.00 ft (18.90 m)
- J foretriangle base: 17.91 ft (5.46 m)
- P mainsail luff: 54.85 ft (16.72 m)
- E mainsail foot: 18.70 ft (5.70 m)

Sails
- Sailplan: cutter rigged sloop
- Mainsail area: 512.85 sq ft (47.645 m^{2})
- Jib/genoa area: 555.21 sq ft (51.581 m^{2})
- Gennaker area: 1,600 sq ft (150 m^{2})
- Total sail area: 1,068.06 sq ft (99.226 m^{2})

Racing
- PHRF: 51

The Sun Odyssey 51 is a French sailboat that was designed by Bruce Farr and J&J Design as a cruiser and first built in 1989.

After introduction the boat underwent some style changes prescribed by Andrew Winch, including an interior redesign.

Also known as the Stardust 525, the design was developed into the International 50 in 1994 and the Sun Odyssey 52.2 in 1995.

== Production ==
The design was built by Jeanneau in France, from 1989 until 1992, but it is now out of production. Fifty boats were sold in the first six months of production.

== Design ==
The Sun Odyssey 51 is a recreational keelboat, built predominantly of fiberglass, with wood trim and a cutter rig. The hull has a raked stem plumb stem, a sharply reverse transom, an internally mounted spade-type rudder controlled by dual wheels and a fixed wing keel. It displaces 30,860 lb (13,998 kg) and carries 9,920 lb (4,500 kg) of cast iron ballast.

The boat has a draft of 6.00 ft (1.83 m) with the standard wing keel.

The boat is fitted with a British Perkins Engines diesel engine of 80 hp (60 kW)or a Japanese Yanmar diesel engine of 72 hp (54 kW)for docking and maneuvering. The fuel tank holds 100 U.S. gallons (380 L; 83 imp gal) and the fresh water tank has a capacity of 251 U.S. gallons (950 L; 209 imp gal).

The design has sleeping accommodation for six people, with a double "V"-berth in the bow cabin, a U-shaped settee in the main cabin and two aft cabins, each with a double berth. The U-shaped galley is located on the port side amidships. A navigation station is aft of the galley, on the port side. There are three heads, one just aft of the bow cabin on the port side and two just forward of the aft cabins. Cabin headroom is 78 in (198 cm). The cockpit also has a table that includes a hidden ice box.

For sailing downwind the design may be equipped with an asymmetrical spinnaker of 1,600 sq ft (150 m^{2}).

The design has a hull speed of 8.72 kn (16.15 km/h) and a PHRF handicap of 51 for the shoal draft keel mode.

== Operational history ==
The boat has been used in the yacht charter role, in a four-cabin configuration, with two cabins aft and two in the bow.

== See also ==
- List of sailing boat types
