= 10R =

10R may refer to:

- 10R, one of the standard photographic print sizes
- Beneteau First 10R, a French sailboat design
- Kawasaki Ninja ZX-10R, a Kawasaki sport motorcycle
- iPhone XR, with the Roman numeral X.
