= Beneteau 62 =

French sailboat class

Development
- Designer: Bruce Farr
- Location: France
- Year: 1995
- Builder: Beneteau
- Role: Cruiser

Boat
- Displacement: 55,115 lb (25,000 kg)
- Draft: 7.00 ft (2.13 m)

Hull
- Type: monohull
- Construction: glassfibre
- LOA: 62.17 ft (18.95 m)
- LWL: 51.17 ft (15.60 m)
- Beam: 17.08 ft (5.21 m)
- Engine: Perkins Engines or Yanmar diesel engine

Hull appendages
- Keel: Fin keel with weighted bulb
- Ballast: 17,313 lb (7,853 kg)
- Rudder: Spade-type rudder

Rig
- Rig type: Bermuda rig

Sails
- Sailplan: Masthead sloop
- Total sail area: 2,250 sq ft (209 m^{2})

The Beneteau 62 is a French sailboat that was designed by Bruce Farr as a cruiser and first built in 1995.

== Production ==
The design was built by Beneteau in France on a custom basis, starting in 1995, but it is now out of production.

== Design ==
The Beneteau 62 is a recreational keelboat, built predominantly of glassfibre, with wood trim. It has a masthead sloop rig, with three sets of swept spreaders. The hull has a raked stem, a reverse transom with a fold-up tailgate swimming platform, an internally mounted spade-type rudder controlled by a wheel and a fixed fin keel with a weighted bulb. It displaces 55,115 lb (25,000 kg) and carries 17,313 lb (7,853 kg) of ballast.

The boat has a draft of 7.00 ft (2.13 m) with the standard keel.

The boat is fitted with a British Perkins Engines or a Japanese Yanmar diesel engine for docking and manoeuvring. The fuel tank holds 160 U.S. gallons (610 L; 130 imp gal) and the fresh water tank has a capacity of 318 U.S. gallons (1,200 L; 265 imp gal).

Interiors were custom-built, but typical was a design with sleeping accommodation for eight people in four cabins. In this interior arrangement there are two forward cabins, each with a double berth and a head for each in the forepeak. There is elliptical settee, and five individual seats in the main salon, an amidships crew cabin to starboard, with two bunk beds and an aft owner's cabin with a central double island berth. The galley is located on the port side just aft of the companionway ladder. The galley is U-shaped and is equipped with a three-burner stove, a refrigerator, freezer and a double sink. A navigation station is in the main salon, on the starboard side. There are heads provided for each cabin.

The design has a hull speed of 9.59 kn (17.76 km/h).

== See also ==
- List of sailing boat types
