= Beneteau 44 CC =

1990s French recreational keelboat

Development
- Designer: Bruce Farr; Armel Briand
- Location: France
- Year: 1993
- No. built: about 150
- Builder: Beneteau
- Role: Cruiser
- Name: Beneteau 44 CC

Boat
- Displacement: 23,369 lb (10,600 kg)
- Draft: 5.75 ft (1.75 m)

Hull
- Type: monohull
- Construction: glassfibre
- LOA: 44.58 ft (13.59 m)
- LWL: 36.75 ft (11.20 m)
- Beam: 14.00 ft (4.27 m)
- Engine: Volvo or Yanmar 60 to 85 hp (45 to 63 kW) diesel engine

Hull appendages
- Keel: Fin keel with weighted bulb
- Ballast: 6,835 lb (3,100 kg)
- Rudder: Spade-type rudder

Rig
- Rig type: Bermuda rig
- I foretriangle height: 46.13 ft (14.06 m)
- J foretriangle base: 17.55 ft (5.35 m)
- P mainsail luff: 42.39 ft (12.92 m)
- E mainsail foot: 16.31 ft (4.97 m)

Sails
- Sailplan: Masthead sloop
- Mainsail area: 452 sq ft (42.0 m^{2})
- Jib/genoa area: 646 sq ft (60.0 m^{2})
- Spinnaker area: 1,184 sq ft (110.0 m^{2})
- Upwind sail area: 1,098 sq ft (102.0 m^{2})
- Downwind sail area: 1,636 sq ft (152.0 m^{2})

Racing
- PHRF: 126

The Beneteau 44 CC (Centre Cockpit) is a recreational keelboat built by Beneteau in France, from 1993 to 2002, with about 150 boats built.

It is a centre cockpit version the Beneteau 440 designed by Bruce Farr. The hull is predominantly hand-laid glassfibre. It uses vinylester resin for the outer skin and polyester resin for the interior. The hull has a raked stem, a reverse transom with steps to a swimming platform, an internally mounted spade-type rudder controlled by a wheel.

The design has sleeping accommodation for four to six people, with two and three cabin interior layouts. The two cabin interior is typical and has a double island berth in the bow cabin, a U-shaped settee and two additional seats in the main salon and an aft cabin with a central double island berth. The galley is located on the starboard side just aft of the companionway ladder. The galley is of straight configuration and is equipped with a three-burner stove, a refrigerator, freezer and a double sink. A navigation station is forward of the galley, on the starboard side. There are two heads, one in the bow cabin on the starboard side and one on the port side in the aft cabin. Cabin maximum headroom is 77 in (196 cm).

It has a masthead sloop rig, with a keel-stepped mast, two sets of 18° swept spreaders and aluminium spars with discontinuous stainless steel wire standing rigging. Mainsail in-mast furling was factory standard. For sailing downwind the design may be equipped with a symmetrical spinnaker of 1,184 sq ft (110.0 m^{2}).
