= Laser 28 =

1980s Canadian recreational keelboat

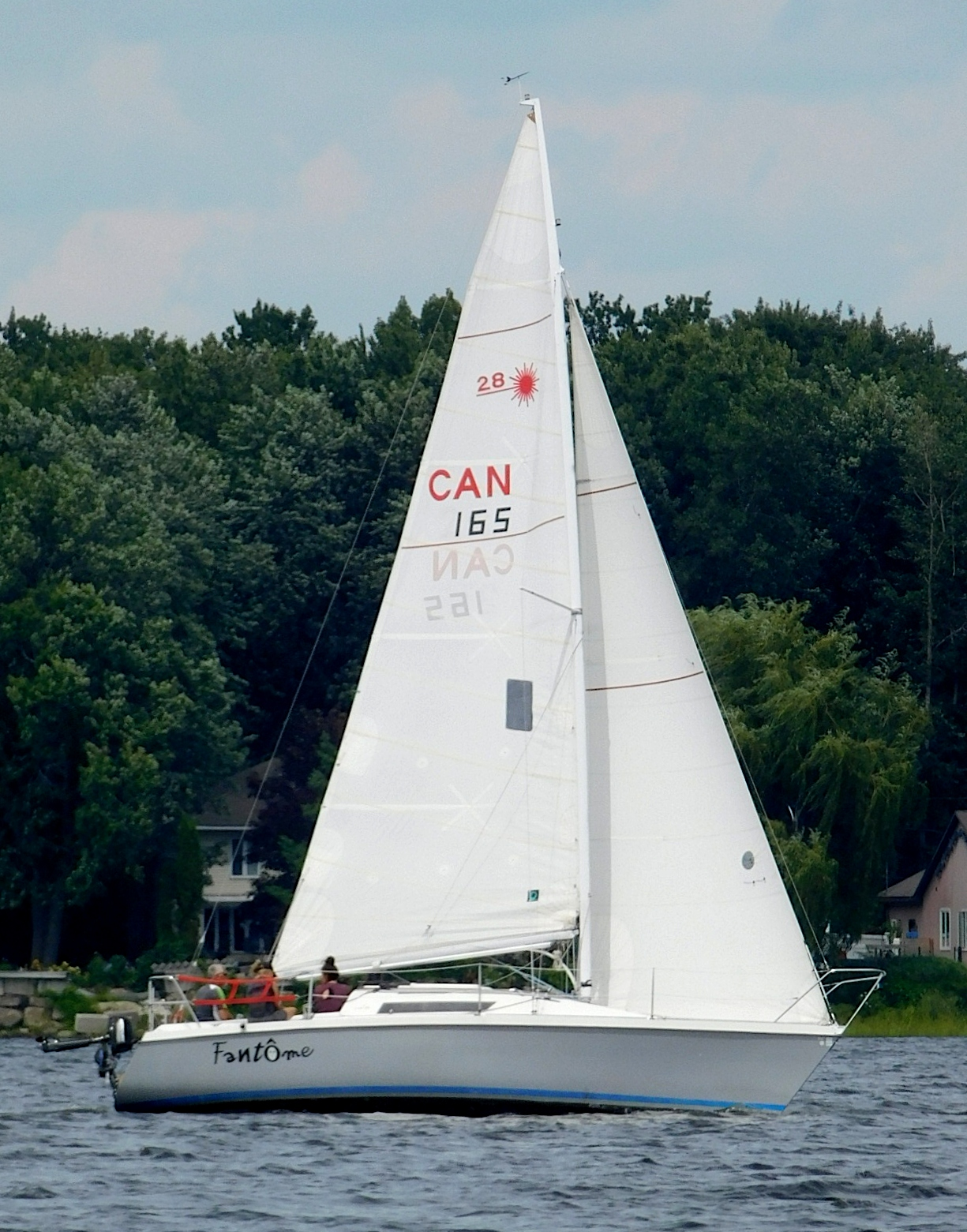

Development
- Designer: Bruce Farr
- Location: Canada
- Year: 1984
- Builder: Performance Sailcraft
- Name: Laser 28

Boat
- Displacement: 3,950 lb (1,792 kg)
- Draft: 4.98 ft (1.52 m)

Hull
- Type: Monohull
- Construction: Fibreglass, with a Termanto PVC foam hull and deck
- LOA: 28.41 ft (8.66 m)
- LWL: 23.58 ft (7.19 m)
- Beam: 9.48 ft (2.89 m)
- Engine: Bukh 8SME 8.2 hp (6 kW) diesel engine

Hull appendages
- Keel: Fin keel
- Ballast: 1,500 lb (680 kg)
- Rudder: internally-mounted spade-type rudder

Rig
- General: Fractional rigged sloop
- I foretriangle height: 31.10 ft (9.48 m)
- J foretriangle base: 9.65 ft (2.94 m)
- P mainsail luff: 33.14 ft (10.10 m)
- E mainsail foot: 12.96 ft (3.95 m)

Sails
- Mainsail area: 214.75 sq ft (19.951 m^{2})
- Jib/genoa area: 150.06 sq ft (13.941 m^{2})
- Total sail area: 364.80 sq ft (33.891 m^{2})

Racing
- PHRF: 123 (average)

The Laser 28 is a recreational keelboat built by Performance Sailcraft in Canada from 1984 until 1990.

The design goal of the boat was to be a good value high quality advanced one-design, to be independent of any rule structure, such as the IOR.

== Development ==
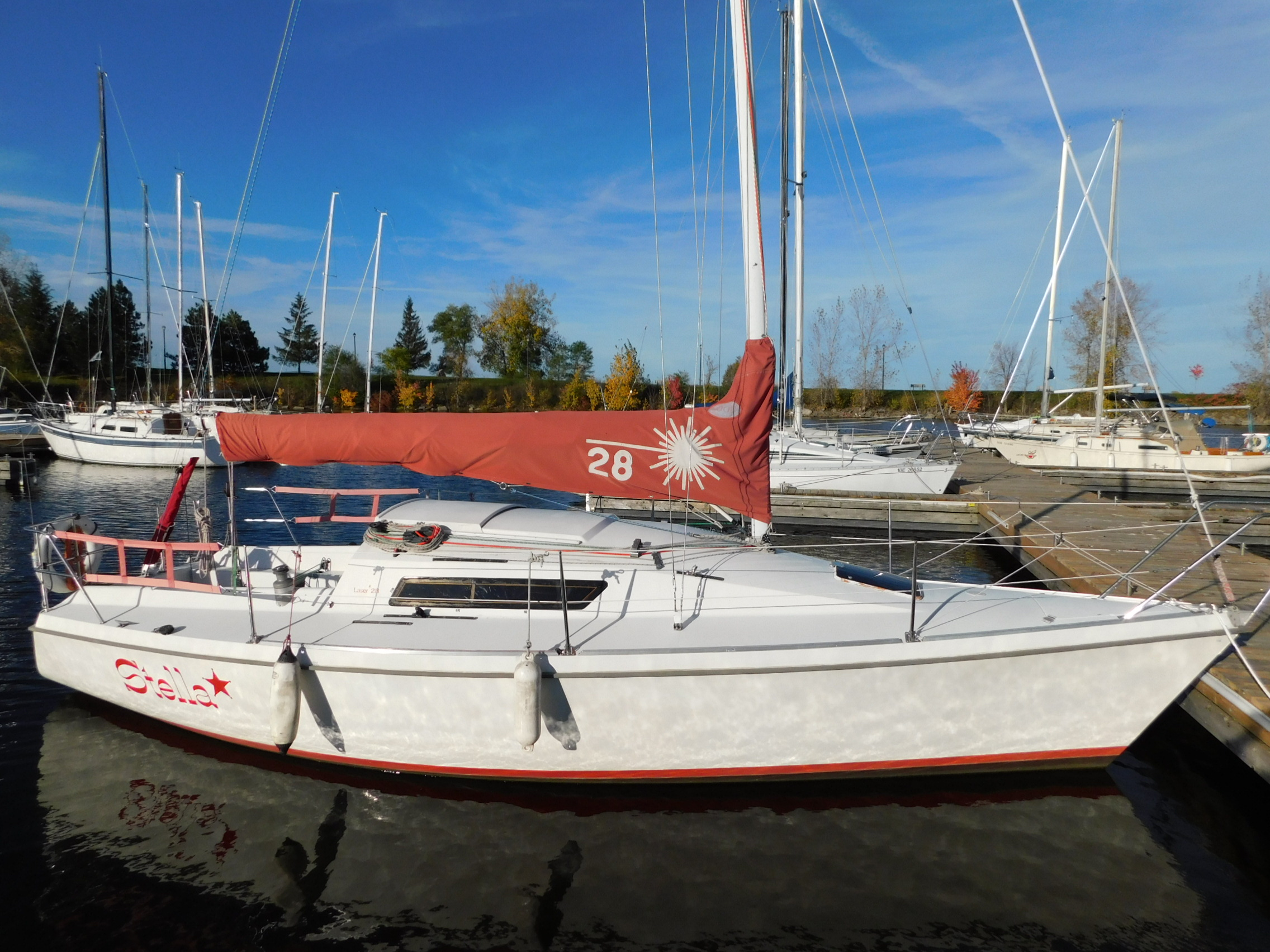
Laser 28

The Laser 28's design started in 1978, following the success of the Laser dinghy, with the intention to produce a keelboat equivalent, for the Laser sailors who would outgrow the Laser, just need a keelboat as they aged, or for family cruising and racing. The company specifically planned that the Laser 28 would be the sole keelboat offered and did not intend to produce a graduated line of boats, unlike other manufacturers at that time.

In 1980 Ian Bruce, president of Performance Sailcraft decided to take the boat design away from that company to reduce commercial pressures on the design team. He formed Bruce Yacht R&D Inc (BYRD) and teamed with designer Bruce Farr and a group headed up by the president of the International Laser Class Association, Tim Coventry.

The Laser 28 was Farr's 91st boat design. The project development team included Performance Sailcraft's Ian Bruce, Tim Coventry President of the International Laser Class Association, experienced sailor Peter Hicks, Norman Frost as plastics engineer and Piers Phipps as project financial advisor. Hans Fogh designed the sails, as he had done for the Laser dinghy.

The boat project had four design goals. First, that the boat should be a strict one-design in the same vein as the Laser dinghy, with all boats produced the same with class rules that prohibited any changes to the boat, so that the competition would be between sailing skills and not the ability to pay for improvements. Second, that the design should have outstanding performance, unhampered by adherence to any rule structure, such as the International Offshore Rule, to ensure a long life as a competitive boat. Third, that the boat be a quality product, using the best of available technology. Fourth, that the boat represent a good value for the monetary outlay, "the intention being to produce a 28 foot yacht with a performance of a 35 foot yacht at the price of a 25 foot yacht."

Two prototypes were built and the first sailed in the early summer of 1981 in Falmouth, England, with the second in the water that autumn. Originally fitted with a large genoa foresail the second prototype used a 108% "lapper" jib, that proved superior in winds over 5 kn (9 km/h) and was easier to handle by short-handed crews, as well as cheaper to produce.

The prototypes were tested in severe conditions, including broaching and intentional knockdowns with the spinnaker flying, in 35 to 40 kn (65 to 74 km/h) winds that left the cockpit dry and with no equipment failures.

With $1,000,000 invested, to get the design from testing to production, a new firm was created by financial consultant Piers Phipps, Precis Ninety Nine Limited. The design was licensed to Performance Sailcraft to produce.

Early versions were hand-laid, while later ones were produced using a closed-mold process.

== Design ==
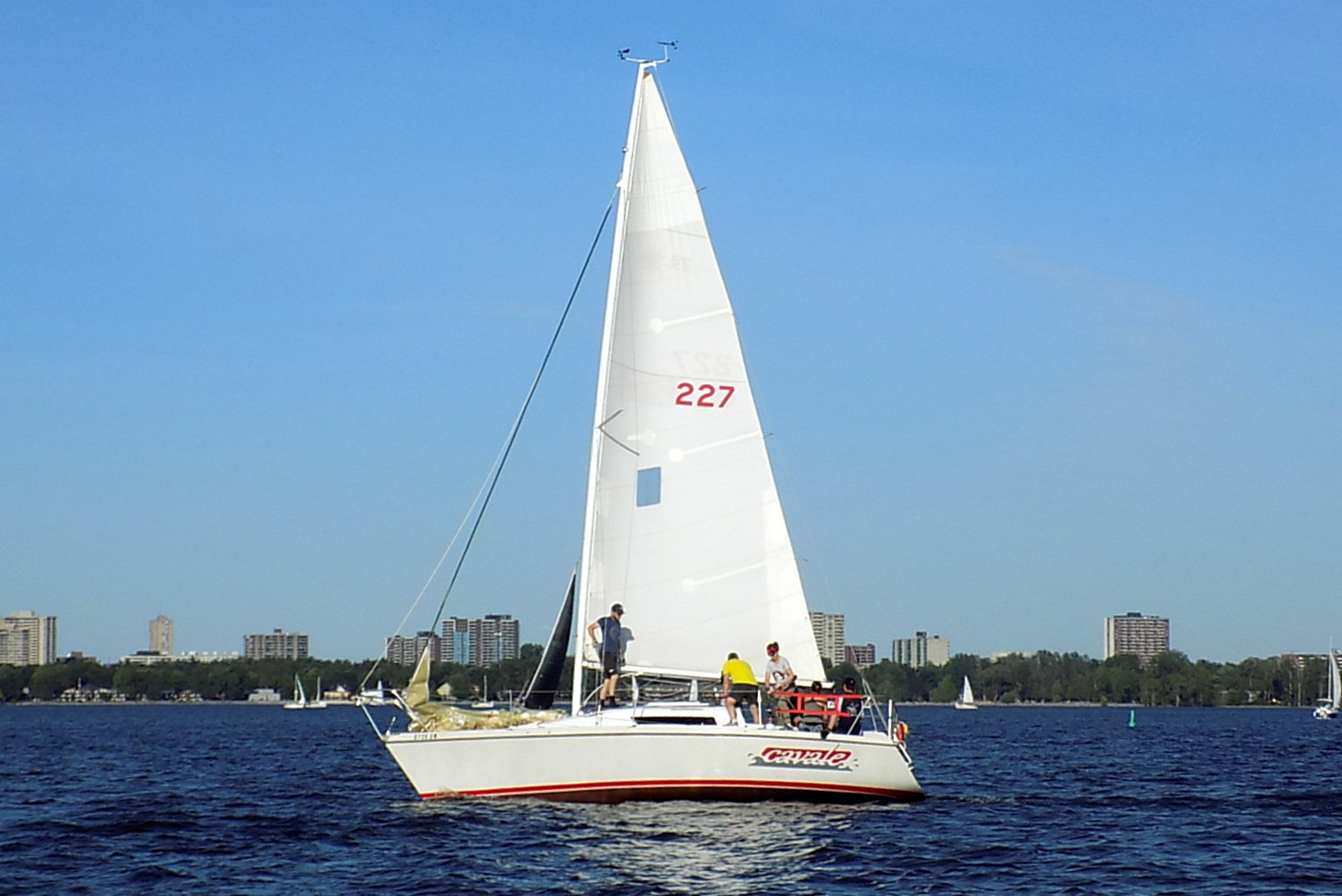
Laser 28

The Laser 28 is a small recreational keelboat, built predominantly of fibreglass, with a Termanto PVC foam hull and deck. It has an internally-mounted spade-type rudder and a fixed fin keel. It displaces 3,950 lb (1,792 kg) and carries 1,500 lb (680 kg) of lead ballast. The boat has a draft of 4.98 ft (1.52 m) with the standard fin keel.

The prototypes were fitted with Honda four-stroke gasoline engines, coupled to a Volvo saildrive, but there was resistance to using gasoline engines in Europe, due to the fire hazard. The production boats were therefore delivered with a Bukh 8SME diesel engine of 8.2 hp (6 kW).

It has a fractional sloop rig and a spinnaker. Production sails include 242 sq ft (22.5 m^{2}) mainsail, a 106% "lapper" jib of 162 sq ft (15.1 m^{2}), a working jib of 123 sq ft (11.4 m^{2}), a #1 spinnaker of 610 sq ft (57 m^{2}), a #2 spinnaker of 670 sq ft (62 m^{2}) and an optional genoa of 230 sq ft (21 m^{2}).

The boat has a hull speed of 6.51 kn (12.06 km/h) and a PHRF racing average handicap of 123 with a high of 117 and low of 132.

== Operational history ==
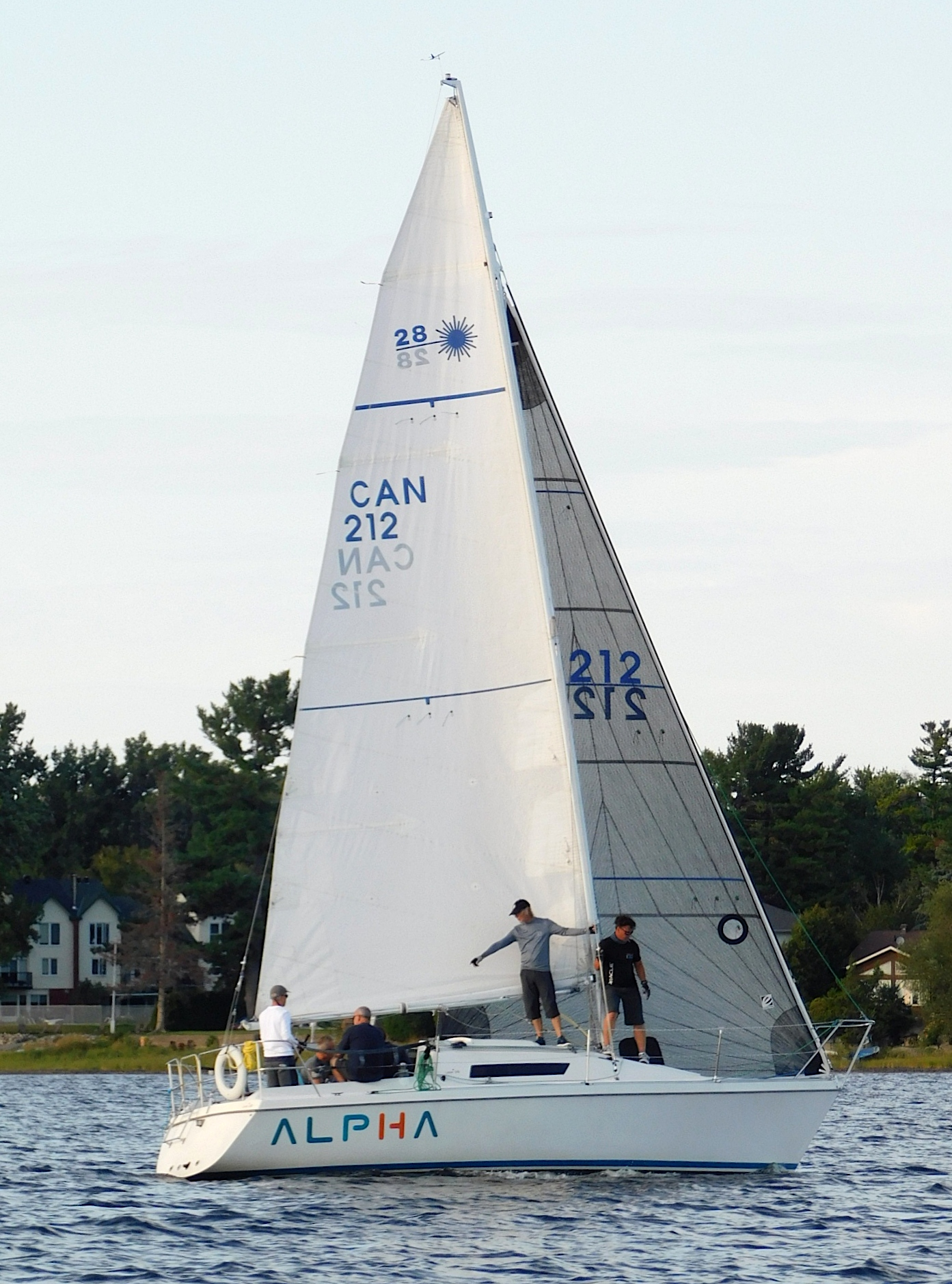
Laser 28

The Laser 28 was not sold though the existing Performance Sailcraft company dealer network, but rather through direct representatives who owned and sailed Laser 28s and organized events for them.

Robert Dunkley of Nassau, Bahamas, took delivery of his Laser 28 in Fort Lauderdale, Florida and sailed directly to Nassau with a crew of three, the same day. They sailed in 30 kn (56 km/h) north winds in the Gulf Stream and encountered 10 to 15 ft (3.0 to 4.6 m) waves en route, but completed the voyage without incident, although the rigging required tightening at destination.

Judy and Frank Button from Vancouver, British Columbia won the IYC winter series in their Laser 28, for the fourth time in a row.

The company's San Francisco Bay representative, Paul Kaplan, sailed his Laser 28 single handed on its fourth outing and won first place in the class and first overall in a 38 boat fleet in the Singlehanded Sailing Society’s Three Bridge Fiasco Race. Kaplan's wife, Chris, sailed the boat with an all-female crew to third place in the Women’s Racing Association winter series.
