= Farr 3.7 =

One-person sailing dinghy

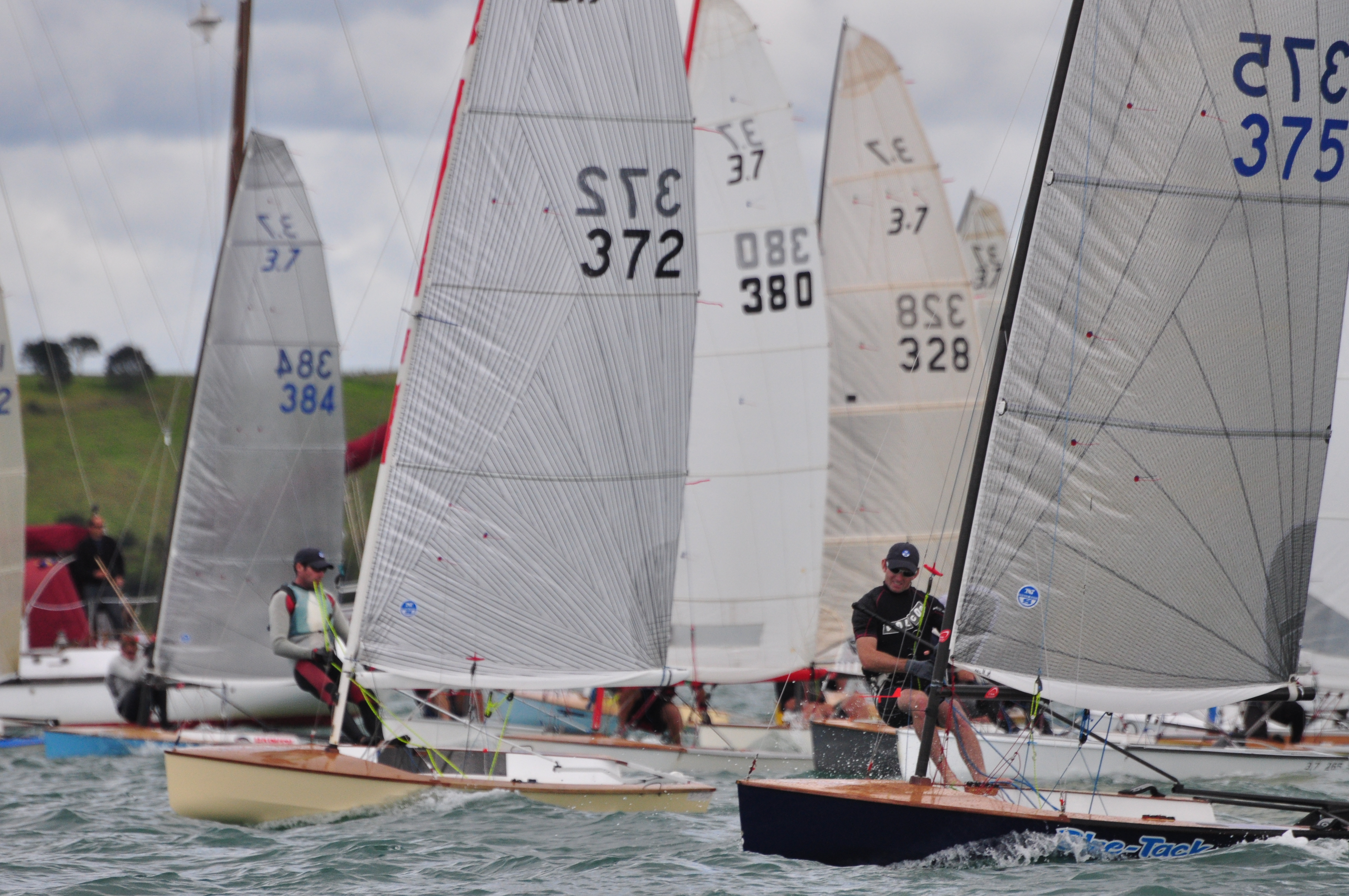
- 2009 Nationals

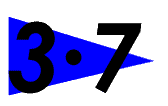

Development
- Designer: Bruce Farr
- Year: 1971
- Design: One-Design
- Name: Farr 3.7

Boat
- Crew: 1

Hull
- Type: Monohull
- Construction: Plywood or foam sandwich
- Hull weight: 50 kg
- LOA: 3.7 m (12 ft 2 in)
- Beam: 1.52 m (5 ft 0 in)

Sails
- Total sail area: 8.8 m^{2}

The Farr 3.7 is a one-person sailing dinghy (Single Handed Dinghy) designed by Bruce Farr in 1971. The design plans are sold by the 3.7 Class Owners Association and they are built by a mix of professionals and home built by amateurs. The 3.7 Class is recognised by Yachting New Zealand as a national class and yachts are sailed in New Zealand, Australia and Great Britain. Full sets of plans have been sold worldwide to a number of individuals with greatest numbers in Germany, Japan, USA, South Korea, Poland, France, Belgium, Russia, Spain, Uruguay.

== Design ==
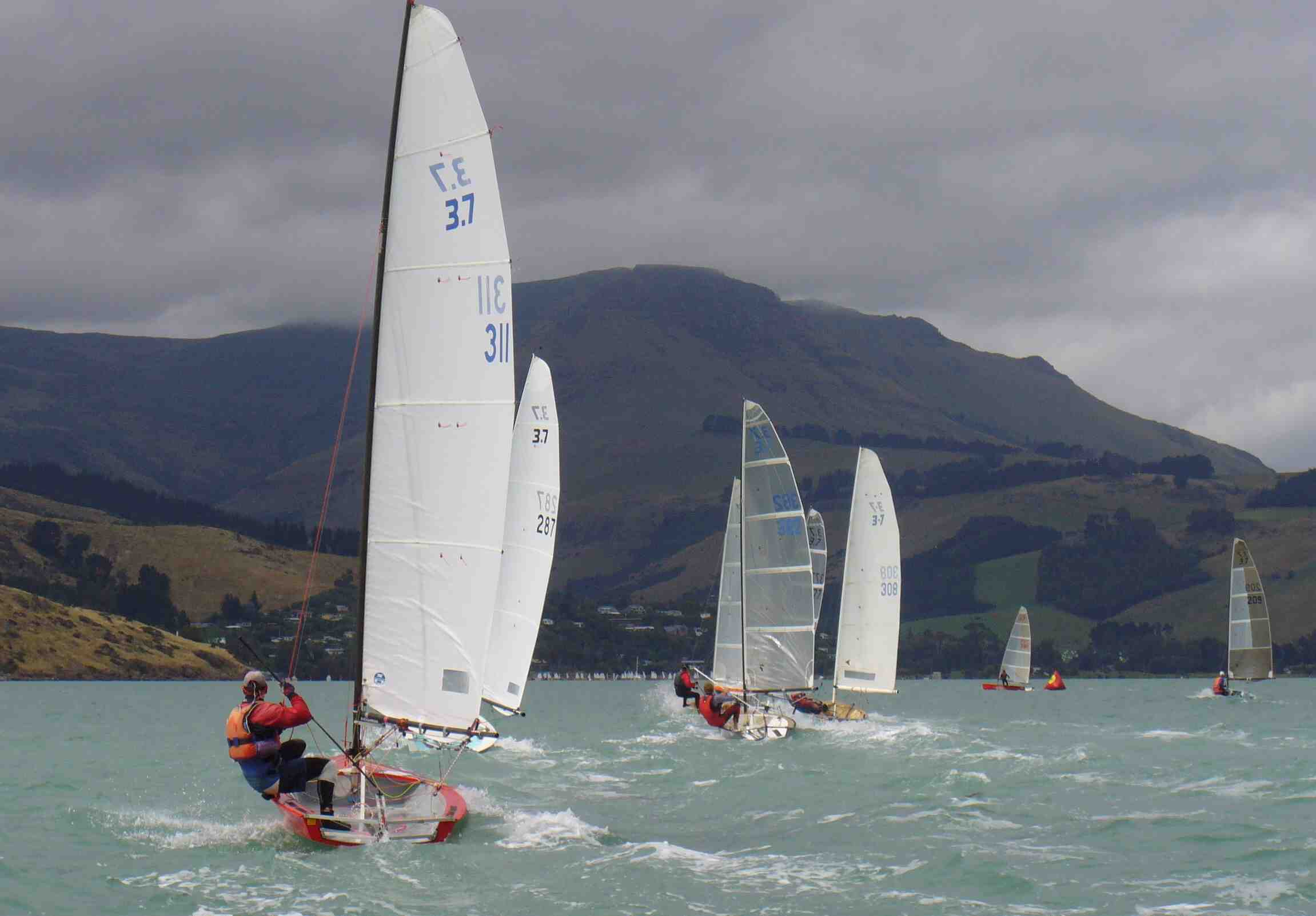
Farr 3.7 Nationals 2007

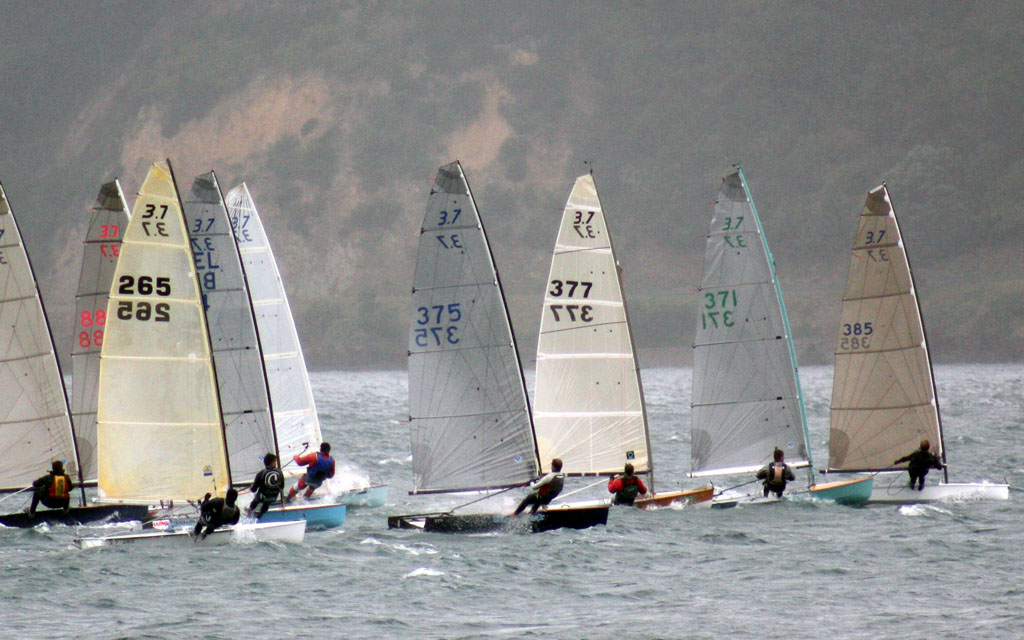
Farr 3.7 Nationals 2010

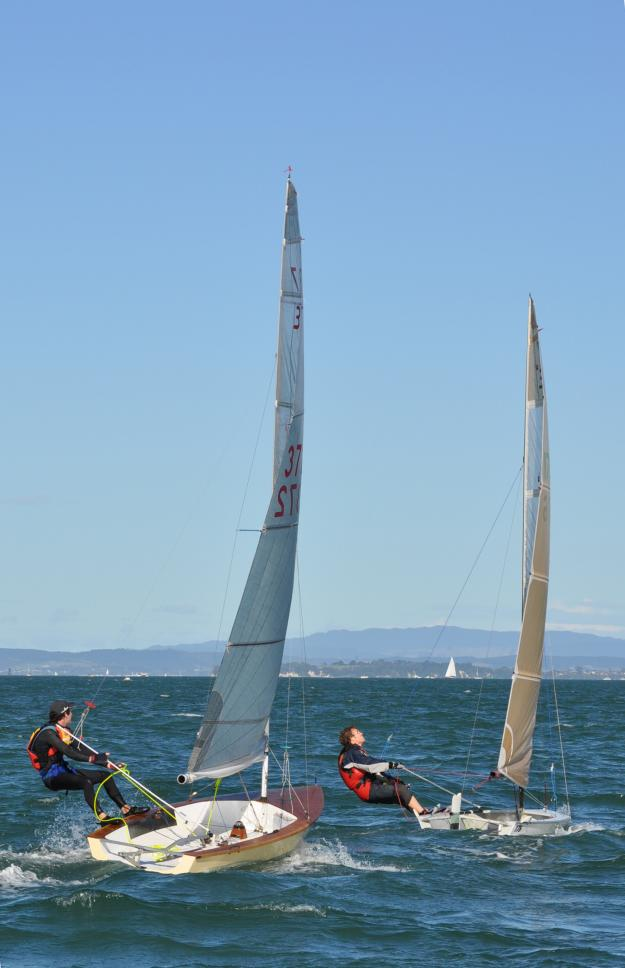
Farr 3.7 Takapuna

The 3.7 Class is sailed in two versions; the 3.7 Class and 3.7 Class Turbo version. The standard 3.7 Class is used for class racing. A turbo version provides option to additionally fit a prod and gennaker.

The 3.7 Class use a fully battened mainsail of approximately 8.8m^2 on a carbon mast. The sail plan is closely controlled by the class rules and the hull form is very closely controlled by the rules and measured on a jig. The mast, rigging, centreboard and rudder are only loosely controlled. Most hulls are made from plywood, but a number of sandwich composite hulls exist. To date no composite hull has ever won the New Zealand National Championship and plywood boats over 30 years old are routinely winning against brand new boats.

The 3.7 Class is usually raced with crews of 50 kg up to 90 kg. The most competitive sailors seem to be in the 60 kg to 80 kg region. Sailors range in age from 16 up to 67 years (and counting) with male and female categories as well as veteran, grand veteran and great grand veteran ages categories. The yachts carry corrector weights to bring them to 50 kg and they are a skiff design that aquaplanes both upwind and downwind except in very light conditions. The sailor trapezes from the side of the yacht while steering and trimming with each hand. The yachts are relatively small and can pitch pole end over end at high speed and are difficult to control in over 20 knots of wind. Youngsters training to sail larger skiffs often use the class as a training ground for several seasons while they are growing heavier, but most sailors are lighter weight individuals.

== Performance ==
The class has a register of boats in New Zealand, Australia and Great Britain. New Zealand has national champions recognised by Yachting New Zealand (formerly NZYF) dating back to 1974. These yachts will plane upwind and downwind in a breeze of 12 knots or more. In 8 knots they will plane easily on reaches but are sailed in a displacement mode upwind and downwind. In strong winds of 25 knots or more they are difficult to sail and extremely exciting, with numerous capsizes suiting summer venues with warm water. The yachts sail best upwind if they are allowed to point a little lower than the theoretical maximum and this gives much better boat speed so that the VMG (Velocity made good) is maximized.

== See also ==
- Dinghy sailing
- Dinghy racing
