= Beneteau 57 =

French sailboat class

Development
- Designer: Bruce Farr; Franck Darnet
- Location: France
- Year: 2002
- Builder: Beneteau
- Role: Cruiser
- Name: Beneteau 57

Boat
- Displacement: 48,623 lb (22,055 kg)
- Draft: 8.53 ft (2.60 m)

Hull
- Type: monohull
- Construction: glassfibre
- LOA: 58.40 ft (17.80 m)
- LWL: 49.25 ft (15.01 m)
- Beam: 16.17 ft (4.93 m)
- Engine: Yanmar 4JH4HTE 160 hp (119 kW) diesel engine

Hull appendages
- Keel: Fin keel with weighted bulb
- Ballast: 17,108 lb (7,760 kg)
- Rudder: Spade-type rudder

Rig
- Rig type: Bermuda rig

Sails
- Sailplan: Fractional rigged sloop
- Total sail area: 1,679.16 sq ft (155.999 m^{2})

Racing
- PHRF: 42-51

The Beneteau 57 is a French sailboat that was designed by Bruce Farr as a cruiser and first built in 2002. The interior design was created by Franck Darnet.

== Production ==
The design was built by Beneteau in France, starting in 2002, but it is now out of production.

== Design ==
The Beneteau 57 is a recreational keelboat, built predominantly of glassfibre, with wood trim. The hull is solid fibreglass and the deck is balsa-cored. It has a fractional sloop rig, with three sets of swept spreaders and aluminium spars with stainless steel wire standing rigging. The hull has a centre cockpit, a raked stem, an angled transom, an internally mounted spade-type rudder controlled by a wheel and a fixed fin keel with a weighted bulb or optional shoal draft keel. It displaces 48,623 lb (22,055 kg) and carries 17,108 lb (7,760 kg) of ballast. A bow thruster and a 9.5kVa generator are both standard equipment, while a hydraulic autopilot is optional.

The boat has a draft of 8.53 ft (2.60 m) with the standard keel and 6.89 ft (2.10 m) with the optional shoal draft keel.

The boat is fitted with a Japanese Yanmar 4JH4HTE diesel engine of 160 hp (119 kW) for docking and manoeuvring. The fuel tank holds 127 U.S. gallons (480 L; 106 imp gal) and the fresh water tank has a capacity of 264 U.S. gallons (1,000 L; 220 imp gal).

The design was built with a number of different interior layouts, with from two to five cabins, providing sleeping accommodation for four to ten people. The five cabin interior is typical, with two forward and two aft cabins, plus a starboard midship cabin, each with a double berth and a private head. The main salon has a U-shaped settee and a straight settee. The galley is located on the port side aft of the companionway ladder. The galley is L-shaped and is equipped with a four-burner stove, a refrigerator, freezer, dishwasher and a double sink. A navigation station is opposite the galley, on the starboard side.

For sailing downwind the design may be equipped with a tri-radial asymmetric spinnaker.

The design has a hull speed of 9.40 kn (17.41 km/h) and a PHRF handicap of 42 to 51.

== Operational history ==
In a 2004 Yacht and Boat review, Barry Tranter wrote, "the 57 has a waterline length of 15m and she is not slow. We saw 9.5 knots on a beam reach in 18 knots under full sail. The skipper has seen 10 in 20, and the crew claims 9 knots in 12 of wind under the tri-radial asymmetric spinnaker. "

In a 2004 review for Sailing Magazine, John Kretschmer wrote, "back on deck the wind had eased a bit to 11 knots true and, with a 145-percent roller-furling genoa, we punched through the chop at 8 knots plus on a beat. Easing the sheets, we shot up toward 9 knots, and when the wind freshened to 15 knots true, the speedo hit 9.2. The ride was easy and the motion soft. The steering was effortless. That, of course, is a feature of hydraulic steering. You drive by the sails, not the feedback from the rudder, and until you get used to it, it's easy to oversteer. Cracking off onto a deeper reach, we maintained 8 knots despite a falling apparent wind. Mind you, these boat speeds are obtained with a crowd of people on board and little attention to sail trim. I sure that with a little effort, the 57 will spend a lot of time clipping along in double digits."

== See also ==
- List of sailing boat types
