= Joseph Vittoria =

American businessman (1935–2021)

Joseph V. Vittoria (1935-2021) was the Chairman and CEO of Avis.

== Early life and career ==
Vittoria was born in Long Island, New York in 1935. He graduated from Yale University with a BS in civil engineering and from Columbia Business School with an MBA. Vittoria served as the Chairman and CEO of Avis from 1987 to 1997. During his tenure, he managed the acquisition of Avis by HFS Incorporated, helping to transition the employee owned company to a subsidiary. Prior to that, Vittoria served as the President and COO of Avis from 1982 to 1987.

Vittoria served on the Leadership Council for Concordia, a nonpartisan nonprofit organization based in New York City that is focused on promoting effective public-private collaboration to create a more prosperous and sustainable future.

== Personal life ==
After his career in the car rental business, Vittoria operated a fleet of very large sailing boats that were all the largest sloops in the world at the time of their launch. His fleet included two 40m Mirabellas, and he also commissioned Mirabella V, the largest single-mast sailing yacht to date.
