= Sun Odyssey 52.2 =

Sailboat class

Development
- Designer: Bruce Farr
- Location: France
- Year: 1995
- Builder: Jeanneau
- Role: Cruiser
- Name: Sun Odyssey 52.2

Boat
- Displacement: 33,070 lb (15,000 kg)
- Draft: 5.90 ft (1.80 m)

Hull
- Type: monohull
- Construction: fiberglass
- LOA: 50.50 ft (15.39 m)
- LWL: 41.67 ft (12.70 m)
- Beam: 15.91 ft (4.85 m)
- Engine: Yanmar 74 hp (55 kW) diesel engine

Hull appendages
- Keel: fin keel with weighted bulb
- Ballast: 12,346 lb (5,600 kg)
- Rudder: spade-type rudder

Rig
- Rig type: Bermuda rig
- I foretriangle height: 58.73 ft (17.90 m)
- J foretriangle base: 19.03 ft (5.80 m)
- P mainsail luff: 51.18 ft (15.60 m)
- E mainsail foot: 17.72 ft (5.40 m)

Sails
- Sailplan: masthead sloop
- Mainsail area: 453.45 sq ft (42.127 m^{2})
- Jib/genoa area: 558.82 sq ft (51.916 m^{2})
- Total sail area: 1,012.27 sq ft (94.043 m^{2})

Racing
- PHRF: 68-108

The Sun Odyssey 52.2, also called the Jeanneau 52.2, is a French sailboat that was designed by Bruce Farr as a cruiser and first built in 1995.

For the yacht charter market the design was sold as the Moorings 52.2 and the Stardust 535.

== Production ==
The design was built by Jeanneau in France, starting in 1995, but it is now out of production. The shallow fin keel model was discontinued at the end of 1999.

== Design ==
The Sun Odyssey 52.2 is a recreational keelboat, built predominantly of fiberglass, with wood trim. It has a masthead sloop rig, a raked stem, a reverse transom with steps down to swimming platform, an internally mounted spade-type rudder controlled by dual wheels and a fixed deep draft fin keel, shallow draft keel with a weighted bulb or a performance keel. The deep draft fin keel model displaces 31,967 lb (14,500 kg) and carries 11,133 lb (5,050 kg) of ballast, the shallow draft version displaces 33,070 lb (15,000 kg) and carries 12,346 lb (5,600 kg) of ballast, the performance keel version displaces 30,755 lb (13,950 kg) and carries 9,921 lb (4,500 kg) of ballast.

The boat has a draft of 6.56 ft (2.00 m) with the deep draft fin keel, 5.90 ft (1.80 m) with the shallow draft keel and 7.55 ft (2.30 m) with the performance keel.

The boat is fitted with a Japanese Yanmar diesel engine of 74 hp (55 kW) for docking and maneuvering. The fuel tank holds 106 U.S. gallons (400 L; 88 imp gal) and the fresh water tank has a capacity of 227 U.S. gallons (860 L; 189 imp gal).

The design has sleeping accommodation for six or eight people in three cabin and four cabin interior arrangements. The three cabin version has an owner's cabin in the bow with a large double berth and two aft cabins. The four cabin version divides the bow cabin into two cabins, with a nonstructural folding bulkhead. The main salon has a U-shaped settee and a straight settee, around a table. The galley is located on the starboard side, amidships. The galley is U-shaped and is equipped with a three-burner stove, an ice box and a double sink. A navigation station is aft of the galley, on the starboard side. In the three cabin version there are three heads, one in each cabin, with the forward one with a separate shower compartment. The four cabin version adds an extra bow head. For use as a yacht charter boat the forepeak locker can be used as crew quarters.

The design has a hull speed of 8.65 kn (16.02 km/h) and a PHRF handicap of 69 to 108.

== See also ==
- List of sailing boat types
