= Beneteau 34.7 =

Sailboat class

Development
- Designer: Bruce Farr
- Location: France
- Year: 2005
- No. built: 125
- Builder: Beneteau
- Role: Cruiser-Racer
- Name: Beneteau 34.7

Boat
- Displacement: 9,965 lb (4,520 kg)
- Draft: 6.58 ft (2.01 m)

Hull
- Type: monohull
- Construction: glassfibre
- LOA: 32.75 ft (9.98 m)
- LWL: 28.67 ft (8.74 m)
- Beam: 11.08 ft (3.38 m)
- Engine: Yanmar 21 hp (16 kW) diesel engine

Hull appendages
- Keel: Fin keel with weighted bulb
- Ballast: 3,682 lb (1,670 kg)
- Rudder: Spade-type rudder

Rig
- Rig type: Bermuda rig
- I foretriangle height: 43.25 ft (13.18 m)
- J foretriangle base: 12.08 ft (3.68 m)
- P mainsail luff: 42.00 ft (12.80 m)
- E mainsail foot: 14.90 ft (4.54 m)

Sails
- Sailplan: Fractional rigged sloop
- Mainsail area: 380 sq ft (35 m^{2})
- Jib/genoa area: 377 sq ft (35.0 m^{2})
- Upwind sail area: 757 sq ft (70.3 m^{2})

The Beneteau 34.7, also sold as the First 34.7 and the First 10R, is a French sailboat that was designed by Bruce Farr as a cruiser-racer, optimized for International Rating Certificate racing and first built in 2005.

== Production ==
The design was built by Beneteau at their US plant in Marion, South Carolina, starting in 2005, as a 2006 model year. Production ended in 2009, with 125 boats completed.

== Design ==
The Beneteau 34.7 is a recreational keelboat, built predominantly of glassfibre, with wood trim. The hull is solid fibreglass below the waterline; above the waterline the hull and the deck are balsa-cored. It has a fractional sloop rig, with a keel-stepped mast, two sets of swept spreaders and composite, or optional carbon fibre, spars with steel rod standing rigging. It has a retractable carbon fibre bowsprit. The hull has a slightly raked stem, an open reverse transom, an internally mounted spade-type rudder controlled by a large 63 in (160 cm) diameter wheel and a fixed iron fin keel with a weighted "torpedo" bulb, or optional shoal-draft keel. A larger rudder was a factory option. The boat displaces 9,965 lb (4,520 kg) empty and carries 3,682 lb (1,670 kg) of lead ballast.

The boat has a draft of 6 ft 7 in (2.01 m) with the standard keel and 5 ft 5 in (1.65 m) with the optional shoal draft keel.

The boat is fitted with a Japanese Yanmar diesel engine of 21 hp (16 kW) for docking and manoeuvring. The fuel tank holds 19.2 U.S. gallons (73 L; 16.0 imp gal) and the fresh water tank has a capacity of 26.4 U.S. gallons (100 L; 22.0 imp gal).

The design has sleeping accommodation for three people in two cabins. It has a double berth in the starboard aft cabin and a single in the port aft cabin. There are two straight settees in the main salon around a drop-leaf table. The galley is located on the port side, just forward of the companionway ladder. The galley is L-shaped and is equipped with a two-burner stove, an icebox and a sink. A navigation station is opposite the galley, on the starboard side. The head is located in the forepeak. Cabin headroom is 71 in (180 cm).

For sailing downwind the design may be equipped with an asymmetrical spinnaker flown from the retractable bowsprit.

The design has a hull speed of 7.17 kn (13.28 km/h).

== Operational history ==
In a 2007 review of the First 10R for Sailing World, Tony Bessinger wrote, "we test-sailed the First 10R in a breeze that stayed between 6 and 10 knots for the duration of our sail. With the 150-percent overlapping genoa, the 10R powered up quickly as the wind hit its top end for the day. Upwind, we recorded between 5.8 to 6.5 knots on the handheld Garmin Gecko GPS. Sailing downwind with the asymmetric, we reached a high of 7 knots."

In a 2021 Yachting World review of the Beneteau First 34.7, Matthew Sheahan wrote, "under way she has a solid, dependable, chunky feel to her helm. Lock to lock is just over half a turn, which on most boats would produce a twitchy feel, but not aboard the Beneteau First 34.7. In fact, it took me some time before I realised."

== See also ==
- List of sailing boat types
