= Mirabella V =

Yacht built in 2003

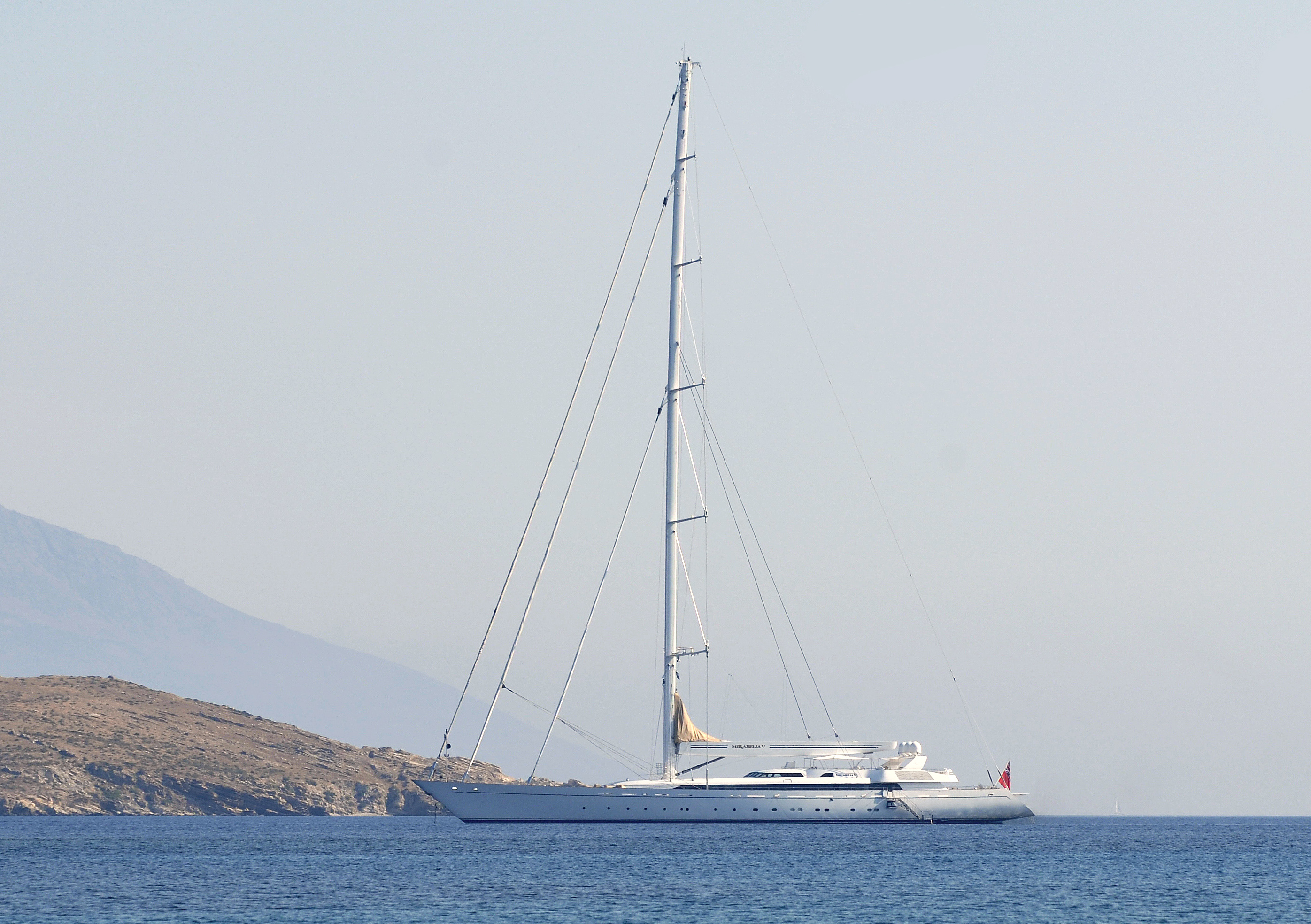
- Mirabella V at Rineia, Cyclades in 2008

History

Isle of Man
- Name: Mirabella V (rechristened M5)
- Namesake: Mirabella I, Mirabella II, Mirabella III
- Port of registry: Isle of Man
- Builder: VT Shipbuilding, Woolston, Hampshire
- Yard number: 4322
- Launched: 27 November 2003
- Completed: May 2004
- Refit: 2025
- Identification: IMO number: 8979374; MMSI number: 235007140; Callsign: MDJS3
- Notes: Largest single-masted yacht ever built

General characteristics
- Type: Flybridge sloop
- Tonnage: 1,017 GT (2013)
- Displacement: 765 tonnes (half-load) (2013)
- Length: 77.60 m (254.6 ft) (2013)
- Beam: 14.82 m (48.6 ft)
- Height: 88.5 m (290 ft)
- Draught: 10.20 m (33.5 ft) maximum (2013)
- Propulsion: 2 × Caterpillar 969 kW (1,299 hp) (2013)
- Sail plan: Triple-headed sloop
- Crew: 17
- Aircraft carried: Float-mounted Carbon Cub

M5 is a sloop-rigged super yacht launched in 2003 as Mirabella V. She is the largest single-masted yacht ever built.

== Ownership ==
Mirabella V was built as part of a fleet of large sailing yachts used for luxury private charters by Joseph Vittoria, former chairman and CEO of the Avis car rental company. (Note: Vittoria grew up on Long Island and worked as a "launch boy" at a yacht club in Sea Cliff, New York, where he developed a love for sailing. Two of his sisters married sailors who helped him learn and continue his enjoyment of sailing. Vittoria lived in Greenwich, Connecticut from 1980 to 1991 and still has a home and membership in the Belle Haven Club, there, although he and his wife, Luciana, later moved to Palm Beach, Florida. Vittoria made his fortune helping organise the buyout and resale of Avis in the 1980s.) She was named after Vittoria's previous yachts.

Mirabella V now belongs to Rodney Lewis and has been renamed M5. It is no longer available for charters.

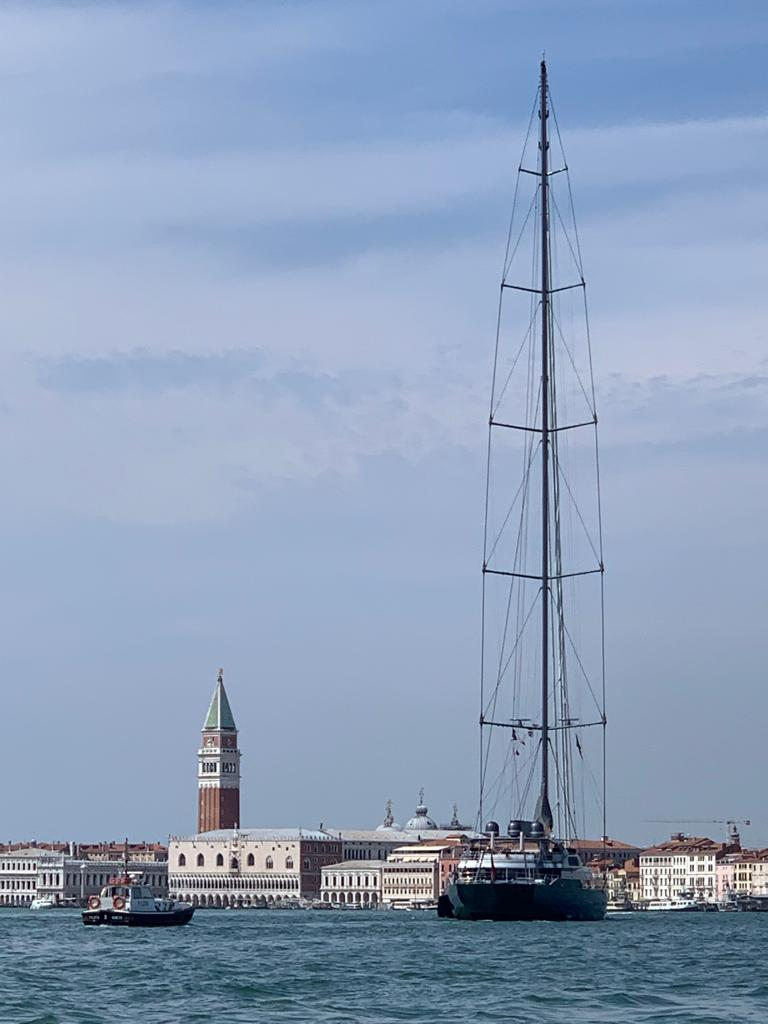
M5 in Venice, Italy August 2020

== Design ==
The owner specifications combined fast sailing with motoryacht amenities. M5 has achieved speeds in excess of 19 knots (35 km/h; 22 mph) in 8 1/2 ft seas. To achieve the amenity requirements, a single mast was preferred to other rig types in order to maximize interior volumes in keel-stepped sailing yachts; To achieve the performance requirements, the higher aspect ratio of the single mast sail plan was also preferred in order to provide a better speed potential. A final demand was that the yacht be able to use the harbour at Palm Beach, Florida. This required the use of a lifting keel to reduce draft.

Mirabella V was designed by yacht designer Ron Holland. Load and structural calculations of the hull and rig were carried out by Hamble-based firm High Modulus Europe Ltd, (now part of Gurit).

== Technical challenges ==
While vessels of M5's size are typically made from steel or aluminium, an aramid foam core/vinylester sandwich build was chosen to achieve a shorter delivery date, reduced maintenance (regular repainting to inhibit corrosion is not required) and better acoustic thermal insulation.

Historically, large yachts were built with more than one mast in order to divide the sail area for easier handling. Today's technologies in spars, rigging, sailmaking, powered winches and electronics enable rigs with larger sail areas, higher aspect ratios, larger loads and simpler handling, allowing Mirabella V to be constructed with the tallest mast and largest jib of any sailing craft ever built at the time. One of the procurement challenges was finding sheets strong enough to trim the sails.

== Construction ==
Mirabella V was constructed at the former BVT Surface Fleet yard (formerly VT Shipbuilding, formerly Vosper Thornycroft) at its Woolston Yard, Southampton, Hampshire. Luciana Vittoria specified to naval architect Ron Holland her wishes for interior decoration. After changing hands and being rechristened M5, she was handed over for refit to the Pendennis Shipyard in March 2013. She was relaunched in September 2013 with an extended stern and reverse transom, a lighter ballast arrangement and carbon fibre standing rigging.

== Particulars of ship ==
- LOA: 77.60 m (254.6 ft) (2013)
- LWL (full load): 61.00 m (200.13 ft)
- Beam: 14.82 m (48.6 ft)
- Displacement (half load): 765 tonnes (753 long tons; 843 short tons)
- Ballast: 100 tonnes (98 long tons; 110 short tons) (2013)
- Draught (keel up) 3.80 m (12.5 ft) (2013)
- Draught (keel down): 10.20 m (33.5 ft) (2013)
- Air draught: 88.50 m (290.4 ft) (cannot pass under any bridge that she can navigate to)
- Sail area (mainsail+working jib): 2,385 m^{2} (25,670 sq ft)
- Sail area (mainsail+reacher): 3,380 m^{2} (36,400 sq ft)
- Her 1,833 m^{2} (19,730 sq ft) UPS genoa is the world's largest sail, excluding spinnakers.

== Accommodation ==
The boat has a master suite on the main deck and six cabins for as many as 12 guests. The boat's lazarette stores a 29-foot (8.8 m) tender, Lasers, jet skis, ski boats, kayaks and three remote-controlled models of Mirabella V. The foredeck has two recesses that serve as swimming pools and as storage for two launches.

== Launch ==
Mirabella V was launched on 27 November 2003 and her mast was stepped at the Southampton Empress Dock on 30 December 2003. Her first sea trial took place off Portsmouth on 14 April 2004.

== Charter ==
Under Vittoria's ownership, Mirabella V was chartered for up to $420,000 per week and about 12 weeks per year, with a balanced operating budget if chartered for 14 weeks per year.

== Service ==
After dragging anchor and running aground in Beaulieu-sur-Mer on 16 September 2004, Mirabella V was towed into La Ciotat for a survey and subsequently returned to Vosper Thornycroft in Portsmouth for repairs.

== See also ==
- List of large sailing yachts
- Comparison of large sloops
