= Bruce Farr =

Sailboat designer

Bruce Farr OBE
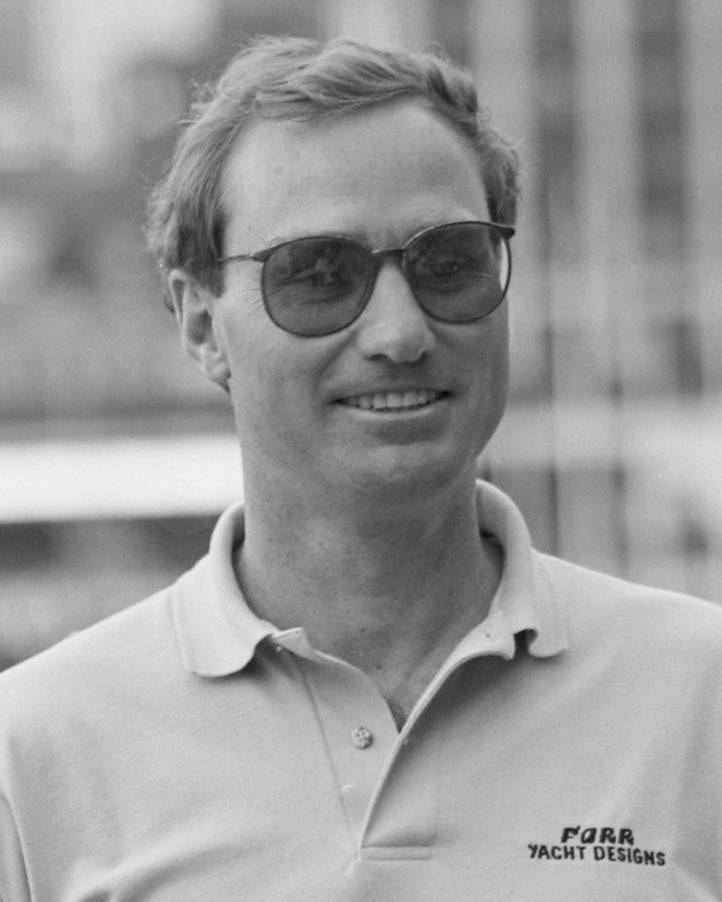
- Farr in the 1980s
- Born: Bruce Kenneth Farr; 1949 (age 76–77); Auckland, New Zealand
- Occupation: Yacht designer

Bruce Kenneth Farr OBE (born 1949 in Auckland) is a New Zealand designer of racing and cruising yachts. Farr‑designed boats have won, challenged for, or placed highly in the Whitbread Round the World Race, America's Cup, and Sydney to Hobart Yacht Race, among others.

Farr's services to yacht design were recognised in the 1990 Queen's Birthday Honours, when he was appointed an Officer of the Order of the British Empire. He currently lives near Annapolis, Maryland, USA.

== Early boats ==
Farr began building boats at the age of 13 near Warkworth north of Auckland. His first boats were plywood hard chine Moth class designs. He later designed and built variants of Cherubs and especially Flying 18s. His early designs were built in plywood with a focus on light weight and good planing shapes. By his late teens he was designing small lightweight keel boats that were successful on the race course.

He first achieved acclaim as a sailboat designer in the highly competitive 18ft Skiff class, popular in Australia and New Zealand. Farr designs won the 18 ft Skiff Giltinan World title several times in the early 70s.

== Ocean racing ==
Boats designed by Farr Yacht Design competed in every Whitbread Round the World Race after 1981, and won the 1986, 1990, 1994 and 1998 races. The first Farr-designed in the Whitbread Race was Ceramco New Zealand, which competed in the 1980 race, and won the Sydney to Hobart the same year. Farr's design proved exceedingly fast, and Ceramco New Zealand would have won the Round the World Race, save for dismasting on the first leg, a trans-Atlantic crossing. The deltas for the rest of the legs would have put Ceramco New Zealand 30 hours ahead of her next competitor. The yacht was helmed and captained by New Zealand yachtsman Sir Peter Blake.

Farr designed the 58-foot yacht which came to be known as Maiden, with the first all-female crew in the 1989–90 Whitbread Round the World Race, skippered by Tracy Edwards MBE. The yacht had previously been skippered by South African Bertie Reed in the 1986-87 BOC single-handed challenge. Maiden is still active, winning the 2023 Ocean Globe Race with an all-female crew.

In 2001 the event was renamed the Volvo Ocean Race. The Farr Yacht Design-designed Illbruck Challenge was victorious in 2002. Farr's Volvo Ocean Race boats fared less well in 2006 as all four of his designs experienced problems after various failures in their Farr-designed keel canting mechanisms, including an abandonment of the yacht Movistar which was unable to prevent the flow of water through the keel box and, to this day, lies on the ocean floor, unrecovered.

Farr's Volvo Ocean 65 was the first ever One-Design selected for the Volvo Ocean Race, for the 2014-15 race, and again in the 2017-18 edition.

Farr is the most successful designer of winners of the Sydney to Hobart Yacht Race, having designed 15 overall winners between 1945 and 2003.

Cookson Boatworks developed a new 50' design, using the Farr office to collaborate, called the Cookson 50. Irish-owned yacht Chieftain, conceived, developed and constructed in 2005 at Cookson's in New Zealand, was the overall winner of the 2007 Rolex Fastnet race. Shortly after it was launched, Chieftain finished 5th at Australia's Hamilton Island Race Week, then won IRC Division B in the 2005 Rolex Sydney to Hobart Yacht Race.

Chieftain competed in all 2006 season Royal Ocean Racing Club races and won class in the Round Ireland, won overall in Round Britain and Ireland Races, was awarded Boat of the Year in Ireland in 2006, and finished as the overall winner of the Rolex Fastnet Race.

== America's Cup ==
Farr is also a designer of America's Cup competitors, including New Zealand's entries in 1986 (co-designed with Ron Holland and Laurie Davidson) and 2000, and Larry Ellison's United States's BMW Oracle Racing Challenger in 2003 (accepted as Challenger of Record for the 2007 Cup). Farr's design Young America (USA-36) proved faster than the other American sailed yachts, but was unsuccessful in defending the Cup in the 1995 Finals, losing 0–5 to a Davidson designed Black Magic of New Zealand, led by the late Sir Peter Blake.

Among the most impressive of Farr's design boats was the 90-foot-long KZ-1, the Michael Fay-sponsored boat brought forth to challenge San Diego Yacht Club immediately following their gaining the cup in 1987. The challenge was unusual in that it did not allow the host yacht club the conventional three to four years to prepare for the event, nor did the challenging boat adhere to the 12-metre class design that the America's Cup had been contested in for thirty-five years, nor did it allow time for other international challengers and defenders to participate. The unconventional challenge was answered with an unconventional defence, and the entire episode serves as an excellent case study on how the process of yacht racing can be mired in the legal system when America's Cup participants radically depart from the spirit of the rules. Farr sailed on the boat during the 1988 America's Cup.

== Cruising yachts ==
Farr's cruising yachts have been sold and sailed the world around. His production designs (mass-produced as opposed to custom) have been produced by a variety of yacht manufacturers including Cookson Boats, Carroll Marine, Beneteau, Concordia, Baltic, and Nauta.

Some of the larger cruising luxury yachts Farr has designed include Bavaria, Mirabella, Philanderer, Sojana, and the two Southern Wind-built 100 footers: Farewell and Farandwide.

== Designs ==
- Bavaria Cruiser 36 (2010)
- Bavaria Cruiser 37 (2013)
- Bavaria Cruiser 40 (2011)
- Beneteau 34.7
- Beneteau 44 CC
- Beneteau 57
- Beneteau 62
- Beneteau First 40.7
- Farr 3.7
- Farr 30
- Farr B30
- Farr 35
- Farr 37
- Farr 38
- Farr 50 Pilot House
- Farr 5000
- Farr 6000
- Farr 7500
- Laser 28
- Farr 1020
- Farr 1220
- Farr 727
- Farr 920
- Farr 1104
- Farr 9.2
- Grand Soleil Maxi One
- Ceramco NZ
- Steinlager 2
- Fisher & Paykel
- NZ Endeavour
- Noelex 30
- NZI Enterprise
- Jenny H
- Disque D'or
- Farr MRX
- Atlantic Privateer
- UBS Switzerland
- Farr Phase 4
- The Card
- Merit
- Maiden
- Brindabella
- Yamaha
- Intrum Justitia
- Winston
- La Poste
- Merit Cup
- Sun Odyssey 51
- Sun Odyssey 52.2
- Tokio
- Tag Heuer
- Mumm 36
- Ragamuffin
- Beneteau First 42S7
- Sayonara
- Farr 44
- Beneteau First 45F5
- Flash Gordon
- Farr 40
- Cookson 12
- Gerontius

== Bibliography ==
- Elliot, Harold; Kidd Robin; Pardon, David (1999). Southern Breeze – A History of Yachting in New Zealand (Hardback). Auckland: Penguin Books. ISBN 0-670-88650-5.
