= Highlander (dinghy) =

Type of racing dinghy

- Class symbol

Development
- Designer: Gordon K. (Sandy) Douglass
- Year: 1949
- Design: One-Design
- Name: Highlander

Boat
- Crew: 3
- Draft: 0.67 feet (0.20 m); 5.0 feet (1.5 m)

Hull
- Type: Monohull
- Construction: Wood or Fiberglass
- Hull weight: 830 pounds (380 kg)
- LOA: 20 feet (6.1 m)
- LWL: 19.5 feet (5.9 m)
- Beam: 6.67 feet (2.03 m)

Hull appendages
- Keel: centerboard

Rig
- Mast height: 27.08 feet (8.25 m)

Sails
- Mainsail area: 169.44 square feet (15.741 m^{2})
- Jib/genoa area: 228.54 square feet (21.232 m^{2})
- Spinnaker area: 300 square feet (28 m^{2})
- Upwind sail area: 228.54 square feet (21.232 m^{2})

The Highlander is a large (20 foot LOA) high performance one-design racing dinghy, also used for day sailing, popular in the United States. It was designed by Gordon K. (Sandy) Douglass in 1949, to be a more comfortable alternative to the Thistle. The Highlander was the last boat built by the Douglass & McLeod company. It was later built by Customflex Inc., and is currently built by Allen Boat Company. Highlander features an 88-pound centerboard. The Highlander sails with a main, jib and spinnaker. With over 1000 boats built, the Highlander has gained reputation for being stable and secure. There are currently 14 racing fleets of Highlanders located in Indiana, Ohio, Kentucky, North Carolina, Tennessee, and Virginia.

Douglass' Flying Scot is known as the little sister to the Highlander.

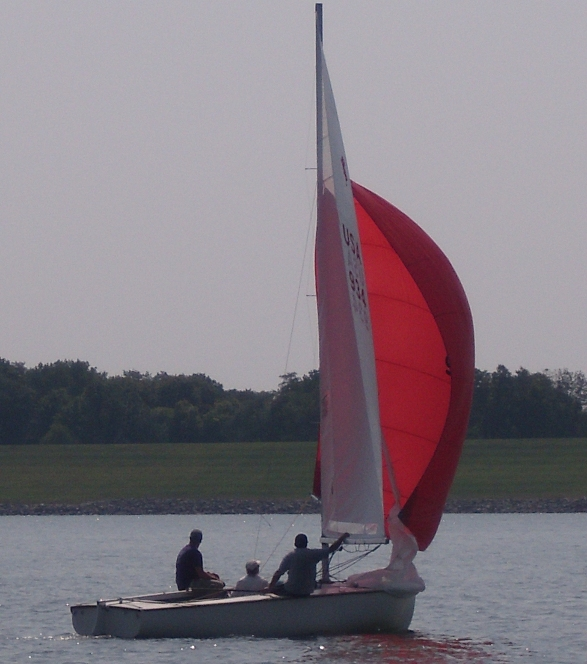
Highlander downwind
