= Seidelmann 30-T =

Sailboat class

Development
- Designer: Bob Seidelmann
- Location: United States
- Year: 1977
- Builder: Seidelmann Yachts
- Role: Cruiser
- Name: Seidelmann 30-T

Boat
- Displacement: 8,800 lb (3,992 kg)
- Draft: 5.42 ft (1.65 m)

Hull
- Type: monohull
- Construction: fiberglass
- LOA: 29.92 ft (9.12 m)
- LWL: 24.00 ft (7.32 m)
- Beam: 11.00 ft (3.35 m)
- Engine: Yanmar 15 hp (11 kW) diesel engine

Hull appendages
- Keel: fin keel
- Ballast: 3,600 lb (1,633 kg)
- Rudder: internally-mounted spade-type rudder

Rig
- Rig type: Bermuda rig
- I foretriangle height: 39.00 ft (11.89 m)
- J foretriangle base: 12.00 ft (3.66 m)
- P mainsail luff: 33.00 ft (10.06 m)
- E mainsail foot: 11.50 ft (3.51 m)

Sails
- Sailplan: masthead sloop
- Mainsail area: 189.75 sq ft (17.628 m^{2})
- Jib/genoa area: 234.00 sq ft (21.739 m^{2})
- Total sail area: 423.75 sq ft (39.368 m^{2})

The Seidelmann 30-T is an American sailboat that was designed by Bob Seidelmann as a cruiser and first built in 1977.

The Seidelmann 30-T is a development of the Seidelmann 30, with a T-shaped cockpit.

== Production ==
The design was built by Seidelmann Yachts in the United States, starting in 1977, but it is now out of production.

== Design ==
The Seidelmann 30-T is a recreational keelboat, built predominantly of fiberglass, with wood trim. It has a masthead sloop rig; a raked stem; a raised counter, reverse transom; an internally mounted spade-type rudder controlled by a wheel and a fixed fin keel or optional shoal draft keel. It displaces 8,800 lb (3,992 kg) and carries 3,600 lb (1,633 kg) of ballast.

The boat has a draft of 5.42 ft (1.65 m) with the standard keel and 4.17 ft (1.27 m) with the optional shoal draft keel.

The boat is fitted with a Japanese Yanmar diesel engine of 15 hp (11 kW) for docking and maneuvering. The fuel tank holds 12 U.S. gallons (45 L; 10.0 imp gal) and the fresh water tank has a capacity of 30 U.S. gallons (110 L; 25 imp gal).

The design has sleeping accommodation for five people, with a double "V"-berth in the bow cabin, a double fold-out straight settee berth in the main cabin and an aft cabin with a quarter berth on the port side. The galley is located on the starboard side just forward of the companionway ladder. The galley is equipped with a two-burner stove, an icebox and a sink. The head is located just aft of the bow cabin on the both sides and includes a sink. Cabin headroom is 77 in (196 cm).

The design has a hull speed of 6.57 kn (12.17 km/h).

== See also ==
- List of sailing boat types
