= John Millen (sailor) =

Canadian sailor

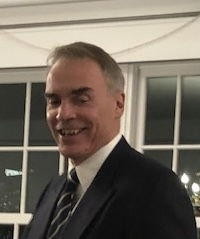
- Millen in 2022

Personal information
- Full name: John Charles Millen
- Born: October 18, 1960 (age 66) Toronto, Canada
- Height: 187 cm (6 ft 2 in)
- Weight: 92 kg (203 lb)

Sailing career
- Sport: Sailing
- Club: Royal Canadian Yacht Club
- Classes: Flying Dutchman, International 14
Medal record
Men's Sailing
Representing Canada
Olympic Games
Bronze medal – third place	1988 Seoul	Flying Dutchman

John Charles Millen (born October 18, 1960, in Toronto) is a Canadian sailor.

Millen won the International 14 class World Championship in 1981 with Frank McLaughlin. He won a bronze medal in the Flying Dutchman Class at the 1988 Summer Olympics with Frank McLaughlin. He also finished 9th in the same category at the 1992 Summer Olympics.

Millen was part of the Canadian team in the 1983 and 1986 America's Cup, sailing first on Canada I and then on Canada II. He was also part of the Canadian team on the Challenger and Defender of the Canada's Cup in 2001, 2003, 2021 and 2022.

Millen crewed on the Royal Canadian Yacht Club Swan 42 yacht Daring that won the 2011 and 2013 New York Yacht Club Invitational Cups and the 2013 Swan 42 National Championships. He was inducted into the Canadian Sailing Hall of Fame in 2022.
