= AMF Apollo 16 =

Sailboat class

Apollo 16
- Class symbol

Development
- Designer: Bruce Kirby
- Location: United States
- Year: 1977
- No. built: 1,100
- Builder: American Machine and Foundry
- Role: One-design racer
- Name: Apollo 16

Boat
- Crew: two or three
- Displacement: 300 lb (136 kg)
- Draft: 2.60 ft (0.79 m) with the centerboard down

Hull
- Type: Monohull
- Construction: Fiberglass
- LOA: 15.75 ft (4.80 m)
- Beam: 5.92 ft (1.80 m)

Hull appendages
- Keel: centerboard
- Rudder: transom-mounted rudder

Rig
- Rig type: Bermuda rig

Sails
- Sailplan: Fractional rigged sloop
- Mainsail area: 90 sq ft (8.4 m^{2})
- Jib/genoa area: 39 sq ft (3.6 m^{2})
- Total sail area: 129 sq ft (12.0 m^{2})

Racing
- D-PN: 92.5

The AMF Apollo 16 is an American sailing dinghy that was designed by Canadian Bruce Kirby as a one-design racer and first built in 1977.

== Production ==
The design was built by the Alcort division of American Machine and Foundry in the United States, starting in 1977. Alcort had been an independent company, but was bought out by AMF in 1969. A total of 1,100 Apollo 16s were built, but it is now out of production.

== Design ==
The Apollo 16 is a recreational sailboat, built predominantly of fiberglass. It has a fractional sloop rig with aluminum spars. The hull features a raked stem, a vertical transom, a transom-hung, kick-up rudder controlled by a tiller and a retractable, kick-up centerboard. It displaces 300 lb (136 kg).

The boat has a draft of 2.60 ft (0.79 m) with the centerboard extended and 6 in (15 cm) with it retracted, allowing beaching or ground transportation on a trailer. It has a hinged mast step to facilitate lowering the mast.

For sailing the design is equipped with internal halyards, an outhaul, boom vang and Cunningham. The mainsheet is controlled from the end of the boom and includes a full-beam mainsheet traveler. Both the mainsail and jib have built-in leech lines. Unusually the jib does not mount to the forestay, but is tensioned by its halyard. The boat is equipped with a stowage bin, hiking straps, plus dual Elystrom vacuum bailers. Factory options included a spinnaker, whisker pole and mainsail jiffy reefing.

The design has a Portsmouth Yardstick racing average handicap of 92.5 and is normally raced with a crew of two or three sailors.

== Operational history ==
In a 1994 review Richard Sherwood wrote, "this one-design has an active racing class. It is designed to carry two to four people comfortably in a large cockpit ... Modifications permitted for racing are minor, with the intention to keep Apollo a true one-design class."

== See also ==
- List of sailing boat types
