= Seidelmann =

Seidelmann may refer to:

- Charlotte Seidelmann, East German sprint canoeist
- Paul Kenneth Seidelmann, American astronomer
- 3217 Seidelmann, a main-belt asteroid named after the astronomer
- Seidelmann 25, an American sailboat design
- Seidelmann 37, an American sailboat design
- Seidelmann 245, an American sailboat design
