= Seidelmann 295 =

Sailboat class

Development
- Designer: Bob Seidelmann
- Location: United States
- Year: 1982
- Builder: Seidelmann Yachts
- Role: Cruiser
- Name: Seidelmann 295

Boat
- Displacement: 7,200 lb (3,266 kg)
- Draft: 6.18 ft (1.88 m) with centerboard down

Hull
- Type: monohull
- Construction: fiberglass
- LOA: 29.42 ft (8.97 m)
- LWL: 24.42 ft (7.44 m)
- Beam: 10.17 ft (3.10 m)
- Engine: Yanmar 15 hp (11 kW) diesel engine

Hull appendages
- Keel: stub keel and centerboard
- Ballast: 3,200 lb (1,451 kg)
- Rudder: transom-mounted rudder

Rig
- Rig type: Bermuda rig
- I foretriangle height: 36.00 ft (10.97 m)
- J foretriangle base: 12.00 ft (3.66 m)
- P mainsail luff: 30.67 ft (9.35 m)
- E mainsail foot: 12.50 ft (3.81 m)

Sails
- Sailplan: masthead sloop
- Mainsail area: 191.69 sq ft (17.809 m^{2})
- Jib/genoa area: 216.00 sq ft (20.067 m^{2})
- Total sail area: 407.69 sq ft (37.876 m^{2})

The Seidelmann 295 is an American sailboat that was designed by Bob Seidelmann as a cruiser and first built in 1982.

== Production ==
The design was built by Seidelmann Yachts in the United States, from 1982 until 1986, but it is now out of production.

== Design ==
The Seidelmann 295 is a recreational keelboat, built predominantly of fiberglass, with wood trim. It has a masthead sloop rig, a raked stem, a plumb transom, a transom-hung rudder controlled by a tiller and a fixed stub keel with a retractable centerboard. It displaces 7,200 lb (3,266 kg) and carries 3,200 lb (1,451 kg) of ballast.

The boat has a draft of 6.18 ft (1.88 m) with the centerboard extended and 3.25 ft (0.99 m) with it retracted, allowing operation in shallow water.

The boat is fitted with a Japanese Yanmar diesel engine of 15 hp (11 kW) for docking and maneuvering. The fuel tank holds 12 U.S. gallons (45 L; 10.0 imp gal) and the fresh water tank has a capacity of 30 U.S. gallons (110 L; 25 imp gal).

The design has sleeping accommodation for six people, with a double "V"-berth in the bow cabin and dual fold-out settee berths in the main cabin, with a fold-away table. The galley is located on the starboard side just forward of the companionway ladder. The galley is L-shaped and is equipped with a two-burner stove, icebox and a sink. The head is located just aft of the bow cabin on the port side. The cabin sole is made from teak and holly.

The design has a hull speed of 6.62 kn (12.26 km/h).

== See also ==
- List of sailing boat types
