= Blazer 23 =

Sailboat class

Development
- Designer: Bruce Kirby
- Location: Canada
- Year: 1988
- Builder: Ontario Yachts
- Role: Racer-Cruiser
- Name: Blazer 23

Boat
- Displacement: 2,200 lb (998 kg)
- Draft: 3.75 ft (1.14 m)

Hull
- Type: monohull
- Construction: fibreglass
- LOA: 23.00 ft (7.01 m)
- LWL: 18.75 ft (5.72 m)
- Beam: 7.92 ft (2.41 m)
- Engine: outboard motor

Hull appendages
- Keel: fin keel
- Ballast: 900 lb (408 kg)
- Rudder: skeg-mounted rudder

Rig
- Rig type: Bermuda rig
- I foretriangle height: 25.75 ft (7.85 m)
- J foretriangle base: 8.90 ft (2.71 m)
- P mainsail luff: 26.00 ft (7.92 m)
- E mainsail foot: 11.18 ft (3.41 m)

Sails
- Sailplan: fractional rigged sloop
- Mainsail area: 145.34 sq ft (13.503 m^{2})
- Jib/genoa area: 114.59 sq ft (10.646 m^{2})
- Total sail area: 259.93 sq ft (24.148 m^{2})

Racing
- PHRF: 180

The Blazer 23 is a Canadian trailerable sailboat that was designed by Bruce Kirby as racer-cruiser and first built in 1988.

The Blazer 23 is a cruising development of the Sonar, using the same hull design, but with a larger cabin with ports and a commensurately smaller cockpit, but slightly more sail area. It is very similar to the Kirby 23.

== Production ==
The design was built by Ontario Yachts in Canada, starting in 1988, but it is now out of production.

== Design ==
The Blazer 23 is a recreational keelboat, built predominantly of fibreglass, with wood trim. It has a fractional sloop rig, a raked stem, a slightly reverse transom, a skeg-mounted rudder controlled by a tiller and a fixed fin keel. It displaces 2,200 lb (998 kg) and carries 900 lb (408 kg) of lead ballast.

The boat has a draft of 3.75 ft (1.14 m) with the standard keel.

The boat is normally fitted with a small 3 to 6 hp (2 to 4 kW) outboard motor for docking and manoeuvring.

The design has sleeping accommodation for four people, with a double "V"-berth in the bow cabin and two straight settees in the main cabin. The galley is located on both sides, just aft of the bow cabin. The galley is equipped with a two-burner stove on the starboard side and a sink on the port side. The head is located under the bow cabin "V"-berth. Cabin headroom is 42 in (110 cm).

For safety the design is equipped with foam flotation.

The design has a PHRF racing average handicap of 180 and a hull speed of 5.8 kn (10.7 km/h).

== Operational history ==
In a 2010 review Steve Henkel wrote that the boat provides, "exceptionally spritely performance in light and moderate air. Foam flotation for safety is also a plus. Worst features: Low profile and an extra-long cockpit result in a short, low cabin with significantly less accommodation space than the Blazer's comp[etitor]s. Due to her deep draft and deep, nonfolding rudder, using a hoist rather than a ramp for launching is a virtual necessity."

== See also ==
- List of sailing boat types
