= D&M 22 =

Sailboat class

Development
- Designer: Sparkman & Stephens
- Location: United States
- Year: 1971
- Builder: Douglass & McLeod
- Role: Racer

Boat
- Displacement: 2,775 lb (1,259 kg)
- Draft: 5.50 ft (1.68 m) with centerboard down

Hull
- Type: monohull
- Construction: fiberglass
- LOA: 22.00 ft (6.71 m)
- LWL: 18.75 ft (5.72 m)
- Beam: 8.42 ft (2.57 m)
- Engine: outboard motor

Hull appendages
- Keel: fin keel and centerboard
- Ballast: 1,000 lb (454 kg)
- Rudder: skeg-mounted rudder

Rig
- Rig type: Bermuda rig
- I foretriangle height: 30.50 ft (9.30 m)
- J foretriangle base: 9.25 ft (2.82 m)
- P mainsail luff: 26.50 ft (8.08 m)
- E mainsail foot: 8.50 ft (2.59 m)

Sails
- Sailplan: masthead sloop
- Mainsail area: 112.63 sq ft (10.464 m^{2})
- Jib/genoa area: 141.06 sq ft (13.105 m^{2})
- Total sail area: 253.69 sq ft (23.569 m^{2})

Racing
- PHRF: 271

The D&M 22 is an American trailerable sailboat that was designed by Sparkman & Stephens as an International Offshore Rule Quarter Ton class racer and first built in 1971. The boat is Sparkman & Stephens' design #2090.

== Production ==
The design was built by Douglass & McLeod in Grand River, Ohio, United States, starting in 1971, but it is now out of production.

== Design ==
The D&M 22 is a racing keelboat, built predominantly of fiberglass, with wood trim. It has a masthead sloop rig, a raked stem, an angled transom, a skeg-mounted, vertically sliding rudder controlled by a tiller and a fixed fin keel or stub keel and centerboard. It displaces 2,775 lb (1,259 kg) and carries 1,000 lb (454 kg) of ballast.

The boat has no sliding hatch and instead uses a raised conical companionway entrance.

The centerboard version boat has a draft of 5.50 ft (1.68 m) with the centerboard extended and 2.75 ft (0.84 m) with it retracted, allowing operation in shallow water or ground transportation on a trailer.

The boat is normally fitted with a small 4 to 6 hp (3 to 4 kW) outboard motor for docking and maneuvering.

The design has sleeping accommodation for four people, with a double "V"-berth in the bow cabin, a straight settee in the main cabin and an aft cabin quarter berth on the port side. The galley is located on the starboard side beside the companionway ladder. The galley is equipped with a two-burner stove, a sink and an ice box. The head is located in the bow cabin under the "V"-berth. Cabin headroom is 58 in (150 cm).

The design has a PHRF racing average handicap of 271 and a hull speed of 5.8 kn (10.7 km/h).

== Operational history ==
A 1972 review in Motor Boating & Sailing magazine noted, "not trying to be all things to all men, Sparkman & Stephens has come up with a most unusual vessel that subordinates everything to racing (and rating) requirements. She is the only one of the four boats with five genuine berths, but the remaining accommodations are definitely Spartan. The intriguing blister top for the cabin was originally seen in racer-cruisers by the Dutch designer E. G. van de Stadt, who used it (as here) to gain headroom, to emplace the mainsheet track, and to provide a leakproof cabin top."

In a 2010 review Steve Henkel wrote, "the peculiarly shaped D&M 22 was designed by Sparkman & Stephens in 1971 to the then-new IOR (International Off-shore Rule). S&S gave her a wide beam, a bubble cabin, a raised deck, and an IOR rating of less than 18, the Rule's maximum for quarter-ton racers at the time. (The Rule has been modified several times since.) S&S's customer for this new boat was Douglass & MacLeod (D&M), a partnership originally interested mainly in small one-design racing boats. However, they had previously commissioned S&S to design the Tartan 27, a successful racer, but wanted to build something a little smaller. They offered the 22 as either a fin-keeler or a keel-centerboarder. Best features: The boat's big interior ... might be considered an advantage to cruisers; however we suspect that most customers were racers looking for a rating advantage. Worst features: It isn't totally clear why the boat was produced for only two years, but her peculiar look and her lack of big wins on the racing circuit may have been factors."

== See also ==
- List of sailing boat types
