= San Juan 23 =

1970s US recreational keelboat

Development
- Designer: Bruce Kirby and Don Clark
- Location: United States
- Year: 1975
- No. built: over 600
- Builder: Clark Boat Company
- Role: Cruiser
- Name: San Juan 23

Boat
- Displacement: 2,700 lb (1,225 kg)
- Draft: 4.75 ft (1.45 m) with the centerboard down

Hull
- Type: monohull
- Construction: fiberglass
- LOA: 23.00 ft (7.01 m)
- LWL: 20.33 ft (6.20 m)
- Beam: 8.00 ft (2.44 m)
- Engine: outboard motor

Hull appendages
- Keel: stub keel with centerboard
- Ballast: 960 lb (435 kg)
- Rudder: transom-mounted rudder

Rig
- Rig type: Bermuda rig
- I foretriangle height: 28.00 ft (8.53 m)
- J foretriangle base: 9.50 ft (2.90 m)
- P mainsail luff: 24.00 ft (7.32 m)
- E mainsail foot: 8.75 ft (2.67 m)

Sails
- Sailplan: masthead sloop
- Mainsail area: 105.00 sq ft (9.755 m^{2})
- Jib/genoa area: 133.00 sq ft (12.356 m^{2})
- Total sail area: 238.00 sq ft (22.111 m^{2})

Racing
- PHRF: 234

The San Juan 23 is a recreational keelboat designed by Canadian Bruce Kirby and Don Clark and first built in 1975. It is a cruising development of the San Juan 24 International Offshore Rule Quarter Ton class racer.

== Production ==
The design was built by the Clark Boat Company of Kent, Washington, United States from 1975 until 1984, when the Clark Boat Company went out of business. Production was then assumed by San Juan Sailboats until 1989. A total of more than 600 boats were completed, but the design is now out of production.

The San Juan 23 was also built in Australia as the Windward 7 and in New Zealand as the Fleetwood 25.

== Design ==
The San Juan 23 is built predominantly of fiberglass. It has a masthead sloop rig, a raked stem, a reverse transom, a transom-hung rudder controlled by a tiller and a fixed fin keel or stub keel and centerboard. The fixed keel model displaces 3,000 lb (1,361 kg) and carries 1,100 lb (499 kg) of lead ballast, while the stub keel and centerboard model displaces 2,700 lb (1,225 kg) and carries 960 lb (435 kg) of lead ballast.

The keel-equipped version of the boat has a draft of 4.00 ft (1.22 m), while the centerboard-equipped version has a draft of 4.75 ft (1.45 m) with the centerboard extended and 1.45 ft (0.44 m) with it retracted, allowing operation in shallow water, or ground transportation on a trailer.

The boat is normally fitted with a small 3 to 6 hp (2 to 4 kW) outboard motor for docking and maneuvering.

The design has sleeping accommodation for five people, with a double "V"-berth in the bow cabin and two settee berths in the main cabin, one of which is 11 ft (3.4 m) in length. The main cabin also has a folding table. The head is located in the bow cabin on the port side, under the "V"-berth. Cabin headroom is 60 in (152 cm).

The design has a PHRF racing average handicap of 234 and a hull speed of 5.9 kn (10.9 km/h).

== Reception ==
In a 2010 review Steve Henkel wrote, "best features: The layout below purportedly will sleep five, but the long, 11-foot berth to starboard wouldn't be comfortable for two six-footers. However, for extra-tall sailors, that berth is perfect. Worst features: Control of hull weight at the factory evidently was not a priority. Reportedly some boats weighed 1,000 pounds over the claimed weight of 3,000 pounds. Shoppers for used boats who plan to race might weigh before buying; the lighter boats are faster."
