= Ideal 18 =

Sailboat class

Development
- Designer: Bruce Kirby
- Location: Canada
- Year: 1989
- No. built: 325
- Builders: Ontario Yachts; Shumway Marine
- Role: One-design racer
- Name: Ideal 18

Boat
- Displacement: 1,240 lb (562 kg)
- Draft: 3.25 ft (0.99 m)

Hull
- Type: Monohull
- Construction: Fibreglass
- LOA: 17.85 ft (5.44 m)
- LWL: 14.35 ft (4.37 m)
- Beam: 6.20 ft (1.89 m)

Hull appendages
- Keel: fin keel
- Ballast: 700 lb (318 kg)
- Rudder: internally-mounted spade-type rudder

Rig
- Rig type: Bermuda rig
- I foretriangle height: 19.00 ft (5.79 m)
- J foretriangle base: 7.00 ft (2.13 m)
- P mainsail luff: 23.50 ft (7.16 m)
- E mainsail foot: 9.25 ft (2.82 m)

Sails
- Sailplan: Fractional rigged sloop
- Mainsail area: 108.69 sq ft (10.098 m^{2})
- Jib/genoa area: 66.50 sq ft (6.178 m^{2})
- Spinnaker area: 240 sq ft (22 m^{2})
- Total sail area: 175.19 sq ft (16.276 m^{2})

Racing
- D-PN: 99.6

The Ideal 18 is a Canadian trailerable sailboat that was designed by Bruce Kirby as a one design racer and first built in 1989.

== Production ==
The design was built by Ontario Yachts in Burlington, Ontario, Canada and also by Shumway Marine in Rochester, New York, United States, where production continues. By 1994, 60 boats had been completed and by 2020, 325 boats had been built.

== Design ==
The Ideal 18 is a recreational keelboat, built predominantly of fibreglass. It has a fractional sloop rig with aluminum spars and swept spreaders. The hull has a raked stem, a walk-through reverse transom, an internally mounted spade-type rudder controlled by a wooden tiller and a fixed fin keel. It displaces 1,240 lb (562 kg) and carries 700 lb (318 kg) of fibreglass-encased lead ballast. It has built-in flotation for safety.

The boat has a draft of 3.25 ft (0.99 m) with the standard keel. The design has a hinged mast for ease of ground transport.

For sailing the design is equipped with a roller furling jib. The seating is on benches moulded into the cockpit sides. The boat has no winches and does not require them. The boat is a displacement, non-planing, design.

The design has a Portsmouth Yardstick racing average handicap of 99.6 and is normally raced with a crew of two sailors, although the cockpit can accommodate four adults.

== Operational history ==
In a 1994 review, Richard Sherwood described the Ideal 18 as, "a strong little keelboat designed for club racing, with rigid rules, such as only one set of sails a year, and no hiking. The jib barely overlaps, is a decksweeper, is self-tacking, and has roller furling. (The roller furling gear is set below deck level.)"

== See also ==
- List of sailing boat types
