= San Juan 24 =

Sailboat class

Development
- Designer: Bruce Kirby
- Location: United States
- Year: 1973
- No. built: 1200
- Builder: Clark Boat Company
- Name: San Juan 24

Boat
- Displacement: 3,200 lb (1,451 kg)
- Draft: 4.00 ft (1.22 m)

Hull
- Type: Monohull
- Construction: Fiberglass
- LOA: 24.00 ft (7.32 m)
- LWL: 19.50 ft (5.94 m)
- Beam: 8.00 ft (2.44 m)
- Engine: Outboard motor

Hull appendages
- Keel: fin keel
- Ballast: 1,650 lb (748 kg)
- Rudder: internally-mounted spade-type rudder

Rig
- Rig type: Bermuda rig
- I foretriangle height: 30.00 ft (9.14 m)
- J foretriangle base: 9.50 ft (2.90 m)
- P mainsail luff: 26.00 ft (7.92 m)
- E mainsail foot: 8.00 ft (2.44 m)

Sails
- Sailplan: Masthead sloop
- Mainsail area: 104.00 sq ft (9.662 m^{2})
- Jib/genoa area: 142.50 sq ft (13.239 m^{2})
- Total sail area: 246.50 sq ft (22.901 m^{2})

Racing
- PHRF: 219 (average)

The San Juan 24 is an American trailerable sailboat that was designed by Bruce Kirby as an International Offshore Rule Quarter Ton class racer.

The design was later developed into the more cruising-oriented San Juan 23 in 1975.

== Production ==
The design was built by the Clark Boat Company in Kent, Washington, United States, starting in 1973 but it is now out of production. A total of 1200 examples of the design were built.

== Design ==
The San Juan 24 is a recreational keelboat, built predominantly of fiberglass, with wood trim. It has a masthead sloop rig, a raked stem, a raised reverse transom, an internally-mounted spade-type rudder controlled by a tiller and a fixed fin keel. It displaces 3,200 lb (1,451 kg) and carries 1,650 lb (748 kg) of lead ballast.

The boat has a draft of 4.00 ft (1.22 m) with the standard keel fitted and is normally fitted with a small 3 to 6 hp (2 to 4 kW) outboard motor for docking and maneuvering.

The design has sleeping accommodation for five people. Cabin headroom is 54 in (137 cm).

The design has a PHRF racing average handicap of 219 with a high of 231 and low of 216. It has a hull speed of 5.92 kn (10.96 km/h).

In a 2010 review Steve Henkel wrote, "Don Clark, designer of the San Juan 21 Mk I and II ... and owner of the Clark Boat Company of Kent, WA, went to Bruce Kirby for a hot new racer to be designed to the IOR Quarter Ton Rule. Clark imposed two important restrictions to broaden the market beyond the macho racer group: the boat could not draw more than 4' 0" or be wider than 8' 0", making the boat more useable in shoal waters and making trailering a little easier. Best features: The boat has been a success (and, at least so far, is the most popular quarter tonner ever), with over a thousand sailing, Worst features: Although she is fast and weatherly going upwind, dead downwind in heavy air under spinnaker she can be a little squirrelly, possibly a result of her narrow underbody aft."
