= Flattie =

Flattie may refer to:

- Geary 18, an American sailboat design, originally called the Flattie
- Selenopidae, a class of spiders
