= Seidelmann 299 =

Sailboat class

Development
- Designer: Bob Seidelmann
- Location: United States
- Year: 1979
- Builder: Seidelmann Yachts
- Role: Cruiser
- Name: Seidelmann 299

Boat
- Displacement: 8,000 lb (3,629 kg)
- Draft: 5.42 ft (1.65 m)

Hull
- Type: monohull
- Construction: fiberglass
- LOA: 29.92 ft (9.12 m)
- LWL: 24.00 ft (7.32 m)
- Beam: 11.00 ft (3.35 m)
- Engine: Yanmar diesel engine

Hull appendages
- Keel: fin keel
- Ballast: 3,600 lb (1,633 kg)
- Rudder: internally-mounted spade-type rudder

Rig
- Rig type: Bermuda rig
- I foretriangle height: 38.50 ft (11.73 m)
- J foretriangle base: 12.00 ft (3.66 m)
- P mainsail luff: 33.00 ft (10.06 m)
- E mainsail foot: 12.00 ft (3.66 m)

Sails
- Sailplan: masthead sloop
- Mainsail area: 198.00 sq ft (18.395 m^{2})
- Jib/genoa area: 231.00 sq ft (21.461 m^{2})
- Total sail area: 429.00 sq ft (39.855 m^{2})

The Seidelmann 299 is an American sailboat that was designed by Bob Seidelmann as a performance cruiser and first built in 1979.

== Production ==
The design was built by Seidelmann Yachts in the United States, between 1979 and 1981, but it is now out of production.

== Design ==
The Seidelmann 299 is a recreational keelboat, built predominantly of fiberglass, with wood trim. It has a masthead sloop rig, a raked stem, a reverse transom, an internally mounted spade-type rudder controlled by a tiller and a fixed fin keel or optional shoal draft keel. The fin keel version displaces 8,000 lb (3,629 kg) and carries 3,600 lb (1,633 kg) of ballast, while the shoal draft version displaces 8,800 lb (3,992 kg) and carries 2,600 lb (1,179 kg) of ballast.

The boat has a draft of 5.42 ft (1.65 m) with the standard keel and 4.18 ft (1.27 m) with the optional shoal draft keel.

The boat is fitted with a Japanese Yanmar diesel engine for docking and maneuvering. The fuel tank holds 12 U.S. gallons (45 L; 10.0 imp gal) and the fresh water tank has a capacity of 30 U.S. gallons (110 L; 25 imp gal).

The design has sleeping accommodation for five people, with a double "V"-berth in the bow cabin, two straight settee berths in the main cabin and an aft cabin with a quarter berth on the port side. The galley is located on the starboard side just forward of the companionway ladder. The galley is L-shaped and is equipped with a stove, icebox and a sink. The head is located just aft of the bow cabin on the port side.

The design has a hull speed of 6.57 kn (12.17 km/h).

== See also ==
- List of sailing boat types
