= Seidemann =

Seidemann is a surname. Notable people with the surname include:

- Bob Seidemann (1941–2017), American graphic artist and photographer
- Hans Seidemann (1901–1967), German general during World War II
- Melissa Seidemann (born 1990), American water polo player
- Siegfried Seidemann, East German slalom canoeist in the late 1950s
- Ulricke Seidemann (born 1955), German chess master

== See also ==
- Scheidemann
- Seidelmann (disambiguation)
- Seidman (disambiguation)
