= Seidelmann 24 =

1980s US recreational keelboat

Development
- Designer: Bob Seidelmann; Bruce Kirby; W. Ross
- Location: United States
- Year: 1981
- No. built: 38
- Builders: Seidelmann Yachts; Paceship Yachts
- Role: Racer-Cruiser
- Name: Seidelmann 24

Boat
- Displacement: 3,000 lb (1,361 kg)
- Draft: 4.40 ft (1.34 m) with centerboard down

Hull
- Type: monohull
- Construction: fiberglass
- LOA: 24.18 ft (7.37 m)
- LWL: 20.50 ft (6.25 m)
- Beam: 8.00 ft (2.44 m)
- Engine: outboard motor

Hull appendages
- Keel: stub keel and centerboard
- Ballast: 1,100 lb (499 kg)
- Rudder: transom-mounted rudder

Rig
- Rig type: Bermuda rig
- I foretriangle height: 27.00 ft (8.23 m)
- J foretriangle base: 10.00 ft (3.05 m)
- P mainsail luff: 27.00 ft (8.23 m)
- E mainsail foot: 9.80 ft (2.99 m)

Sails
- Sailplan: fractional rigged sloop
- Mainsail area: 132.30 sq ft (12.291 m^{2})
- Jib/genoa area: 135.00 sq ft (12.542 m^{2})
- Total sail area: 267.30 sq ft (24.833 m^{2})

The Seidelmann 24, sometimes called the Seidelmann 24-1, is a recreational keelboat built by Seidelmann Yachts in the United States, starting in 1981. A total of 38 boats were completed, but it is now out of production.

== Design ==
Designed by Bob Seidelmann, Bruce Kirby and W. Ross, the Seidelmann 24 is built predominantly of fiberglass, with wood trim. It has a fractional sloop rig, a raked stem, a reverse transom, a transom-hung rudder controlled by a tiller and a fixed stub keel and retractable centerboard. It displaces 3,000 lb (1,361 kg) and carries 1,100 lb (499 kg) of ballast.

The boat has a draft of 4.40 ft (1.34 m) with the centerboard extended and 1.90 ft (0.58 m) with it retracted, allowing operation in shallow water or ground transportation on a trailer. The boat is normally fitted with a small outboard motor for docking and maneuvering.

The design has sleeping accommodation for four people, with a double "V"-berth in and two settee berths around a removable table. The galley is located amidships on the port side and is equipped with a two-burner alcohol-fired stove, a portable icebox and a stainless steel sink. The cabin sole is made from teak and holly.

The design has a hull speed of 6.07 kn (11.24 km/h).
