= List of Thistle (dinghy) championships =

This is a list of Thistle sailboat championships.

== National Championships ==
Source: Thistle Class Association

Year	Carron 1st	Seneca Bowl 2nd	Fairhope 3rd	St Pete Trophy 4th	Richmond 5th
1946	Gordon Douglass				
1947	J. Lovett				
1948	Gordon Douglass				
1949	W. Lawson				
1950	F. Marquardt				
1951	Gordon Douglass				
1952	J. Hendricksen				
1953	R. Brainard				
1954	H. Boston				
1955	Gordon Douglass				
1956	Gordon Douglass				
1957	J. Hendricksen	Samuel Merrick			
1958	J. Jennings	Howard W. Mead			
1959	J. Jenkins	J. Jennings	Charles Morgan	W.D. Mangold	
1960	Bruce Goldsmith	Howard L. Boston	Jerry Jenkins	Ed Walsh	
1961	Ed Walsh	Bruce Goldsmith	James Hendricksen	John Proctor	
1962	P. Bordes	A. Walter Stubner	James Miller	Elmer Richards	Lee Sutton 510
1963	E. Walsh	Jack Wanenmacher	Dennis Posey	Bob Duff	Jon Carriel 821
1964	P. Bordes	Jon Carriel	Dennis Posey	Walt Stubner	Bruno Markeliunas 1234
1965	P. Bordes	Dennis Posey	Nils Dailey	Jim Fairclough	John Proctor 1222
1966	W. Stubner	Tom Wilson	Charles Wiley	P. Bordes	Nils Dailey 1399
1967	P. Bordes	Bill Alexander	Tom Wilson	William Poole	Ed Fracker 1109
1968	D. Clark	Ed Fracker	Tom Wilson	William Alexander	Chuck Steigerwald 1619
1969	J. Miller	Bob White	Lewis Wake	Ned Lockwood	Dennis Clark
1970	K. Foster	Dennis Clark	Charles Steigerwald	Bob White	Charlie Pollak 1708
1971	R. Meissner	James Miller	Ted Fontelieu	Charlie Pollak	Gene Wood 3003
1972	Charles Steigerwald	Bob White	Dennis Clark	Rod Glover	Fuller Moore 3152
1973	J. Foster	Christopher Pollak	Mark Gilliland	James Miller	Ron Meissner 3170
1974	T. Dykstra	Ron Rostofer	Chris Pollak	Fuller Moore	Steve Klotz 1
1975	T. Dykstra	Cliff Seigh	Walt Stubner	Ron Rostorfer	Jerry Pignolet 2830
1976	Mark Gilliland	Larry Klein	Andy Barnes	Jack Bauer	Bob White 124
1977	Robert White	Mark Gilliland	Jack Bauer	Jim Moyer	David Ullman 3485
1978	Andy Barnes	Champ Clover	Mark Gilliland	Jack F. Bauer	Mark Laura
1979	Christopher Pollak	Brent Barbehenn	Greg Fisher	Sandy Rapp	Mark Gilliland 2995
1980	David Ullman	Larry Klein	Greg Fisher	Mark Laura	Ken Van Wagnen 3574
1981	Christopher Pollak	Andy Fox	Brent Barbehenn	Sandy Rapp	Ched Proctor 3428
1982	Brent Barbehenn	Andy Fox	Ched Proctor	Larry Klein	Greg Fisher 3748
1983	Greg Fisher	Mark Gilliland	Champ Glover	Fred Hunger	Brent Barbehenn 3731
1984	Brent Barbehenn	Greg Fisher	Chris Pollak	Jack Bauer	Ched Proctor 1049
1985	David Dellenbaugh	Wayne Pignolet	Chris Klotz	Bill Ehrhorn	Jack Bauer 3743
1986	B. Ehrhorn	Greg Fisher	Chris Klotz	Chris Pollak	John Lovett 3608
1987	Greg Fisher	David Dellenbaugh	John Lovett	Fred Hunger	Brent Barbehenn
1988	Greg Fisher	John Lovett	Mark Laura	Kelson Elam	Fred Hunger
1989	David Dellenbaugh	Ched Proctor	Annie MacLean	Brent Barbehenn	John Wallace
1990	Chris Klotz	Brent Barbehenn	Chris Pollak	Greg Fisher	Dave Dellenbaugh
1991	David Dellenbaugh	Ched Proctor	Chris Klotz	Peter Bream	Chris Pollak
1992	David Dellenbaugh	Alex Smigelski	Chris Klotz	Bill Draheim	Fred Hunger
1993	Bill Draheim	Bill Wilson	Dave Dellenbaugh	Marty Seelig	Alex Smigelski
1994	David Dellenbaugh	Ched Proctor	Marty Seelig	Sjoerd-Jan Vanderhorst	Chris Klotz
1995	Jack Franco	Bryce Dryden	Bill Draheim	John Lovett	Chris Klotz
1996	David Dellenbaugh	Mike Ingham	Bryce Dryden	Ched Proctor	Brad Thompson
1997	Mike Ingham	Ched Proctor	George Szabo	Skip Dieball	Chris Klotz
1998	Bryce Dryden	Mike Ingham	Joe Burcar	Ched Proctor	Eric Gesner
1999	Bryce Dryden	Brad Thomson	Jack Finefrock	Terry Lettenmaier	Eric Gesner
2000	Mike Ingham	Doug Kaukeinen	Bruce King	Eric Gesner	Bryce Dryden
2001	Bruce King	Mike Ingham	Chris Murphy	Jack Finefrock	Erik Goethert
2002	Mike Ingham	Bruce King	Blair Dryden	Eric Gesner	Terry Lettenmaier
2003	Brent Barbehenn	Mike Ingham	Eric Gesner	Blair Dryden	Craig Koschalk
2004	Eric Gesner	Bruce King	Skip Dieball	Mike Ingham	Craig Koschalk
2005	Mike Ingham	Bruce King	D. Dellenbaugh	C. Koschalk	Paul Abdullah
2006	Greg Fisher	Skip Dieball	Paul Abdullah	Kyle Finefrock	Chris Murphy
2007	Mike Ingham	Scott Griffin	Terry Lettenmaier	Greg Fisher	Lloyd Kitchin
2008	Greg Fisher	Mike Ingham	Paul Abdullah	Brad Thompson	Greg Griffin
2009	Dave Dellenbaugh	Brain Kitchen	Mike Ingham	Brent Barbehenn	Charles Kreitler
2010	Mike Ingham	Greg Griffin	Greg Fisher	Brent Barbehenn	Greg Griffin
2011	Skip Dieball	Mike Ingham	Allan Terhune	Chris Murphy	Paul Abdullah
2012	Allan Terhune	Skip Dieball	Mike Ingham	David Tillson	Brent Barbehenn
2013	Allan Terhune	Skip Dieball	Steve White	Chris Murphy	Sam Ingham
2014	Lloyd Kitchin	John Baker	Skip Dieball	Mike Ingham	Scott Griffin
2015	Mike Ingham	Paul Abdullah	Sam Ingham	Greg Griffin	John Baker
2016	Mike Ingham	Paul Abdullah	Kyle Finefrock	John Baker	Mike Gillum
2017	Mike Ingham	Paul Abdullah	Brent Barbehenn	Ben France	Samuel Ingham
2018	Brad Russell	Dave Dellenbaugh	Dan Hesse	Paul Abdullah	Matt Fisher
2019	Greg Griffin	Scott Meyer	Paul Abdullah	Jesse Shedden	Doug Kaukeinen
2020	Cancelled due to the COVID-19 pandemic				
2021	Samuel Ingham	Mike Ingham	Ed Adams	Brian Joyce	Greg Griffin
2022	Paul Abdullah	Dave Dellenbaugh	Dan Hesse	Mike Ingham	Mark Gise
2023	David Hansen	Wayne Pignolet	Sam Ingham	Jesse Shedden	Charlie Yingling
2024	Paul Abdullah	Jon Duffett	Riley Read	Doug Kaukeinen	Mike Ingham
