= Douglass & McLeod =

Sailboat manufacturer

- Company type: Privately held company
- Industry: Boat building
- Founded: 1951
- Founder: Ray McLeod and Sandy Douglass
- Defunct: 1971
- Headquarters: Grand River, Ohio, United States
- Products: Sailboats

Douglass & McLeod was an American boat builder based in Grand River, Ohio. The company specialized in the design and manufacture of fiberglass racing sailboats.

The company was founded by Ray McLeod and Sandy Douglass in 1951. Charles Britton later became a partner in the company.

== History ==
The company was founded to do subcontract finishing work on the wooden plywood hulls of International 14s. Douglass was a boat designer and created the Highlander and the Thistle for production by the new company, as they concentrated on one design racing boats. His Flying Scot followed in 1958.

In 1961 the company commissioned Sparkman & Stephens to design the Tartan 27, which was a commercial and racing success. In 1971 Sparkman & Stephens designed the D&M 22 International Offshore Rule Quarter Ton class racer as a smaller keelboat for the company line, but it was to be the last boat the company would produce.

In 1971 the company plant burned down and the company went out of business. Britton bought the remains and founded Tartan Marine to continue production of the Tartan boats.

== Boats ==
Summary of boats built by Douglass & McLeod:

- Great Lakes 21 1951
- Highlander (dinghy) 1951
- Thistle (dinghy) 1951
- Flying Scot (dinghy) 1958
- Tartan 27 1961
- Tartan 27 Yawl 1961
- C-Lark 1964
- Black Watch 37 1965
- D&M 22 1971

== See also ==
- List of sailboat designers and manufacturers
