= Ontario Yachts =

Sailboat manufacturer

- Type: Privately held company
- Industry: Boat building, fibreglass products
- Founded: 1961
- Founder: Dirk Kneulman Sr. and Maria Kneulman
- Headquarters: Burlington, Ontario, Canada
- Key people: Dirk Kneulman; Don Oakie
- Products: Sailboats
- Website: www.facebook.com/OntarioYachts

Ontario Yachts is a Canadian boat builder at one time based in Oakville, Ontario, then Hamilton, Ontario and more recently in Burlington, Ontario. The company specializes in the manufacture and repair of fiberglass sailboats.

The company was founded in 1961 and continued as the North American builder of the Etchells keelboat in 2018.

== History ==
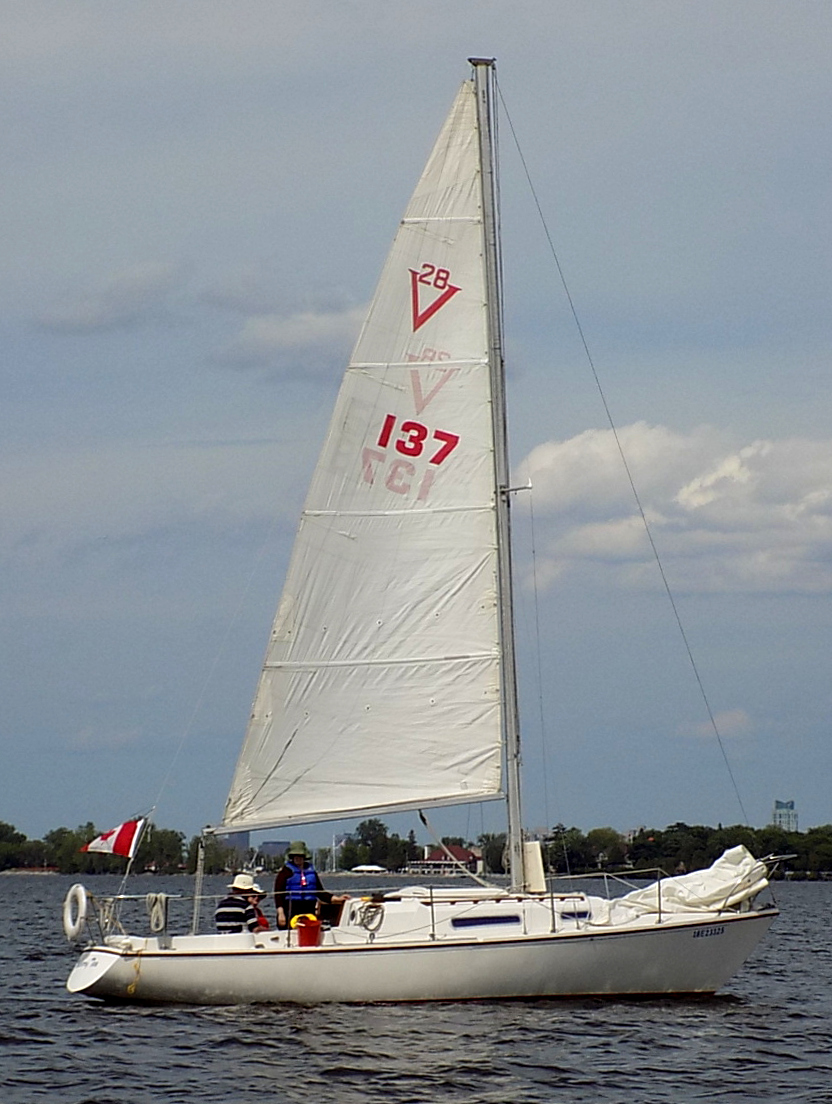
Viking 28

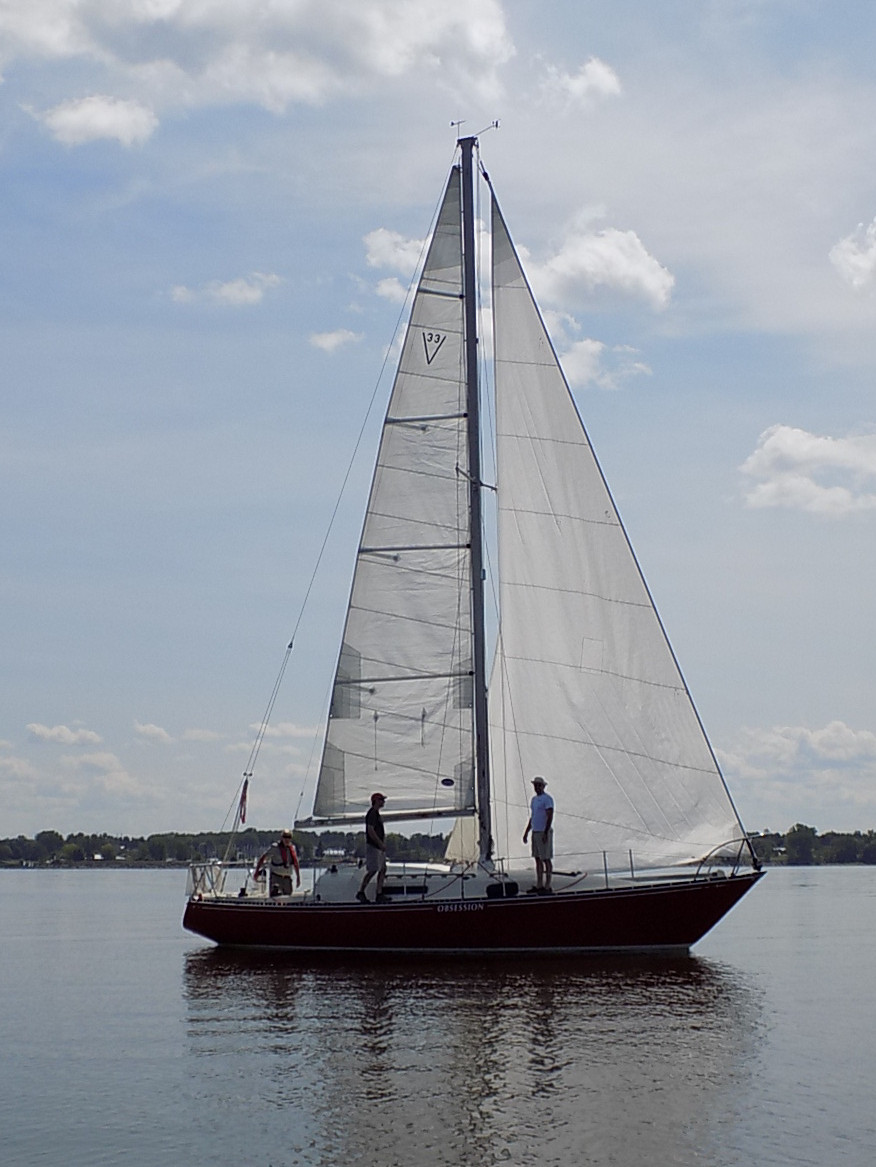
Viking 33

Ontario Yachts was founded by Dirk Kneulman Sr. and Maria Kneulman. Dirk Kneulman Sr. was born in 1922 in Amsterdam, the Netherlands, where he grew up learning to build wooden boats. He immigrated to Canada in 1950 and shortly after built his first Snipe. By 1961 Kneulman was building boats, mostly kayaks and dinghies, including Snipes and 5.5 metre boats, and Sitka spruce spars, and sail battens – all made from wood.

After only a few years in the business, Ontario Yachts established a reputation that attracted highly ranked racing teams to adopt their product. Next, Dirk established a world-wide market for his dinghy, 6 Metre and Dragon masts.

Kneulman's reputation for boat building grew and he began to build Olympic-class boats. In 1968, his final year building Olympic boats, nine of his shop's 5.5 Metre yachts were raced in the Mexico Olympics. Kneulman accompanied the fleet at these Olympic events as a shipwright on the shore support team, to ensure his boats were properly tuned and repaired. One of these 5.5 boats, owned by media magnate Ted Turner, won a world championship in 1972. Kneulman was the Canadian Olympic Sailing Team shipwright in 1972 as well. In 1975, Kneulman began to build Etchells.

Kneulman went to Dwyer Boats in Barrington, Rhode Island to learn fiberglass boat construction during a one-week course. Starting in the late 1960s, Ontario Yachts gained a reputation as a builder of quality fiberglass production boats. The first designs produced were the Viking 22 keelboat and the Albacore dinghy.

Later designs intended for the cruising market included the C&C Yachts-designed Viking 28, Viking 33 and Ontario 32. The Bruce Kirby-designed Sonar was intended for the racing sailboat market.

The company survived the early 1980s recession and the downturn in the fibreglass boat market by diversifying into other lines of fibreglass work. The company was noted as having built the fibreglass support for the pitcher's mound for the Toronto Skydome.

Ontario Yachts is now run by Kneulman's son, Dirk. The company continued in business through 2018 as a boat repair and refurbisher, as well as the North American manufacturer of the Etchells racing keelboat, a boat Ontario Yachts has been constructing as a licensed builder since 1975.

== Boats ==
=== Sailboats ===
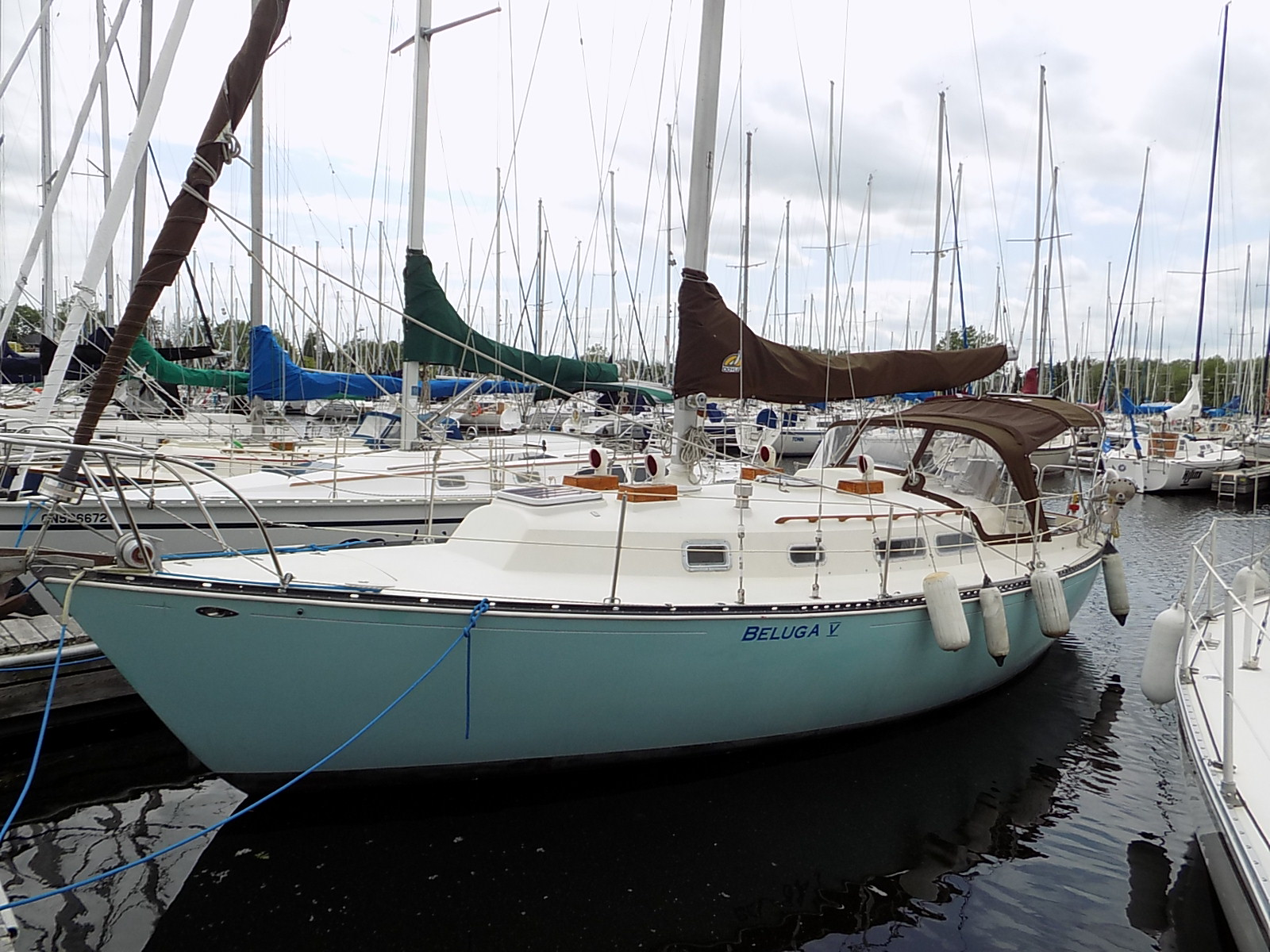
Ontario 32

Sonars racing

Summary of boats built by Ontario Yachts:

- Albacore
- Viking 22
- Etchells
- Viking 28
- Viking 25
- Viking 33
- Viking 34
- Ontario 32
- Ontario 28
- Gazelle 22
- Sonar
- Mark 25
- Blazer 23
- Ideal 18

=== Motorboats ===
- Great Lakes 33 - trawler

== See also ==
- List of sailboat designers and manufacturers
