= Seidelmann 34 =

Sailboat class

Development
- Designer: Bob Seidelmann
- Location: United States
- Year: 1981
- Builder: Seidelmann Yachts
- Role: Cruiser
- Name: Seidelmann 34

Boat
- Displacement: 11,000 lb (4,990 kg)
- Draft: 5.42 ft (1.65 m)

Hull
- Type: monohull
- Construction: fiberglass
- LOA: 34.00 ft (10.36 m)
- LWL: 26.50 ft (8.08 m)
- Beam: 11.82 ft (3.60 m)
- Engine: Yanmar 22 hp (16 kW) diesel engine

Hull appendages
- Keel: fin keel
- Ballast: 5,000 lb (2,268 kg)
- Rudder: internally-mounted spade-type rudder

Rig
- Rig type: Bermuda rig
- I foretriangle height: 43.00 ft (13.11 m)
- J foretriangle base: 14.50 ft (4.42 m)
- P mainsail luff: 37.25 ft (11.35 m)
- E mainsail foot: 11.00 ft (3.35 m)

Sails
- Sailplan: masthead sloop
- Mainsail area: 204.88 sq ft (19.034 m^{2})
- Jib/genoa area: 311.75 sq ft (28.963 m^{2})
- Total sail area: 516.63 sq ft (47.996 m^{2})

The Seidelmann 34 is an American sailboat that was designed by Bob Seidelmann as a cruiser and first built in 1981.

== Production ==
The design was built by Seidelmann Yachts in the United States, starting in 1981, but it is now out of production.

== Design ==
The Seidelmann 34 is a recreational keelboat, built predominantly of fiberglass, with wood trim. It has a masthead sloop rig, a raked stem, a reverse transom, an internally mounted spade-type rudder controlled by a wheel and a fixed fin keel or optional shoal draft keel. It displaces 11,000 lb (4,990 kg) and carries 5,000 lb (2,268 kg) of ballast.

The boat has a draft of 5.42 ft (1.65 m) with the standard keel and 3.90 ft (1.19 m) with the optional shoal draft keel.

The boat is fitted with a Japanese Yanmar diesel engine of 22 hp (16 kW) for docking and maneuvering. The fuel tank holds 18 U.S. gallons (68 L; 15 imp gal) and the fresh water tank has a capacity of 70 U.S. gallons (260 L; 58 imp gal).

The design has sleeping accommodation for five people, with a double "V"-berth in the bow cabin, a straight settee in the main cabin and an aft cabin with a quarter berth on the port side. The galley is located on the starboard side just forward of the companionway ladder. The galley is equipped with a two-burner stove and a double sink. The head is located just aft of the bow cabin on the port side.

The design has a hull speed of 6.9 kn (12.8 km/h).

== See also ==
- List of sailing boat types
