= Clark Boat Company =

Sailboat manufacturer

- Company type: Privately held company
- Industry: Boat building
- Founded: 1960
- Defunct: 1984
- Headquarters: Kent, Washington, United States
- Key people: President: Bob Clark
- Products: Sailboats

The Clark Boat Company was an American boat builder based in Kent, Washington. The company specialized in the design and manufacture of fiberglass sailboats.

The company was founded by Bob Clark in 1960 and continued in business until 1984.

== History ==
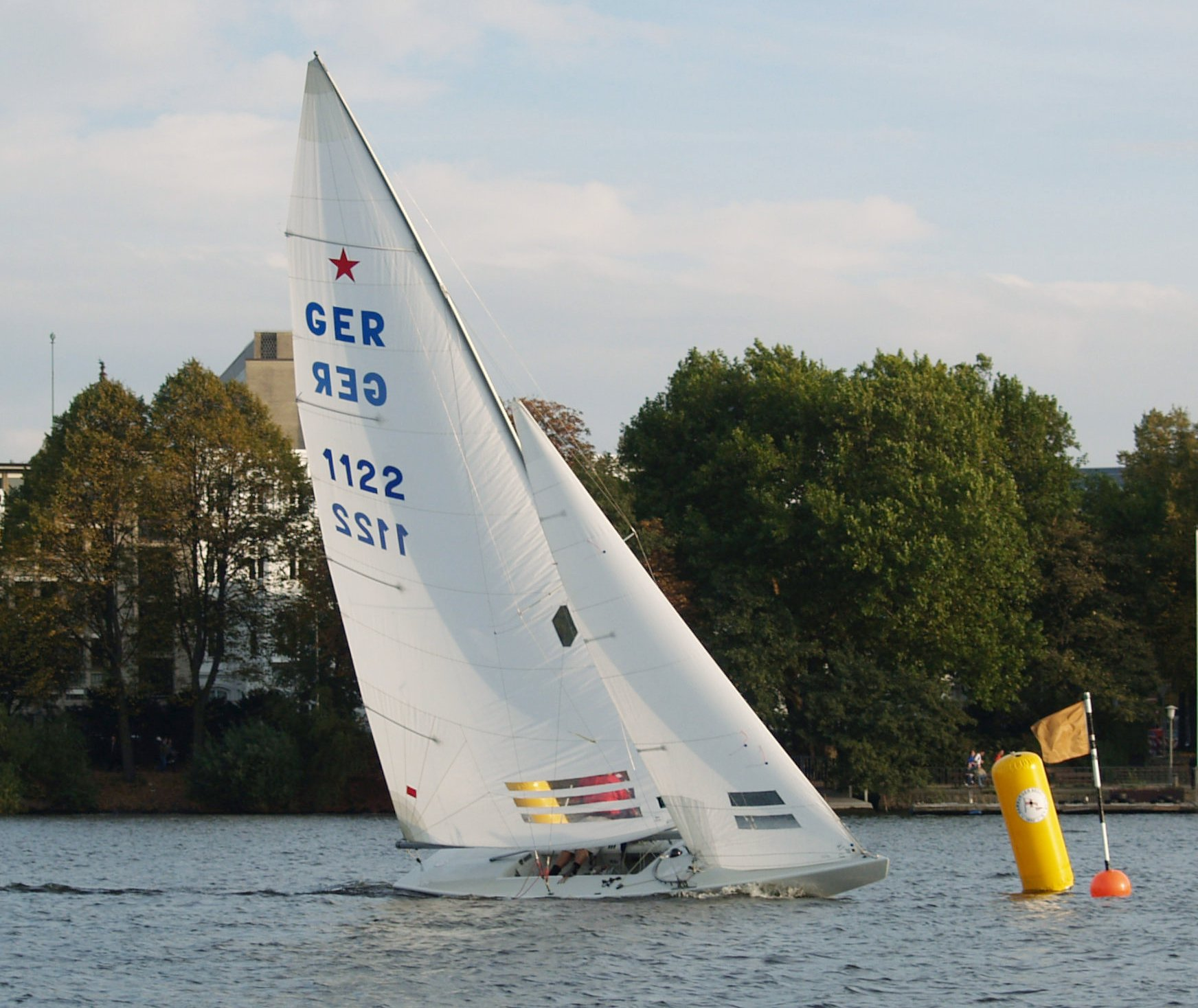
Star keelboat

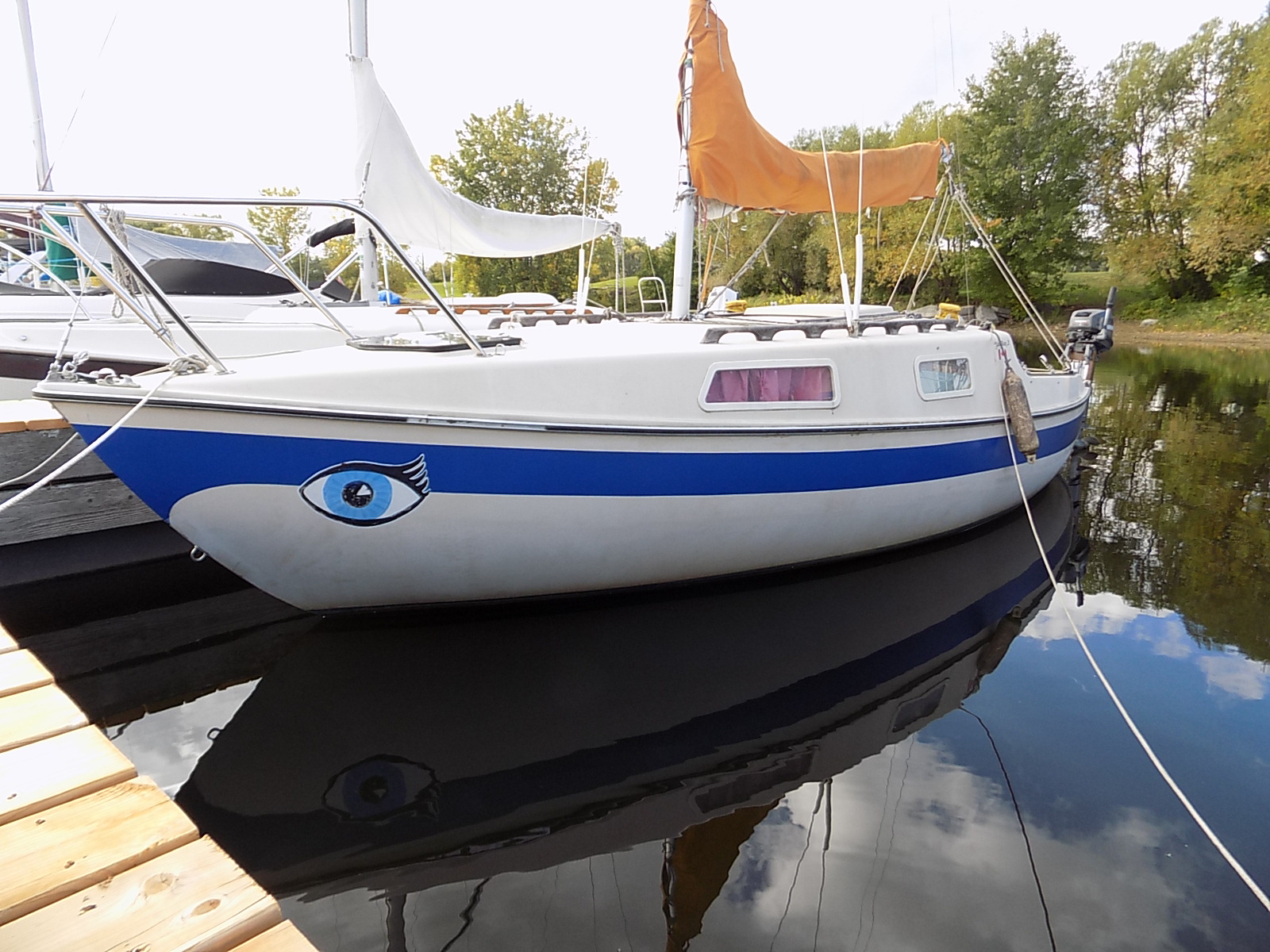
The Don Clark-designed San Juan 21, a design that was well-received at the 1970 Seattle Boat Show.

The first design produced was the Lightning, a racing dinghy. The company was one of the first to produce this boat design in fiberglass. The company went on to produce the OK, 505 and Thistle dinghies, as well as the Star keelboat.

Star production began with the building of the mold plug by Olympic Star class sailing gold medalist, William Earl Buchan. Later, the molds went sent back to Buchan at the end of production.

The company employed many members of Bob Clark's family. Son Dennis started his own sail manufacturing business in 1971, the Clark Sails Loft. Dennis Clark was also a one design champion in several boat classes.

Son Dave Clark became the head of sales and marketing for the company.

Son Don Clark earned a degree in engineering and completed addition studies in naval architecture. He designed the San Juan 21, which was introduced at the 1970 Seattle Boat Show to positive acclaim. This design had a production run of 2600 boats and was the first of the San Juan series of boats, named for the nearby chain of islands. The San Juan boat line was quite commercial successful.

With business growing, the company established an east coast plant at New Bern, North Carolina in 1972.

The company hired Bruce Kirby, of Laser fame, to design the San Juan 24 and it entered production the following year, in 1973, with more than 1,000 examples produced during its production run.

Kirby also designed the San Juan 30 for the International Offshore Rule 1/2 Ton class.

The 1977 San Juan 26 was a trailer sailer equipped with a centerboard, aimed at the same market as the MacGregor 26, but it did not sell well and was replaced in the product line by the more race-oriented San Juan 7.7 in 1979.

The company introduced the San Juan 23 in 1977, with a choice of a fixed or swing keel and two sizes of masts. The same year saw the introduction of the San Juan 28 and the derivative 29, which were among the company's most commercially successful designs.

The company was sold to San Juan Manufacturing in 1984 and it soon went bankrupt. The molds were sold off with some designs being bought by Tanzer Industries in Montreal, who built some boats from the line, until its bankruptcy in 1986.

== Boats ==
The Bruce Kirby-designed San Juan 24

Summary of boats built by Clark:

- 505
- Blue Jay
- C-Lark
- Crown 34
- Geary 18
- Lightning
- OK
- San Juan 7.7
- San Juan 21
- San Juan 21-2
- San Juan 23
- San Juan 23-2
- San Juan 24
- San Juan 26
- San Juan 28
- San Juan 29
- San Juan 30
- San Juan 33S
- San Juan 34
- Star
- Thistle

== See also ==
- List of sailboat designers and manufacturers
