= Mk 25 =

Mark 25 or MK 25 or variation, may refer to:

- Mark 25, a trailerable sailboat
- Mark 25 torpedo
- MK 25, a variant of the SIG Sauer P226, used by US Navy SEALs
- MK25, a variant of the Medium Tactical Vehicle Replacement
- Spitfire Mk25, an Australian homebuilt aircraft modeled after the WWII British Supermarine Spitfire
