= Seidelmann Yachts =

Sailboat builder

- Company type: Privately held company
- Industry: Boat building
- Founded: 1977
- Founder: J. Robert Seidelmann
- Defunct: 1986
- Headquarters: Berlin, New Jersey, United States
- Products: Sailboats

Seidelmann Yachts was an American boat builder based in Berlin, New Jersey. The company specialized in the design and manufacture of fiberglass sailboats.

The company was founded by Bob Seidelmann in 1977.

== History ==
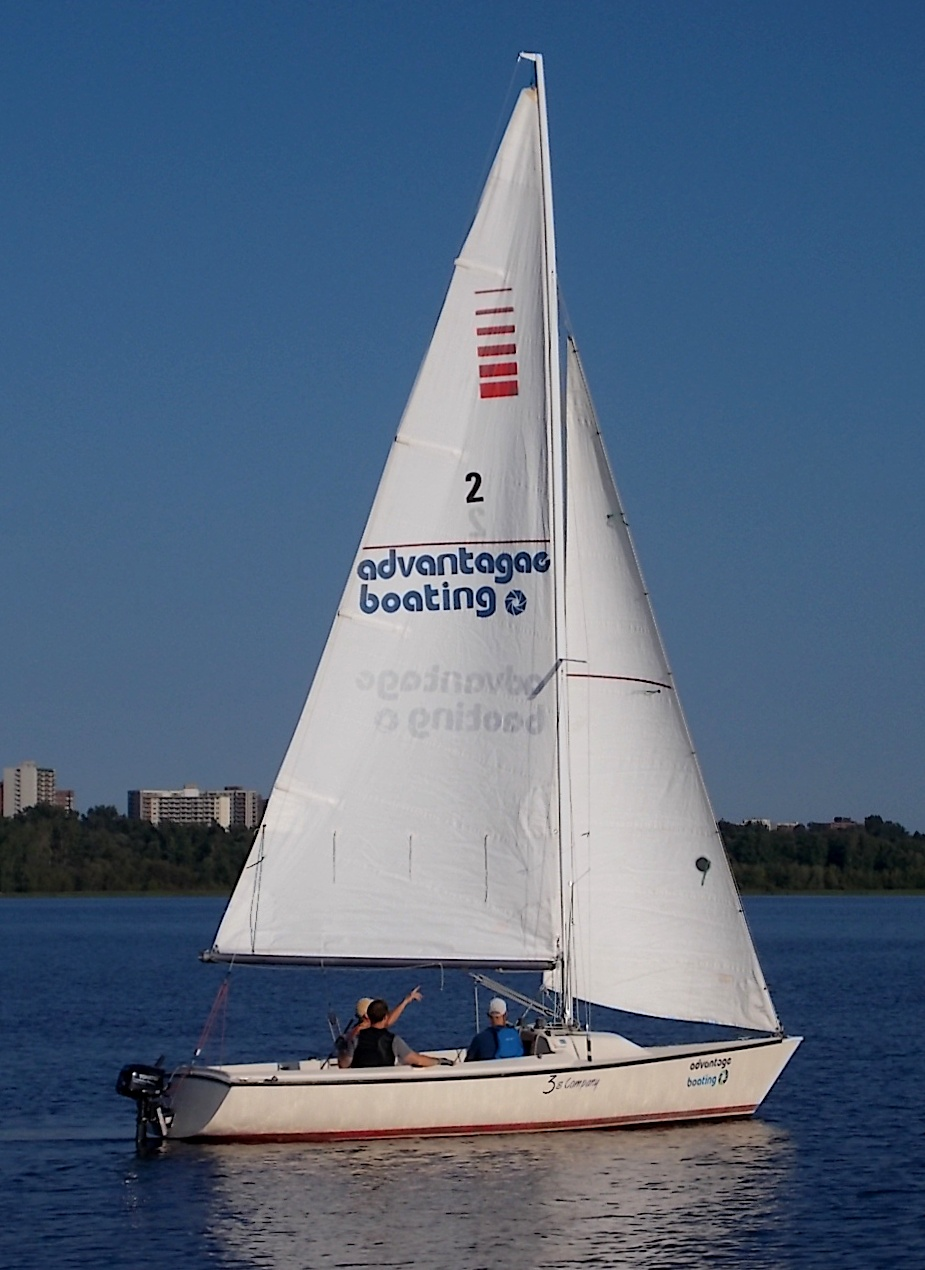
Sonar

Bob Seidelmann was a sailmaker and one design sailor, winning championships in Lightnings, Comets and Dusters, as well as several other one-design racing classes. He founded a sailmaking business, Seidelmann Sails, with his father, Joe Seidelmann, in the early 1960s. He was co-designer of the 1972 Hunter 25 with John Cherubini, which became Hunter Marine's first production boat. He began designing his own boats and started Seidelmann Yachts to produce them.

The first designs produced were the Seidelmann 25, Seidelmann 30 and the Seidelmann 30-T, all in 1977. Reviewer Steve Henkel reports in The Sailor's Book of Small Cruising Sailboats that some Seidelmann 25s suffered from poor construction quality.

Aside from building Bob Seidelmann's own designs, in 1980, the company became the first builder of the Sonar, which had been designed by Canadian naval architect Bruce Kirby, designer of the Laser. The boat sold 60 copies the first month after it was introduced.

Seidelmann also collaborated with Kirby on the 1981 design of the Seidelmann 24 racer-cruiser.

The company went out of business in 1986, just nine years after its founding, in the downturn in the sailboat market following the early 1980s recession in the United States.

== Boats ==
Summary of boats built by Seidelmann Yachts:

- Seidelmann 25 - 1977
- Seidelmann 30 - 1977
- Seidelmann 30-T - 1977
- Seidelmann 299 - 1979
- Seidelmann 37 - 1980
- Sonar (keelboat) - 1980
- Seidelmann 24 - 1981
- Seidelmann 34 - 1981
- Seidelmann 245 - 1981
- Seidelmann 295 - 1982

== See also ==
- List of sailboat designers and manufacturers
