= Kirby 23 =

1980s Canadian recreational keelboat

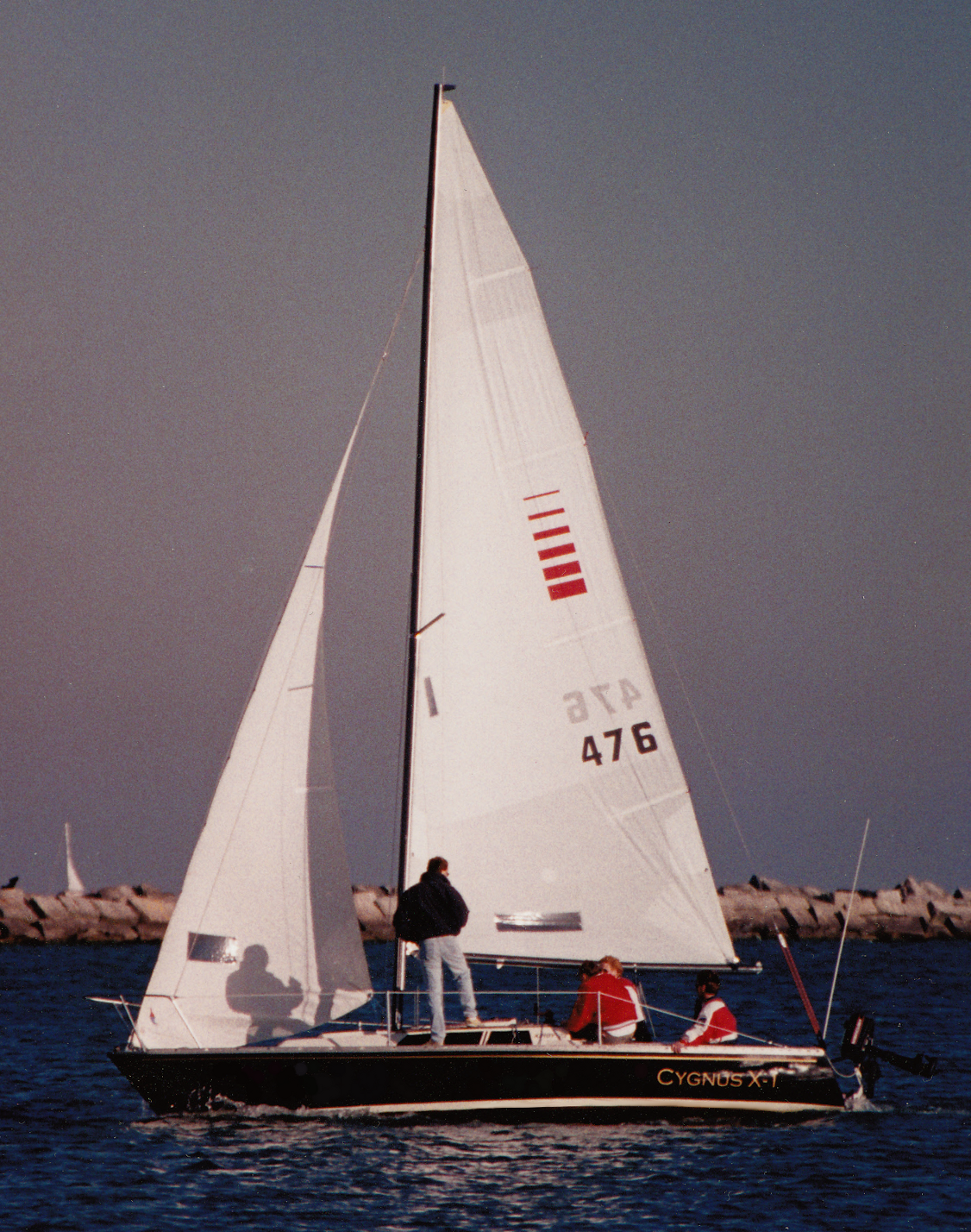

Development
- Designer: Bruce Kirby
- Location: Canada
- Year: 1985
- No. built: 6
- Builder: Ross Marine
- Role: Racer-Cruiser
- Name: Kirby 23

Boat
- Displacement: 2,400 lb (1,089 kg)
- Draft: 3.92 ft (1.19 m)

Hull
- Type: monohull
- Construction: fibreglass
- LOA: 23.00 ft (7.01 m)
- LWL: 18.80 ft (5.73 m)
- Beam: 7.75 ft (2.36 m)
- Engine: outboard motor

Hull appendages
- Keel: fin keel
- Ballast: 900 lb (408 kg)
- Rudder: spade-type rudder

Rig
- Rig type: Bermuda rig
- I foretriangle height: 25.75 ft (7.85 m)
- J foretriangle base: 8.67 ft (2.64 m)
- P mainsail luff: 28.00 ft (8.53 m)
- E mainsail foot: 11.50 ft (3.51 m)

Sails
- Sailplan: fractional rigged sloop
- Mainsail area: 161.00 sq ft (14.957 m^{2})
- Jib/genoa area: 111.63 sq ft (10.371 m^{2})
- Total sail area: 272.63 sq ft (25.328 m^{2})

The Kirby 23 is a recreational keelboat first built in 1985 with six boats completed, and it is now out of production. It was designed by Bruce Kirby as development of the Sonar. It is very similar to the Blazer 23.

The fibreglass hull has a raked stem, a reverse transom, an internally mounted spade-type rudder controlled by a tiller. It has a hull speed of 5.81 kn (10.76 km/h).

It has a fractional sloop rig.
