= Seidelmann 245 =

Sailboat class

Development
- Designer: Bob Seidelmann
- Location: United States
- Year: 1981
- Builder: Seidelmann Yachts
- Name: Seidelmann 245

Boat
- Displacement: 3,000 lb (1,361 kg)
- Draft: 4.42 ft (1.35 m) with centerboard down

Hull
- Type: Monohull
- Construction: Fiberglass
- LOA: 24.18 ft (7.37 m)
- LWL: 20.50 ft (6.25 m)
- Beam: 8.00 ft (2.44 m)
- Engine: Outboard motor

Hull appendages
- Keel: stub keel with centerboard
- Ballast: 1,300 lb (590 kg)
- Rudder: transom-mounted rudder

Rig
- Rig type: Bermuda rig
- I foretriangle height: 27.00 ft (8.23 m)
- J foretriangle base: 10.75 ft (3.28 m)
- P mainsail luff: 27.00 ft (8.23 m)
- E mainsail foot: 9.00 ft (2.74 m)

Sails
- Sailplan: Fractional rigged sloop
- Mainsail area: 121.50 sq ft (11.288 m^{2})
- Jib/genoa area: 145.13 sq ft (13.483 m^{2})
- Total sail area: 266.63 sq ft (24.771 m^{2})

Racing
- PHRF: 210 (average)

The Seidelmann 245 is an American trailerable sailboat that was designed by Bob Seidelmann as a cruiser and first built in 1981. The designer was well known as a champion one design sailor and also as a sailmaker.

== Production ==
The design was built by Seidelmann Yachts in Berlin, New Jersey in the United States between 1981 and 1984, but it is now out of production.

== Design ==
The Seidelmann 245 is a recreational keelboat, built predominantly of fiberglass, with wood trim and aluminum spars. The mast is deck-stepped, with a tabernacle. It has a 7/8 fractional sloop rig, a raked stem, a vertical transom, a transom-hung rudder controlled by a tiller and a fixed stub keel with a centerboard. It displaces 3,000 lb (1,361 kg) and carries 1,300 lb (590 kg) of ballast.

The boat has a draft of 4.42 ft (1.35 m) with the centreboard extended and 1.92 ft (0.59 m) with it retracted, allowing ground transportation on a trailer.

The boat is normally fitted with a small outboard motor for docking and maneuvering. The fresh water tank has a capacity of 10 U.S. gallons (38 L; 8.3 imp gal) and is filled from a deck filler.

The accommodations include a "V"-berth forward and two cabin berths, with stowage underneath them. The galley is split, with the single-burner stove to starboard and the sink on the port side. The chemical head has a privacy door. Ventilation includes a forward hatch and two opening portlights. An anchor locker is located in the bow.

The cockpit includes two jib winches, while a halyard winch is deck-mounted. The jib sheets are controlled though track-mounted blocks. The halyards, mainsail outhaul and reefing lines are internally-run.

The design has a PHRF racing average handicap of 210 with a high of 204 and low of 216. It has a hull speed of 6.07 kn (11.24 km/h).
