= C-Lark =

Sailboat class

- Class symbol

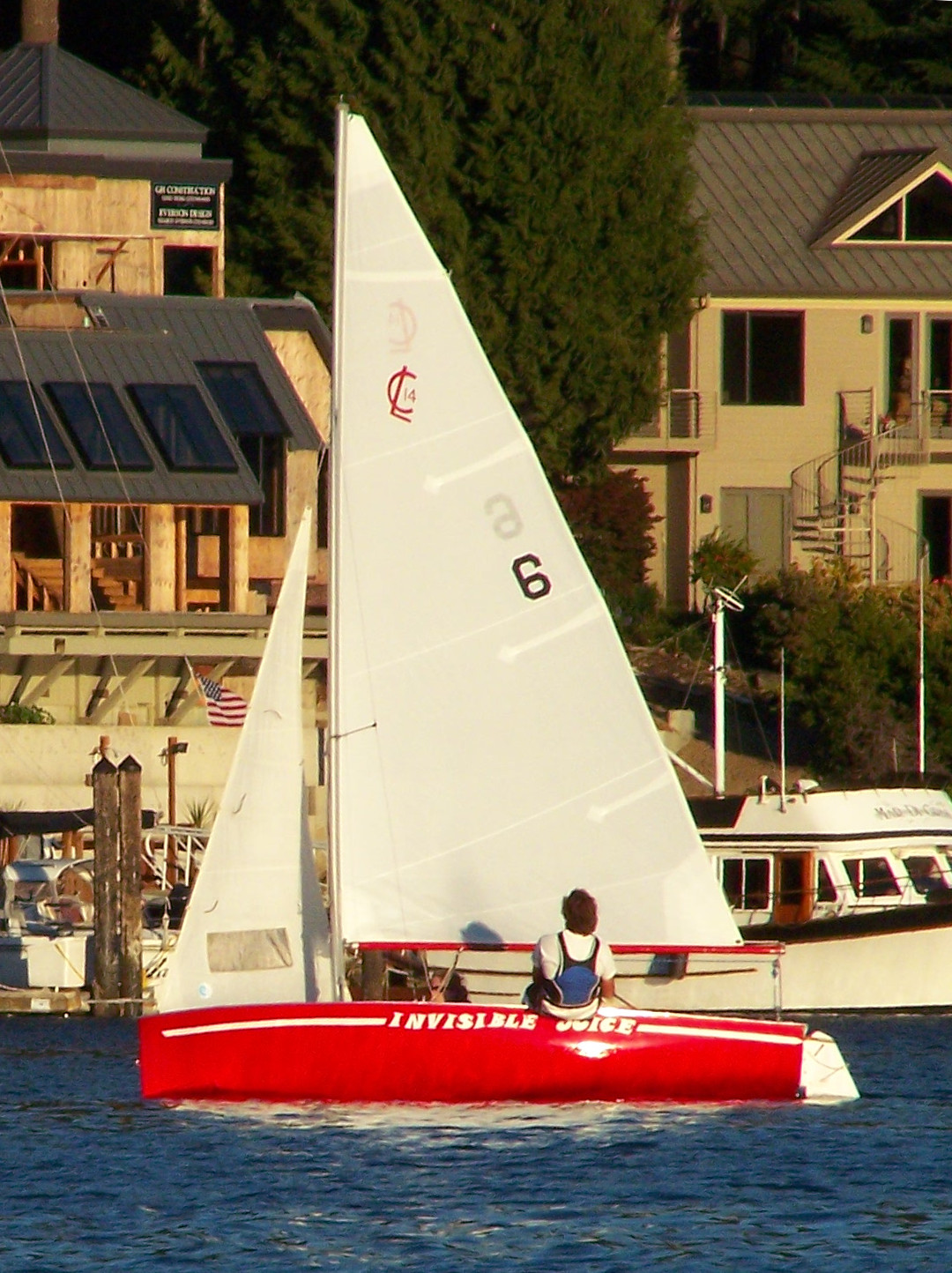

Development
- Designer: Don Clark
- Location: United States
- Year: 1964
- No. built: 1400
- Builders: Clark Boat Company; Douglass & McLeod
- Name: C-Lark

Boat
- Displacement: 295 lb (134 kg)
- Draft: 3.50 ft (1.07 m) with centerboard down

Hull
- Type: Monohull
- Construction: Fiberglass
- LOA: 14.00 ft (4.27 m)
- LWL: 14.00 ft (4.27 m)
- Beam: 5.70 ft (1.74 m)

Hull appendages
- Keel: centerboard
- Ballast: none
- Rudder: transom-mounted rudder

Rig
- Rig type: Bermuda rig

Sails
- Sailplan: Fractional rigged sloop
- Total sail area: 133 sq ft (12.4 m^{2})

The C-Lark is an American sailboat, that was designed by Don Clark and first built in 1964.

== Production ==
The design was built by the Clark Boat Company in Kent, Washington, United States starting in 1964 and also by Douglass & McLeod. Production ended in 1979. During its 15-year production run 1400 examples of the design were completed.

== Design ==
The C-Lark is a recreational dinghy, built predominantly of fiberglass. It has a fractional sloop rig, a plumb stem, a vertical transom, a transom-hung rudder controlled by a tiller and a retractable centerboard keel. It displaces 295 lb (134 kg).

The boat has a draft of 3.50 ft (1.07 m) with the centreboard extended and 0.75 ft (0.23 m) with it retracted, allowing beaching or ground transportation on a trailer.

The design has a hull speed of 5.02 kn (9.30 km/h).

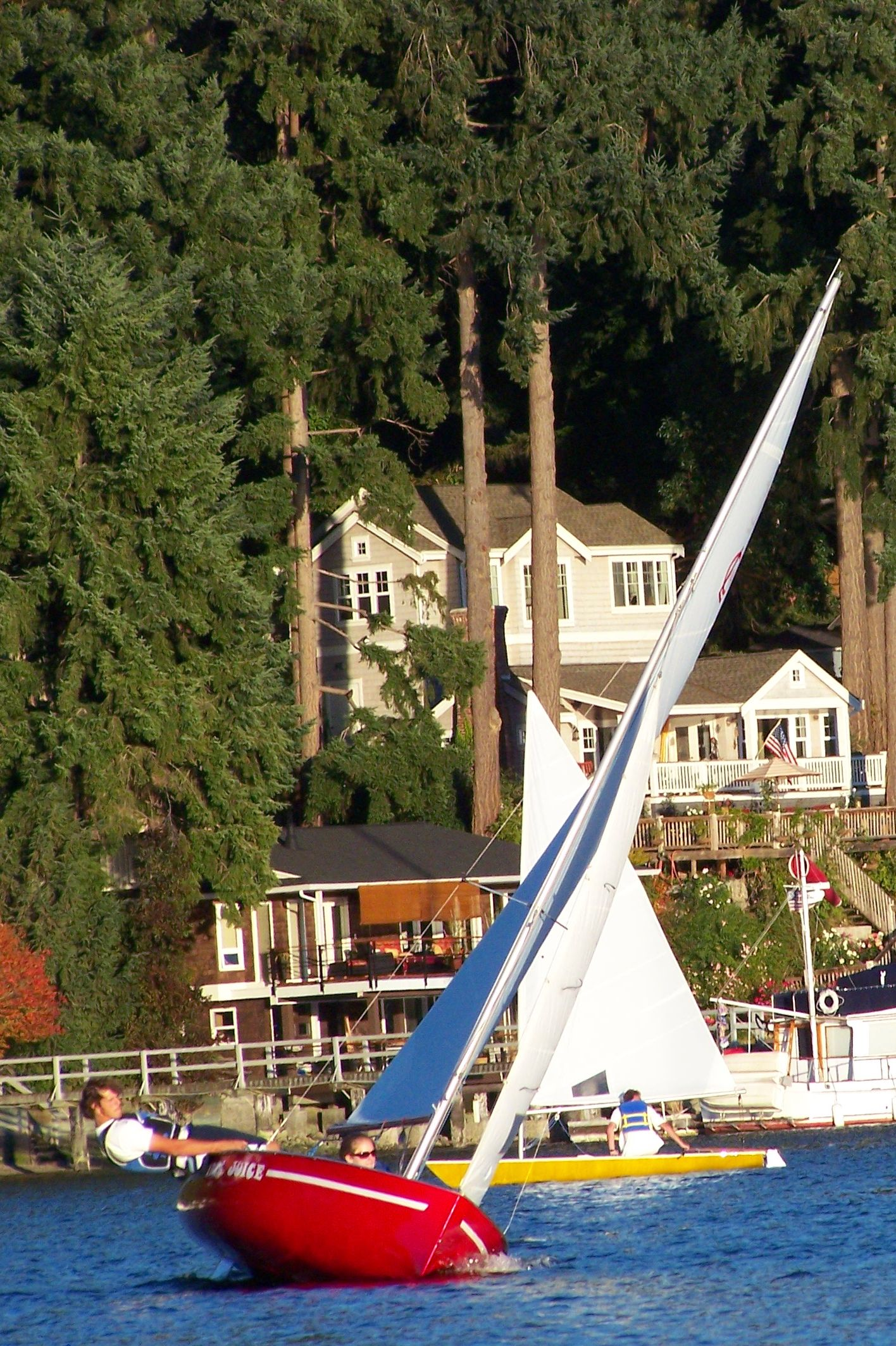
C-Lark sailing upwind with the skipper hiking out

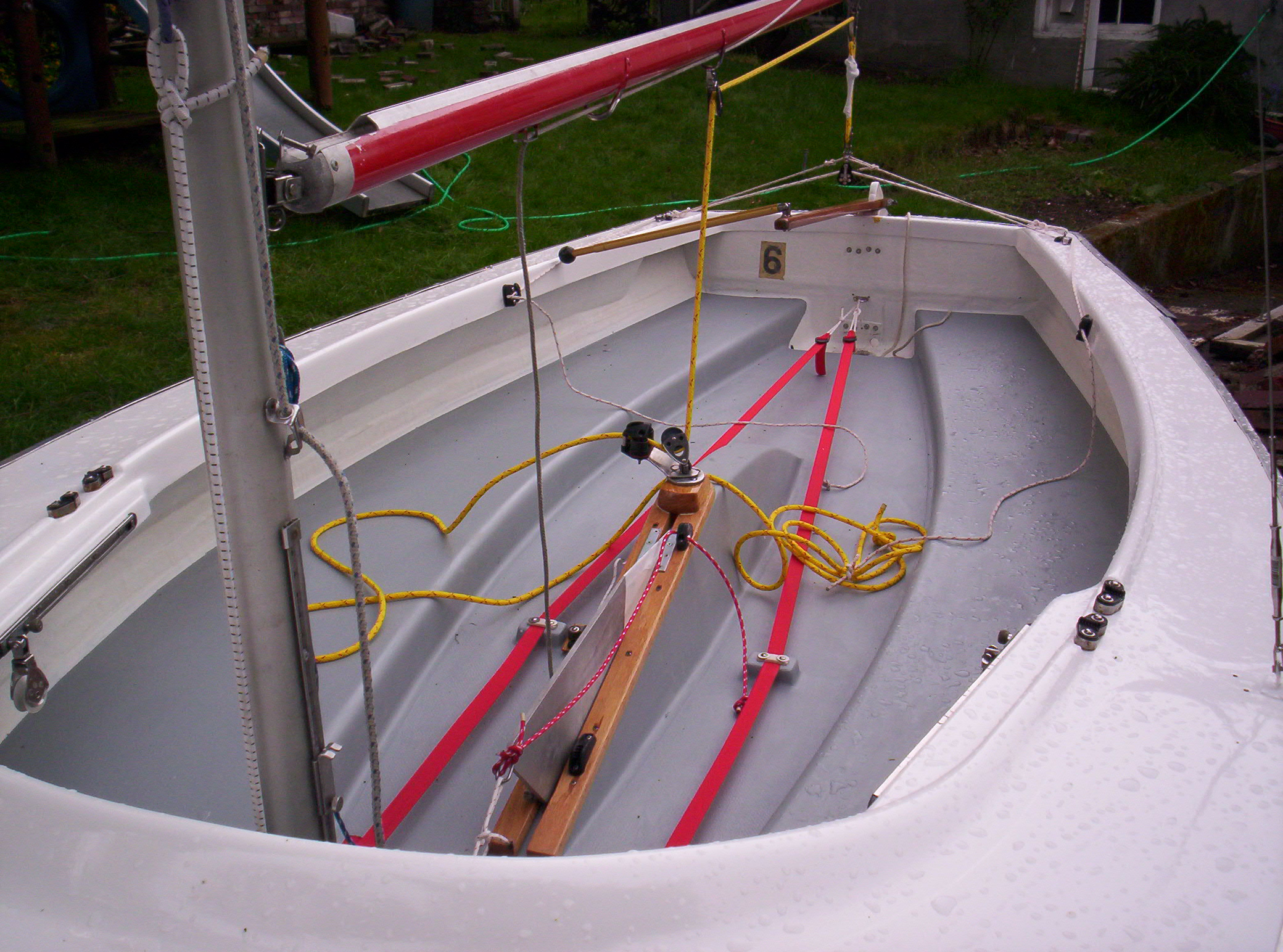
The cockpit of the C-Lark

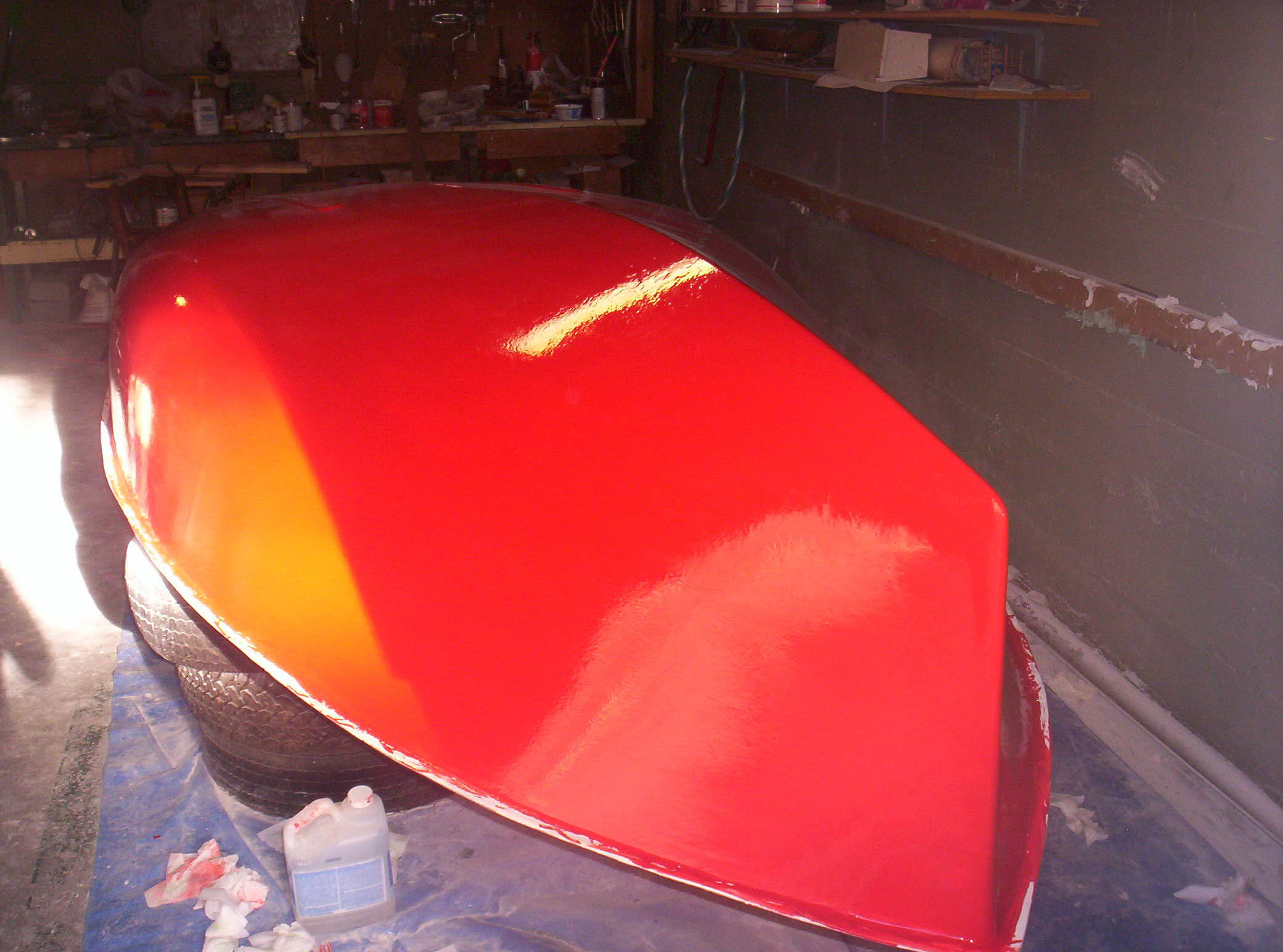
The underside of a C-Lark

== See also ==
- List of sailing boat types

Similar sailboats

- Albacore
- Flying Junior
- Laser 2
- Snipe
