= Canada One =

Type of yacht used in 1983 and 1985

- Yacht club: Secret Cove Yacht Club
- Nation: Canada
- Class: 12-metre
- Sail no: KC–1
- Designer(s): Bruce Kirby
- Builder: Fred McConnell Marine
- Launched: 1982
- Fate: Re-built as Canada II.

Racing career
- AC Challenger Selection Series: 1983

Specifications
- Length: 19.00 m (62.34 ft) (LOA); 13.78 m (45.2 ft) (LWL)
- Beam: 3.84 m (12.6 ft)
- Draft: 2.72 m (8.9 ft)
- Sail area: 168 m^{2} (1,810 sq ft)

Canada One is a 12-metre class yacht that competed in the 1983 Louis Vuitton Cup and finished fourth. In 1985 she was re-built into Canada II.
