= Geary 18 =

Sailboat class

Development
- Designer: Ted Geary
- Location: United States
- Year: 1928
- No. built: 1500
- Builders: Blanchard Boat Company; Clark Boat Company
- Name: Geary 18

Boat
- Displacement: 525 lb (238 kg)
- Draft: 3.75 ft (1.14 m) centerboard down

Hull
- Type: Monohull
- Construction: Wood or fiberglass
- LOA: 18.16 ft (5.54 m)
- Beam: 5.46 ft (1.66 m)

Hull appendages
- Keel: centerboard
- Rudder: internally-mounted spade-type rudder

Rig
- Rig type: Bermuda rig

Sails
- Sailplan: Fractional rigged sloop
- Mainsail area: 114 sq ft (10.6 m^{2})
- Jib/genoa area: 43.5 sq ft (4.04 m^{2})
- Total sail area: 200 sq ft (19 m^{2})

The Geary 18 is an American sailboat that was designed by Ted Geary as a one-design racer and first built in 1926.

The boat was designed in reaction to the deaths of four young sailors in the capsize of a Star on Lake Union in 1927. Geary was determined to design a safer boat for youth sail training.

The boat was originally named the 18' Development Class Flattie, but it was usually called simply the Flattie, due to its flat-bottomed hull shape. In 1961, the year after the designer's death, the class association renamed the design the Geary 18, in his honor.

== Production ==
The design was initially built by the Blanchard Boat Company for the Seattle Yacht Club and by members of the Royal Vancouver Yacht Club and others, including the Clark Boat Company in the United States. Since then many professional and amateur builders have completed examples of the design. A total of 1500 boats have been built.

== Design ==
Conceived as a youth boat, the Geary 18's design goals were "ease of construction, low cost, safety, speed, smartness, and value in training beginning sailors". The resulting boat is a small, unsinkable, recreational keelboat, initially built predominantly of wood, later versions were produced in fiberglass, with wood trim. It has a fractional sloop rig with a full-roach mainsail, a nearly plumb stem a vertical transom, an internally-mounted spade-type rudder controlled by a tiller and a retractable centerboard keel. It displaces 525 lb (238 kg) and can accommodate one to four crew members. Flotation bags are installed under the decks to ensure the boat will not sink.

The boat has a draft of 3.75 ft (1.14 m) with the centerboard extended and 1.92 ft (0.59 m) with it retracted, allowing beaching or ground transportation on a trailer. Both the centerboard and the rudder can be trimmed fore and aft to optimize the boat’s performance. As the centerboard is light, the boat relies on its beam to aid stability.

The class rules allow the use of a single crew trapeze, but no spinnaker. A whisker pole can be used to hold the jib out downwind instead. The design will plane.

The design has been constructed by many different boat-building companies and also by many amateur-builders, so the materials and construction techniques vary considerably. Most earlier boats have straight-sawn frames, with flat hull sides and bottoms, with flat decks, all made from wooden planking. Later wooden boats are mostly built from plywood. Some centerboards have been made from aluminum.

Starting in about the 1960s, many of the boats were built using fiberglass for the hull construction, but wooden hulls are still sailed. The 1996 championships in Ashland, Oregon were won by a wooden boat. In more recent years there has been a trend back to new boats being built of plywood, in place of fiberglass.

== Operational history ==
The first ten boats were built by the Blanchard Boat Company for the Seattle Yacht Club, while another ten boats were amateur-built by members of the Royal Vancouver Yacht Club in 1928, forming racing fleets at those clubs. The Blanchard-built boats sold for US$150 when new. Fleets were quickly initiated in Oregon, Lake Arrowhead, California, and Acapulco, Mexico, the latter two by the designer himself. In the 1938 the design was named the official boat of the Sea Scouts.

Geary continued to promote the class after the Second World War, stating that he aspired to keep "the Flattie class ...as a racing yacht that anyone with little or no boating experience can build and race; to develop faster sailors, not faster boats; to keep the boat in a low-cost bracket, changing the specifications only when a definite saving can be shown."

In the 1990s the class was being widely sailed on the North American Pacific coast, with more than 1,500 completed in total.

The 1995 championships were held on Mission Bay, at San Diego, California, with 21 boats racing. The 1996 championships were held in Ashland, Oregon with 23 boats competing. The 1997 championships were sailed on Cultus Lake, British Columbia.

== Boats on display ==
- The Center for Wooden Boats, Seattle, Washington, United States.

== See also ==
- List of sailing boat types

Similar sailboats

- Albacore (dinghy)
