= Seidelmann 30 =

Sailboat class

Development
- Designer: Bob Seidelmann
- Location: United States
- Year: 1977
- Builders: Seidelmann Yachts; Dickerson Boatbuilders
- Role: Cruiser
- Name: Seidelmann 30

Boat
- Displacement: 8,000 lb (3,629 kg)
- Draft: 5.50 ft (1.68 m)

Hull
- Type: monohull
- Construction: fiberglass
- LOA: 29.92 ft (9.12 m)
- LWL: 27.00 ft (8.23 m)
- Beam: 11.00 ft (3.35 m)
- Engine: inboard engine

Hull appendages
- Keel: fin keel
- Ballast: 3,600 lb (1,633 kg)
- Rudder: internally-mounted spade-type rudder

Rig
- Rig type: Bermuda rig
- I foretriangle height: 41.20 ft (12.56 m)
- J foretriangle base: 13.50 ft (4.11 m)
- P mainsail luff: 36.00 ft (10.97 m)
- E mainsail foot: 11.00 ft (3.35 m)

Sails
- Sailplan: masthead sloop
- Mainsail area: 198.00 sq ft (18.395 m^{2})
- Jib/genoa area: 278.10 sq ft (25.836 m^{2})
- Total sail area: 476.10 sq ft (44.231 m^{2})

The Seidelmann 30, also called the Chesapeake 30, is an American sailboat that was designed by Bob Seidelmann as a cruiser and first built in 1977.

== Production ==
The design was built by Seidelmann Yachts and also by Dickerson Boatbuilders, both in the United States, starting in 1977, but it is now out of production.

== Design ==
The Seidelmann 30 is a recreational keelboat, built predominantly of fiberglass, with wood trim. It has a masthead sloop rig, an internally mounted spade-type rudder and a fixed fin keel. It displaces 8,000 lb (3,629 kg) and carries 3,600 lb (1,633 kg) of ballast.

The boat has a draft of 5.50 ft (1.68 m) with the standard keel.

The design has a hull speed of 6.96 kn (12.89 km/h).

== See also ==
- List of sailing boat types
