= Frank McLaughlin (sailor) =

Canadian sailor

Personal information
- Full name: Frank Joseph McLaughlin
- Born: April 15, 1960 (age 66) Toronto, Canada
- Height: 180 cm (5 ft 11 in)
- Weight: 75 kg (165 lb)

Sailing career
- Sport: Sailing
- Club: Royal Canadian Yacht Club
- Classes: Melges 20, Flying Dutchman, 470, International 14, 420
Medal record
Men's Sailing
Representing Canada
Olympic Games
Bronze medal – third place	1988 Seoul	Flying Dutchman

Frank Joseph McLaughlin (born April 15, 1960 in Toronto) is a Canadian sailor and three time Olympian. Frank was a three time Canadian under 20 Youth Champion and placed 8,9 and 5th in the World Youth Championships from 1977 to 1979. Frank won the International 14 World Championship in 1981 with John Millen in Annapolis Maryland. Frank and John placed 3rd in the 1986 Flying Dutchman World Championships in Rio De Janeiro, Brazil and 2nd in the 1986 European Championships in Yugoslavia. Frank won a bronze medal in the Flying Dutchman Class at the 1988 Summer Olympics in South Korea with John Millen. He also finished 9th in the same category at the 1992 Summer Olympics in Barcelona. Frank placed 15th at the 1984 Summer Olympics in Los Angeles in the 470 class with Martin Ten hove. Frank and Martin won a bronze medal in the 470 class at the 1983 Pan American Games in Caracas Venezuela. Frank's father Paul was a two time Olympian and represented Canada in the Firefly class at the 1948 Olympics in Torquay England, and in the Finn class at the 1952 Olympics in Helsinki Finland. Frank's brother Terry won a silver medal in the Flying Dutchman class at the 1984 Olympics in Los Angeles with Evert Bastett.
