= Seidelmann 25 =

1970s US recreational keelboat

Development
- Designer: Bob Seidelmann
- Location: United States
- Year: 1977
- Builder: Seidelmann Yachts
- Role: Racer-Cruiser
- Name: Seidelmann 25

Boat
- Displacement: 4,600 lb (2,087 kg)
- Draft: 4.33 ft (1.32 m)

Hull
- Type: monohull
- Construction: fiberglass
- LOA: 24.60 ft (7.50 m)
- LWL: 20.00 ft (6.10 m)
- Beam: 9.50 ft (2.90 m)
- Engine: outboard motor

Hull appendages
- Keel: fin keel
- Ballast: 2,200 lb (998 kg)
- Rudder: internally-mounted spade-type rudder

Rig
- Rig type: Bermuda rig
- I foretriangle height: 31.00 ft (9.45 m)
- J foretriangle base: 10.92 ft (3.33 m)
- P mainsail luff: 25.00 ft (7.62 m)
- E mainsail foot: 9.00 ft (2.74 m)

Sails
- Sailplan: masthead sloop
- Mainsail area: 112.50 sq ft (10.452 m^{2})
- Jib/genoa area: 169.26 sq ft (15.725 m^{2})
- Total sail area: 281.76 sq ft (26.176 m^{2})

Racing
- PHRF: 216

The Seidelmann 25 is a recreational keelboat built by Seidelmann Yachts in Berlin, New Jersey, United States, starting in 1977, but it is now out of production.

== Design ==
Designed by Bob Seidelmann, the Seidelmann 25 is built predominantly of fiberglass, with wood trim. It has a masthead sloop rig, a raked stem, a reverse transom, an internally mounted spade-type rudder controlled by a tiller and a fixed fin keel or optional shoal draft keel. It displaces 4,600 lb (2,087 kg) and carries 2,200 lb (998 kg) of ballast.

The boat has a draft of 4.33 ft (1.32 m) with the standard keel and 3.33 ft (1.01 m) with the optional shoal draft keel.

The boat is normally fitted with a small 4 to 10 hp (3 to 7 kW) outboard motor for docking and maneuvering.

The design has sleeping accommodation for four people, with a double "V"-berth in the bow cabin and two straight settee berths in the main cabin. The galley is located on the starboard side just forward of the companionway ladder. The galley is equipped with a two-burner stove and a sink. The portable-type head is located just aft of the bow cabin on the port side. Cabin headroom is 62 in (157 cm).

The design has a PHRF racing average handicap of 216 and a hull speed of 6.0 kn (11.1 km/h).

== Operational history ==
The boat was at one time supported by a class club, the Seidelmann Owners.

In a 2010 review Steve Henkel wrote, "best features: The S25's wide beam gives good space down below (though not as much as her comp[etitor]s). Worst features: Some owners complain about poor construction. With its relatively narrow waterline and soft bilges, the boat is tender in heavy air unless there is plenty of 'rail meat' on board."
