= Mark 25 =

Sailboat class

Development
- Designer: George Harding Cuthbertson
- Location: United States
- Year: 1984
- No. built: 17
- Builders: Mark Yachts; Ontario Yachts; Eli Laminates; Sumner Yachts
- Role: Racer-Cruiser

Boat
- Displacement: 4,130 lb (1,873 kg)
- Draft: 4.25 ft (1.30 m)

Hull
- Type: monohull
- Construction: fiberglass
- LOA: 24.58 ft (7.49 m)
- LWL: 20.00 ft (6.10 m)
- Beam: 9.25 ft (2.82 m)
- Engine: outboard motor

Hull appendages
- Keel: fin keel
- Ballast: 1,779 lb (807 kg)
- Rudder: transom-mounted rudder

Rig
- Rig type: Bermuda rig
- I foretriangle height: 28.00 ft (8.53 m)
- J foretriangle base: 7.70 ft (2.35 m)
- P mainsail luff: 37.00 ft (11.28 m)
- E mainsail foot: 12.00 ft (3.66 m)

Sails
- Sailplan: fractional rigged sloop
- Mainsail area: 222.00 sq ft (20.624 m^{2})
- Jib/genoa area: 107.80 sq ft (10.015 m^{2})
- Total sail area: 329.80 sq ft (30.639 m^{2})

Racing
- PHRF: 216

The Mark 25 is an American trailerable sailboat that was designed by Canadian George Harding Cuthbertson, as one of the first works under his new design firm Motion Designs Limited after he left C&C Design. The boat was intended as a racer-cruiser and first built in 1984.

== Production ==
The design was initially built under contract to Mark Yachts of Old Saybrook, Connecticut by Ontario Yachts in Canada, Sumner Yachts and Eli Laminates of Long Island, New York. Production started in 1984 and ended in 1991 after Mark Yachts had gone out of business, with production continued by Sumner Yachts. A total of 17 boats were completed and the design is now out of production.

== Design ==
The Mark 25 is a recreational keelboat, built predominantly of solid fiberglass, with wood trim. It has a fractional sloop rig with an unusually tall mast, a large mainsail and a small "blade" jib. The hull has a raked stem, a plumb transom, a transom-hung rudder controlled by a tiller and a fixed fin keel. It displaces 4,130 lb (1,873 kg) and carries 1,779 lb (807 kg) of ballast.

The boat has a draft of 4.25 ft (1.30 m) with the standard keel and 3.00 ft (0.91 m) with the optional shoal draft keel.

The boat is normally fitted with a small 6 to 10 hp (4 to 7 kW) outboard motor for docking and maneuvering.

The design has sleeping accommodation for four people, with a double "V"-berth in the bow cabin, a straight settee in the main cabin and an aft quarter berth on the port side. The galley is located on the starboard side, just forward of the companionway ladder. The galley is L-shaped and is equipped with a two-burner stove, icebox and a sink. The head is located just aft of the bow cabin on the port side. Cabin headroom is 68 in (173 cm).

The design has a PHRF racing average handicap of 216 and a hull speed of 6.0 kn (11.1 km/h).

== Operational history ==
In a 1985 Yachting magazine review, Nancy Trimble stated, "George Cuthbertson’s recent return to the drafting board has resulted in a handsome new 25-footer that's a pleasure to sail, singlehanded or with company ... The Mark 25's tall and slender spar stands out in a crowd, and I had no difficulty spotting her from quite a distance away ... A spar that tall—40' off the deck—on a boat her size is one of the most striking features of the Mark 25. Cuthbertson wanted this boat to be easily driven under her big mainsail alone, like a catboat. He succeeded in that effort. But the Mark 25 also carries a non-overlapping blade jib on her fractional rig for improved windward performance, especially in light air. Although designed primarily for cruising sailors, the Mark 25 is a quick little club racer, and she proved it last summer in the competitive Wednesday night racing series on the eastern end of Long Island Sound. If cruising alone is more to your liking than taking a crew around the race course, the Mark 25, has internal halyards, all led aft to the cockpit for easy singlehandling. Manufactured by Eli Laminates in Oakdale, Long Island, N.Y, the boat's hull is of all fiberglass layup with no core or exotics that would add to her moderate price ... Belowdecks, her 9'3" beam and neatly 6' of headroom provide cruising comfort and berths for five people."

In a 2010 review Steve Henkel wrote, "Mark Yachts Ltd. of Old Saybrook, [Connecticut], induced George Cuthbertson of C&C fame to design this unusual "cat-sloop" rigged yacht. The design concept was to maximize cruising accommodations while maintaining performance similar to "day racers" like the J/24, (The scheme was only partially successful; as an indicator, the Mark 25's PHRF is about 216–6 seconds lower than the C&C 25—compared to the J/24's 174.) Various builders (including Ontario Yachts of Canada, Sumner Yachts, and Eli Laminates) apparently built the vessels at various times, and after Mark Yachts Ltd. disappeared, Sumner marketed the Mark 25 in 1990 and 1991. Two keel drafts were available, shoal (3' 0") and deep (4' 3"). The deep version gives a very noticeable improvement in performance, The big, high aspect-ratio rig is a distinctive feature, resulting in a bridge clearance of almost 44 feet ... and the boat will sail respectably even without the tiny blade jib. Best features: The boat is easy to handle, well balanced and very maneuverable. The high trunk cabin and "bubble" in the deck at the mast, plus wide 9'3" beam, help provide plenty of room below. A huge companionway hatch and sizable portlights give plenty of cabin light. Worst features: Deep cockpit seats are comfortable but limit visibility over the high cabin house."

== See also ==
- List of sailing boat types
