= Flying Scot (dinghy) =

Sailboat class

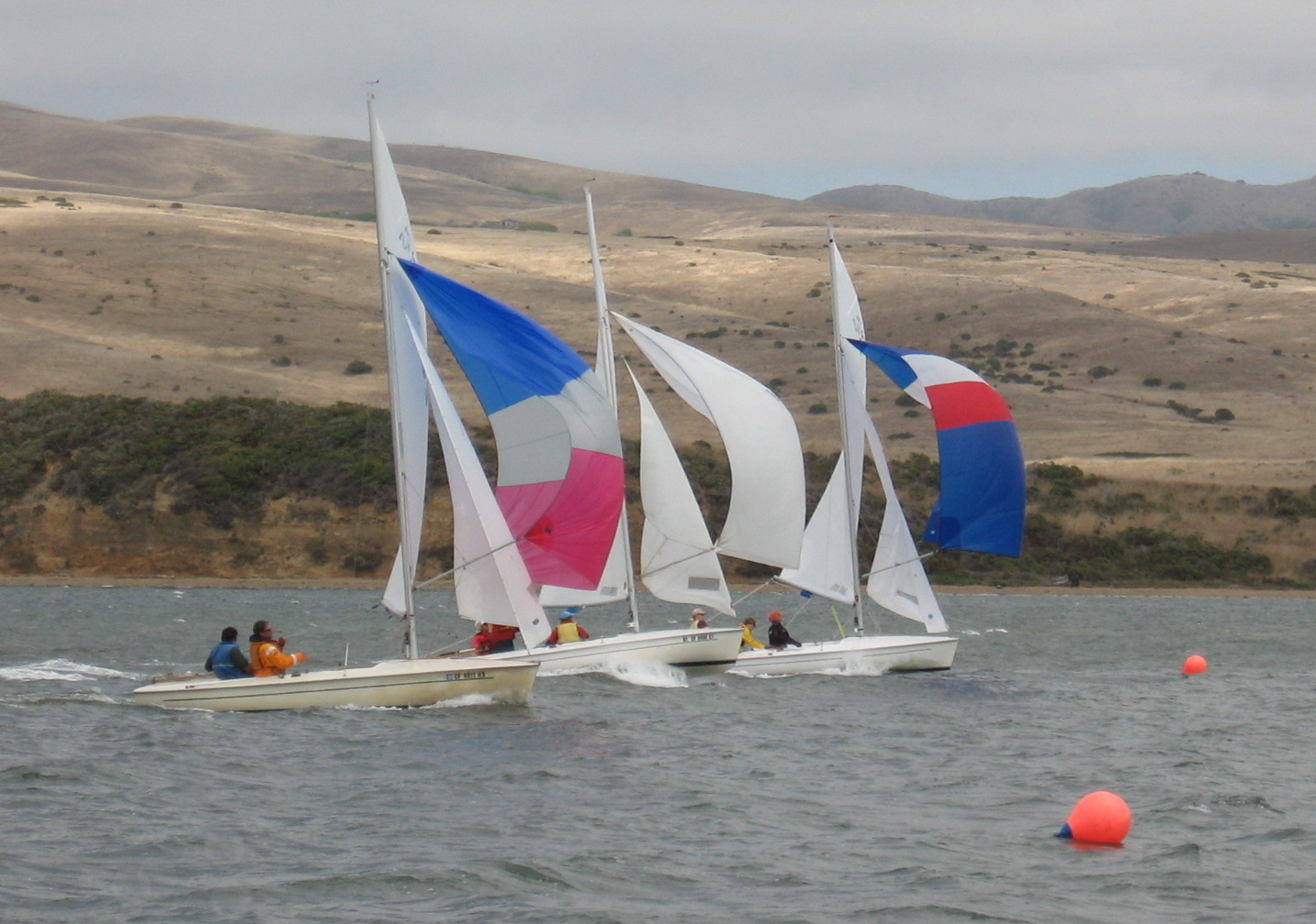

Development
- Designer: Sandy Douglass
- Location: United States
- Year: 1958
- No. built: 5,300
- Builders: Tanzer Industries; Douglass & McLeod; Customflex; Lofland Sail-craft; Flying Scot, Inc.
- Role: One-design racer
- Name: Flying Scot

Boat
- Crew: three
- Displacement: 850 lb (386 kg)
- Draft: 4.00 ft (1.22 m) with centerboard down

Hull
- Type: monohull
- Construction: fiberglass
- LOA: 19.00 ft (5.79 m)
- LWL: 18.50 ft (5.64 m)
- Beam: 6.75 ft (2.06 m)

Hull appendages
- Keel: centerboard
- Rudder: transom-mounted rudder

Rig
- Rig type: Bermuda rig

Sails
- Sailplan: fractional rigged sloop
- Mainsail area: 138 sq ft (12.8 m^{2})
- Jib/genoa area: 53 sq ft (4.9 m^{2})
- Spinnaker area: 200 sq ft (19 m^{2})
- Total sail area: 191 sq ft (17.7 m^{2})

Racing
- D-PN: 90.3

The Flying Scot is an American sailing dinghy that was designed by Sandy Douglass as a one-design racer and first built in 1958.

== Production ==
The design has been previously built by Tanzer Industries, Douglass & McLeod, Customflex and Lofland Sail-craft. Today it is built by Flying Scot, Inc. in Deer Park, Maryland, United States. A total of 5,300 boats have been completed.

== Design ==
The Flying Scot is a recreational sailboat, built predominantly of fiberglass with a balsa core. It has a fractional sloop rig with aluminum spars. The hull has a raked stem, a plumb transom, a transom-hung rudder controlled by a tiller and a retractable centerboard that weighs 105 lb (48 kg) and is raised with a 6:1 mechanical advantage assist. The boat displaces 850 lb (386 kg) and has foam flotation under the seats for safety.

The hulls are all one-design and built from the same molds.

The boat has a draft of 4.00 ft (1.22 m) with the centerboard extended and 8 in (20 cm) with it retracted, allowing beaching or ground transportation on a trailer.

For sailing the design is equipped with a spinnaker of 200 sq ft (19 m^{2}). A boom vang and mainsail roller furling are permitted under class rules. The rules also prohibit the use of hiking straps, trapezes, leech cords, Barber haulers, twings or self-bailers. Mast adjustment is also not allowed while racing.

The design has a Portsmouth Yardstick racing average handicap of 90.3 and is normally raced with a crew of three sailors, although the boat can accommodate as many as eight people.

== Operational history ==
The boat is supported by an active class association, the Flying Scot Sailing Association, which controls the boat's design and organizes racing regattas. By 2020, the club had 118 fleets racing the boat.

In a 1994 review Richard Sherwood wrote, "a big, fast centerboard boat, the Flying Scot has an unusual reverse sheer. Capacity is eight adults. With hard bilges and a slightly tunneled hull, stability is good. Rigging is relatively simple, and the class rules discourage complexity."

The design was inducted into the American Sailboat Hall of Fame in 1998. The citation says in part: "a hotshot small boat sailor with a penchant for planing, designer Gordon "Sandy" Douglass was already famous in 1957 for high speed creations: the 17-foot Thistle and 20-foot Highlander. For his new design, he reined in his desire for all-out performance to produce a moderate boat that could still sail well, but be managed easily by a couple. This meant reducing sail area and letting the hull form swell for stability: then simplifying the rigging and deck layout, installing spacious and comfortable seats, and building it on the heavier, more durable side, Douglass found the rest of the formula."

In a 2017 review in Soundings, Joni Palmer, manager of the US Naval Academy’s sailing program said, "It’s not a high-performance boat, so anybody can get into the boat. You can’t tweak everything. It’s hard to gain an edge. You have to concentrate on tactics and speed. It’s just a solid boat. But these boats do plane!"

== See also ==
- List of sailing boat types
