= Thistle (dinghy) =

Sailboat class

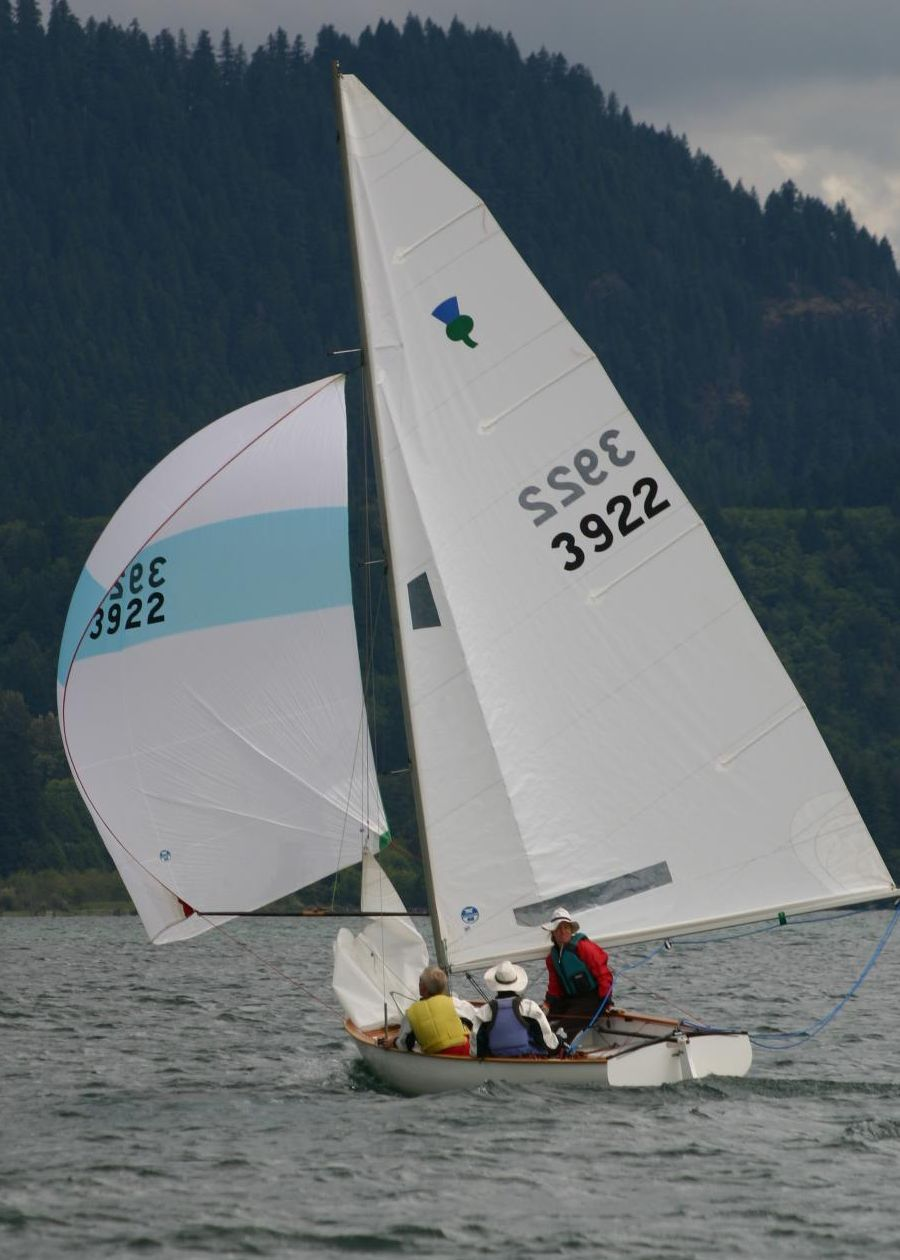

Development
- Designer: Sandy Douglass
- Location: United States
- Year: 1945
- No. built: 4,000
- Builders: Douglass & McLeod; Clark Boat Company; W. D. Schock Corp; Filip; Ellie; Aleph; Johanski; Spens; First to the Mark; Fox; Northwest One Design; Great Midwest Yacht Company; Beacon Composites

Boat
- Displacement: 515 lb (234 kg)
- Draft: 4.50 ft (1.37 m) with the centreboard down

Hull
- Type: Monohull
- Construction: Fiberglass
- LOA: 17.00 ft (5.18 m)
- LWL: 17.00 ft (5.18 m)
- Beam: 6.00 ft (1.83 m)

Hull appendages
- Keel: centreboard
- Rudder: transom-mounted rudder

Rig
- Rig type: Bermuda rig

Sails
- Sailplan: Fractional rigged sloop Masthead sloop
- Mainsail area: 136 sq ft (12.6 m^{2})
- Jib/genoa area: 55 sq ft (5.1 m^{2})
- Spinnaker area: 220 sq ft (20 m^{2})
- Total sail area: 191 sq ft (17.7 m^{2})

Racing
- D-PN: 83.0

The Thistle is an American planing sailing dinghy that was designed by Sandy Douglass as a one-design racer and first built in 1945.

== Production ==
The design was originally built by Douglass & McLeod in the United States, but the company went out of business in 1971. Since then production has passed to several American builders, including the Clark Boat Company, W. D. Schock Corp, Northwest One Design and the current builder since 1975, Great Midwest Yacht Company. More than 4,000 boats of this design have been completed.

W. D. Schock Corp records indicate that they built 250 boats between 1959 and 1975.

== Design ==
The Thistle is a recreational sailboat, with the earlier production models made from molded plywood and the more recent models built predominantly of fiberglass, with wood structural members and trim. The seats are a fiberglass-sandwich construction, and provide built-in flotation. It has a fractional sloop rig with aluminum spars and three spreader bars. The hull has no decks, a plumb stem and transom, a transom-hung rudder controlled by a tiller and a retractable, drum-mounted centerboard. It displaces 515 lb (234 kg).

The boat has a draft of 4.50 ft (1.37 m) with the centerboard extended and 6 in (15 cm) with it retracted, allowing beaching or ground transportation on a trailer.

For sailing the design is equipped with symmetrical spinnaker of 220 sq ft (20 m^{2}) and built-in flotation.

The design has a Portsmouth Yardstick racing average handicap of 83.0 and is normally raced with a crew of three sailors, although it has a capacity of six people.

== Operational history ==
By 1994 the design was being raced in more than 150 fleets.

In a 1994 review Richard Sherwood wrote, "the Thistle was influenced by English dinghy design and is similar to the International 14, another racing dinghy with a plumb bow and flat run. Originally, boats were of molded wood. Racing crew is three, but the Thistle will carry six. She will fit into a garage. The Thistle has a lot of sail and a lot of speed. Class rules are strict. Gear that may be technically legal but provides an advantage is not allowed ... The Thistle is the boat used as the primary yardstick for Portsmouth Numbers."

== See also ==
- List of sailing boat types

Similar sailboats

- International 14
