= Canada II =

- Yacht club: Royal Nova Scotia Yacht Squadron
- Nation: Canada
- Class: 12-metre
- Sail no: KC–2

Racing career
- AC Challenger Selection Series: 1987

Canada II is a 12-metre class yacht that competed in the 1987 Louis Vuitton Cup. The boat's designer was Bruce Kirby and the boat was built by Fred McConnell Marine, of Parry Sound, Ontario. The boat's original home was in Halfmoon Bay, British Columbia at the Secret Cove Yacht Club.

The yacht Steve Killing-designed True North, which hailed from the Royal Nova Scotia Yacht Squadron, was another Canadian challenger of record in 1987. Paul Phelan, a Toronto yachtsman and restaurateur, added major financial support on one condition: that both ventures merge. The Canadians decided in 1986 to amalgamate their efforts, and Canada II was selected for the challenger series in Fremantle, Australia.

David Howard, as CEO, chose Perry Connolly as the director of operations of the joint bid, and Terry Neilson was chosen as skipper.

Since 1993, the yacht has been in Philipsburg, Sint Maarten, "racing" as a tourist attraction against others of its type.
