= Sandy Douglass =

American architect

- Born: Gordon K. Douglass; October 22, 1904; Newark, New Jersey
- Died: February 12, 1992 (aged 87)
- Occupations: Sailboat designer and builder

Gordon K. "Sandy" Douglass (October 22, 1904 – February 12, 1992) was an American racer, designer, and builder of sailing dinghies. Two of his designs, the Thistle and the Flying Scot, are among the most popular one design racing classes in the United States. The Flying Scot was inducted into the American Sailboat Hall of Fame. As a small boat racer, Douglass was five times the North American champion in the 10 Square Meter International Sailing Canoe, five times the United States national champion in the Thistle, and seven times the Flying Scot North American champion.

== Personal life ==
Douglass was born in 1904, in Newark, New Jersey. His father, George P. Douglass, was a real estate manager who became manager of The Dakota, an apartment building in New York City, moving the family there in 1920. His father was a champion sailing canoe racer, and Douglass' sailing experience started in his youth. His family vacationed in the Thousand Islands region of the Saint Lawrence River, eventually buying a small island there.

Douglass went to prep school at Collegiate School in New York City, then to Dartmouth College, graduating in 1926. His athletic pursuits included college gymnastics, canoe paddling, ice boating, and sailing canoe racing. He qualified for the Canadian national canoe paddling team, but was not allowed to go to the 1936 Olympics because he was American. Douglass befriended English boat designer and racer, Uffa Fox, whom he met through sailing canoe racing.

== Career ==
After false starts at selling Buicks and painting portraits, Douglass took up boat building in 1938. At several shops in Ohio, he built sailing canoes, International 14's, Interlakes, and Stars.

After a wartime job as a lofter for a shipbuilding company, Douglass designed the Thistle in 1945. Influenced by Uffa Fox's International 14 design, and built using the innovative molded plywood technique, the Thistle quickly caught on with dinghy racers. It was light, fast, and held to strict one design standards by the Thistle Class Association, founded by Douglass.

In 1949, Douglass designed the Highlander, a 20-foot (6.1 m) racing dinghy still sailed in the US south and midwest. His goal was that it be stable and fast, and yet be family friendly, using a broader beam and harder bilges than in previous designs. He published plans in 1950, launched the first hull in 1951 and exhibited at the New York Boat Show in 1952. He raced his designs, both to promote them and the sport of dinghy sailing. His involvement with the Thistle and the Highlander ended in 1951 when he split with Ray McLeod, his business partner.

Douglass then designed the Flying Scot in 1956 for construction in the then-new technique of glass-reinforced polyester. Larger and more stable than the Thistle, the Flying Scot also became popular. Its wide beam and the prohibition of hiking straps were an effort to make the boat more competitive for smaller-sized people like Douglass and his wife, Mary, who crewed for him for 30 years.

His dinghy designs incorporated then-novel features that later became standard for other types of high-performance racing dinghies, including hiking straps and dual-lead lines to both sides of the boat.

== Retirement ==
Douglass moved his business to Oakland, Maryland, in 1958. Douglass retired in 1971 and sold the company. The successor company, Flying Scot, Inc., still builds Flying Scots in Oakland. Douglas died in 1992. He and Mary (1907–2005) had one son, Alan. He wrote an autobiography, Sixty Years Behind the Mast: The Fox on the Water, in 1986. Among his hobbies was barbershop singing.

Douglass was inducted into the National Sailing Hall of Fame in 2020.
