= Leech line =

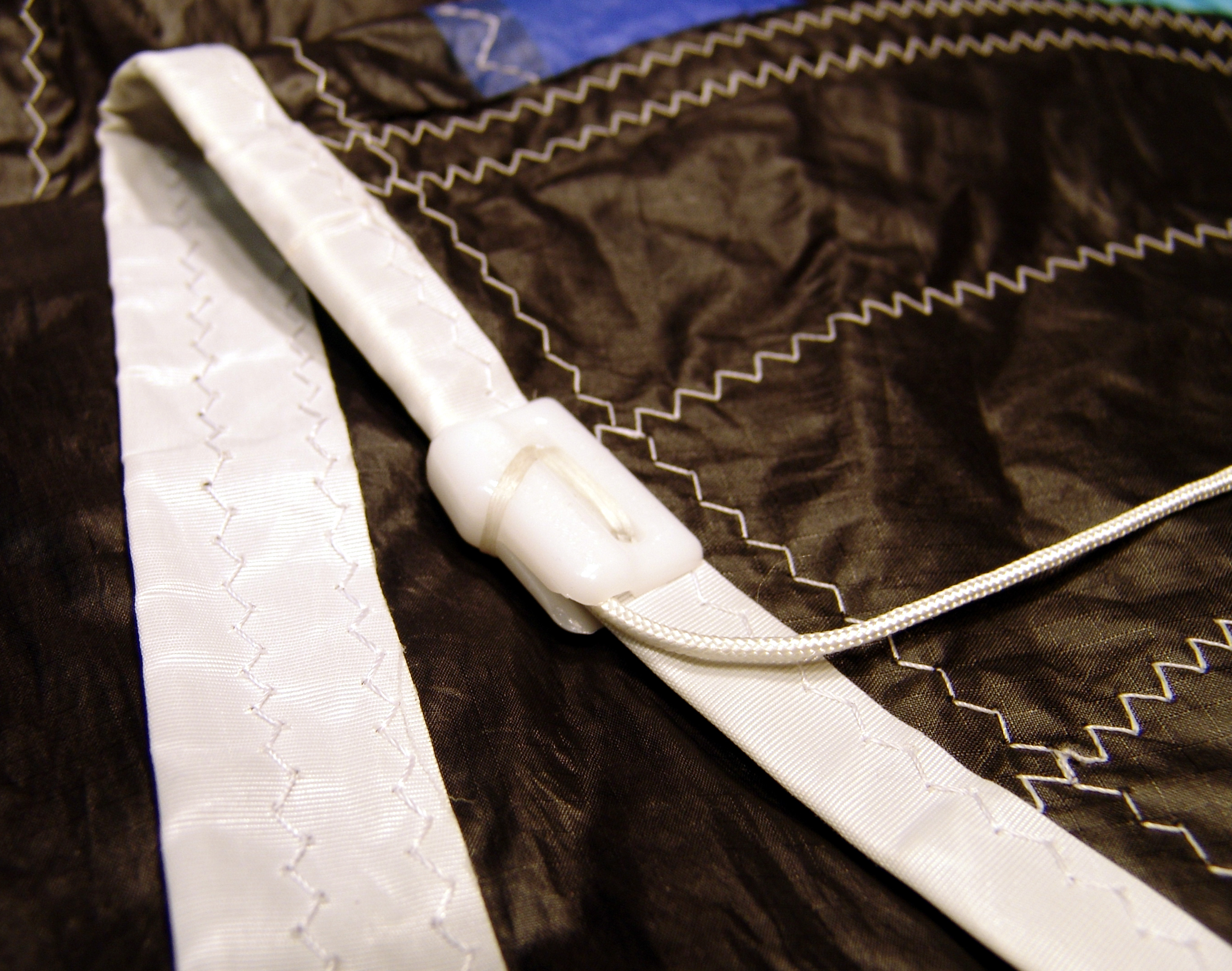
Leech line with jam cleat to control the tension on the leach of a sail

Modern sails may come with a standard leech line (leech control) that runs under the back edge of the mainsail. This line is usually fixed at the head of the sail, and the other end can be cleated near the clew of the sail. In strong winds, particularly when sailing upwind, the leach of the sail may begin to flutter. Tightening the leach line will prevent that. Care must be taken not to introduce a curl into the leach by tightening the line too much.

According to the MIT Nautical Association, a leechline can refer to either a thin line running through the leech of a sail that can be tensioned or slacked, or a small piece of yarn or a thin strip of material sewn into the leech of a sail to allow a sailor to visualize airflow.
