= Bruce Kirby (yacht designer) =

Canadian yacht racer and designer (1929–2021)

Bruce Robert William Kirby, CM (2 January 1929 – 19 July 2021) was a Canadian-born sailboat designer, dinghy and offshore racer and journalist. His designs spanned in size from the single-handed Laser dinghy to the 12-meter class Louis Vuitton Cup yacht, Canada One. He continued his design work in his American company, Bruce Kirby Marine.

== Career ==
Kirby was born in Ottawa. A Canadian newspaperman and former editor of Yacht Racing (predecessor to Sailing World), he designed the Laser in 1969. Kirby started as a reporter in Montreal before editing Yacht Racing and, in his spare time, taking up yacht design and drawing the Laser. In 1970 Kirby became editor of Yacht Racing, where he stayed until 1975.

Kirby's career began with the International 14 class, a developmental skiff with relatively few rules. Kirby designed several International 14s, winning the world championships in 1958 and 1961. Kirby also represented Canada at the Olympic regattas in 1956 and 1964, sailing Finns, and in a Star in 1968.

Kirby's most widely recognized contribution to the sport of sailing was his design of the Laser dinghy.

Starting in the 1970s, Kirby designed two America's Cup 12-Meters, Canada One and Canada II, the Apollo, Sonar, Blazer 23, Kirby 25, and Kirby 30, Ideal 18, and the Pixel, a double-handed trainer that replaced the Blue Jay on Long Island Sound. The San Juan 24 was extremely successful, with over a thousand built since its debut. Designed to the IOR rating, it was the basis for many of Kirby's later offshore designs. Kirby also served as both designer and skipper on Runaway, one of three yachts in Canada's 1981 Admiral's Cup campaign.

Kirby designed Norwalk Islands Sharpies, a line of high powered, shallow-draft sailboats from 18 ft. to 41 ft. The designs use modern plywood, fiberglass and epoxy construction. The Sonar is the largest of three classes used in Paralympic sailing. Kirby was also part of the international committee elected to create the IACC boats (International America's Cup Class) used in the America's Cup between 1992 in San Diego and 2007 in Valencia, Spain.

== Recognition ==
Kirby was inducted into the National Sailing Hall of Fame in 2012.

In 2017, he was named as a Member of the Order of Canada and later was invested into the Order of Canada for his contributions to the sport of sailing.

He was in the first induction of the Lisgar Collegiate Institute Athletic Wall of Fame, as part of the 160th Anniversary celebrations.

== Boats ==
Boats designed by Kirby include:

- AMF Apollo 16
- Blazer 23
- DS-22
- Fox 18 (keelboat)
- Ideal 18
- Iota (dinghy)
- Kirby 1/4 T
- Kirby 23
- Kirby 25
- Kirby 30
- Kirby 36
- Kirby 8M
- Kirby Torch
- Laser (dinghy)
- Laser 4.7
- Laser 13
- Laser Radial
- Mirage 30SX
- Mystic Mini-Ton
- Nightwind 35
- North Castle 30
- Pixel (dinghy)
- San Juan 23
- San Juan 23-2
- San Juan 24
- San Juan 30
- Seidelmann 24
- Sonar (keelboat)
- Ticon 34
- Trapper 300
- Trinka 12
- Vision 660
