= Genoa (sail) =

Type of large jib or staysail

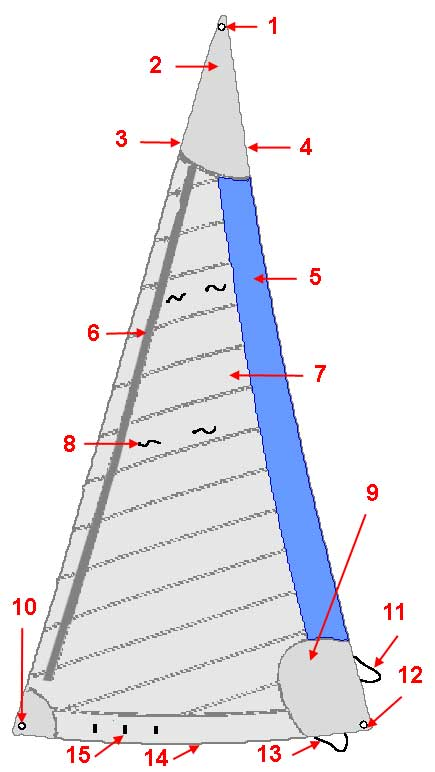
Genoa: 2 – Reinforcement 5 – Anti-UV covering 6 – Head foil attachment 7 – Panel(s) 8 – Telltales 9 – Reinforcement 11 – Leech line 13 – Foot control 15 – Furling marks Edges: 3 – Luff 4 – Leech 14 – Foot Corners: 1 – Head 10 – Tack 12 – Clew

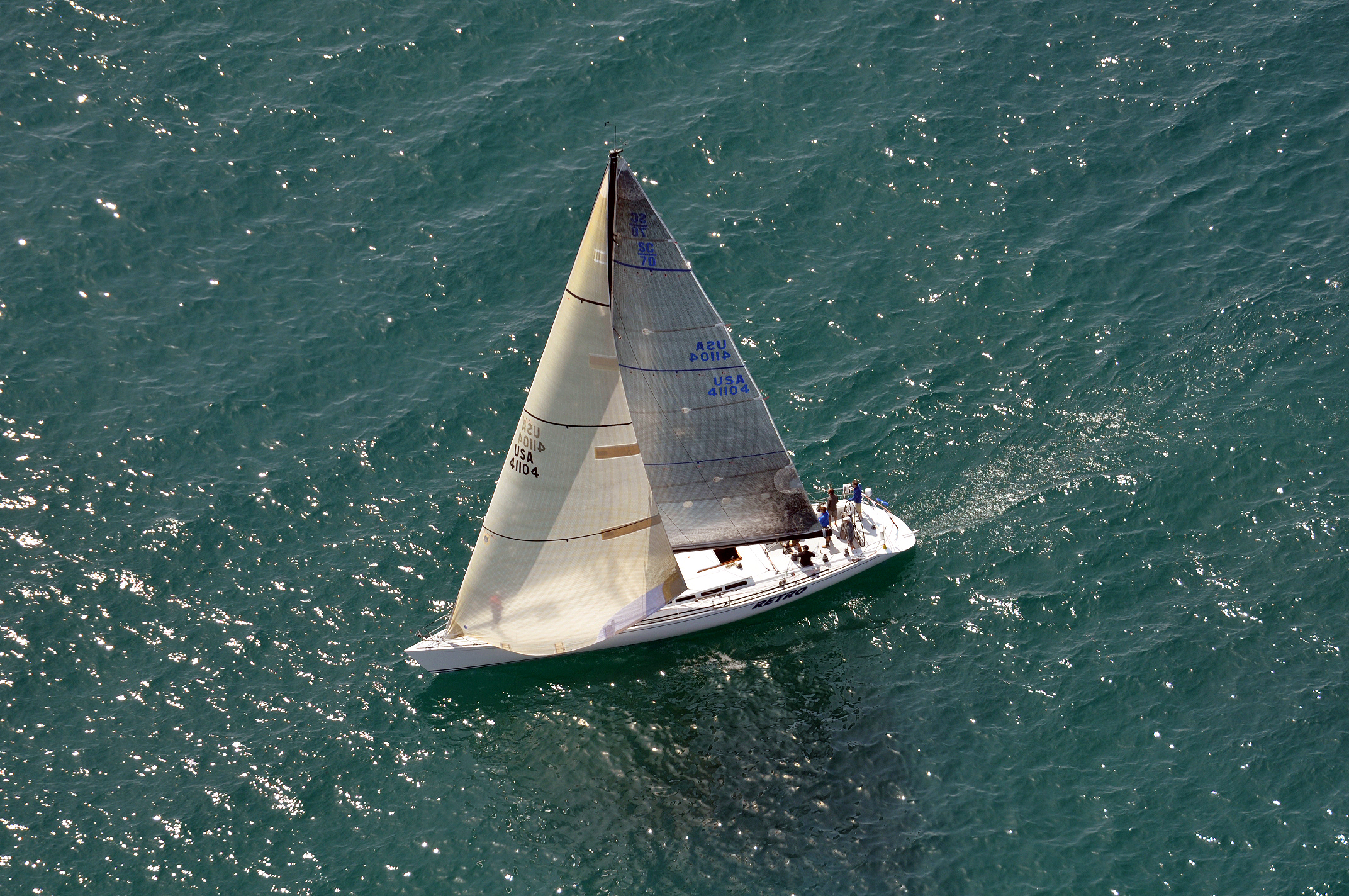
SC70 RETRO's genoa overlaps the main sail and the mast

A genoa sail is a type of large jib or staysail that extends past the mast and so overlaps the main sail when viewed from the side, sometimes eliminating it. It was originally called an "overlapping jib" and later a genoa jib. It is used on single-masted sloops and twin-masted boats such as yawls and ketches. Its larger surface area increases the speed of the craft in light to moderate winds; in high wind, a smaller jib is usually substituted, and downwind a spinnaker may be used.

== Definition ==
A jib, left, compared to a roughly 110% genoa, right. The foretriangle is outlined in red.

The term jib is the generic term for any of an assortment of headsails. The term genoa (or genny) refers to a type of jib that is larger than 100% of the foretriangle, which is the triangular area formed by the point at which the stay intersects the mast, and deck or bowsprit, and the line where the mast intersects deck at the rail. Colloquially the term is sometimes used interchangeably with jib. A working jib is no larger than 100% of the foretriangle. A genoa is larger, with the leech going past the mast and overlapping the mainsail. To maximize sail area, the foot of the sail is generally parallel and very close to the deck when close hauled.

Genoas are categorized by a percentage representing their area relative to 100% of the foretriangle. Sail racing classes often specify a limit to genoa size. Genoas are classified by their size; a modern number 1 genoa would typically be approximately 155%, but historically number 1 genoas have been as large as 180%. Number 2 genoas are generally in the range of 125–140%. Working jibs are also defined by the same measure, typically 100% or less of the foretriangle. Under Performance Handicap Racing Fleet rules, most boats are allowed 155% genoas without a penalty.

== Handling issues ==
Maximizing the sail area can cause more difficult handling. It may be harder to tack a genoa than a jib, since the overlapping area can become fouled among the shrouds and/or mast unless carefully tended during the tack. Genoas are very popular in some racing classes, since they count only the foretriangle area when calculating foresail size; a genoa allows a significant increase in actual sail area within the calculated sail area. In boats where sail restrictions do not apply, genoas of 180% overlap can be found, although those over 150% are rare because the additional area is shadowed by the mainsail when close hauled and generates diminishing returns in terms of power per actual sail area.

== The gennaker ==
The gennaker is a hybrid between a genoa and a symmetrical spinnaker. A brand name of North Sails, the gennaker started as a cruising sail based on the Code 0 spinnakers used on racing boats. Gennakers and similar code 0 variants offered by other makers are even larger than genoas (200% overlaps are not uncommon), and they have a much greater camber for generating larger amounts of lift when reaching. Flat-cut gennakers can be effective for angles as low as 60–70 degrees. Spinnakers perform much better when running because the main sail blocks the wind of gennaker above 135–150 degrees.

== History ==
The famous Swedish sailor and shipowner Sven Salén (1890–1969) first used the genoa on his 6 m R-yacht May-Be by the 1926 in Coppa del Tirreno in Genoa, hence the name. He successfully used it during the Scandinavian Gold Cup's races of 1927 in Oyster Bay (US). Sven Salén also pioneered the parachute spinnacre.

A similar type of jib was in use for centuries by the fishermen in the Netherlands with their Botter type ships. The fishermen relied on the combination of a large jib while fishing so the mainsail could remain unused. After fishing the fisherman's jib helped to get the fish to markets fast.

A correct explanation of the interaction between jib and mainsail was published by aerodynamicist and yachtsman Arvel Gentry in 1981, and "is much more complicated than the old theories imply". This states that the widely believed explanation of the slot effect is "completely wrong" and shows that this is not due to the venturi effect (or "valve effect" to use Curry's term) accelerating the air in the slot. Instead it is shown that the air in the slot is slowed and its pressure increased reducing the tendency of the mainsail to stall, that the mainsail reduces the air pressure on the lee side of the jib accelerating that airflow, and that the mainsail increases the angle at which the air meets the luff of the jib, allowing the boat to point higher. Gentry points out that proper understanding of sail interaction allows better sail trimming.
