= US Yachts US 30 =

Sailboat class

Development
- Designer: Doug Peterson and Daryl Watson
- Location: United States
- Year: 1979
- Builder: US Yachts
- Name: US Yachts US 30

Boat
- Displacement: 7,000 lb (3,175 kg)
- Draft: 5.58 ft (1.70 m)

Hull
- Type: monohull
- Construction: fiberglass
- LOA: 29.92 ft (9.12 m)
- LWL: 25.00 ft (7.62 m)
- Beam: 10.25 ft (3.12 m)
- Engine: Volvo 13 hp (10 kW) diesel engine

Hull appendages
- Keel: fin keel
- Ballast: 2,850 lb (1,293 kg)
- Rudder: internally-mounted spade-type rudder

Rig
- Rig type: Bermuda rig
- I foretriangle height: 38.86 ft (11.84 m)
- J foretriangle base: 12.32 ft (3.76 m)
- P mainsail luff: 34.00 ft (10.36 m)
- E mainsail foot: 9.17 ft (2.80 m)

Sails
- Sailplan: masthead sloop
- Mainsail area: 155.89 sq ft (14.483 m^{2})
- Jib/genoa area: 239.38 sq ft (22.239 m^{2})
- Total sail area: 395.27 sq ft (36.722 m^{2})

The US Yachts US 30 is an American sailboat that was designed by Doug Peterson and Daryl Watson and first built in 1979.

The design is an unauthorized development of Peterson's International Offshore Rule Half Ton class Chaser 29 racer, using the same hull design, but with no royalties paid. The US 30 molds were later sold to Pearson Yachts and developed into the Triton 30. Sailboatdata notes of US Yachts that, "the sailboat division of Bayliner took the practice of reusing the tooling from defunct builders to a whole new level."

== Production ==
The design was built by US Yachts in the United States, from 1979 until 1983, but it is now out of production.

== Design ==
The US Yachts US 30 is a recreational keelboat, built predominantly of fiberglass, with wood trim. It has a masthead sloop rig, a raked stem, a reverse transom, an internally mounted spade-type rudder controlled by a wheel and a fixed fin keel. It displaces 7,000 lb (3,175 kg) and carries 2,850 lb (1,293 kg) of ballast.

The boat has a draft of 5.58 ft (1.70 m) with the standard keel and 3.92 ft (1.19 m) with the optional shoal draft keel.

The boat is fitted with a Swedish Volvo diesel engine of 13 hp (10 kW) for docking and maneuvering. The fuel tank holds 20 U.S. gallons (76 L; 17 imp gal) and the fresh water tank has a capacity of 29 U.S. gallons (110 L; 24 imp gal).

The design has sleeping accommodation for four people, with a double "V"-berth in the bow cabin and a drop-down dinette table and U-shaped settee that forms a double berth on the port side. The galley is located on the starboard side of the companionway ladder. The galley is L-shaped and is equipped with a two-burner stove, ice box and a sink. The head is located just aft of the bow cabin on the port side. Cabin headroom is 74 in (188 cm).

For sailing the design may be equipped with one of a number of jibs or genoas.

The design has a hull speed of 6.7 kn (12.4 km/h).

== See also ==
- List of sailing boat types
