= Ranger 24 =

Sailboat class

Development
- Designer: Raymond H. Richards
- Location: United States
- Year: 1974
- Builder: Ranger Fiberglass Boats
- Role: Racer-Cruiser
- Name: Ranger 24

Boat
- Displacement: 3,140 lb (1,424 kg)
- Draft: 4.00 ft (1.22 m)

Hull
- Type: monohull
- Construction: fiberglass
- LOA: 23.92 ft (7.29 m)
- LWL: 20.00 ft (6.10 m)
- Beam: 8.33 ft (2.54 m)
- Engine: outboard motor

Hull appendages
- Keel: fin keel
- Ballast: 1,400 lb (635 kg)
- Rudder: transom-mounted rudder

Rig
- Rig type: Bermuda rig
- I foretriangle height: 29.00 ft (8.84 m)
- J foretriangle base: 10.00 ft (3.05 m)
- P mainsail luff: 25.00 ft (7.62 m)
- E mainsail foot: 7.50 ft (2.29 m)

Sails
- Sailplan: masthead sloop
- Mainsail area: 93.75 sq ft (8.710 m^{2})
- Jib/genoa area: 145.00 sq ft (13.471 m^{2})
- Total sail area: 238.75 sq ft (22.181 m^{2})

Racing
- PHRF: 216

The Ranger 24 is an International Offshore Rule Quarter Ton class sailboat built by Ranger Fiberglass Boats in Kent, Washington, United States (not to be confused with Ranger Yachts), starting in 1974, but it is now out of production.

== Design ==
The Ranger 24 is a recreational keelboat, built predominantly of fiberglass, with wood trim. The hull has a single hard chine and positive flotation, making the boat unsinkable. It has a masthead sloop rig, a raked stem, a plumb transom, a transom-hung rudder controlled by a tiller and a fixed swept fin keel. It displaces 3,150 lb (1,429 kg) and carries 1,400 lb (635 kg) of lead ballast.

The boat has a draft of 4.00 ft (1.22 m) with the standard keel.

The boat is normally fitted with a small 3 to 6 hp (2 to 4 kW) outboard motor mounted in centerline well, for docking and maneuvering.

The design has sleeping accommodation for four people. The galley is located on the port side just forward of the companionway ladder. The galley may be optionally equipped with a gimballed stove and oven, and a refrigerator. Cabin headroom is 67 in (170 cm).

For sailing the design is may be equipped with one of a series of jibs or genoas.

The design has a PHRF racing average handicap of 216 and a hull speed of 5.0 kn (9.3 km/h).

== Reception ==
In a 2010 review Steve Henkel wrote, "designer Ray Richards of Seattle drew this quarter ton racer-cruiser for Howard 'Smitty' Smith, owner of Ranger Fiberglass Boats of nearby Kent, WA. The boat is unusual in several ways. First, her topsides, though constructed of fiberglass, appear to be made of two panels of flat plywood bent to her sheer, giving her the look of hard-chine plywood vessel. Second, though only 24-feet long, her sales brochure says that her sizable galley can accommodate 'both a refrigerator and a gimballed range with oven.' (We doubt many boats sold had either convenience, especially the refrigerator, which would require frequent charging of the batteries.) Third, she has full flotation, rare in a boat this size. Best features: Her outboard motor well is placed on her centerline, forward of the rudder in the cockpit, giving good access to the helmsman and, because the prop wash immediately impacts the rudderblade, good control at slow speeds around dock or mooring. Worst features: That 'hard-chine' look will not appeal to everyone: it's not obvious why it is necessary."
