= C&C 1/2 Ton =

Sailboat class

Development
- Designer: C&C Design
- Location: Canada
- Year: 1975
- Builder: C&C Yachts
- Name: C&C 1/2 Ton

Boat
- Displacement: 6,400 lb (2,903 kg)
- Draft: 5.33 ft (1.62 m)

Hull
- Type: Monohull
- Construction: Fiberglass
- LOA: 30.42 ft (9.27 m)
- LWL: 24.33 ft (7.42 m)
- Beam: 10.80 ft (3.29 m)

Hull appendages
- Keel: fin keel
- Rudder: internally-mounted spade-type rudder

Rig
- General: Masthead sloop
- I foretriangle height: 39.00 ft (11.89 m)
- J foretriangle base: 11.75 ft (3.58 m)
- P mainsail luff: 34.00 ft (10.36 m)
- E mainsail foot: 9.30 ft (2.83 m)

Sails
- Mainsail area: 158.10 sq ft (14.688 m^{2})
- Jib/genoa area: 229.13 sq ft (21.287 m^{2})
- Total sail area: 387.23 sq ft (35.975 m^{2})

Racing
- PHRF: 165 (average)

The C&C 1/2 Ton is a Canadian sailboat, that was designed by C&C Design as an International Offshore Rule Half Ton class racer.

The C&C 1/2 Ton design was the basis for the C&C 29 of 1977.

== Production ==
The boat was built by C&C Yachts in Canada as a made-to-order, semi-custom built limited edition boat between 1975 and 1980, with only 12 examples completed, but it is now out of production.

== Design ==
The C&C 1/2 Ton is a small racing keelboat, built predominantly of fiberglass, with wood trim. It has a masthead sloop rig, an internally-mounted spade-type rudder and a fixed fin keel. It displaces 6,400 lb (2,903 kg).

The boat has a draft of 5.33 ft (1.62 m) with the standard keel.

The boat has a PHRF racing average handicap of 165 with a high of 165 and low of 168. It has a hull speed of 6.61 kn (12.24 km/h).

== Operational history ==
The boat is support by an active class club, the Half-Ton Class.

The first boat delivered was named SuperStar and sailed by Hans Fogh to 7th place in the 1/2 Ton Cup races held at Trieste, Italy in 1976.

== See also ==
- List of sailing boat types
