= Santana 525 =

Sailboat class

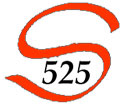

Development
- Designer: W. Shad Turner
- Location: United States
- Year: 1977
- No. built: 261
- Builder: W. D. Schock Corp
- Role: Racer-Cruiser

Boat
- Displacement: 2,400 lb (1,089 kg)
- Draft: 4.25 ft (1.30 m)

Hull
- Type: monohull
- Construction: fiberglass
- LOA: 24.58 ft (7.49 m)
- LWL: 18.50 ft (5.64 m)
- Beam: 9.33 ft (2.84 m)
- Engine: outboard motor

Hull appendages
- Keel: fin keel
- Ballast: 950 lb (431 kg)
- Rudder: internally-mounted spade-type rudder

Rig
- Rig type: Bermuda rig
- I foretriangle height: 26.50 ft (8.08 m)
- J foretriangle base: 8.75 ft (2.67 m)
- P mainsail luff: 29.00 ft (8.84 m)
- E mainsail foot: 10.00 ft (3.05 m)

Sails
- Sailplan: fractional rigged sloop
- Mainsail area: 145.00 sq ft (13.471 m^{2})
- Jib/genoa area: 115.94 sq ft (10.771 m^{2})
- Total sail area: 260.94 sq ft (24.242 m^{2})

Racing
- PHRF: 186

The Santana 525 is an American sailboat that was designed by W. Shad Turner as a one design and International Offshore Rule Quarter Ton class racer-cruiser and first built in 1977.

== Production ==
The design was built by W. D. Schock Corp in the United States, between 1977 and 1982, with 261 boats completed, but it is now out of production.

== Design ==
The Santana 525 is a racing keelboat, built predominantly of fiberglass, with wood trim. It has a fractional sloop rig, a raked stem, a reverse transom, an internally mounted spade-type rudder controlled by a tiller and a fixed fin keel. It displaces 2,400 lb (1,089 kg) and carries 950 lb (431 kg) of ballast.

The boat has a draft of 4.25 ft (1.30 m) with the standard keel and is normally fitted with a small outboard motor for docking and maneuvering.

The design has sleeping accommodation for four people, with a double "V"-berth in the bow cabin and a two straight settee berths in the main cabin. The galley is located on both sides of the companionway ladder. The head is located in the bow cabin, centered under the "V"-berth.

For sailing the design may be equipped with one of a number of jibs and genoas. For sailing downwind the design may be equipped with a symmetrical spinnaker of 209 sq ft (19.4 m^{2}).

The design has a typical PHRF racing average handicap of 186 and a hull speed of 5.76 kn (10.67 km/h).

== Operational history ==
The boat is supported by an active class club that organizes racing events, the Santana 525 One Design Class Association.

The largest fleet of Santana 525s is in Kelowna, British Columbia, Canada.

== See also ==
- List of sailing boat types
