= Mirage 5.5 =

1975 US sailboat

Development
- Designer: Ken Fickett
- Location: United States
- Year: 1975
- No. built: 550
- Builder: Mirage Manufacturing
- Role: Racer
- Name: Mirage 5.5

Boat
- Displacement: 1,200 lb (544 kg)
- Draft: 5.33 ft (1.62 m) with swing keel down

Hull
- Type: monohull
- Construction: fiberglass
- LOA: 20.00 ft (6.10 m)
- LWL: 17.33 ft (5.28 m)
- Beam: 8.00 ft (2.44 m)
- Engine: outboard motor

Hull appendages
- Keel: swing keel
- Ballast: 320 lb (145 kg)
- Rudder: transom-mounted rudder

Rig
- Rig type: Bermuda rig
- I foretriangle height: 26.08 ft (7.95 m)
- J foretriangle base: 8.25 ft (2.51 m)
- P mainsail luff: 22.50 ft (6.86 m)
- E mainsail foot: 7.25 ft (2.21 m)

Sails
- Sailplan: masthead sloop
- Mainsail area: 81.56 sq ft (7.577 m^{2})
- Jib/genoa area: 107.58 sq ft (9.995 m^{2})
- Total sail area: 189.14 sq ft (17.572 m^{2})

Racing
- PHRF: 240

The Mirage 5.5 is a sailboat that was designed by Ken Fickett as an International Offshore Rule Mini Ton class racer and first built in 1975.

== Production ==
The design was built by Mirage Manufacturing, founded by designer Ken Fickett in Gainesville, Florida, United States. The boat was produced from 1975 until 1983, with 550 boats completed, but it is now out of production.

== Design ==
The Mirage 5.5 is a racing keelboat, built predominantly of fiberglass, with wood trim. It has a masthead sloop rig; a raked stem; a reverse transom; a transom-hung, lifting rudder controlled by a tiller and a retractable swing keel. It displaces 1,200 lb (544 kg) and carries 360 lb (163 kg) of ballast.

The boat has a draft of 5.33 ft (1.62 m) with the keel extended and 1.33 ft (0.41 m) with it retracted, allowing operation in shallow water, beaching or ground transportation on a trailer.

The boat is normally fitted with a small 2 to 4 hp (1 to 3 kW) outboard motor for docking and maneuvering.

The design has sleeping accommodation for four people, with a double "V"-berth in the bow cabin and two straight settee berths in the main cabin. The galley is located on the starboard side aft of the bow cabin. The galley is equipped with sink. There are no provisions for a head. Cabin headroom is 36 in (91 cm).

The design has a PHRF racing average handicap of 240 and a hull speed of 5.6 kn (10.4 km/h).

== Reception ==
In a 2010 review Steve Henkel wrote, "The ad copy (in 1987) said that this is 'a roomy small cruiser that can be easily trailerered and rigged ... should perform well in light wind ... built and equipped with the best materials available and modestly priced.' We would argue with the word 'roomy' and perhaps the word 'cruiser,' but the rest sounds plausible; we see her as a pure racer. She is named the '5.5' presumably in meters, but that's eighteen feet, which is neither the waterline length nor the LOD nor the LOA. Go figure. Best features: The swing keel on the '5.5' seems to us to be more manageable than the lifting keels on both her comp[etitor]s [the Hotfoot 20 and the Holder 20]. She features a galley and sink in a cabin with more elbow room —but with headroom of only three feet, who would want to stay below to cook? Her fittings (Harken, Barient, North) are all top-of-the-line, and she comes as standard with internal halyards, boom vang, 3:1 outhaul, cunningham, jiffy reefing, and a perforated toerail. Worst features: With performance numbers so close to her comp[etitor]s, we question why her PHRF would be 240 versus 168 and 183 for the other two comp[etitor]s. That could be considered as a 'plus' to some. but for those who don't want their race course buddies to shun them, maybe it should be counted as a 'minus.'"
