= Triton 27 =

Sailboat class

Development
- Designer: Doug Peterson
- Location: United States
- Year: 1984
- Builder: Pearson Yachts
- Name: Triton 27

Boat
- Displacement: 6,250 lb (2,835 kg)
- Draft: 5.16 ft (1.57 m)

Hull
- Type: monohull
- Construction: fiberglass
- LOA: 27.00 ft (8.23 m)
- LWL: 23.25 ft (7.09 m)
- Beam: 9.50 ft (2.90 m)

Hull appendages
- Keel: fin keel
- Ballast: 2,024 lb (918 kg)
- Rudder: internally-mounted spade-type rudder

Rig
- Rig type: Bermuda rig
- I foretriangle height: 32.75 ft (9.98 m)
- J foretriangle base: 10.75 ft (3.28 m)
- P mainsail luff: 28.00 ft (8.53 m)
- E mainsail foot: 9.75 ft (2.97 m)

Sails
- Sailplan: masthead sloop
- Mainsail area: 136.50 sq ft (12.681 m^{2})
- Jib/genoa area: 176.03 sq ft (16.354 m^{2})
- Total sail area: 312.53 sq ft (29.035 m^{2})

The Triton 27, also called the Pearson 27, is an American sailboat that was designed by Doug Peterson and first built in 1984.

The design is an unauthorized development of Peterson's International Offshore Rule Half Ton class Chaser 29 racer, using the same hull design. The molds had been owned by US Yachts, a division of Bayliner, to build the US Yachts US 27 and were sold to Pearson Yachts.

== Production ==
The design was built by Pearson Yachts in the United States, starting in 1984 and renamed the Pearson 27 in 1986. The boat was only built in small numbers and is now out of production.

== Design ==
The Triton 27 is a recreational keelboat, built predominantly of fiberglass, with wood trim. It has a masthead sloop rig, a raked stem, a reverse transom, an internally mounted spade-type rudder controlled by a wheel and a fixed fin keel or optional shoal draft keel. It displaces 6,250 lb (2,835 kg) and carries 2,024 lb (918 kg) of ballast.

The boat has a draft of 5.16 ft (1.57 m) with the standard keel and 3.92 ft (1.19 m) with the optional shoal draft keel.

The design has a hull speed of 6.46 kn (11.96 km/h).

== See also ==
- List of sailing boat types
