= US Yachts US 33 =

Sailboat class

Development
- Designer: Doug Peterson
- Location: United States
- Year: 1981
- Builder: US Yachts
- Role: Racer-Cruiser
- Name: US Yachts US 33

Boat
- Displacement: 9,300 lb (4,218 kg)
- Draft: 5.50 ft (1.68 m)

Hull
- Type: monohull
- Construction: fiberglass
- LOA: 32.83 ft (10.01 m)
- LWL: 26.50 ft (8.08 m)
- Beam: 10.50 ft (3.20 m)
- Engine: Volvo 13 hp (10 kW) diesel engine

Hull appendages
- Keel: fin keel
- Ballast: 4,600 lb (2,087 kg)
- Rudder: internally-mounted spade-type

Rig
- Rig type: Bermuda rig
- I foretriangle height: 42.96 ft (13.09 m)
- J foretriangle base: 13.83 ft (4.22 m)
- P mainsail luff: 38.00 ft (11.58 m)
- E mainsail foot: 10.28 ft (3.13 m)

Sails
- Sailplan: fractional rigged sloop masthead sloop
- Mainsail area: 195.32 sq ft (18.146 m^{2})
- Jib/genoa area: 297.07 sq ft (27.599 m^{2})
- Total sail area: 492.67 sq ft (45.771 m^{2})

The US Yachts US 33 is an American sailboat that was designed by Doug Peterson as a racer-cruiser and first built in 1981.

The US Yachts US 33 is an unauthorized development of Peterson's International Offshore Rule Three-Quarter Ton class Chaser 33 racer, using the same hull design from the original molds and a new deck, but with no royalties paid.

== Production ==
The design was built by US Yachts in the United States, between 1981 and 1983, but it is now out of production.

== Design ==
The US Yachts US 33 is a recreational keelboat, built predominantly of fiberglass, with wood trim. It has a masthead sloop rig, a raked stem, a reverse transom, an internally mounted spade-type rudder controlled by a wheel and a fixed fin keel. It displaces 9,300 lb (4,218 kg) and carries 4,600 lb (2,087 kg) of ballast.

The boat has a draft of 5.50 ft (1.68 m) with the standard keel.

The boat is fitted with a Swedish Volvo diesel engine of 13 hp (10 kW) for docking and maneuvering. The fuel tank holds 20 U.S. gallons (76 L; 17 imp gal) and the fresh water tank has a capacity of 29 U.S. gallons (110 L; 24 imp gal).

The design has sleeping accommodation for six people, with a double "V"-berth in the bow cabin, a V-shaped settee in the main cabin and an aft cabin with a double berth on the port side. The galley is located on the port side amidships and is equipped with a two-burner stove and a double sink. The head is located next to the companionway steps, on the starboard side. Cabin headroom is 74 in (188 cm).

The design has a hull speed of 6.9 kn (12.8 km/h).

== See also ==
- List of sailing boat types
