= US Yachts US 29 =

Sailboat class

Development
- Designer: Doug Peterson
- Location: United States
- Year: 1977
- Builder: US Yachts
- Role: Racer-Cruiser
- Name: US Yachts US 29

Boat
- Displacement: 7,000 lb (3,175 kg)
- Draft: 5.58 ft (1.70 m)

Hull
- Type: monohull
- Construction: fiberglass
- LOA: 29.50 ft (8.99 m)
- LWL: 22.42 ft (6.83 m)
- Beam: 10.25 ft (3.12 m)
- Engine: Volvo MD7 diesel engine

Hull appendages
- Keel: fin keel
- Ballast: 2,850 lb (1,293 kg)
- Rudder: internally-mounted spade-type

Rig
- Rig type: Bermuda rig
- I foretriangle height: 38.86 ft (11.84 m)
- J foretriangle base: 12.32 ft (3.76 m)
- P mainsail luff: 34.00 ft (10.36 m)
- E mainsail foot: 9.17 ft (2.80 m)

Sails
- Sailplan: masthead sloop
- Mainsail area: 155.89 sq ft (14.483 m^{2})
- Jib/genoa area: 239.38 sq ft (22.239 m^{2})
- Total sail area: 395.27 sq ft (36.722 m^{2})

The US Yachts US 29 is an American sailboat that was designed by Doug Peterson as a racer-cruiser and first built in 1977.

The design is an unauthorized development of Peterson's International Offshore Rule Half Ton class Chaser 29 racer. The US 29 molds were later sold to Pearson Yachts and developed into the Triton 30 in 1985.

== Production ==
The design was built by US Yachts in the United States, starting in 1977, but it is now out of production.

== Design ==
The US 29 is a recreational keelboat, built predominantly of fiberglass, with wood trim. It has a masthead sloop rig, a raked stem, a reverse transom, an internally mounted spade-type rudder controlled by a wheel and a fixed fin keel. It displaces 7,000 lb (3,175 kg) and carries 2,850 lb (1,293 kg) of ballast.

The boat has a draft of 5.58 ft (1.70 m) with the standard keel.

The boat is fitted with a Swedish Volvo MD7 diesel engine for docking and maneuvering. The fuel tank holds 15 U.S. gallons (57 L; 12 imp gal) and the fresh water tank has a capacity of 20 U.S. gallons (76 L; 17 imp gal).

The design has a hull speed of 6.34 kn (11.74 km/h).

== See also ==
- List of sailing boat types
