= Yankee 26 =

IOR Quarter Ton class racing sailboat

Development
- Designer: Sparkman & Stephens
- Location: United States
- Year: 1974
- Builders: Yankee Yachts; Heritage Yacht Company; Heritage Boatworks
- Role: Racer-Cruiser
- Name: Yankee 26

Boat
- Displacement: 5,335 lb (2,420 kg)
- Draft: 4.75 ft (1.45 m)

Hull
- Type: monohull
- Construction: fiberglass
- LOA: 26.00 ft (7.92 m)
- LWL: 20.67 ft (6.30 m)
- Beam: 8.67 ft (2.64 m)
- Engine: BMW 8 hp (6 kW) diesel engine

Hull appendages
- Keel: fin keel
- Ballast: 2,150 lb (975 kg)
- Rudder: skeg-mounted rudder

Rig
- Rig type: Bermuda rig
- I foretriangle height: 33.50 ft (10.21 m)
- J foretriangle base: 10.30 ft (3.14 m)
- P mainsail luff: 28.30 ft (8.63 m)
- E mainsail foot: 9.00 ft (2.74 m)

Sails
- Sailplan: masthead sloop
- Mainsail area: 127.35 sq ft (11.831 m^{2})
- Jib/genoa area: 172.53 sq ft (16.029 m^{2})
- Total sail area: 299.88 sq ft (27.860 m^{2})

Racing
- PHRF: 234

The Yankee 26 is an International Offshore Rule Quarter Ton class sailboat built from 1974 to 1990.

== Design ==
Designed by Sparkman & Stephens the fiberglass hull a raked stem, a raised counter, a reverse transom, a skeg-mounted rudder controlled by a tiller and a fixed fin keel. It displaces 5,335 lb (2,420 kg) and carries 2,150 lb (975 kg) of ballast.

The boat has a draft of 4.75 ft (1.45 m) with the standard keel.

The boat has a BMW diesel engine of 8 hp (6 kW). The fuel tank holds 15 U.S. gallons (57 L; 12 imp gal), and the freshwater tank also has a capacity of 15 U.S. gallons (57 L; 12 imp gal).

The design has sleeping accommodation for four people, with a double "V"-berth in the bow cabin, a U-shaped settee in the main cabin and an aft quarter berth on the port side. The galley is located on the port side just forward of the companionway ladder. The galley has a two-burner stove, an ice box and a sink. The enclosed head is located opposite the galley on the starboard side. The cabin headroom is 74 in (188 cm).

The design has a PHRF racing average handicap of 234 and a hull speed of 6.1 kn (11.3 km/h).

It has a masthead sloop tall rig.
