= Symphonie 32 =

Sailboat class

Development
- Designer: Philippe Briand
- Location: France
- Year: 1978
- No. built: 367
- Builder: Jeanneau
- Role: Cruiser
- Name: Symphonie 32

Boat
- Displacement: 9,800 lb (4,445 kg)
- Draft: 6.16 ft (1.88 m)

Hull
- Type: monohull
- Construction: fiberglass
- LOA: 32.00 ft (9.75 m)
- LWL: 26.75 ft (8.15 m)
- Beam: 10.75 ft (3.28 m)
- Engine: Yanmar 16 or 24 hp (12 or 18 kW) diesel engine

Hull appendages
- Keel: fin keel
- Ballast: 4,410 lb (2,000 kg)
- Rudder: spade-type rudder

Rig
- Rig type: Bermuda rig
- I foretriangle height: 42.16 ft (12.85 m)
- J foretriangle base: 13.45 ft (4.10 m)
- P mainsail luff: 36.58 ft (11.15 m)
- E mainsail foot: 10.66 ft (3.25 m)

Sails
- Sailplan: masthead sloop
- Mainsail area: 212 sq ft (19.7 m^{2})
- Jib/genoa area: 274 sq ft (25.5 m^{2})
- Spinnaker area: 969 sq ft (90.0 m^{2})
- Other sails: genoa: 446 sq ft (41.4 m^{2})
- Upwind sail area: 658 sq ft (61.1 m^{2})
- Downwind sail area: 1,180 sq ft (110 m^{2})

The Symphonie 32, or just Symphonie, is a French sailboat that was designed by Philippe Briand as a cruiser and first built in 1979.

The design is based on a prototype International Offshore Rule Three-Quarter Ton class racer.

== Production ==
The design was built by Jeanneau in France, from 1978 to 1984 with 367 boats completed, but it is now out of production.

== Design ==
The Symphonie 32 is a recreational keelboat, built predominantly of fiberglass, with wood trim. The hull is single skin polyester fiberglass, while the deck is balsa-cored polyester fiberglass. The boat has a masthead sloop rig, with a deck-stepped mast, a single set of spreaders and aluminum spars with continuous stainless steel wire rigging. The hull has a raked stem; a reverse transom; an internally mounted spade-type rudder controlled by a tiller and a fixed, deep draft fin keel, a shoal draft keel or keel and retractable steel centerboard. It displaces 9,800 lb (4,445 kg) and carries 4,410 lb (2,000 kg) of exterior cast iron ballast.

The deep draft keel-equipped version of the boat has a draft of 6.16 ft (1.88 m), the shoal draft keel-equipped version of the boat has a draft of 5.9 ft (1.8 m), while the centerboard-equipped version has a draft of 6.75 ft (2.06 m) with the centerboard extended and 3.5 ft (1.1 m) with it retracted, allowing operation in shallow water.

The boat is fitted with a Japanese Yanmar diesel engine of 16 or 22 hp (12 or 16 kW) for docking and maneuvering. The fuel tank holds 17 U.S. gallons (64 L; 14 imp gal) and the fresh water tank has a capacity of 30 U.S. gallons (110 L; 25 imp gal).

The design has sleeping accommodation for six people, with a double "V"-berth in the bow cabin, a U-shaped settee and a straight settee in the main cabin and an aft cabin with a single berth on the starboard side. The galley is located on the port side at the companionway ladder. The galley is U-shaped and is equipped with a two-burner stove, an ice box and a double sink. A navigation station is opposite the galley, on the starboard side. The head is located just aft of the bow cabin on the port side and includes a shower. The main cabin headroom is 73 in (185 cm), while the bow cabin headroom is 67 in (170 cm).

For sailing downwind the design may be equipped with a symmetrical spinnaker of 969 sq ft (90.0 m^{2}).

The design has a hull speed of 6.87 kn (12.72 km/h).

== See also ==
- List of sailing boat types
