= Two Ton class =

Offshore sailing class

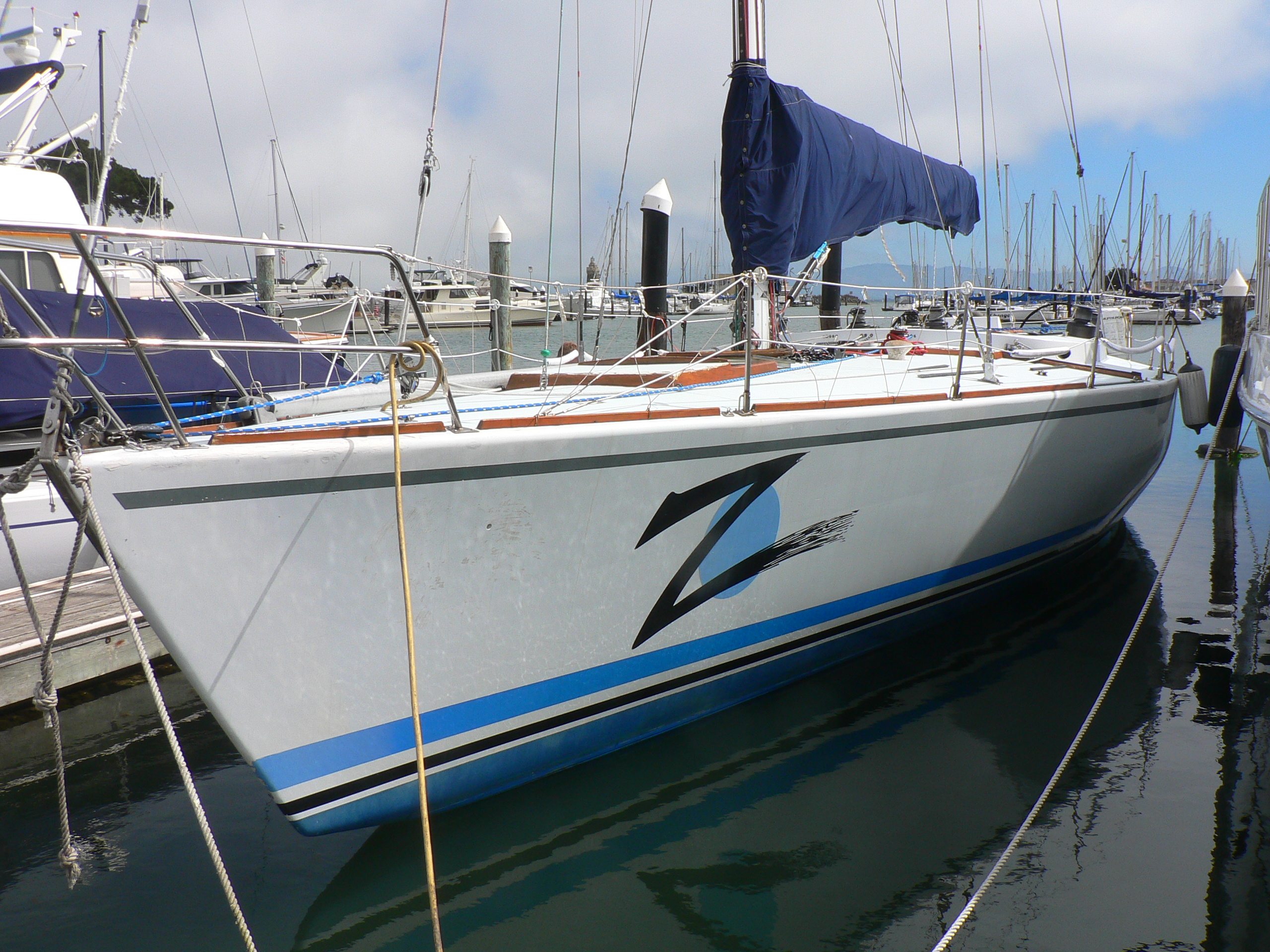

Two Ton class is an offshore sailing class of the International Offshore Rule. The Two Ton Cup is held by the Royal Ocean Racing Club as part of its Admiral's Cup.

== See also ==
- Mini Ton class
- Quarter Ton class
- Half Ton class
- Three-Quarter Ton class
- One Ton class
- Midget Ocean Racing Club
