= Seaway 25 =

Type of sailboat

The Seaway 25 was designed by Doug Peterson of USA fame for Tom Stevenson in 1978 after Tom won the World half Ton championship in one of Doug's designs. The yacht was designed to sail well on the short sharp chop of Port Phillip Bay Melbourne Australia. Intended to rate as a quarter ton Trailer yacht under IOR and Junior Offshore Group racing both for Harbour and Inshore Yacht racing.

== Specifications ==
LOA Length	25 ft 10 in (7.87 m)	
Length waterline	21 ft 2 in ( 6.45 m)	
Beam Width	8 ft 1.5 in ( 2.49 m)	
Draft Board down	5 ft 0 in ( 1.52 m)	
Draft Board up	1 ft 1 in (0.33 m)	
Displacement	2800 lb ( 1270 kg) light	
Ballast	1300 lb ( 590 kg)	
Tow Mass	2800 lb (1270 kg)+ trailer + gear	
Rigging	3/4 Fractional rig sloop	
Mast	30 ft 0 in (9.55 m) (Etchel)	single, backswept spreader
Sails	Main	135 ft² ( 13.8m²)
Sails	Jib < (100%)	108 ft² ( 10.9 m²)
Sails	#1 Genoa (150%)	162 ft² ( 16 m²)
Sails	#2 Genoa ( %)	ft² ( m²)
Sails	#3 Genoa (75%)	82 ft² (8.32 m²)
Spinnaker	345 ft² ( 35 m²)	

I = 25.5 ft (8.12 m)

J = 8.5 ft (2.7 m)

P = 27 ft (8.6 m)

E = 10 ft (3.18 m)

== Sailing details ==
Handicaps

- PHRF = ,
- Portsmouth = ,
- IRC = ,
- IOR = 18.0 ft, (Quarter ton),

Class based Handicaps,

- CBH (Aust.) = 0.725,
- Other = ,

Sailing Characteristics; A safely-balanced helm and boat in rough seas in light ghosting conditions. Stern is narrower and has up-to-standard windward performance, planing in moderate seas.
