= Sun Legende 41 =

Sailboat class

Development
- Designer: Doug Peterson
- Location: France
- Year: 1984
- No. built: 580
- Builder: Jeanneau
- Role: Cruiser-Racer
- Name: Sun Legende 41

Boat
- Displacement: 16,094 lb (7,300 kg)
- Draft: 6.42 ft (1.96 m)

Hull
- Type: monohull
- Construction: fiberglass
- LOA: 40.83 ft (12.44 m)
- LWL: 32.75 ft (9.98 m)
- Beam: 12.92 ft (3.94 m)
- Engine: inboard 44 to 55 hp (33 to 41 kW) diesel engine

Hull appendages
- Keel: fin keel
- Ballast: 6,834 lb (3,100 kg)
- Rudder: spade-type rudder

Rig
- Rig type: Bermuda rig
- I foretriangle height: 52.49 ft (16.00 m)
- J foretriangle base: 15.09 ft (4.60 m)
- P mainsail luff: 46.26 ft (14.10 m)
- E mainsail foot: 14.11 ft (4.30 m)

Sails
- Sailplan: masthead sloop
- Mainsail area: 360 sq ft (33 m^{2})
- Jib/genoa area: 210 sq ft (20 m^{2})
- Spinnaker area: 1,251 sq ft (116.2 m^{2})
- Other sails: genoa: 588 sq ft (54.6 m^{2}) solent: 379 sq ft (35.2 m^{2}) storm jib: 82 sq ft (7.6 m^{2})
- Upwind sail area: 948 sq ft (88.1 m^{2})
- Downwind sail area: 1,612 sq ft (149.8 m^{2})

The Sun Legende 41 is a French sailboat that was designed by American Doug Peterson as a cruiser-racer and first built in 1984. The design was based upon a prototype International Offshore Rule One Ton class racer, named Legende.

In 1990 the design was developed into the Sun Fast 41.

== Production ==
The design was built by Jeanneau in France in the United States, from 1984 to 1994, with 580 boats completed.

== Design ==
The Sun Legende 41 is a recreational keelboat, built predominantly of fiberglass, with wood trim. The hull is made from hand-laid polyester fiberglass, with an option of Kevlar reinforcement (Aramat K), while the deck is made of a fiberglass-balsa sandwich. It has a masthead sloop rig, with a keel-stepped mast, one set of unswept spreaders and aluminum spars. The hull has a raked stem, a reverse transom, an internally mounted spade-type rudder controlled by a wheel and a fixed fin keel, deep draft keel or stub keel and retractable centerboard.

The boat is fitted with an inboard 44 to 55 hp (33 to 41 kW) diesel engine for docking and maneuvering. The fuel tank holds 52.8 U.S. gallons (200 L; 44.0 imp gal) and the fresh water tank has a capacity of 92.5 U.S. gallons (350 L; 77.0 imp gal).

The design typically has sleeping accommodation for six people in three cabins, with a double "V"-berth in the bow cabin, two straight settees in the main cabin and two aft cabins with double berth. The galley is located on the port side at the companionway ladder. The galley is U-shaped and is equipped with a two-burner stove, an icebox and a double sink. A navigation station is opposite the galley, on the starboard side. The forward head is located just aft of the bow cabin on the port side, while there is also an aft head. Cabin maximum headroom is 79 in (201 cm). The "team" version has four cabins.

For sailing downwind the design may be equipped with a symmetrical spinnaker of 1,251 sq ft (116.2 m^{2}).

The design has a hull speed of 7.67 kn (14.20 km/h).

== Variants ==
Sun Legende 41 Fin Keel
This model displaces 16,094 lb (7,300 kg) and carries 6,878 lb (3,120 kg) of cast iron ballast. The boat has a draft of 6.42 ft (1.96 m) with the standard keel.
Sun Legende 41 Regatta
This racing-oriented model has a taller mast, a deeper keel and increased sail area. It displaces 16,094 lb (7,300 kg) and carries 6,878 lb (3,120 kg) of lead ballast. The boat has a draft of 6.92 ft (2.11 m) with the standard keel.
Sun Legende 41 Centerboard
This model displaces 16,226 lb (7,360 kg) and carries 6,878 lb (3,120 kg) of ballast, consisting of cast iron exterior ballast and a steel centerboard. The boat has a draft of 7.17 ft (2.19 m) with the centerboard down and 4.83 ft (1.47 m) with the centerboard retracted for operation in shallow water.

== Operational history ==
The boat was at one time supported by an active class club that organized racing events, the One Ton class.

== See also ==
- List of sailing boat types
