= Mystic Mini-Ton =

1977 American recreational keelboat

Development
- Designer: Bruce Kirby
- Location: United States
- Year: 1977
- No. built: 12
- Builder: Boat Company of Mystic
- Role: Racer
- Name: Mystic Mini-Ton

Boat
- Displacement: 1,850 lb (839 kg)
- Draft: 4.00 ft (1.22 m)

Hull
- Type: monohull
- Construction: fiberglass
- LOA: 21.50 ft (6.55 m)
- LWL: 17.50 ft (5.33 m)
- Beam: 8.50 ft (2.59 m)
- Engine: outboard motor

Hull appendages
- Keel: fin keel
- Ballast: 700 lb (318 kg)
- Rudder: internally-mounted spade-type rudder

Rig
- Rig type: Bermuda rig
- I foretriangle height: 22.10 ft (6.74 m)
- J foretriangle base: 7.40 ft (2.26 m)
- P mainsail luff: 25.50 ft (7.77 m)
- E mainsail foot: 10.30 ft (3.14 m)

Sails
- Sailplan: fractional rigged sloop
- Mainsail area: 131.30 sq ft (12.198 m^{2})
- Jib/genoa area: 81.77 sq ft (7.597 m^{2})
- Total sail area: 213.10 sq ft (19.798 m^{2})

Racing
- Class association: MORC
- PHRF: 219

The Mystic Mini-Tonis a fractional sloop rigged recreational keelboat designed as an International Offshore Rule Mini Ton class, Midget Ocean Racing Club, and club one design racer. First built in 1977 in Mystic, Connecticut, it is out of production, with 12 built.

The fiberglass hull has a reverse transom, and an internally mounted spade-type rudder controlled by a tiller. Its hull speed of 5.5 kn (10.2 km/h).

It has four berths and cabin headroom is 48 in (122 cm).
