= Handicap (sailing) =

Handicap forms for sailing vessels in sailing races have varied throughout history, and they also vary by country, and by sailing organisation. Sailing handicap standards exist internationally, nationally, and within individual sailing clubs.

Typically sailing vessel classes, including international classes, are defined by measurement rules, (Note: Measurement rules are different from the Sailing Rules which stipulate how races are run and the rights of yachts in different situations.) which categorise vessels accordingly into classes of vessels, and vessels compete within their class. Handicapping allows vessels to compete across classes, and also allows vessels and crews to compete based on performance and equipment on an equal basis, by adjusting the race outcome data, to declare a handicap (adjusted) winner as distinct from a line honours (first over the finish line) winner.

== History ==
During the early part of the 19th century interest in yacht racing had achieved sufficient momentum to need an agreed handicapping system to allow different types of yacht to race on an equitable basis. The method of measuring merchant sailing ships carried over into the world of yacht racing so that a yacht also now had a measured tonnage which allowed size comparisons and hence performance comparisons to be made between yachts on the basis that a properly designed big yacht will sail faster than a properly designed small yacht.

Each yacht fell within a Class based upon its measured tonnage. In the early 19th century four ranges of tonnage and hence four Classes were defined. Based on experience gained from the results of numerous races each Class was allocated a distance allowance that the Class had to give away to the next lower Class. This was equivalent to a Class 1 having to sail more distance than a Class 4 yacht during a race.

In 1834 handicapping by distance was changed to handicapping by time.

As yacht racing in particular became more and more popular designers started to look for and found loopholes in the measurement rules to enable a design to get a better rating. Whilst this encouraged designers it discouraged owners from participating in handicap racing because designs were being outdated almost before the yacht was launched.

In order to restore the equilibrium, work began on new formulas, which resulted, in the Thames Measurement which was the first formula defined for yachts.

The adoption of the British Thames Measurement by the Yacht Club de France in 1870 may mark the beginning of international rating rules. In 1893, the Germano-Scandinavian Union was formed and it developed its "Union Rule". Starting in 1902, under the leadership of the New York Yacht Club, U.S. yacht clubs agreed to a Universal Rule in 1905 which was based on a formula developed by Nathanael Herreshoff.

The Universal Rule determined a yacht's eligibility to race in the America's Cup from 1914 to 1937 and for this the J-class was chosen. Boats built according to the rule reached their peak in the large J-class yachts. This Rating Rule is intended to calculate a rating for yachts, which can then be used to calculate its Time Correction Factor (T.C.F.) in order to have disparate yachts racing against each other.

The International Offshore Rule (IOR) was a measurement rule for racing sailboats. The IOR evolved from the Cruising Club of America (CCA) rule for racer/cruisers and the Royal Ocean Racing Club (RORC) rule.

The IOR concentrated on hull shape with length, beam, freeboard and girth measurements, foretriangle, mast and boom measurements, and stability with an inclination test. Additionally, the IOR identified features which were dangerous, or it couldn't fairly rate, and penalized or prohibited them. The measurements and penalties were used to compute the handicap number, called an IOR rating, in feet. The higher the rating, the faster the boat was deemed to be able to sail.

The IOR was superseded by the International Measurement System (IMS), now updated as Offshore Racing Congress Rule (ORC) and International Rating Certificate (IRC). While some yachts race at club level under ORC or IRC in more or less their original form, others had major surgery to make them competitive within the new rules.

In the United States, the most common handicapping rule is the PHRF rule, developed and promoted by the United States Sailing Association. While most other rules do not take past performance into account, PHRF differentiates itself by allowing skippers to request handicap reductions after a series of poor racing results.

In Europe, the most common handicapping system used today is the IRC rule.

== International Rating Certificate ==
IRC is a system managed by the Royal Ocean Racing Club (RORC) in the United Kingdom through their dedicated Rating Office, and the Union Nationale pour la Course au Large (UNCL) in France.

== Offshore Racing Congress Rule ==
The ORC is a system managed by the Offshore Racing Congress.

== Performance Handicap Racing Fleet ==
Performance Handicap Racing Fleet (PHRF) is a handicapping system used for yacht racing in North America. It allows dissimilar classes of sailboats to be raced against each other. The aim is to cancel out the inherent advantages and disadvantages of each class of boats, so that results reflect crew skill rather than equipment superiority.

PHRF is used mainly for larger sailboats (i.e., 7 meters and above). For dinghy racing, the Portsmouth yardstick handicapping system is more likely to be used.

The handicap number assigned to a class of yachts is based on the yacht's speed relative to a theoretical yacht with a rating of 0. A yacht's handicap, or rating, is the number of seconds per mile traveled that the yacht in question should be behind the theoretical yacht. Most boats have a positive PHRF rating, but some very fast boats have a negative PHRF rating. If Boat A has a PHRF rating of 15 and Boat B has a rating of 30 and they compete on a 1-mile course, Boat A should finish approximately 15 seconds in front of Boat B. Results are adjusted for handicap by the race committee after all competitors have finished.

Each region has its own variation on PHRF rules and ratings, based on local conditions.

In some countries a Performance Handicap Racing Fleet (PHRF) may be used to rate trailer sailers, such as in NZ and in the USA and Canada.

== Yardstick ==
Rather than a vessel measurement rule, Yardstick as in Portsmouth Yardstick is used in the UK is a way of rating different classes of trailer yachts relative to each other. These are adjusted annually at a state or regional level. At a club level, starting from a CBH or Yardstick rating a Performance Based Handicap or PBH may be used, such as PBH. This attempts to measure the relative performance of a particular yacht and crew against other yachts and crews either of the same type of other type. Clubs will often run an event or season championship based only upon a CBH rating together with a handicap winner based upon a regularly adjusted PBH figure for each yacht and crew. In theory the PBH which is adjusted after each race gives each boat an equal chance of winning each race.

== International rule ==
The International rule, also known as the Metre rule, was created for the measuring and rating of yachts to allow different designs of yacht to race together under a handicap system. Prior to the ratification of the International rule in 1907, countries raced yachts under their own national rules and international competition was always subject to various forms of subjective handicapping.

== Class Based Handicap ==
Class Based Handicap (CBH) measurement system is used, for example, for trailer sailers, such as in Australia and also in New Zealand.

In Australia, the CBH system is a nationally governed handicap designed to assess the potential speed of the boat. It does not take into account the experience of the crew. Vessels are given a rating number based on a set of measurements. It represents a very well sailed boat kept in top racing condition, that is the boat at minimum weight, good sails, fair hull.

== Velocity prediction program ==
Velocity prediction program (VPP)s are used by a variety of sailing organizations to assess theoretical boat performance and then assign "handicaps" to allow boats of different styles and sizes to race against one another. The IOR and IMS handicapping rules were some of the earliest adopters of VPPs.
