= Legende 1 Ton =

Sailboat class

Development
- Designer: Doug Peterson
- Location: France
- Year: 1984
- Builder: Jeanneau
- Role: Racer
- Name: Legende 1 Ton

Boat
- Displacement: 13,500 lb (6,123 kg)
- Draft: 7.40 ft (2.26 m)

Hull
- Type: monohull
- Construction: fiberglass
- LOA: 40.19 ft (12.25 m)
- LWL: 32.19 ft (9.81 m)
- Beam: 12.86 ft (3.92 m)
- Engine: inboard motor

Hull appendages
- Keel: fin keel
- Ballast: 7,055 lb (3,200 kg)
- Rudder: spade-type rudder

Rig
- Rig type: Bermuda rig
- I foretriangle height: 47.40 ft (14.45 m)
- J foretriangle base: 14.00 ft (4.27 m)
- P mainsail luff: 50.70 ft (15.45 m)
- E mainsail foot: 17.80 ft (5.43 m)

Sails
- Sailplan: fractional rigged sloop
- Mainsail area: 451.23 sq ft (41.921 m^{2})
- Jib/genoa area: 331.80 sq ft (30.825 m^{2})
- Total sail area: 783.03 sq ft (72.746 m^{2})

The Legende 1 Ton is a French sailboat that was designed by Doug Peterson as an International Offshore Rule One Ton class racer and first built in 1984.

The design started with a class prototype, named Legende and was later developed into the Sun Legende 41 cruiser-racer.

== Production ==
The design was built by Jeanneau in France, starting in 1984, but it is now out of production.

== Design ==
The Legende 1 Ton is a racing keelboat, built predominantly of fiberglass. It has a fractional sloop rig and a fixed fin keel. It displaces 13,500 lb (6,123 kg) and carries 7,055 lb (3,200 kg) of lead ballast.

The boat has a draft of 7.40 ft (2.26 m) with the standard keel and a hull speed of 7.6 kn (14.1 km/h).

== Operational history ==
The boat was at one time supported by an active class club that organized racing events, the One Ton class.

== See also ==
- List of sailing boat types
