= Offshore Racing Congress Rule =

Concept in the field of sailing racing

The Offshore Racing Congress Rule is a system of handicapping sailboats for the purpose of racing. It is managed by the Offshore Racing Congress (ORC) and is usually referred to in the sailing community simply as "ORC". ORC is an enhanced version of the earlier IMS handicapping system that was used globally from the early 1990s to the early 2000s.

== Synopsis ==
The ORC rule uses essentially the same concepts as the earlier IMS system but with a much more sophisticated velocity prediction program performing the handicapping calculations than was available in the IMS era. This improved program is designed to eliminate the problems that led to IMS falling out of favour with yacht clubs in the early 2000s.

IMS is (as of 2008) gaining support among the premium ocean racing clubs around the world as it is an open system, where all the details of the handicapping formula are available to designers and boat owners. This allows a greater degree of certainty when designing boats than closed, secret formulas such as IRC allow for. However, the 'secret' nature of the IRC rule has also been praised, as encouraging designers to simply design the 'best boat', and not produce the extreme and often unsafe designs which became the hallmark of the IOR rule.

To encourage the growth of the rule, two versions have been developed. The ORC-International rule (ORCi) is the full complexity, highly developed version for top level championship racing. An ORC-Club rule has also been developed, which is a simplified version more easily used by smaller clubs who have less resources.
