= Ballad 30 =

Sailboat class

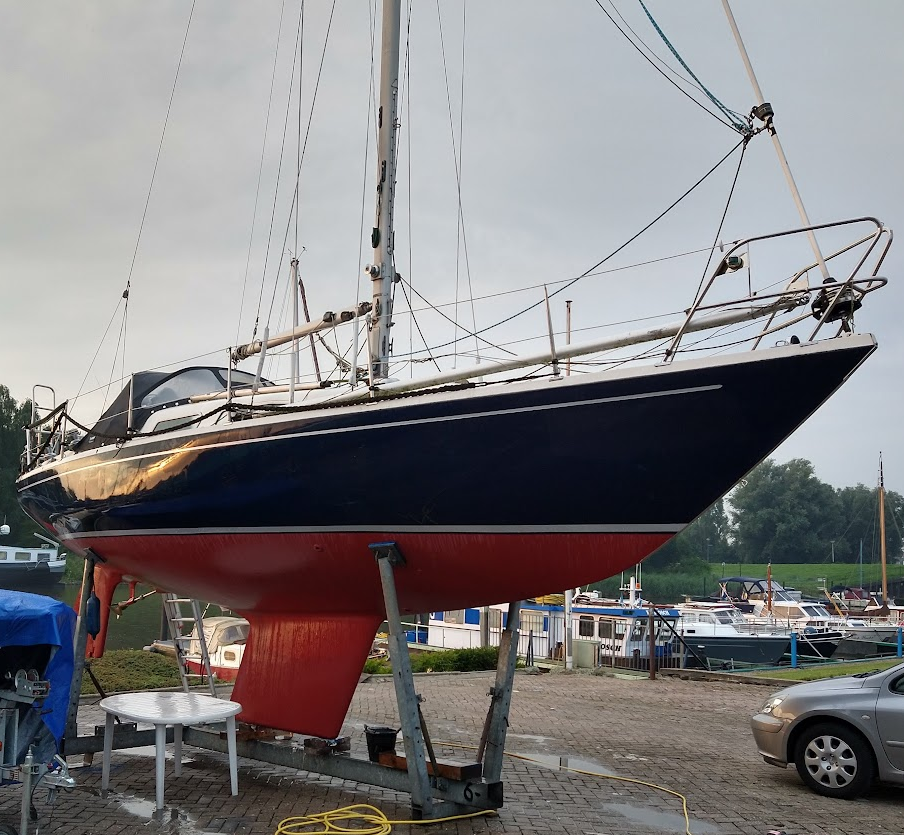

Development
- Designer: Rolf Magnusson
- Location: Sweden
- Year: 1971
- No. built: about 2000
- Builders: Albin Marine; Shipman Sweden AB
- Role: Cruiser-Racer
- Name: Ballad 30

Boat
- Displacement: 7,276 lb (3,300 kg)
- Draft: 5.10 ft (1.55 m)

Hull
- Type: monohull
- Construction: fibreglass
- LOA: 29.92 ft (9.12 m)
- LWL: 22.58 ft (6.88 m)
- Beam: 9.67 ft (2.95 m)
- Engine: Volvo Penta MD6A 10 hp (7 kW) diesel engine

Hull appendages
- Keel: fin keel
- Ballast: 3,417 lb (1,550 kg)
- Rudder: skeg-mounted rudder

Rig
- Rig type: Bermuda rig
- I foretriangle height: 37.08 ft (11.30 m)
- J foretriangle base: 12.25 ft (3.73 m)
- P mainsail luff: 32.00 ft (9.75 m)
- E mainsail foot: 9.33 ft (2.84 m)

Sails
- Sailplan: masthead sloop
- Mainsail area: 171 sq ft (15.9 m^{2})
- Jib/genoa area: 199 sq ft (18.5 m^{2})
- Spinnaker area: 753 sq ft (70.0 m^{2})
- Gennaker area: 347 sq ft (32.2 m^{2})
- Other sails: Solent: 271 sq ft (25.2 m^{2})
- Upwind sail area: 518 sq ft (48.1 m^{2})
- Downwind sail area: 925 sq ft (85.9 m^{2})

The Ballad 30, also called the Albin Ballad, is a Swedish sailboat that was designed by Rolf Magnusson as an International Offshore Rule (IOR) Half Ton class cruiser-racer and first built in 1971.

The design is a development of the Joker S30 IOR racer.

The Ballad 30 was replaced in the company's product line in 1983 by the Delta 31.

== Production ==
The design was initially built by Albin Marine in Sweden from 1971 to 1982, with about 1,500 boats completed. After that company went out of business in 1982, the Ballard One-Design Association acquired the moulds and leased them to a number of companies, including Shipman Sweden AB and a few more boats were completed until 1998, but it is now out of production.

== Design ==
The Ballad 30 is a recreational keelboat, built predominantly of fibreglass, with wood trim. The hull is made from single skin polyester fibreglass, while the deck is a fibreglass-Divinicell sandwich. It has a masthead sloop rig with aluminum spars, a keel-stepped mast, wire standing rigging and a single set of unswept spreaders. The hull has a raked stem; a raised counter, reverse transom; a skeg-mounted rudder controlled by a tiller with an extension and a fixed fin keel. It displaces 7,276 lb (3,300 kg) and carries 3,417 lb (1,550 kg) of lead ballast.

The boat has a draft of 5.10 ft (1.55 m) with the standard keel.

The boat was factory-fitted with a series of Swedish Volvo Penta diesel engines, located under the companionway steps, for docking and manoeuvring. From 1971 to 1975 it came with a 10 hp (7 kW) MD6A, between 1976 and 1977 it was equipped with a 10 hp (7 kW) MD6B, from 1977 to 1978 a 13 hp (10 kW) MD7A, from 1978 to 1984 a 17 hp (13 kW) MD7B and from 1984 and later an 18 hp (13 kW) VP 2002 engine. The fuel tank holds 8.7 U.S. gallons (33 L; 7.2 imp gal) and the fresh water tank has a capacity of 17.2 U.S. gallons (65 L; 14.3 imp gal).

The design has sleeping accommodation for six people, with a double "V"-berth in the bow cabin, two straight settees in the main cabin, with two pipe berths above them. The main cabin also has a drop-leaf table. The galley is located on the starboard side just forward of the companionway ladder. The galley is L-shaped and is equipped with a two-burner stove and a double sink. A navigation station is opposite the galley, on the port side. The enclosed head is located just aft of the bow cabin on the starboard side.

For sailing the design may be equipped with a symmetrical spinnaker of 753 sq ft (70.0 m^{2}). It has a hull speed of 6.38 kn (11.82 km/h).

== Operational history ==
A 2009 Yachting Monthly review notes that the Ballad 30 is one of the most successful cruiser-racers designed. The review describes the design, "her fin keel and semi-elliptical rudder were advanced for the times, as was her masthead rig with its tiny mainsail and huge, overlapping genoa which needs powerful winches or strapping crew to manage. Roller-reefing is essential. The hull is slim, well balanced and easily driven and she has a surprisingly easy motion in a seaway. On the other hand, she can be wet upwind in a chop and a bit of a handful downwind if overcanvassed. She has a long, comfortable and well-protected cockpit and tiller steering. She has six berths in two cabins, including two rather awkward pilot berths. By modern standards the galley is small but adequate, as is the heads."

== See also ==
- List of sailing boat types
