= Yamaha 26 =

Sailboat class

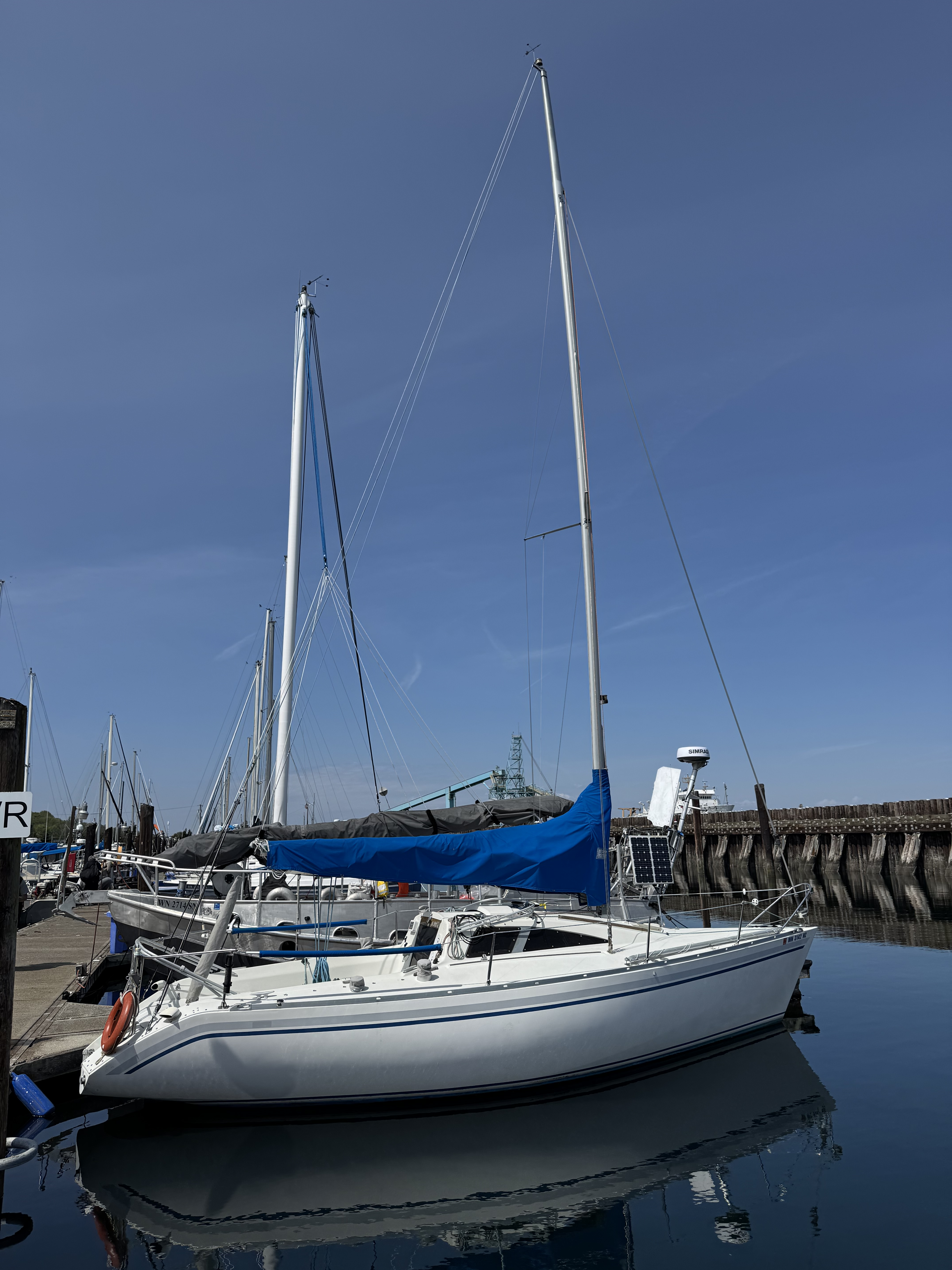
- 1983 Yamaha 26 Tall Rig

Development
- Designer: Yamaha Design Team
- Location: Japan
- Year: 1979
- Builder: Yamaha Motor Company
- Name: Yamaha 26

Boat
- Displacement: 4,343 lb (1,970 kg)
- Draft: 5.09 ft (1.55 m)

Hull
- Type: Monohull
- Construction: Fiberglass
- LOA: 26.19 ft (7.98 m)
- LWL: 21.00 ft (6.40 m)
- Beam: 9.19 ft (2.80 m)
- Engine: Yanmar 1GM 7.5 hp (6 kW) diesel engine

Hull appendages
- Keel: fin keel
- Ballast: 1,433 lb (650 kg)
- Rudder: internally-mounted spade-type rudder

Rig
- Rig type: Bermuda rig
- I foretriangle height: 28.54 ft (8.70 m)
- J foretriangle base: 8.69 ft (2.65 m)
- P mainsail luff: 29.86 ft (9.10 m)
- E mainsail foot: 11.15 ft (3.40 m)

Sails
- Sailplan: Fractional rigged sloop
- Mainsail area: 166.47 sq ft (15.466 m^{2})
- Jib/genoa area: 124.01 sq ft (11.521 m^{2})
- Total sail area: 290.48 sq ft (26.986 m^{2})

Racing
- PHRF: 201 (average)

The Yamaha 26 is a Japanese sailboat that was designed by the Yamaha Design Team as a cruiser-racer and first built in 1979.

== Production ==
The design was built by the Yamaha Motor Company in Japan starting in 1979, but it is now out of production.

== Design ==
The Yamaha 26 design was based upon Magician V, a prototype boat that won the 1978 Quarter Ton class.

It is a recreational keelboat, built predominantly of fiberglass, with aluminum spars. It has a fractional sloop rig, a raked stem, a raised and squared-off reverse transom with an integral swimming ladder, an internally mounted spade-type rudder controlled by a tiller and a fixed fin keel. It displaces 4,343 lb (1,970 kg) and carries 1,433 lb (650 kg) of ballast.

The boat has a draft of 5.09 ft (1.55 m) with the standard keel fitted.

The boat is fitted with a Japanese Yanmar 1GM diesel engine of 7.5 hp (6 kW). The fuel tank holds 7 U.S. gallons (26 L; 5.8 imp gal) and the fresh water tank has a capacity of 18 U.S. gallons (68 L; 15 imp gal).

The boat's galley is located on the port side of the cabin and includes a single-burner stove that slides under the port quarter berth. The head has a privacy door and is located forward, just aft of the bow "V"-berth. Additional sleeping space is provided by two quarter berths, although the entire cabin can be used for sleeping space, using the seat-back cushions. A small table can be fitted on the starboard side and can be stowed when not in use.

The cockpit has two genoa winches, two spinnaker winches (optional) and a two more halyard winches (optional for spinnaker halyard) on the cabin top. The mainsheet traveler is in the centre of the large cockpit. There are recessed genoa tracks inboard. A spinnaker was provided as factory standard equipment.

The design has a PHRF racing average handicap of 201 with a high of 192 and low of 215. It has a hull speed of 6.14 kn (11.37 km/h).

The boat was subject to a major design update, during production in 1982.

== Operational history ==
In a review Richard Sherwood wrote, "Many aspects of the Yamaha 26 are unusual, and it almost appears that the designers decided to throw out all traditional ideas and design for function only."

== See also ==
- List of sailing boat types
