= C&C 29-2 =

1980s Canadian recreational keelboat

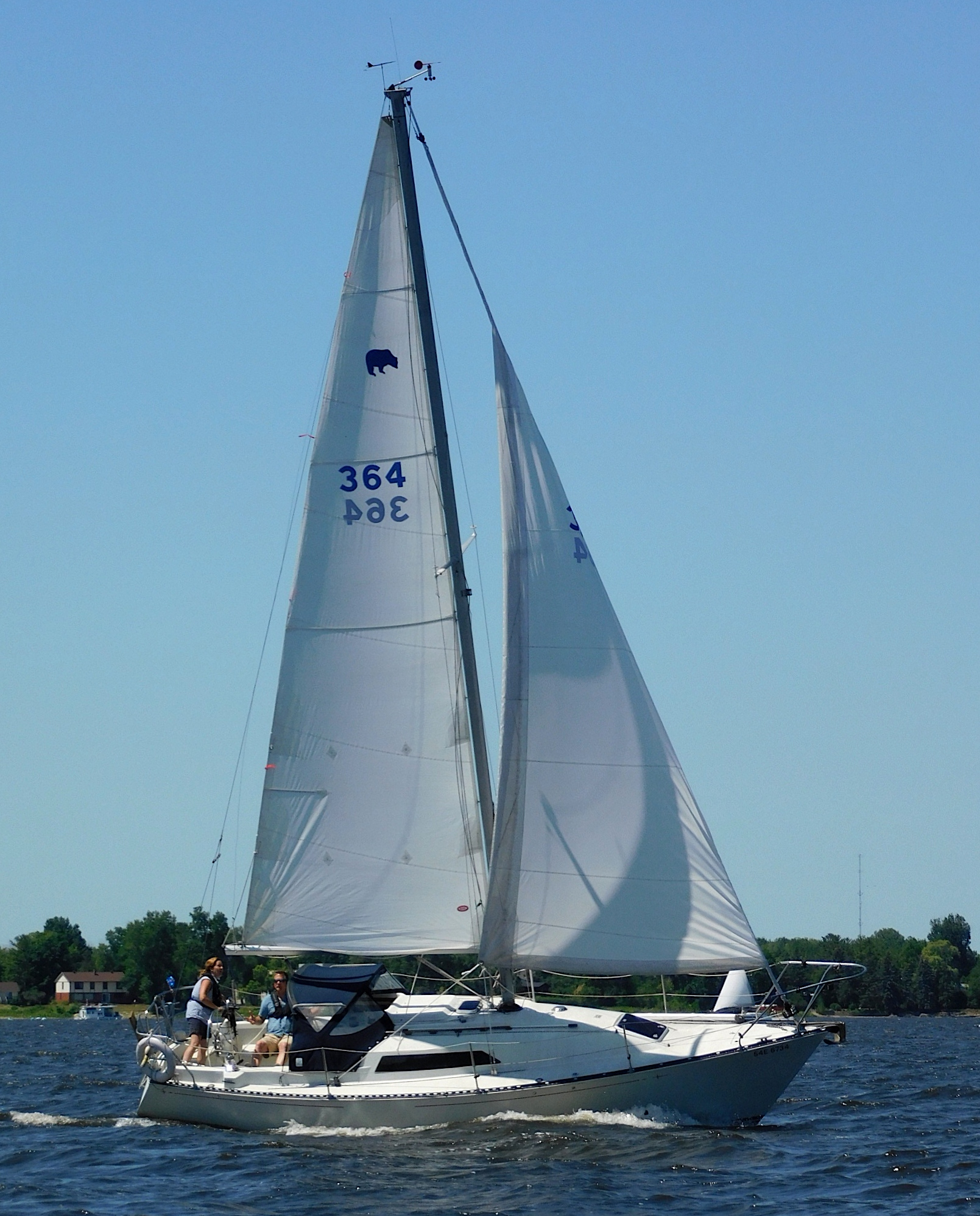

Development
- Designer: Cuthbertson & Cassian
- Location: Canada
- Year: 1983
- No. built: about 400
- Builder: C&C Yachts
- Role: Racer-Cruiser
- Name: C&C 29-2

Boat
- Displacement: 6,700 lb (3,039 kg)
- Draft: 5.30 ft (1.62 m)

Hull
- Type: monohull
- Construction: fibreglass
- LOA: 28.50 ft (8.69 m)
- LWL: 22.33 ft (6.81 m)
- Beam: 9.42 ft (2.87 m)
- Engine: Yanmar 2GMF diesel engine

Hull appendages
- Keel: fin keel
- Ballast: 2,700 lb (1,225 kg)
- Rudder: internally-mounted spade-type rudder

Rig
- Rig type: Bermuda rig
- I foretriangle height: 38.50 ft (11.73 m)
- J foretriangle base: 11.33 ft (3.45 m)
- P mainsail luff: 33.25 ft (10.13 m)
- E mainsail foot: 10.62 ft (3.24 m)

Sails
- Sailplan: masthead sloop
- Mainsail area: 176.56 sq ft (16.403 m^{2})
- Jib/genoa area: 218.10 sq ft (20.262 m^{2})
- Total sail area: 394.66 sq ft (36.665 m^{2})

Racing
- PHRF: 174 (average)

The C&C 29-2 is a Midget Ocean Racing Club racer cruiser. It is unrelated to the 1977 C&C 29 design and is usually referred to as the 29-2. About 400 were built by C&C Yachts in Canada and the United States, from 1983 until 1986.

It is a tall double-spreader masthead sloop with a split backstay.

The fibreglass hull has a raked stem, a reverse transom, an internally mounted high aspect spade-type rudder controlled by a wheel. Draft is 5.30 ft (1.62 m) with the standard keel and 4.0 ft (1.2 m) with the shoal keel.

It has five to six berths and a cabin height of 6 ft. It has a T-shaped cockpit.

The fin keel version has a PHRF racing average handicap of 174 with a high of 188 and low of 171, while the shoal draft version has a PHRF racing average handicap of 177 with a high of 186 and low of 171. Both have hull speeds of 6.33 kn (11.72 km/h).
