= Doug Peterson (yacht designer) =

American yacht designer (1945–2017)

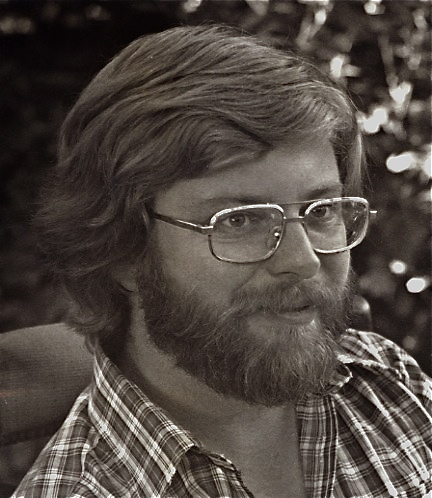
- Doug Peterson in 1973
- Born: July 25, 1945; Los Angeles
- Died: June 26, 2017 (aged 71); San Diego
- Awards: America's Cup Hall of Fame (2017)

Douglas Blair Peterson (July 25, 1945 – June 26, 2017) was an American yacht designer. Beginning with the One Tonner Ganbare in 1973, Peterson's designs have pioneered many innovations in racing and cruising yachts.

In the mid-1970s, Peterson's designs dominated offshore racing events, with a string of winning high-profile IOR boats. Designed for Jack Kelly Yachts, the Peterson 44 debuted in 1976. This boat was a pioneer in performance cruising yacht design and one can still see many of the over 200 built in ports around the world. The design was followed by the Kelly Peterson 46 of which 30 were built. Hull number 30, the last one built, completed a circumnavigation of the globe in 2017. Also the Liberty 458 and the Delta 46 were based on this design. In the same period, he designed five sailboats, for the English yard Jeremy Rogers, the Contessa 28, 35, 39 and 43 as well as the OOD34.

Designed 'Deception' One Tonner launched in 1978 with Fractional rig and fixed keel, won her division in the 1978 Sydney to Hobart yacht race and placed eighth overall. Also designed ‘Streaker’ one tonner launched several years earlier, which also won her division and placed fourth overall in the same 1978 race.

The Peterson 33 was one of the few cruising yachts designed by Peterson. The design was meant for amateur boat builders and was first advertised in the July 1976 edition of the Wooden Boat Magazine. The first completed boat proved "quite fast and lively and is relatively dry in a chop". The design prioritized straightforward construction methods accessible to amateur builders while delivering sailing performance competitive with boats of similar size.

In the early 1980s Hans Christian Yachts commissioned him to design their 48 and 52 Christina models. "I have designed the Christina 52 to have great speed with a very comfortable motion and it is designed as a pure cruising boat."

Peterson later entered the America's Cup circle as a key design member of the winning 1992 America^{3} and 1995 NZL 32 Black Magic Team New Zealand design teams. In 2000, Peterson designed the winning Louis Vuitton Cup boat for Prada Challenge.

Peterson died on June 26, 2017, in San Diego, California after a long battle with cancer, aged 71, shortly after the Kelly Peterson 46 Esprit finished her fourteen-year circumnavigation.

== Designs ==
- Chaser 29
- Islander 40
- Ganbare 35
- Legende 1 Ton
- Seaway 25
- Sun Fast 41
- Sun Legende 41
- Triton 27
- Triton 30
- Peterson 33
- Kelly Peterson 46
- US Yachts US 27
- US Yachts US 29
- US Yachts US 30
- US Yachts US 33
- Bavaria 35 Match
- Bavaria 38 Match
- Bavaria 42 Match
