= Dione 98 =

Sailboat class

Development
- Designer: Gary Mull
- Location: Spain
- Year: 1970
- Builder: Nautiber SA
- Name: Dione 98

Boat
- Crew: two
- Displacement: 6,834 lb (3,100 kg)
- Draft: 5.58 ft (1.70 m)

Hull
- Construction: Fiberglass
- LOA: 31.99 ft (9.75 m)
- LWL: 23.82 ft (7.26 m)
- Beam: 10.27 ft (3.13 m)

Hull appendages
- Keel: fixed keel
- Rudder: spade

Rig
- General: Masthead sloop
- I foretriangle height: 38.06 ft (11.60 m)
- J foretriangle base: 12.17 ft (3.71 m)
- P mainsail luff: 31.50 ft (9.60 m)
- E mainsail foot: 10.33 ft (3.15 m)

Sails
- Mainsail area: 162.70 sq ft (15.115 m^{2})
- Jib/genoa area: 231.60 sq ft (21.516 m^{2})
- Total sail area: 394.29 sq ft (36.631 m^{2})

The Dione 98 is a sailboat, that was designed by Gary Mull as an International Offshore Rule Half Ton class racer and first built in 1970.

The boat's designation indicates its approximate length overall in decimetres.

== Production ==
The boat was built by Nautiber SA in Spain, starting in 1970, but is now out of production.

== Design ==
The Dione 98 is a small recreational keelboat, built predominantly of fiberglass. It has a masthead sloop rig, an internally-mounted, spade-type rudder and a fixed fin keel. It displaces 6,834 lb (3,100 kg) and carries 3,329 lb (1,510 kg) of ballast. It has a 32 U.S. gallons (120 L; 27 imp gal) water tank and a 12 U.S. gallons (45 L; 10.0 imp gal) fuel tank.

The boat has a hull speed of 6.54 kn (12.11 km/h).

== See also ==
- List of sailing boat types
