= Triton 30 =

Sailboat class

Development
- Designer: Doug Peterson
- Location: United States
- Year: 1985
- Builder: Pearson Yachts
- Role: Racer-Cruiser
- Name: Triton 30

Boat
- Displacement: 6,800 lb (3,084 kg)
- Draft: 5.58 ft (1.70 m)

Hull
- Type: monohull
- Construction: fiberglass
- LOA: 29.25 ft (8.92 m)
- LWL: 24.50 ft (7.47 m)
- Beam: 12.25 ft (3.73 m)

Hull appendages
- Keel: fin keel
- Ballast: 2,850 lb (1,293 kg)
- Rudder: internally-mounted spade-type rudder

Rig
- Rig type: Bermuda rig
- I foretriangle height: 38.00 ft (11.58 m)
- J foretriangle base: 12.00 ft (3.66 m)
- P mainsail luff: 34.00 ft (10.36 m)
- E mainsail foot: 9.00 ft (2.74 m)

Sails
- Sailplan: masthead sloop
- Mainsail area: 153.00 sq ft (14.214 m^{2})
- Jib/genoa area: 228.00 sq ft (21.182 m^{2})
- Total sail area: 381.00 sq ft (35.396 m^{2})

The Triton 30 is a Canadian an American trailerable sailboat that was designed by Doug Peterson as a racer-cruiser and first built in 1985.

The design is an unauthorized development of Peterson's International Offshore Rule Half Ton class Chaser 29 racer, using the same hull design. The molds had been owned by US Yachts, a division of Bayliner to make the US Yachts US 29 and were sold to Pearson Yachts.

== Production ==
The design was built by Pearson Yachts in the United States, starting in 1985, but it is now out of production.

== Design ==
The Triton 30 is a recreational keelboat, built predominantly of fiberglass, with wood trim. It has a masthead sloop rig, a raked stem, a reverse transom, an internally mounted spade-type rudder controlled by a wheel and a fixed fin keel. It displaces 6,800 lb (3,084 kg) and carries 2,850 lb (1,293 kg) of ballast.

The boat has a draft of 5.58 ft (1.70 m) with the standard keel.

The design has a hull speed of 6.63 kn (12.28 km/h).

== See also ==
- List of sailing boat types
