= Hans Christian Yachts =

Brand of cruising sailboats

Hans Christian is a brand of heavilybuilt cruising sailboats.

== History ==
Most designs are credited to Robert H. Perry, Harwood Ives, Scott Sprague and Tommy Chen. Boat production began in the early 1970s.

In the mid 1980s Hans Christian Yachts commissioned the designing of a new series of boats based on a more modern hull design with the goal of the "ultimate cruising sailboat." The end result was the Christina series with the 52 model designed by Doug Peterson and Scott Sprague designing the 40, 43 and 48 versions. Construction was done in Taiwan at Horng Bin Marine Yacht boat yard and in the early 1990s the molds and construction were moved to Thailand.

== Hans Christian today ==
In November 2004 production of the traditional range of Hans Christian Yachts was transferred from Andersen Yachts Ltd to Pantawee Marine Co., Ltd.

In February 2017 Pantawee Marine Co., Ltd officially discontinued building the traditional range of Hans Christian sailing yachts including the 33T, 38MkII, 41T, 48T and Christina 43' to make way for production of other types of craft including catamarans under new management.

== Models ==
- Hans Christian 33 Traditional
- Hans Christian 34 C
- Hans Christian 38
- Hans Christian 38.5
- Hans Christian 41 Traditional
- Hans Christian 43 Center Cockpit
- Hans Christian 43 Ketch
- Hans Christian 43 Sloop
- Hans Christian 43 Traditional Keel
- Hans Christian 44
- Hans Christian Christina 40
- Hans Christian Christina 43
- Hans Christian Christina 48
- Hans Christian Christina 52

== See also ==
- List of sailboat designers and manufacturers
