= Delta 31 =

Sailboat class

Development
- Designer: Peter Norlin
- Location: Sweden
- Year: 1983
- No. built: 300
- Builder: Albin Marine

Boat
- Displacement: 8,598 lb (3,900 kg)
- Draft: 5.90 ft (1.80 m)

Hull
- Type: monohull
- Construction: fibreglass
- LOA: 30.68 ft (9.35 m)
- LWL: 24.93 ft (7.60 m)
- Beam: 9.97 ft (3.04 m)
- Engine: Yanmar 1GM 8 hp (6 kW) diesel engine

Hull appendages
- Keel: fin keel
- Ballast: 3,505 lb (1,590 kg)
- Rudder: internally-mounted spade-type rudder

Rig
- Rig type: Bermuda rig
- I foretriangle height: 36.09 ft (11.00 m)
- J foretriangle base: 11.15 ft (3.40 m)
- P mainsail luff: 37.73 ft (11.50 m)
- E mainsail foot: 12.47 ft (3.80 m)

Sails
- Sailplan: fractional rigged sloop
- Mainsail area: 235.25 sq ft (21.855 m^{2})
- Jib/genoa area: 201.20 sq ft (18.692 m^{2})
- Total sail area: 436.45 sq ft (40.548 m^{2})

The Delta 31, also called the Albin Delta, is a Swedish sailboat that was designed by Peter Norlin as a cruiser-racer and first built in 1983.

The Delta 31 was designed as a replacement for the Ballad 30 in the company's product line.

== Production ==
The design was built by Albin Marine in Sweden from 1983 to 1986, with 300 boats completed, but it is now out of production.

== Design ==
The Delta 31 is a recreational keelboat, built predominantly of fibreglass, with wood trim. It has a fractional sloop rig, a raked stem, a reverse transom, an internally mounted spade-type rudder controlled by a tiller and a fixed fin keel. It displaces 8,598 lb (3,900 kg) and carries 3,505 lb (1,590 kg) of ballast.

The boat has a draft of 5.90 ft (1.80 m) with the standard keel and is fitted with a Japanese Yanmar 1GM diesel engine of 8 hp (6 kW) for docking and manoeuvring.

The design has sleeping accommodation for six people, with a double "V"-berth in the bow cabin, an U-shaped settee and a quarter berth in the main cabin and an aft cabin with a double berth on the starboard side. The galley is located on the port side just forward of the companionway ladder. The galley is equipped with a two-burner stove and a round sink. A navigation station is aft of the galley, on the port side. The head is located just aft of the bow cabin on the starboard side.

== Operational history ==
In a 2009 review Yachting Monthly described the design as, "a sleek, powerful, fractionally rigged cruiser-racer".

== See also ==
- List of sailing boat types
