= C&C 29 =

1977 Canadian recreational keelboat

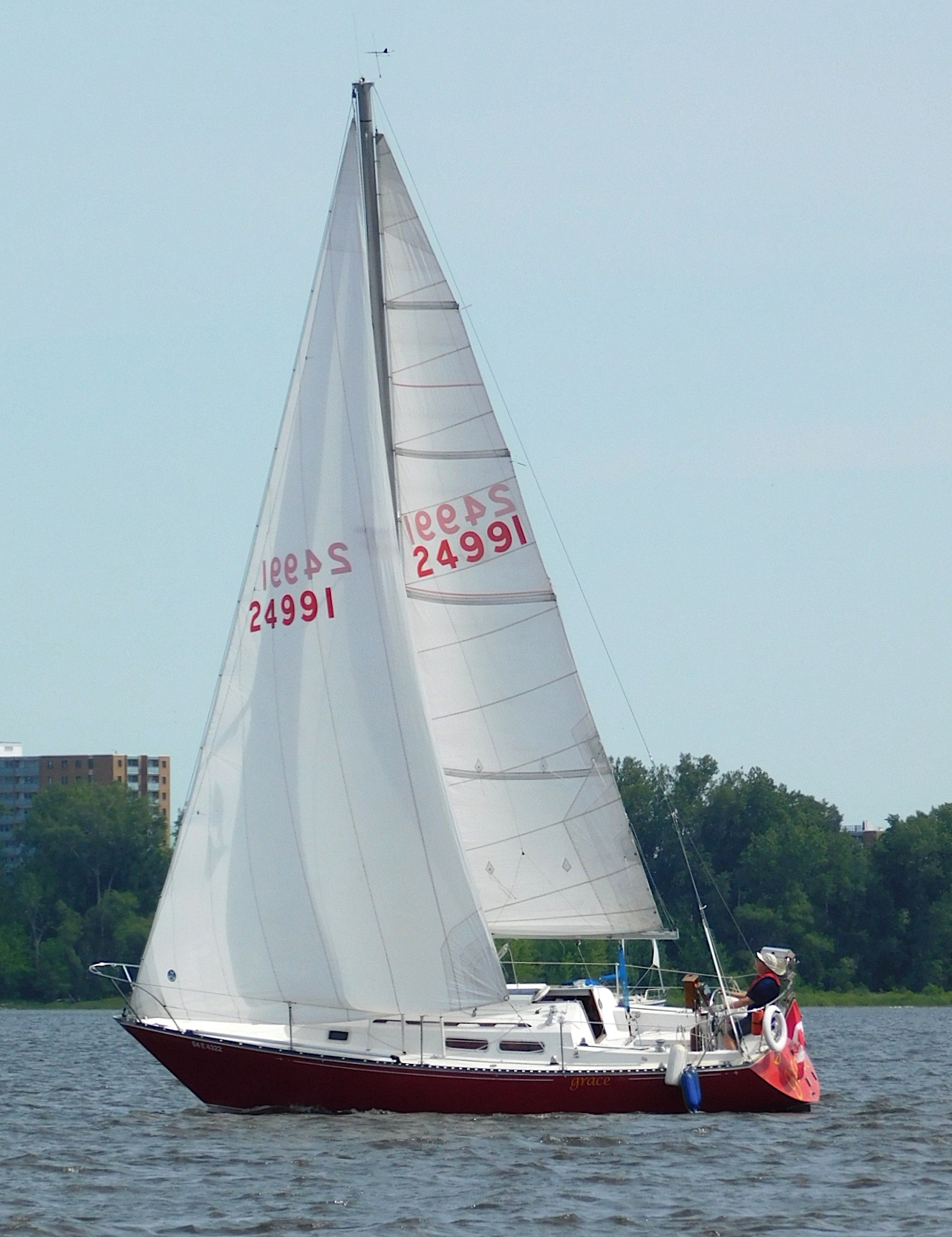
- C&C 29 Mark I

Development
- Designer: Cuthbertson & Cassian
- Location: Canada
- Year: 1977
- No. built: over 600
- Builder: C&C Yachts
- Role: Racer-Cruiser

Boat
- Displacement: 7,500 lb (3,402 kg)
- Draft: 5.25 ft (1.60 m)

Hull
- Type: Monohull
- Construction: Fibreglass
- LOA: 29.58 ft (9.02 m)
- LWL: 23.58 ft (7.19 m)
- Beam: 10.33 ft (3.15 m)
- Engine: Universal Atomic 4 30 hp (22 kW)

Hull appendages
- Keel: fin keel
- Ballast: 2,700 lb (1,225 kg)
- Rudder: internally-mounted spade-type rudder

Rig
- General: Masthead sloop
- I foretriangle height: 39.50 ft (12.04 m)
- J foretriangle base: 12.80 ft (3.90 m)
- P mainsail luff: 33.50 ft (10.21 m)
- E mainsail foot: 10.10 ft (3.08 m)

Sails
- Mainsail area: 169.18 sq ft (15.717 m^{2})
- Jib/genoa area: 252.80 sq ft (23.486 m^{2})
- Total sail area: 421.98 sq ft (39.203 m^{2})

Racing
- Class association: Half Ton class

Rating
- PHRF: 177 (average)

The C&C 29 is a recreational keelboat built by C&C Yachts in Canada, between 1977 and 1981, with some built in the US as well at their Rhode Island plant. Over 600 were built.

C&C also produced an unrelated C&C 29-2, also sold under the name C&C 29.

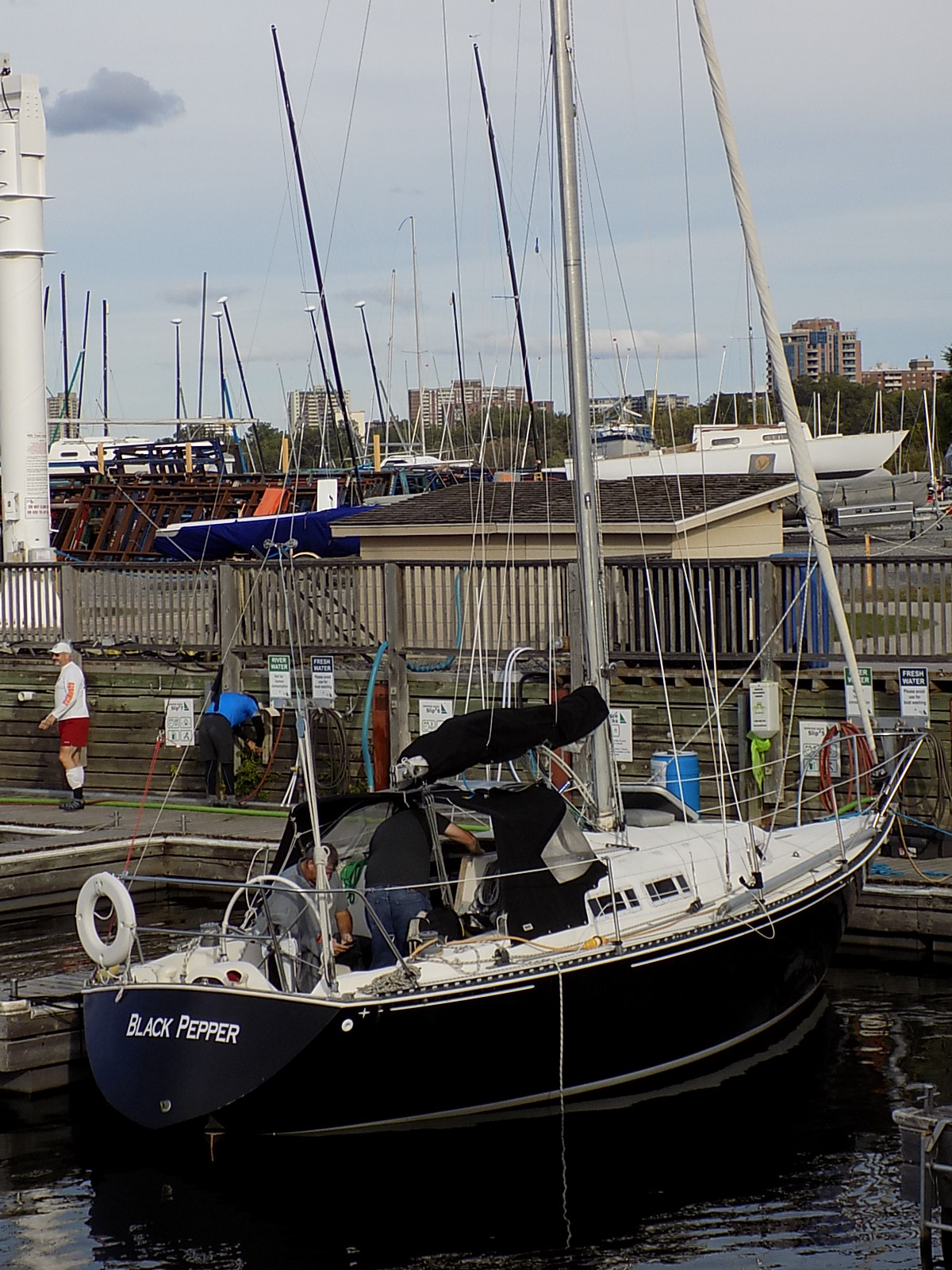
C&C 29 Mark I

The fibreglass hull has an internally-mounted spade-type rudder, and a draft of 5.25 ft (1.60 m) with the standard keel and 4.0 ft (1.2 m) with the shoal draft keel. Compared to previous designs, hull volume was moved from below the water line to the topside, creating “rather extreme” topside flare according to former C&C sales manager Hank Evans. The resulting hull form is tender and prone to weather helm.

It has a masthead sloop rig.

It has six berths. The galley is on the starboard side just forward of the companionway ladder. The galley is L-shaped and is equipped with a stove, ice box and a sink. A navigation station is opposite the galley, on the port side. The head is just aft of the bow cabin.

The boat has a PHRF racing average handicap of 177 with a high of 191 and low of 172. It has a hull speed of 6.51 kn (12.06 km/h).
