= Chaser 29 =

Sailboat class

Development
- Designer: Doug Peterson
- Location: United States
- Year: 1975
- Builder: Chaser Yachts
- Role: Racer
- Name: Chaser 29

Boat
- Displacement: 6,600 lb (2,994 kg)
- Draft: 5.58 ft (1.70 m)

Hull
- Type: monohull
- Construction: fibreglass
- LOA: 29.25 ft (8.92 m)
- LWL: 26.00 ft (7.92 m)
- Beam: 10.17 ft (3.10 m)
- Engine: Universal Atomic 4 30 hp (22 kW) gasoline engine

Hull appendages
- Keel: fin keel
- Rudder: internally-mounted spade-type rudder

Rig
- Rig type: Bermuda rig
- I foretriangle height: 38.00 ft (11.58 m)
- J foretriangle base: 12.25 ft (3.73 m)
- P mainsail luff: 34.00 ft (10.36 m)
- E mainsail foot: 9.00 ft (2.74 m)

Sails
- Sailplan: masthead sloop
- Mainsail area: 153.00 sq ft (14.214 m^{2})
- Jib/genoa area: 232.75 sq ft (21.623 m^{2})
- Total sail area: 385.75 sq ft (35.837 m^{2})

The Chaser 29 is a Canadian sailboat that was designed by American Doug Peterson as an International Offshore Rule Half Ton class racer and first built in 1975.

The design was developed into the Buccaneer 295, US Yachts US 27, US Yachts US 29, Triton 27 and Triton 30, all unauthorized copies.

== Production ==
The design was built by Chaser Yachts in Erin, Ontario, Canada, starting in 1975, but it is now out of production.

== Design ==
The Chaser 29 is a racing keelboat, built predominantly of fibreglass, with wood trim. It has a masthead sloop rig, a raked stem, a reverse transom, an internally mounted spade-type rudder controlled by a tiller and a fixed fin keel. It displaces 6,600 lb (2,994 kg).

The boat has a draft of 5.58 ft (1.70 m) with the standard keel.

The boat is fitted with a Universal Atomic 4 30 hp (22 kW) gasoline engine for docking and manoeuvring. The fuel tank holds 20 U.S. gallons (76 L; 17 imp gal) and the fresh water tank has a capacity of 10 U.S. gallons (38 L; 8.3 imp gal).

The design has sleeping accommodation for four people, with a double "V"-berth in the bow cabin and two straight settee berths in the main cabin. The galley is located on the starboard side amidships. The galley is equipped with a two-burner stove. The head is located just aft of the bow cabin on the port side.

The design has a hull speed of 6.83 kn (12.65 km/h).

== Operational history ==
The boat is supported by an active class club that organizes racing events, the Half Ton Class.

The prototype was named North Star and won the 1974 Half Ton World Championships, which were held in La Rochelle, France. One of the production boats, named Foxy Lady won the 1975 Half Ton World Championships, held in Chicago.

== See also ==
- List of sailing boat types
