= Sun Fast 41 =

Sailboat class

Development
- Designer: Doug Peterson
- Location: France
- Year: 1990
- No. built: 548
- Builder: Jeanneau
- Role: Cruiser-Racer
- Name: Sun Fast 41

Boat
- Displacement: 16,094 lb (7,300 kg)
- Draft: 6.40 ft (1.95 m)

Hull
- Type: monohull
- Construction: fiberglass
- LOA: 40.85 ft (12.45 m)
- LWL: 32.74 ft (9.98 m)
- Beam: 12.93 ft (3.94 m)
- Engine: Yanmar 44 or 55 hp (33 or 41 kW) diesel engine

Hull appendages
- Keel: fin keel
- Ballast: 5,633 lb (2,555 kg)
- Rudder: spade-type rudder

Rig
- Rig type: Bermuda rig
- I foretriangle height: 51.18 ft (15.60 m)
- J foretriangle base: 15.09 ft (4.60 m)
- P mainsail luff: 44.95 ft (13.70 m)
- E mainsail foot: 14.11 ft (4.30 m)

Sails
- Sailplan: masthead sloop
- Mainsail area: 361 sq ft (33.5 m^{2})
- Jib/genoa area: 588 sq ft (54.6 m^{2})
- Spinnaker area: 1,251 sq ft (116.2 m^{2})
- Upwind sail area: 948 sq ft (88.1 m^{2})
- Downwind sail area: 1,611 sq ft (149.7 m^{2})

The Sun Fast 41 is a French sailboat that was designed by American Doug Peterson as a cruiser-racer and first built in 1990.

The Sun Fast 41 is part of the Sun Fast sailboat range and is a development of Peterson's 1984 Sun Legende 41 design.

== Production ==
The design was built by Jeanneau in France, from 1990 to 1994, with 548 boats completed, but it is now out of production.

== Design ==
The Sun Fast 41 is a recreational keelboat, built predominantly of fiberglass, with wood trim. The hull is solid fiberglass, with Kevlar reinforcement, while the deck is a fiberglass-balsa sandwich. It has a masthead sloop rig, with a deck-stepped mast, two sets of unswept spreaders and aluminum spars with stainless steel wire rigging. The hull has a raked stem, a reverse transom with steps to a swimming platform, an internally mounted spade-type rudder controlled by a wheel and a fixed fin keel with cast iron or lead ballast or optional keel and centerboard. The fin keel model displaces 16,094 lb (7,300 kg) and carries 5,633 lb (2,555 kg) of cast iron ballast or 6,900 lb (3,130 kg) of lead ballast, while the centerboard version displaces 16,226 lb (7,360 kg) and carries 6,878 lb (3,120 kg) of cast iron ballast.

The cast iron keel-equipped version of the boat has a draft of 6.40 ft (1.95 m), the lead keel-equipped version of the boat has a draft of 6.92 ft (2.11 m), while the centerboard-equipped version has a draft of 8.17 ft (2.49 m) with the centerboard extended and 4.92 ft (1.50 m) with it retracted, allowing operation in shallow water.

The boat is fitted with a Japanese Yanmar diesel engine of 44 or 55 hp (33 or 41 kW) for docking and maneuvering. The fuel tank holds 39.1 U.S. gallons (148 L; 32.6 imp gal) and the fresh water tank has a capacity of 92.7 U.S. gallons (351 L; 77.2 imp gal).

The design can be equipped with sleeping accommodation for as many as 12 people, but for cruising a typical arrangement is for six people. This includes a double "V"-berth in the bow cabin, a U-shaped settee and a straight settee in the main cabin and two aft cabins, each with a double berth. The galley is located on the port side at the companionway ladder. The galley is L-shaped and is equipped with a two-burner stove, an ice box and a double sink. A navigation station is opposite the galley, on the starboard side. The head is located just aft of the bow cabin on the port side and includes a shower. There are also sinks in each of the aft cabins. Cabin maximum headroom is 77 in (196 cm).

For sailing downwind the design may be equipped with a symmetrical spinnaker of 1,251 sq ft (116.2 m^{2}).

The design has a hull speed of 7.67 kn (14.20 km/h).

== Operational history ==
The boat was at one time supported by a class club that organized racing events, the Sun Fast Association.

== See also ==
- List of sailing boat types
