= Mini Ton class =

Mini Ton class was an offshore sailing class of the International Offshore Rule.

== Boats ==
Mini Ton class boats include:

- Aegean 234
- Everitt E Boat
- Fan 22
- Fox Terrier 22
- Everitt Glass Onion
- Intro 22
- Irwin Min-Ton
- Kiwi 22
- Limbo 6.6
- Mirage 5.5
- Monark 700
- Mystic Mini-Ton
- Ranger 22
- Show 22
- Sunshine 22
- Thomas Sonata

== See also ==
- Quarter Ton class
- Half Ton class
- Three-Quarter Ton class
- One Ton class
- Two Ton class
- Midget Ocean Racing Club
