= US Yachts US 27 =

1980s American recreational keelboat

Development
- Designer: Doug Peterson and Daryl Watson
- Location: United States
- Year: 1983
- Builder: US Yachts
- Role: Racer-Cruiser

Boat
- Displacement: 5,836 lb (2,647 kg)
- Draft: 5.17 ft (1.58 m)

Hull
- Type: monohull
- Construction: fiberglass
- LOA: 27.00 ft (8.23 m)
- LWL: 23.25 ft (7.09 m)
- Beam: 9.50 ft (2.90 m)
- Engine: Volvo diesel engine

Hull appendages
- Keel: fin keel
- Ballast: 2,024 lb (918 kg)
- Rudder: internally-mounted spade-type rudder

Rig
- Rig type: Bermuda rig
- I foretriangle height: 32.75 ft (9.98 m)
- J foretriangle base: 10.75 ft (3.28 m)
- P mainsail luff: 28.00 ft (8.53 m)
- E mainsail foot: 9.75 ft (2.97 m)

Sails
- Sailplan: masthead sloop
- Mainsail area: 136.50 sq ft (12.681 m^{2})
- Jib/genoa area: 176.03 sq ft (16.354 m^{2})
- Total sail area: 312.53 sq ft (29.035 m^{2})

The US Yachts US 27 is a recreational keelboat built by US Yachts in the United States, around 1983.

It is an unauthorized development of Doug Peterson's Chaser 29. The US 27 molds were later sold to Pearson Yachts and developed into the Triton 27 in 1984.

The fiberglass has a reverse transom, an internally mounted spade-type rudder controlled by a tiller. It has a draft of 5.17 ft (1.58 m) with the standard keel and 3.5 ft (1.1 m) with the optional shoal draft keel. It has a hull speed of 6.46 kn (11.96 km/h).

It has four berths, with a double "V"-berth, a U-shaped settee and drop-down dinette table in the main cabin on the port side. The galley is located on the starboard side amidships and is equipped with a two-burner stove, ice box and a sink. The enclosed head is located just aft of the bow cabin on the port side. Cabin headroom is 72 in (183 cm).

It has a masthead sloop rig.
