= Offshore Racing Congress =

The Offshore Racing Congress (ORC) is an international body for the sport of competitive sailing and is responsible for the establishment and maintenance of rating and classification standards used to define offshore, that is marine as opposed to inland, yacht racing handicap categories.

== Ratings and Classification ==
The ORC was established in 1969 to create a single international handicap standard to combine the two pre-existing dominant handicap standards - that of the Cruising Club of America which covered North and South Americas, and the standard of the Royal Ocean Racing Club for Europe and the Antipodes.

The combined ruleset, the International Offshore Rule or IOR, was initially successful. The ORC developed International Measurement System (IMS) in the early 1990s and it was widely used to the early 2000s. This made use of a Velocity prediction program or VPP. While still maintained, the IMS has been largely superseded by the Offshore Racing Congress Rule in its International and, simpler, Club forms. These more recent rule sets are based on the same VPP as the IMS. The VPP is used "to rate boats of different characteristics in size, hull and appendages shape and configuration, stability, rig and sails measurement, propeller installation and many other details affecting their theoretical speed". The organisation created the GP26, GP33 and GP42 classes based on a box rule in the 2010s.

Along with the IMS, ORC International and ORC Club, the ORC is also the sole authority recognized by the World Sailing for the administration of the ORC Grand Prix Classes Rules and the related Regulations, measurement and classes.

== ORC Publications ==
In addition to the IMS and ORC Rating Rules, the ORC also publishes "The ORC Championship Rules, Standard Notice of Race, Standard Sailing Instructions and ORC Classes" or 'Green Book', the VPP documentation and other software and related documentation as well as a number of technical data sets including their Stability and Hydrostatics Datasheet.

== Organisation ==
The ORC comprises a Congress and Officers, a number of Committees, Chief Measurers and Rating Offices.

=== Congress and Officers ===
The Congress' honorary President is currently King Harald V of Norway. Bruno Finzi has held the post of President since 2002. The congress includes national representatives and two from ISAF.

=== Committees ===
Apart from the general Management Committee, other committees cover "Offshore Classes & Events", "Race Management", "Special Regulations", "Measurement" and "Promotion & Development". General technical matters, including responsibility for the maintenance and development of the VPP and other software, are encompassed by the "International Technical Committee" (ITC), chaired by Andy Claughton. A number of working groups also exist.

=== Measurers and Rating Offices ===
The 'Central Rating Office' establishes delegated Rating Offices in each country with active offshore racing. Rating offices issue ORC International and ORC Club certificates and administer their national fleets by supervising the measurement and rating of the yachts. For countries where a national Rating Office is not established, the central ORC Rating office may provide support in issuing certificates and supervising measurement. A 'Chief Measurer' chairs the Measurement Committee. The current Chief Measurer is Zoran Grubiša. National Chief Measurers are established in each national Rating Office.

== Events ==
The ORC organizes multiple events, and the major ones can be grouped as follows:

- Current World Championship organised
  - ORCi World Championships
  - ORCi Two Person World Championship
- Former World Championship organised
  - Quarter Ton Cup
  - Half Ton Cup
  - Three Quarter Ton Cup
  - One Ton Cup
  - Two Ton Cup
  - IMS World Championships
  - ILC Maxi World Championship
  - IMS 30 World Championship
  - IMS 50 World Championship
  - IMS 500 World Championship
  - IMS 600 World Championship
  - IMS 670 World Championship
  - ISAF Offshore Team World Championship
- Continental Championships
  - European ORCi
  - European ORC Sportsboats
- National Championships
- Organised by other the following pinnacle events currently use the ORC Rating Systems

== See also ==
- International Rule
- Handicap (sailing)
