= One Ton class =

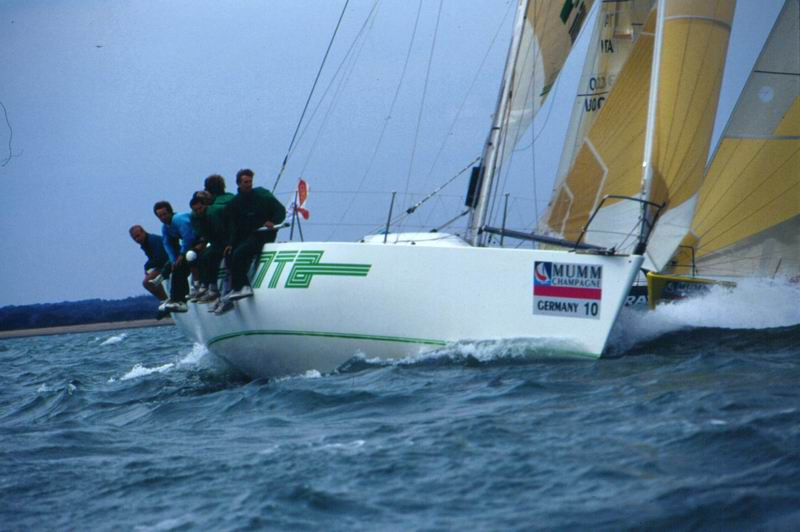
- One-tonner Pinta in 1993.

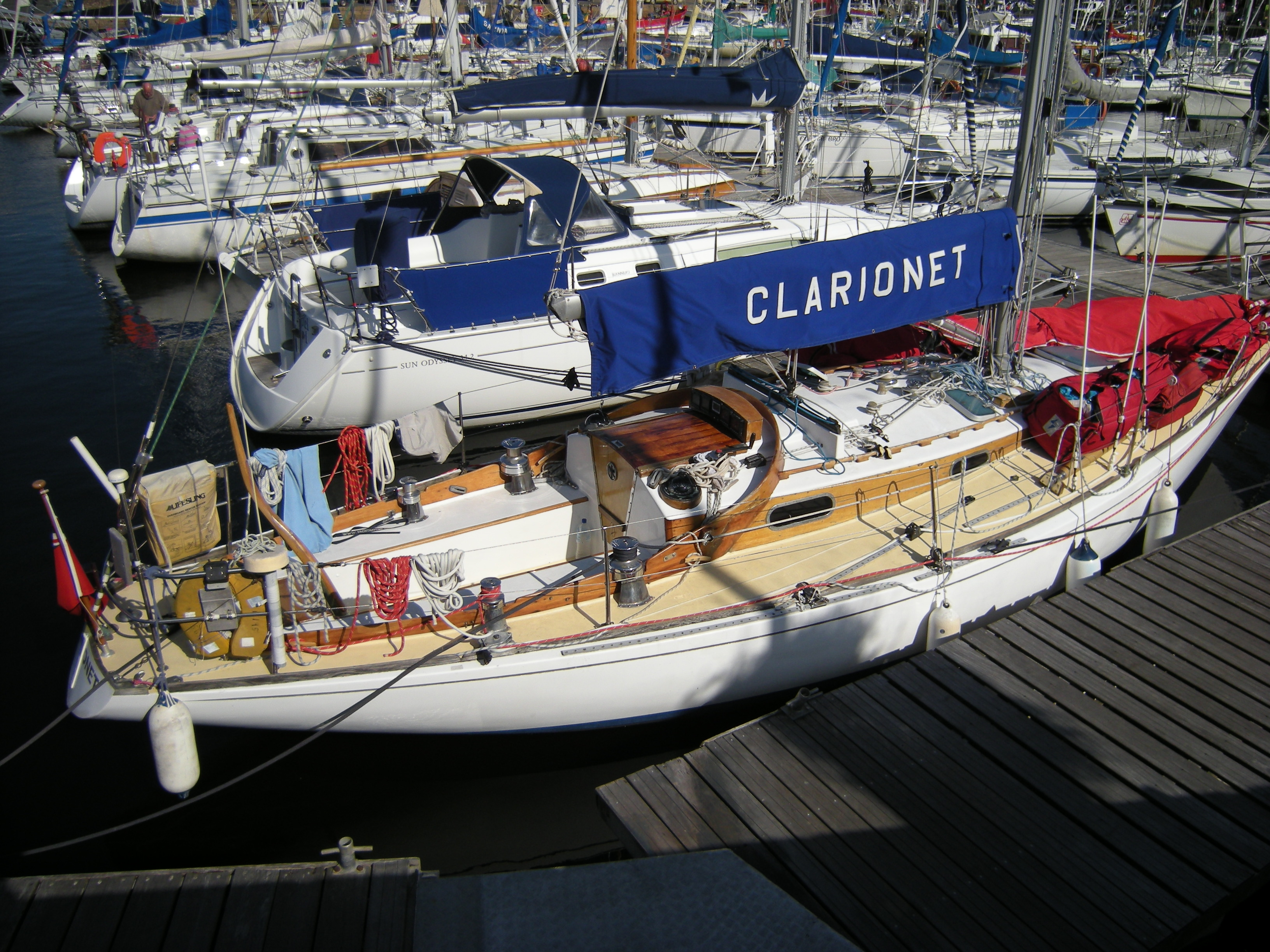
1960s one-tonner Clarionet in 2009.

One Ton class was an offshore sailing class, which raced for the One Ton Cup, of the RORC 22 foot rule between 1965 and 1970, and then the International Offshore Rule between 1971 and 1994. The IOR rated length was 27.5' from 1971 to 1982, then in order to match the minimum class of the Admiral's Cup, the rated length for the One Ton class increased to 30.55' from 1983 onwards.

As well as regional competitions, the class spawned national-level trophies such as the North American One Ton cup. It was reputed in 1994 by Yachting World as "the most competitive trophy" which has "had the greatest influence on offshore yacht racing design and techniques".

== See also ==
- Mini Ton class
- Quarter Ton class
- Half Ton class
- Three-Quarter Ton class
- Two Ton class
- Midget Ocean Racing Club
