= International Measurement System =

The International Measurement System (IMS) is a system of handicapping sailboats for the purpose of racing that replaced the earlier International Offshore Rule (IOR) system in the early 1990s. It is managed by the Offshore Racing Congress (ORC). In the sailing world it is usually referred to simply as 'IMS'.

== Synopsis ==
IMS was the first yacht racing rule developed around the central idea of a velocity prediction program (VPP). The VPP was a complex computer program that integrated continuous hullform information in order to predict a given boat's speed potential in a given wind velocity. Details on the VPP were openly available to the yachting community, in contrast to the earlier IOR system. Designers and boat owners much preferred this as they were able to design new yachts to maximise performance under the rule with a degree of certainty they had not enjoyed under the IOR rule. IMS is generally believed to have made significant leaps of progress forward from the IOR rule it displaced in terms of fairness and accuracy.

IMS racing declined seriously in the early 2000s. A raft of new technology developments in yacht design led to a situation where the very largest and most expensive yachts were able to gain a significant technology advantage which the rule was less able to account for. Smaller yacht owners began to feel unfairly disadvantaged under the rule and between 2003 and 2007 much handicap racing around the world changed to using the newer International Rating Certificate (IRC) rule.

However, an improved, revised version of IMS was developed over the years 2006-2008, and known as the Offshore Racing Congress (ORC) rule. As of 2008 some major sailing clubs around the world considered replacing IRC with ORC in their club activities, heralding a return to the IMS system in a more modern form.
