= Half Ton class =

Offshore sailing class

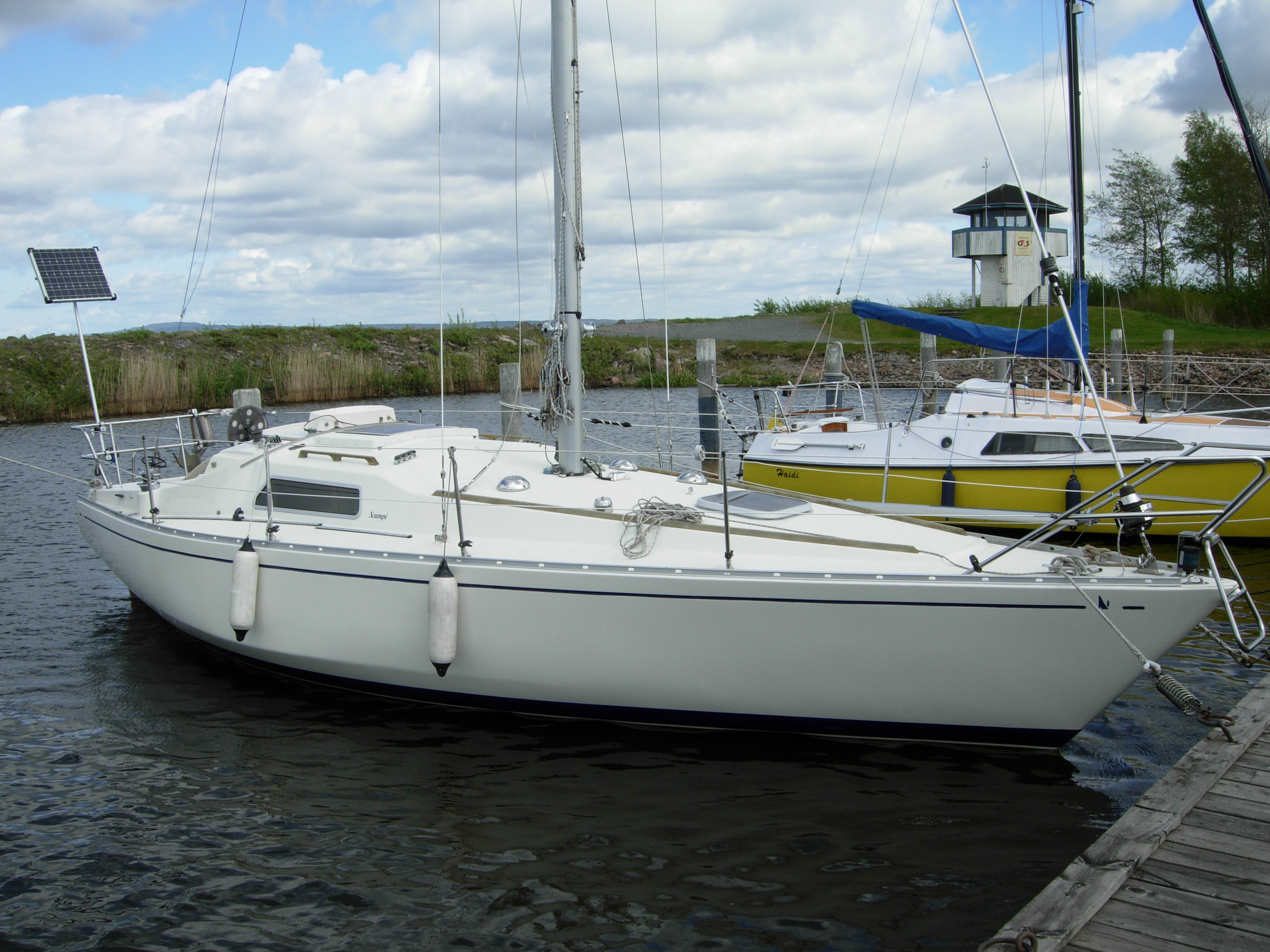
A Scampi boat, production version of the Half Ton Cup winner by Peter Norlin

Half Ton class was an offshore sailing class of the International Offshore Rule racing the Half Ton Cup between 1967 and 1993.

== History ==
In order that yachts of different types can race against each other, there are handicap rules which are applied to different boat designs. The Half Ton Class was created by the Offshore Racing Council for boats within the racing band not exceeding 22 feet. The ORC decided that the rule should "... permit the development of seaworthy offshore racing yachts.... The Council will endeavour to protect the majority of the existing IOR fleet from rapid obsolescence caused by ... developments which produce increased performance without corresponding changes in ratings..."

When first introduced the IOR rule was perfectly adequate for rating boats in existence at that time. However yacht designers naturally examined the rule to seize upon any advantage they could find, the most noticeable of which has been a reduction in displacement and a return to fractional rigs.

After 1993, when the IOR Mk.III rule reached it termination due to lack of people building new boats, the rule was replaced by the CHS (Channel) Handicap system which in turn developed into the IRC system now used.

The IRC handicap system operates by a secret formula which tries to develop boats which are a 'cruising type' of relatively heavy boats with good internal accommodation. It tends to penalise boats with excessive stability or excessive sail area.

== Competitions ==
The most significant events for the Half Ton Class has been the annual Half Ton Cup which was sailed under the IOR rules until 1993. More recently this has been replaced with the Half Ton Classics Cup. The venue of the event moved from continent to continent with over-representation on French or British ports. In latter years the event is held Biannually. Initially it was proposed to hold events in Ireland, Britain and France by rotation. However it was the Belgians who took the ball and ran with it. The Class is now managed from Belgium. The next event will be held in Ireland for the second time in Kinsale, Co. Cork.

Numerous IOR-rated half-tonne boats during the period this class competed in also raced in classic offshore races, including the world renowned Sydney to Hobart.

== Half Ton Cup ==
The Half Ton class racing the Half Ton Cup between 1967 and 1993.

== Half Ton Classics Cup ==
The idea of holding a Half Ton Classics Cup first arose at Cork Week in 2000 when the Crew of 'Sibelius' (FRA) including Didier Dardot and his wife and the crew of 'SpACE Odyssey' (IRL) including Shay Moran, Enda Connellan, Terry Madigan and Vincent Delany agreed that it would be a great idea to organiser a bi-annual event for Half Tonners under the IRC handicap system with the venue rotating between France, England and Ireland. In fact Didier Dardot was unable to persuade La Trinite or any other French clubs to organise the first event. However the Half Ton enthusiasts of Nieupoort organised the first event in Belgium. By 2017 it was evident that only expensively optimised boats were capable of winning the Half Ton Classics Cup. These boats were stripped down to the original hulls, with new decks, deck hardware, keels, rigs and sails. Owners of boats which were not so rebuilt contented themselves with the status of the 'mid fleet club'. Thus numbers competing declined.

=== Criteria ===
- Boats must have been designed as IOR boats during the period 1967–1992.
- Boats may be modified, but the hulls must be original.
- Keels and rudders may be modified.
- Rigs may be modified.
- Boats race under the IRC handicap system.

=== Past winners ===
- 2003. 24 entries—Nieuwpoort, General Tapioca, Berret prototype 1978, timber, fractional rig, fin and bulb keel
- 2005. 30 entries—Dinard, Ginko, Mauric production 1968, Super Challenger, masthead rig
- 2007. 25 entries—Dún Laoghaire, Henry Lloyd Harmony, Humphreys prototype 1980, timber, swept-back fractional rig
- 2009. 23 entries—Nieuwpoort, General Tapioca, Berret prototype 1978, timber, fractional rig, fin and bulb keel
- 2011. 38 entries—Cowes, Chimp, Berret prototype 1978, timber, swept-back fractional rig, 9.4m, o/a
- 2013. 29 entries—(Boulogne sur Mer), Checkmate, Humphreys production MGHS30, 1985 Epoxy sandwich construction?, swept-back fractional rig, fin keel without bulb (similar to Henry Lloyd Harmony)

From 2013, Championship held annually:

- 2014. 22 entries—St.Quay Portrieux, Brittany, Swuzzlebubble, Bruce Farr 1977, two-off plywood construction, much modified by Mark Mills with new low V.C.G. lead keel without a bulb, and with laminar-flow keel section with hollow trailing edge, swept-back fractional rig with wide shroud base, non-overlapping jibs etc
- 2015. 22 entries—(Nieuwpoort, Belgium), Checkmate, Humphreys production MGHS30, 1985, seriously modified with new cockpit and modifications listed above
- 2016. 20 entries (Falmouth, Cornwall, England) Swuzzlebubble, Bruce Farr, 1977
- 2017. 21 entries (Kinsale, Co. Cork, Ireland) Swuzzlebubble, Bruce Farr 1977 modified 2015? Owned by Phil Plumtree
- 2018. 19 entries (Nieuwpoort, Belgium) Checkmate XV highly modified Humphreys MGHS30 owned by Dave Cullen, Howth Yacht Club

- 2020. Half Ton Classics Cup cancelled due to SARS-CoV-2 pandemic

== Designers ==
The most successful or popular designs were prepared by the following designers

- David Andrieu (FRA)
- Georg Nissen (DEU) Play and Loss
- Laurie Davidson (NZL)
- Doug Peterson(USA)
- Jean Berret (FRA)—Chimp etc.
- Tony Castro.(POR)
- Ed Dubois (GBR)
- Bruce Farr (NZ)—Swuzzlebubble etc.
- Jacques Fauroux (FRA)
- Groupe Finot (FRA)
- Giles Gahinet (FRA)
- Ron Holland (Ireland)
- Michel Joubert (FRA)—SpAce Odyssey etc..
- Georg Nissen
- Peter Norlin (SWE)—Scampi etc..
- Rob Humphreys (GBR)—MGHS30 etc.
- Stephen Jones (GBR)
- Andre Mauric (FRA)
- Bernt Andersson (SWE)
- Håkan Södergren (SWE)
- David Thomas (GBR)
- Van de Stadt (NED)
- Judel Vrolijk (NED)
- Hugh Welbourn (GBR)—Chia Chia
- Paul Whiting (NZ)
- Ron Swanson (Aus)

== Boats ==
Boats designed for the competition include:

- Aloa 29
- Aubin Armagnac
- Balanzone 1/2 Ton
- Ballad 30
- Banner 28
- Beneteau First 30
- Beneteau First 30 E
- Bess 1/2 Ton
- Blue Dabe 32
- Brise De Mer 31
- Bristol 28
- Cal 9.2
- Cal T/2
- C&C 1/2 Ton
- C&C 29
- Chance 30-30
- Chaser 29
- Club 86
- Columbia 9.6
- Comfort 30
- Contention 30
- Competition 1000
- Delph 28
- Dione 98
- Duck 31
- Dufour Safari 27
- East Coast 31
- Elan 31
- Eliminator 1/2 Ton
- Elite 30
- Elizabethan 30
- Elvstrom 32
- Evelyn 32 1/2 Ton
- Farr 914
- Farr 920
- Farr 1/2 Ton
- Feeling 850
- Feria 9M
- Finn Flyer 31
- Formula 28
- G&S 30
- Gib'Sea 30
- Gib'Sea 90 Plus
- Golden Shamrock 30
- Guy 33
- HB 31
- Hawkfarm 28
- Hustler 32
- Hydro 28
- Irwin 1/2 Ton
- Irwin 30 Competition
- IW-31
- Javelin 30
- Jeanneau Rush 31
- Jeanneau Sun Fast 1/2 Ton
- Jeanneau Sun Light 30
- Joker S30
- Jouet 920
- Kalik 30
- Kiwi 30
- Maestro 31
- Mallard 9M
- Mamba 31
- Martin 29
- MG-HS30
- Mistral 33
- Mistress 32
- Nicholson 1/2 Ton
- Northern 29
- North Star 1000
- PJ-30 1/2 Ton
- Puma 26
- Ranger 28
- S&S 6.6
- San Juan 30
- Scampi 30-2
- Seafarer 29
- She 31
- Show 29
- Sinner 28
- Spencer 30
- Stag 29
- Starlight 30
- Super Challenger

Swanson 30

- Thompson 31
- Trapper 950
- Waarschip 870
- Westerly GK 29
- X-95
- Yankee 28
- Ziggurat 916

== See also ==
- Mini Ton class
- Quarter Ton class
- Three-Quarter Ton class
- One Ton class
- Two Ton class
- Midget Ocean Racing Club
