= WoodenBoat =

American boating magazine

- Categories: Boating
- Frequency: Bi-monthly
- Founded: 1974
- Country: United States
- Based in: Brooklin, Maine
- Language: English
- Website: www.woodenboat.com
- ISSN: 0095-067X

WoodenBoat is an American magazine written for owners, admirers, builders, and designers of wooden boats. The company's headquarters is located in Brooklin, Maine. It was founded in September 1974 by Jon Wilson, a former boatbuilder. Wilson sold his Alden ketch, using $11,000 of the proceeds along with $3,500 from a loan to start the magazine.

On January 1, 2022, WoodenBoat was acquired by Matt Murphy and Andrew Breece, the editor and publisher, respectively, of the magazine.
