= Three-Quarter Ton class =

Three-Quarter Ton class was an offshore sailing class of the International Offshore Rule racing the Three-Quarter Ton Cup between 1974 and 1994; boats rated below 24,5.

== Boats ==
- C&C 3/4 Ton
- DB-1
- DB-2
- SHE 36
- UFO 34
- X-102

== See also ==
- Mini Ton class
- Quarter Ton class
- Half Ton class
- One Ton class
- Two Ton class
- Midget Ocean Racing Club
