= Quarter Ton class =

Quarter Ton Class is an offshore sailing class of the International Offshore Rule racing the Quarter Ton Cup between 1967 and 1996 and from 2005 till now. The class is sailed by smaller keelboats of similar size and is likely the world's most produced keelboat class.

== History ==
This sailing class has held world championships from 1967 until 1997. In 2005 there was a revival of the quarter ton class started in Cowes and they sailed under IRC Quarter Ton Cup rules from 2005 until now.

An annual Dutch Quarterton Cup under ORC was started in 2013. In France and Ireland there are also races for Quarter Ton boats.

== Boats ==
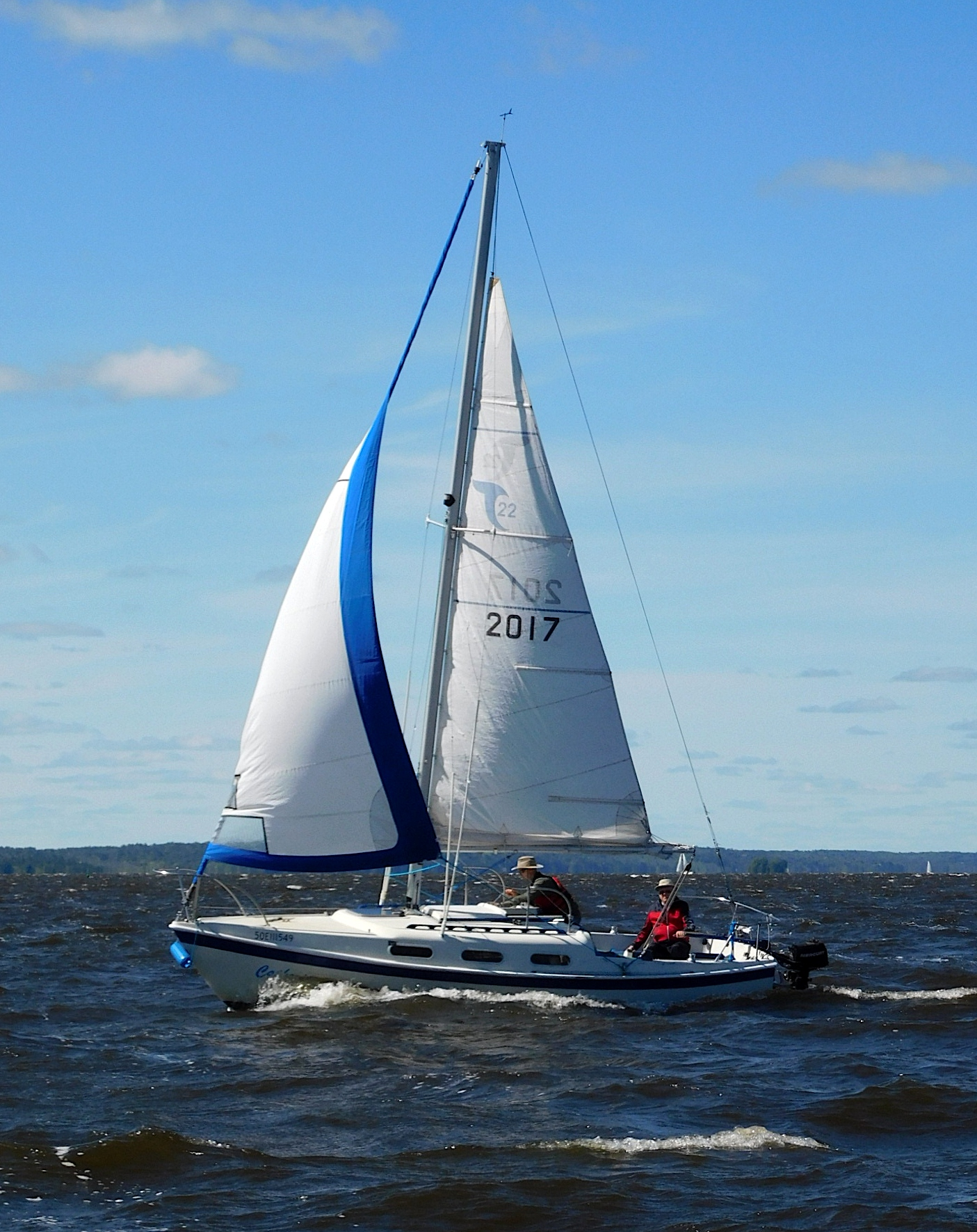
A Tanzer 22 Quarter Ton class racer

- Accent 26
- Albin 79
- Cal T/4
- D&M 22
- Ericson 25
- Farr 727
- Northern 1/4 Ton
- North Star 500
- Ranger 23
- San Juan 24
- Santana 525
- Tanzer 22
- Yamaha 26
- Yankee 26

== See also ==
- Mini Ton class
- Half Ton class
- Three-Quarter Ton class
- One Ton class
- Midget Ocean Racing Club
