= International Rating Certificate =

The International Rating Certificate (IRC) is a system of handicapping sailboats and yachts for the purpose of racing. It is managed by the Royal Ocean Racing Club (RORC) in the United Kingdom through their dedicated Rating Office, and the Union Nationale pour la Course au Large (UNCL) in France.

The IRC rule is not published, meaning the only bodies capable of calculating an IRC rating are the RORC Rating Office and UNCL Centre de Calcul in Paris (they are joint owners of the rule). This prevents designers from attempting to design 'to the rule'. The earlier IOR was published, and often amended, resulting in widespread criticism for several reasons. Firstly, as the rule effectively dictated the nature of boat designs, amendments to the rule could result in older designs gaining less favourable ratings compared to their real world speed, making racing competitively more expensive. Also, the pressure to produce designs which performed well under the rule resulted in designers producing yachts with certain dimensions intentionally extreme, in order to gain an unfairly favourable rating. The production of yachts which were excessively light and beamy - what became the classic 'diamond' plan form of the IOR - was believed to impact safety, and was cited as a factor in the 1979 Fastnet race disaster. In theory, IRC avoids these problems.

IRC can apply a rating to any single or two-masted ballasted monohull yacht. It considers such features as asymmetric spinnakers, carbon masts, canting keels, and water ballast, all of which have been permitted for several years. Furthermore, the rule is reviewed annually in light of new developments and trends in past results. On this front, RORC and UNCL seek and actively welcome input and comment from the users. The rule has since been developed to rate modern, light boats more fairly.

IRC permits and encourages owner declared measurement and this policy will be maintained for the future, although some clubs and areas have always insisted that locally they should measure boats.

There are also 'Endorsed' IRC ratings which require RORC or UNCL, as appropriate, to be satisfied as to the correctness of the rated data, generally by measurement by appointed measurers. Race Committees may require endorsed certificates for some events. Also, an IRC measurement manual is available on the IRC website https://ircrating.org along with simplified measurement guidance to assist with local measurement if required.

Boat classes/models for which IRC Standards have been set in terms of LH, overhangs, empty weight, beam and draft measurements only. Upon applying for base ratings (non-endorsed), one may elect to have standard overhang dimensions and a class weight used towards their IRC Ratings. Racers then need to submit rig, sail, ... to complete the application process. These standard overhang and displacement values reference the lightest boat in class.

IRC Rule and the information contained here is published with permission from the RORC Rating Office (Seahorse Rating Ltd).

== History ==
Originally called Channel Handicap, the rule was developed in 1983 at a time when there was a strong decline in the turnout for racing at the then predominant IOR (International Offshore Rule). The British RORC and the French UNCL, who jointly developed the rule, saw it as a means to get the "average club sailor" involved in racing, in the hope that they would subsequently upgrade their boat to participate under the IOR rule, or possibly the IMS handicapping system if that became more established.

The key people in its initial development were Keith Ludlow, Jonathan Hudson and Jean Sans, and then Tim Thornton took over the RORC side of things in the final development of the rule and its subsequent launch.

The rule was designed to favour heavy cruising boats with lower sail areas, dissuading more extreme racing yachts coming in to Channel Handicap. It was also designed to use the minimum number of measurements, in contrast to both the IOR and IMS, and to have owners measure their own boats, to make it simple and economic to implement.

It quickly became popular, and even more so when the rule was extended to include day sailing keelboats, extending from the origin need for cruising style accommodation and more stringent safety equipment for sailing offshore. An attempt was also made to extend it to include multihulls, though this failed due to the political differences between the monohull and multihull sailors and their clubs.

It quickly outgrew the Channel in its reach, and in 2000 was renamed IRC. In 2003 it was recognised as an international rule by ISAF. Racing under IRC has become more competitive over the years, and it is used in hundred of clubs races, open events and the major offshore classic races around the world.
