= Royal Ocean Racing Club =

Coordinates: 51.5059°N 0.1405°W

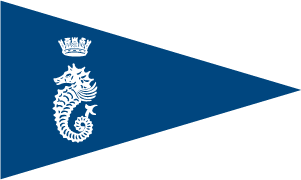

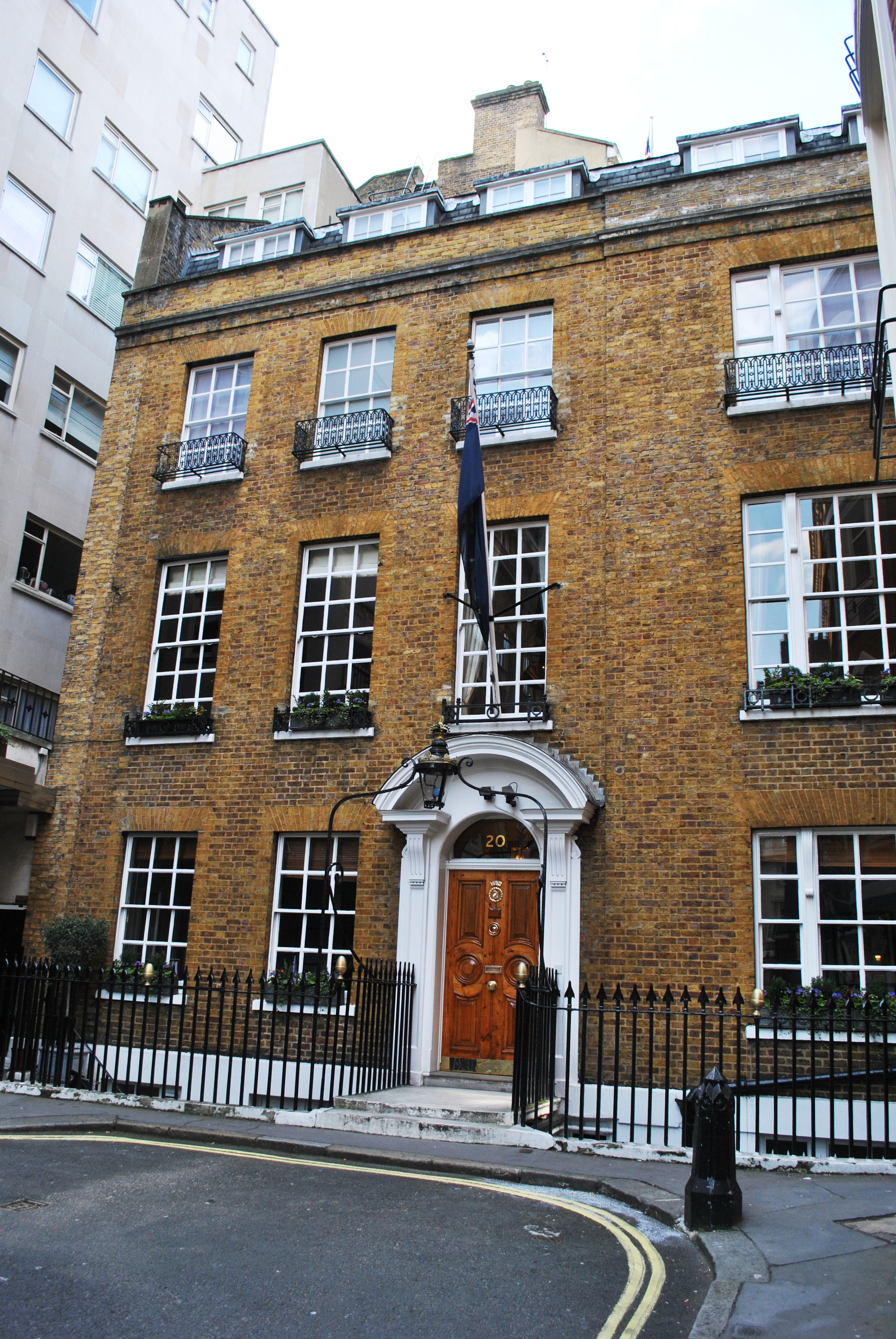
- Type: yacht club
- Genre: Yachting enthusiasts
- Founded: 1925
- Headquarters: 20 St James's Place, London, United Kingdom
- Website: www.rorc.org

The Royal Ocean Racing Club is a club in London with a further clubhouse and office in Cowes, Isle of Wight. It was established in 1925 as the Ocean Racing Club, as a result of a race to the Fastnet Rock from Cowes, finishing in Plymouth. It received royal approval by King George V in November 1931 since when it has been known as the Royal Ocean Racing Club.

RORC was founded to encourage long distance yacht racing and the design, building and navigation of sailing vessels in which speed and seaworthiness are combined.

== Rating Systems ==
In co-operation with the offshore racing department of the Yacht Club de France, RORC is responsible for the International Rating Certificate (IRC), the principal international handicap system for yacht racing.

== Events ==
The RORC is the principal organiser of offshore yacht races in the United Kingdom. It runs its own offshore series consisting of multiple races around the English Channel. In addition, it holds inshore racing within the Solent, primarily the Easter Regatta and IRC Nationals.

The following pinnacle events are also run by the RORC:

- Bi-Annual Fastnet Race
- Bi-Annual Admiral's Cup
- Quadrennial RORC Round Britain and Ireland Race

More recently it has helped establish international races away from the United Kingdom with the assistance of local clubs:

- RORC Caribbean 600 Race,
- RORC Transatlantic Race
- RORC Baltic Sea Race

== Clubhouses ==
=== London ===
The club has traditionally been based in St James's Place in Mayfair London.

=== Cowes ===
In 2014 the Royal Corinthian Yacht Club of Cowes merged with RORC giving the RORC a more visible presence in Cowes where the majority of its Offshore Races start on the line of the Royal Yacht Squadron. The use of the building itself as a yacht club was established in 1948 by yachtsman Tiny Mitchell.

=== Other Offices ===
RORC Rating Office is based in Lymington and the race management team is located at the RORC Cowes Clubhouse
