= Performance Handicap Racing Fleet =

Handicapping system used for yacht racing

Performance Handicap Racing Fleet (PHRF) is a handicapping system used for yacht racing in North America. It allows dissimilar classes of sailboats to be raced against each other. The aim is to cancel out the inherent advantages and disadvantages of each class of boats, so that results reflect crew skill rather than equipment superiority.

PHRF is used mainly for larger sailboats (i.e., 7 meters and above). For dinghy racing, the Portsmouth yardstick handicapping system is more likely to be used.

The handicap number assigned to a class of yachts is based on the yacht's speed relative to a theoretical yacht with a rating of 0. A yacht's handicap, or rating, is the number of seconds per mile traveled that the yacht in question should be behind the theoretical yacht. Most boats have a positive PHRF rating, but some very fast boats have a negative PHRF rating. If Boat A has a PHRF rating of 15 and Boat B has a rating of 30 and they compete on a 1 mile course, Boat A should finish approximately 15 seconds in front of Boat B. Results are adjusted for handicap by the race committee after all competitors have finished.

A variant of PHRF racing is called a pursuit race, commonly referred to as a reverse handicap, where boats start in reverse PHRF order with the starting times staggered based on the PHRF ratings. In theory, all boats will arrive at the finish line at the same time, which can make for an exciting finish. This means that the boats cross the finish line in order of placement in the race.

== The Rating System ==
PHRF handicaps are assigned by individuals or committees associated with specific fleets. Handicaps are assigned to a given production class considering predominant local conditions and the handicapper’s experience in handicapping similar boats. These ratings are based on observed performance and any requisite adjustments generally become evident after 5-10 races have been sailed. Scoring options include Time-on-Distance or Time-on-Time.

While handicaps are assigned locally, US Sailing provides certain standards and guidelines to maintain a degree of consistency between fleets. Additionally, as a member benefit, US Sailing develops the PHRF Fleet Handicap Book– a compilation of yacht base handicaps by class from more than 60 PHRF Fleets throughout North America listing over 5000 classes. The Offshore Office also offers administrative and handicapping services to participating PHRF Fleets. The term “Performance Handicap Racing Fleet (PHRF)” is protected by copyright for use by US Sailing and sanctioned regional fleets.

== Local Rules ==
Each region has its own variation on PHRF rules and ratings, based on local conditions. Here is an example of the Northern California PHRF Base Rating Report SAMPLE, the base rating is listed by boat in alphabetical order. The following is a sample of the Northern California rules for determining PHRF SAMPLE.

If a class of yachts is strongly outperforming their assigned rating, the PHRF committee of a region can adjust the handicap as they see appropriate. Hence PHRF is an observational rule as opposed to the IMS pure measurement rule. This prevents classes of yacht within a region from obtaining mistakenly favorable PHRF ratings and compromising the competitive nature of a fleet. All regions have slightly differing procedures for making changes but all have the same objective - keeping the racing fair for all.

== Individual boats ==
The process of determining the PHRF for an individual boat begins with the regional PHRF rating, then adjustments are made for the individual attributes of the boat such as: modifications to the rig, the size of the largest foresail (jib or genoa), the size of the spinnakers, type of keel (full, fin, wing etc.), the number of blades on the propeller, and the style of the propeller (fixed, folding, feathering). Significant modifications to the mainsail can cause penalties.

== Flaws ==
No rating rule is perfect and all have flaws. Alleged flaws to the PHRF rating system include:

An assumption that a rated boat is in Bristol racing condition - with a clean bottom, new sails, and an experienced crew. This assumption excludes those with less financial resources and sailing experience from the winners circle and discourages many boats from racing. PHRF shares this flaw with all sail racing rating systems, as those utilizing mathematical computation models also assume shapes are perfect, as designed - not worn, dirty, blown out, sagging, or deliberately altered.

PHRF is often viewed as political since the empirically based calculations are adjusted by historical performance, and rating values can be challenged to a committee of judges. The perception of it being political is based largely upon the requirement to follow a formal dispute process, which many find intimidating and creates a bias to those willing to put in the effort to present their case.

Design characteristics of boats yield different performance characteristics in various seas and winds. PHRF does not address these differences, which can especially have an impact in races run over a distance, without variety in points of sail and occur within a time period where weather and sea conditions do not change. Some would claim that this means it is possible to predict which boats will do well in certain conditions, most especially where design characteristics are extremely different. An example would be a light displacement, planing hull versus a heavy displacement non-planing hull. To mitigate this, as with other rating systems, PHRF suggests that race organizers assign boats with similar design in their fleet divisions. This reduces the planing boat vs heavy displacement variable. Typically fleets are split into similar handicap number ranges, which exposes the wind condition/design problem. Where actual fleet performance history does not exist, fleets with similar design characteristics must be utilized and PHRF can skew to favor larger boats with longer waterlines until true historical performance is established.

== Advantages ==
PHRF is owned by the United States Sailing Association, the national governing body for the sport of sailing, whereas other offshore rating systems are owned by small conglomerates of high powered sailing clubs.

Actual historical performance is verifiable, fully disclosed, and comprehensible to most competitors. Sail racers can validate the measure through seasons of competition, where other boats of same or similar construction are available to measure and compare. Furthermore, when an individual boat or fleet demonstrates performance beyond that of their rating, the performance history changes, as does the rating.

Rating systems which utilize a "proprietary" algorithm are often maligned by competitors who see hiding the science as a means to unfairly skew ratings to individuals with the power to influence the algorithm. While the PHRF dispute process was argued to favor only those willing to pursue it; there is a regional and a national appeal mechanism to question the validity of a rating.
