= International Offshore Rule =

The International Offshore Rule (IOR) was a measurement rule for racing sailboats. The IOR evolved from the Cruising Club of America (CCA) rule for racer/cruisers and the Royal Ocean Racing Club (RORC) rule.

== Rule context - past and present rating systems ==
The IOR was superseded (in the early 1990s) by the International Measurement System (IMS) and CHS (since renamed IRC). While some IOR yachts race at club level under IRC in more or less their original form, others had major surgery to make them competitive within the new rules.

=== Rule components ===
The IOR concentrated on hull shape with length, beam, freeboard and girth measurements, foretriangle, mast and boom measurements, and stability with an inclination test. Additionally, the IOR identified features which were dangerous, or it couldn't fairly rate, and penalized or prohibited them. The measurements and penalties were used to compute the handicap number, called an IOR rating, in feet. The higher the rating, the faster the boat was deemed to be able to sail. A typical IOR 40 footer (a one tonner) rated 30.55 feet.

The IOR rule encouraged wide short boats with limited stability. A narrow waterline and large beam on deck, combined with a high centre of gravity, meant that crew weight provided a significant proportion of stability at small heel angles, and boats had a relatively low angle of vanishing stability. This developed into the situation about 1977 when the boats winning in most smaller IOR categories (up to the half tonners - about 10m LOA) had all internal ballast, often with an unballasted daggerboard. The managers of the rule realised that this was not a suitable direction for seaworthy yachts, and heavily penalised boats with lifting keels, but not before the 1979 Fastnet race ended in disaster. Writes John Rousmaniere:

In the '70s, the IOR helped produce a new breed of racing and racing-cruising boat that was little more than a big, wide dinghy with a stability range as low as 90 degrees (meaning it would capsize completely when heeled only that far). The waves in the Fastnet storm were big enough to knock down a few 50-footers, and they smashed over a great many smaller boats that then capsized and stayed upside down until other steep waves slapped their keels and levered them back upright. Good work led to the new IMS rule, which turned out boats that, while fast, resist capsize to beyond 120 degrees. The 1998 Sydney to Hobart Yacht Race had conditions at least as bad as the 1979 Fastnet's, but in that 115-boat fleet, only three percent of the boats were reported to have rolled upside down and 18 percent put their masts in the water—against 24 percent and 33 percent in the Fastnet storm.

Apart from the girth measurements, all measurements were basically point measurements. This meant that the hull was often locally distorted to maximise or minimise a measurement locally, with minimal effect to the surrounding hull. This gave a characteristic bumped look to many boats, particularly at the point of maximum beam and in the stern. Also, as stability was only measured at very low heel angles (less than 5 degrees), boats were designed with a very narrow waterline and low stability in measurement trim, but a hull form that gained stability with the weight of the crew and other equipment, and with increasing angles of heel. Low stability was encouraged (up to a point) because the initial assumption was that low stability indicated a well fitted out interior, and so more of a cruising boat than a stripped out racer.

Secondary design factors included engine and propeller rating factors, minimum internal accommodation levels, safety regulations, and a limit on the number of sails carried on board. Later on, crew limits were introduced, and limits on the use of exotic materials, such as carbon fibre and Nomex, and also scantlings for hull structural design developed by the American Bureau of Shipping.

=== Practical implications for sailors and owners ===
In a handicap race, the IOR length was used to compute a time allowance. In Europe this was calculated on the duration of the race, in seconds per hour, known as Time on Time, whereas in the USA they preferred to base it on the length of the race, as seconds per mile, known as Time on Distance. Time on Distance is easier to calculate at any point in the race, but can cause significant anomalies in tidal waters as the distance sailed through the water can differ significantly from the distance over the ground, due to the effect of the tide.

The IOR rule was also used to define level rating classes, where each class had a maximum IOR rating, and the first boat to finish was the winner, with no handicapping. The first of these was the One Ton class, so named because there was a spare trophy from the defunct One Ton rating class, the One Ton Cup, and this then spawned the Mini Ton, 1/4 Ton, 1/2 Ton, 3/4 Ton and Two Ton classes, as well as unofficial 50-footer, ULDB 70, and Maxi classes. The official classes each had an annual world championships.

The IOR was run by the ITC, or International Technical Committee, of the Offshore Racing Congress, chaired between 1979 and 1987 by the late Gary Mull of San Francisco. As with all published handicapping formulae, there was an ongoing game between the designers finding ways of designing boats that took advantage of shortcomings in the measurement system and handicapping formulae, and the rule makers closing the loopholes to ensure fair racing and a reasonable competitive life for the boats. As the racing became more competitive, the rate of change in the rule accelerated, and also the boats at the top of the fleet became stripped out racing machines that performed well but were expensive and also difficult to sail, and this resulted in a loss of popularity. However even if club sailors could not compete against the top boats, the IOR did generate a reasonably level playing field across the sailing spectrum, with club sailors buying production race boats or custom boats past their prime, and moving up to more competitive boats as they wanted to sail up the fleet. Towards the end of its life the IOR had become a stable rule, but by then it had a reputation of changing too often, and this sowed the seeds for its successors. IMS was introduced as a more scientific rule for racing yachts, driven by the US, whereas Channel Handicap was introduced in 1983 by the RORC as a simple club level rule that would hopefully feed people into IOR racing - though in fact it proved to be the final nail in the coffin for the IOR rule.

=== Age, compensation and competitiveness ===
Boats had a short competitive life for two reasons: the overall increase in performance of newer boats due to better design and construction, and also the effect of changes in the handicapping rules. The first was catered for by an age allowance, which reduced the handicap of boats as they got older. The second was catered for to some extent by grandfather clauses in the IOR rules, but this did not cater for designer's ability to design to the rule increasing with every year. This, plus the annual rule changes, gave boats a competitive life of no more than 2 or 3 years at the top level.

Initially designs were heavy displacement, with a fine, often V-shaped stern as well as a fine bow. These were powerful boats for sailing to windward, but had limited performance offwind as well as often having an alarming tendency to broach - designers included Sparkman & Stephens and Dick Carter. Then Ron Holland's quarter-tonner Eygthene began the next phase of increasingly lightweight boats with fuller sterns giving more of a wedge shape, and a change from masthead rig to a fractional rig. This dinghy influence gave much faster performance reaching and downwind, and although windward performance was not as good, it improved as the designs developed. The ultimate in this stage was the various lightweight centerboard designs with internal ballast, but these were not sufficiently seaworthy for offshore racing and so were penalised so heavily that they were effectively banned. Designs then moved to a more moderate displacement, and as race courses moved from offshore racing with plenty of reaching towards windward/leeward round the cans, racing designs became narrower and less powerful but more easily driven.

A good reference on the IOR Rule, including an analysis of the different formulae and measurements used, can be found in the book The Offshore Yacht.

== Development, simplification and revitalised racing ==
Today, modern "maxis" are simply limited to 30m (98'), encouraging improvements in boat design, and exciting sailing, and not simply rule modification, as still plagues the America's Cup competition.

The introduction of VPPs, or Velocity Prediction Programs, morphed the science of yacht performance measurement. Inherent to the IOR was the concept of a measurement officer taking discrete hull measurements and the IOR formula assumed the hull lines behaved continuously between measurement points. The IMS took the actual hull lines and analysed their continuum, essentially eliminating funny bumps or hollows in the ensuing yachts and generally rendering much cleaner, faster lines that were far more exciting, safer to sail, and had higher resale value.

== See also ==
- Midget Ocean Racing Club
