= Sleeping berth =

Type of bed in a vehicle

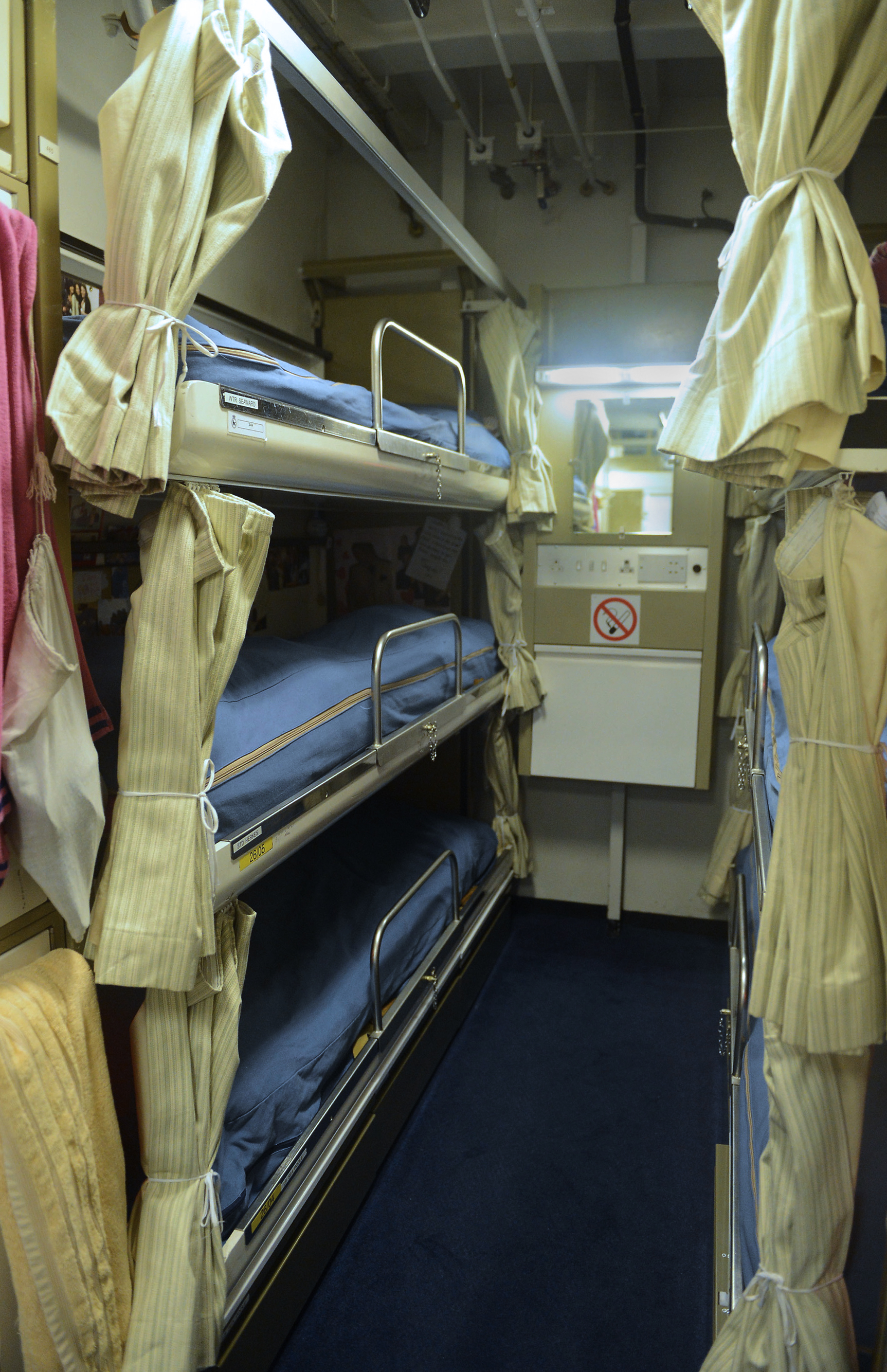
A berth on a Royal Navy vessel

A sleeping berth is a bed or sleeping accommodation on vehicles. Space accommodations have contributed to certain common design elements of berths.

== Beds in boats or ships ==
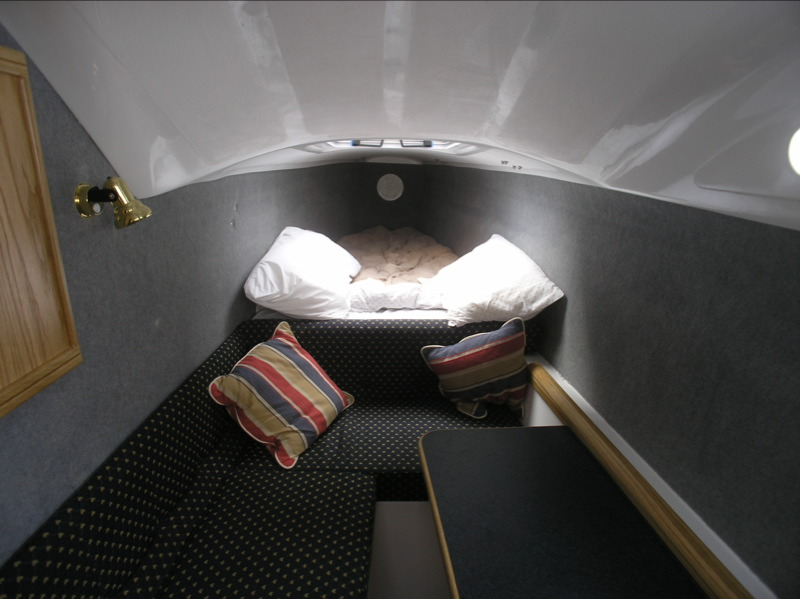
A bed on a boat is sometimes known as a berth

While beds on large ships are little different from those on shore, the lack of space on smaller yachts means that bunks must be fit in wherever possible. Some of these berths have specific names:

=== V-berth ===
Frequently, yachts have a bed in the extreme forward end of the hull (usually in a separate cabin called the forepeak). Because of the shape of the hull, this bed is basically triangular, though most also have a triangular notch cut out of the middle of the aft end, splitting it partially into two separate beds and making it more of a V shape, hence the name. This notch can usually be filled in with a detachable board and cushion, creating something more like a double bed (though with drastically reduced space for the feet; 12 in or 300 mm wide is typical). The term "V-berth" is not widely used in the UK; instead, the cabin as a whole (the forepeak) is usually referred to.

=== Settee berth ===
The archetypal layout for a small yacht has seats running down both sides of the cabin, with a table in the middle. At night, these seats can usually be used as beds. Because the ideal ergonomic distance between a seat-back and its front edge (back of the knee) makes for a rather narrow bed, good settee berths will have a system for moving the back of the settee out of the way; this can reveal a surprisingly wide bunk, often running right out to the hull side underneath the lockers. If they are to be used at sea, settee berths must have lee-cloths to prevent the user falling out of bed. Sometimes the settee forms part of a double bed for use in harbor, often using detachable pieces of the table and extra cushions. Such beds are not usually referred to as settee berths.

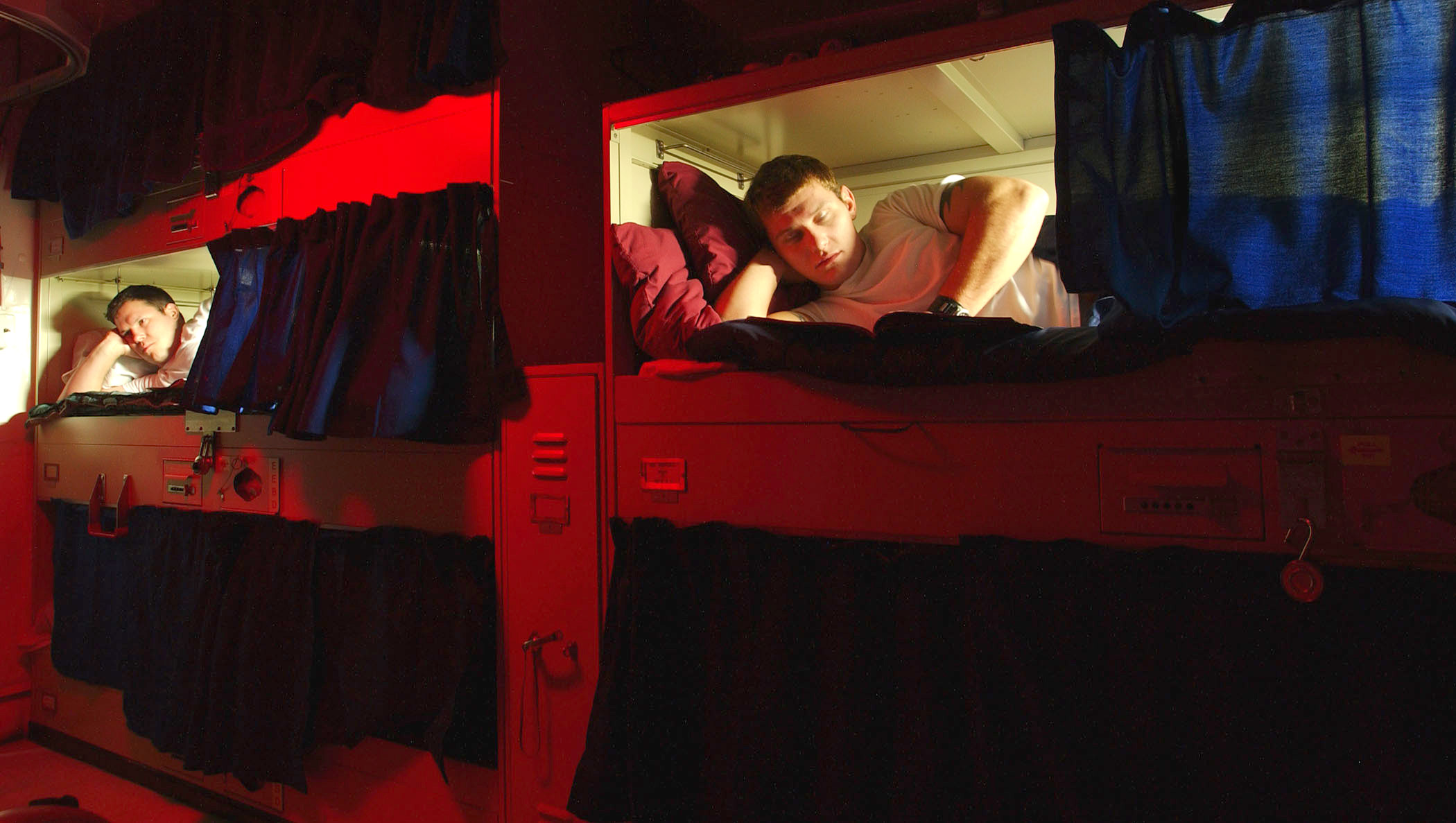
Sailors in their bunks aboard USS John C. Stennis (CVN-74)

=== Pilot berth ===
A narrow berth high up in the side of the cabin, the pilot berth is usually above and behind the back of the settee and right up under the deck. Sometimes the side of this bunk is "walled in" up to the sleeper's chest; there may even be small shelves or lockers on the partition so that the bed is "behind the furniture". The pilot berth is so called because originally they were so small and uncomfortable that nobody slept in them most of the time; only the pilot would be offered it if it were necessary to spend a night aboard the yacht.

=== Quarter berth ===
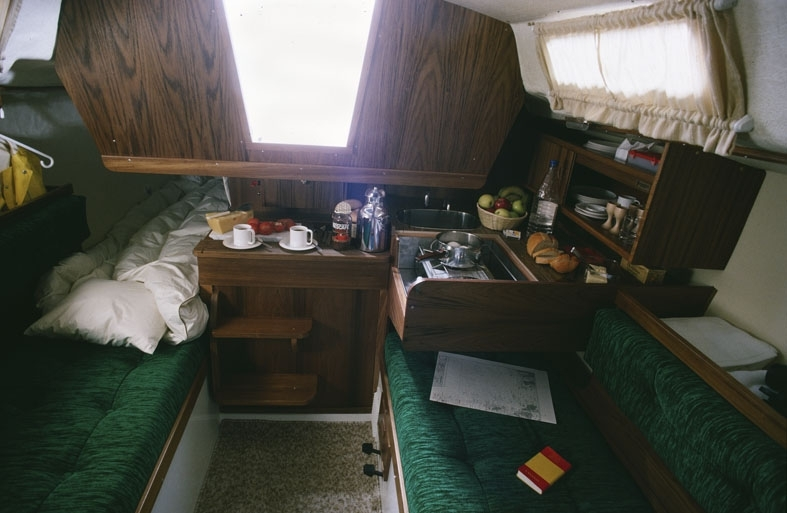
Quarter berth left of the companionway on an Albin Cirrus

This is a single bunk tucked under the cockpit, usually found in smaller boats where there is not room for a cabin in this location.

=== Pipe berth ===
A pipe berth is a canvas cloth laced to a perimeter frame made of pipe. Easily stored due to its flat shape, the pipe berth is often suspended on ropes or fits into brackets when in use. The canvas dries more easily than a mattress.

=== Root berth ===
A root berth is like a pipe berth but with the pipes on only the long sides. Root berths easily roll up for storage. Some use heavy wooden dowels instead of pipes, again fitting into brackets when in use. Some boats provide multiple bracket options so the canvas can be pulled tight like in a pipe berth, or left looser for a more hammock-like berth, helpful in heeling boats or heavy seas.

=== Lee cloths ===
Lee cloths are sheets of canvas or other fabric attached to the open side of the bunk (very few are open all round) and usually tucked under the mattress during the day or when sleeping in harbour. The lee cloth keeps the sleeping person in the bunk from falling out when the boat heels during sailing or rough weather.

== Berths in trains ==
Long-distance trains running at night usually have sleeping compartments with sleeping berths. In the case of compartments with two berths, one is on top of the other in a double-bunk arrangement. These beds (the lower bed in a double-bunk arrangement) are usually designed in conjunction with seats which occupy the same space, and each can be folded away when the other is in use.

Sleeper trains are common, especially in Europe, India and China. Sleeper trains usually consist of single or double-berth compartments, as well as couchette, which have four or six berths (consisting of a bottom, middle and top bunk on each side of the compartment).

=== Open section berths ===
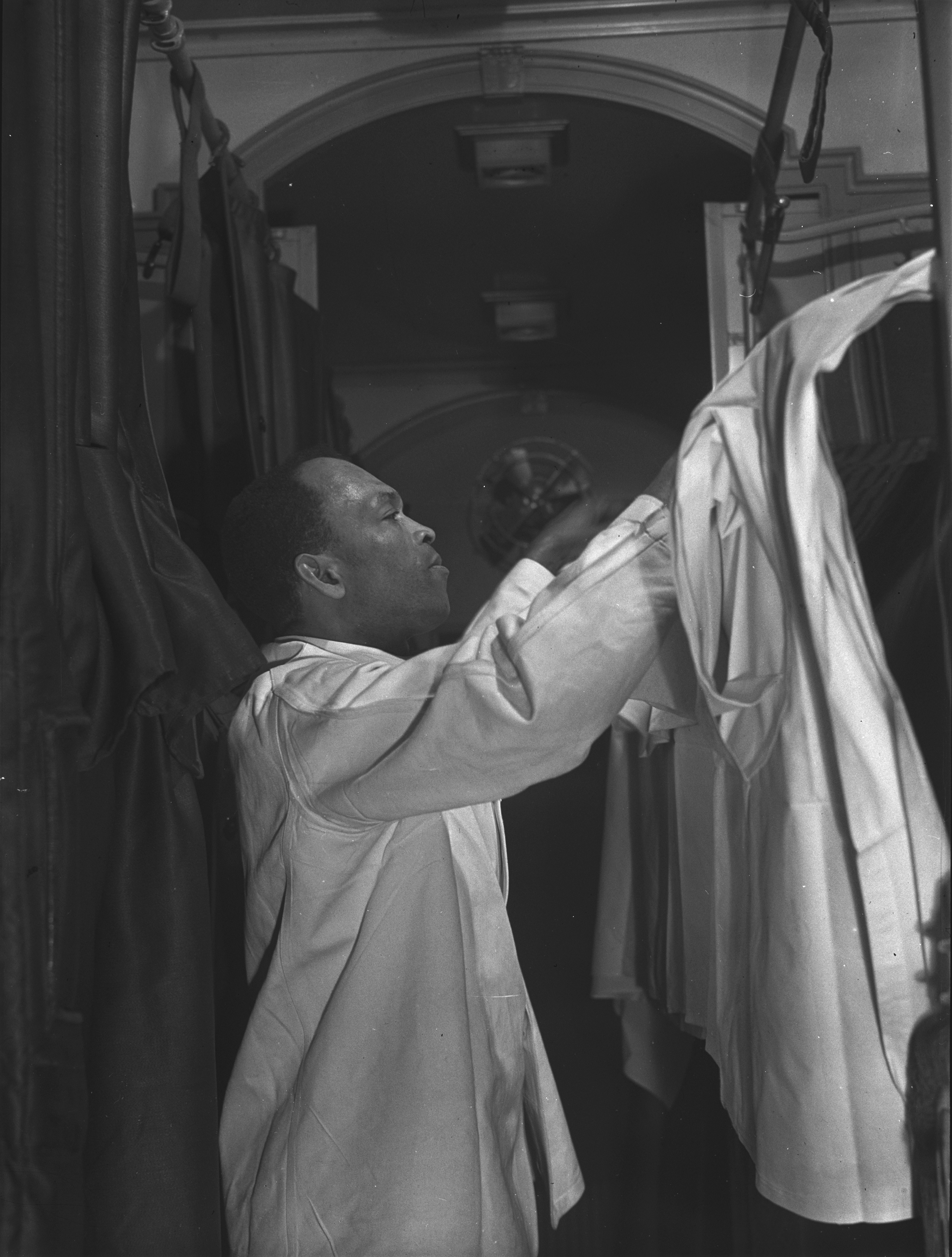
Pullman porter making an upper berth aboard the B&O Capitol Limited bound for Chicago

These berths are clustered in compartments, contrasting with the berths in the open sections of Pullman cars in the United States, common until the 1950s. In these cars, passengers face each other in facing seats during the day. Porters pull down the upper berth and bring the lower seats together to create the lower berth. All of these berths face the aisle running down the center of the sleeping car. Each berth has a curtain for privacy away from the aisle.

== Berths in air transportation ==
In the early 1930s, American Airlines offered on its Curtiss Condor 12 sleeping berths, and by the time of the Boeing 377 Stratocruiser, Air France, and British Overseas Airways Corporation were offering respectively the Parisian Special from Paris-New York on Lockheed Strainers, and Monarch Service on Stratocruisers with lower deck lounges and sleeping berths from London-Montreal.

== Berths in long-distance trucks ==
Long-haul truckers sleep in berths known as sleeper cabs contained within their trucks. The sleeper-berth's size and location is typically regulated.

== See also ==
- Couchette car
- Pullman car
