= Albin 79 =

Sailboat class

Development
- Designer: Rolf Magnusson
- Location: Sweden
- Year: 1974
- No. built: about 250
- Builder: Albin Marine
- Role: Cruiser-Racer
- Name: Albin 79

Boat
- Displacement: 4,200 lb (1,905 kg)
- Draft: 4.58 ft (1.40 m)

Hull
- Type: monohull
- Construction: fibreglass
- LOA: 25.92 ft (7.90 m)
- LWL: 20.00 ft (6.10 m)
- Beam: 8.75 ft (2.67 m)
- Engine: Volvo Penta MD5 10 hp (7 kW) diesel engine

Hull appendages
- Keel: fin keel
- Ballast: 1,653 lb (750 kg)
- Rudder: skeg-mounted rudder

Rig
- Rig type: Bermuda rig
- I foretriangle height: 30.78 ft (9.38 m)
- J foretriangle base: 10.17 ft (3.10 m)
- P mainsail luff: 26.63 ft (8.12 m)
- E mainsail foot: 7.83 ft (2.39 m)

Sails
- Sailplan: masthead sloop
- Mainsail area: 121 sq ft (11.2 m^{2})
- Jib/genoa area: 138 sq ft (12.8 m^{2})
- Spinnaker area: 517 sq ft (48.0 m^{2})
- Gennaker area: 258 sq ft (24.0 m^{2})
- Other sails: Solent: 194 sq ft (18.0 m^{2})
- Upwind sail area: 379 sq ft (35.2 m^{2})
- Downwind sail area: 637 sq ft (59.2 m^{2})

The Albin 79 is a Swedish sailboat that was designed by Rolf Magnusson as an International Offshore Rule Quarter Ton class cruiser-racer and first built in 1974.

The Albin 79 designation indicates its length overall in decimetres.

== Production ==
The design was built by Albin Marine in Sweden from 1974 to 1977, with about 250 boats completed, but it is now out of production.

== Design ==
The Albin 79 is a recreational keelboat, built predominantly of fibreglass, with wood trim. It has a masthead sloop rig with aluminum spars, a deck-stepped mast, wire standing rigging and a single set of unswept spreaders. The hull has a raked stem; a raised counter, reverse transom; a skeg-mounted rudder controlled by a tiller and a fixed fin keel. It displaces 4,200 lb (1,905 kg) and carries 1,653 lb (750 kg) of lead ballast.

The boat has a draft of 4.58 ft (1.40 m) with the standard keel.

The boat is fitted with a Swedish Volvo Penta MD5 diesel engine of 10 hp (7 kW) for docking and manoeuvring.

The design has sleeping accommodation for four to six people, with one cabin and one head.

For sailing the design may be equipped with a symmetrical spinnaker of 517 sq ft (48.0 m^{2}). It has a hull speed of 5.99 kn (11.09 km/h).

== See also ==
- List of sailing boat types
