= Singoalla 34 =

Sailboat class

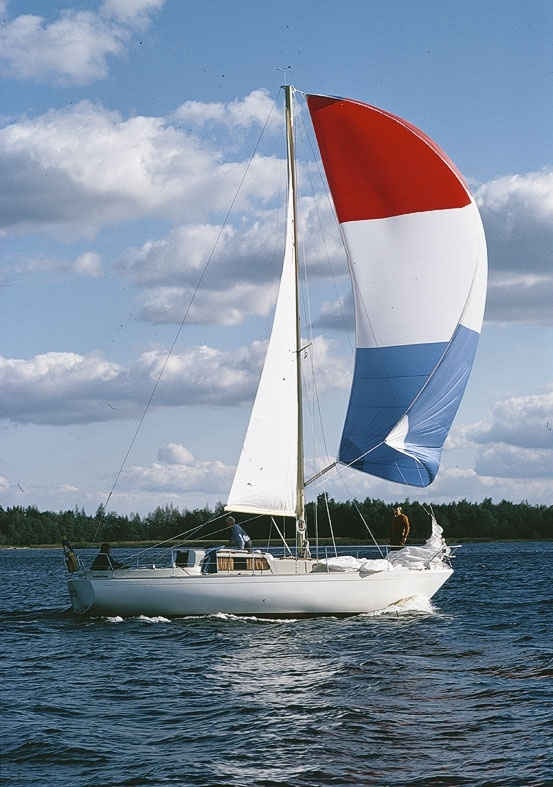

Development
- Designer: Per Brohäll
- Location: Sweden
- Year: 1970
- Builder: Albin Marine
- Role: Cruiser
- Name: Singoalla 34

Boat
- Displacement: 8,820 lb (4,001 kg)
- Draft: 5.17 ft (1.58 m)

Hull
- Type: monohull
- Construction: fibreglass
- LOA: 33.67 ft (10.26 m)
- LWL: 27.33 ft (8.33 m)
- Beam: 10.82 ft (3.30 m)
- Engine: Albin Marine AD-21 22 hp (16 kW) diesel engine

Hull appendages
- Keel: fin keel
- Ballast: 3,750 lb (1,701 kg)
- Rudder: skeg-mounted rudder

Rig
- Rig type: Bermuda rig
- I foretriangle height: 41.34 ft (12.60 m)
- J foretriangle base: 13.65 ft (4.16 m)
- P mainsail luff: 34.43 ft (10.49 m)
- E mainsail foot: 12.79 ft (3.90 m)

Sails
- Sailplan: masthead sloop
- Mainsail area: 251 sq ft (23.3 m^{2})
- Jib/genoa area: 182 sq ft (16.9 m^{2})
- Spinnaker area: 969 sq ft (90.0 m^{2})
- Gennaker area: 423 sq ft (39.3 m^{2})
- Other sails: Solent: 290 sq ft (27 m^{2})
- Upwind sail area: 674 sq ft (62.6 m^{2})
- Downwind sail area: 1,220 sq ft (113 m^{2})

The Singoalla 34, also called the Albin Singoalla, is a Swedish sailboat designed by Per Brohäll as a cruiser and first built in 1970. The boat's designation is from a gypsy woman's name from a medieval legend and film.

The design is an enlarged development of the Brohäll-designed Vega 27. It was not a commercial success and did not remain in production long, with only a few boats sold.

== Production ==
The design was built by Albin Marine in Sweden, starting in 1970, but the design did not sell well and production soon ended.

== Design ==
The Singoalla 34 is a recreational keelboat, built predominantly of fibreglass, with wood trim. It has a masthead sloop rig with aluminum spars, a deck-stepped mast, wire standing rigging and a single set of unswept spreaders. The hull has a raked stem, a slightly angled transom, a skeg-mounted rudder controlled by a wheel and a fixed fin keel. It displaces 8,820 lb (4,001 kg) and carries 3,750 lb (1,701 kg) of ballast.

The boat has a draft of 5.17 ft (1.58 m) with the standard keel.

The boat is fitted with a Swedish Albin Marine AD-21 diesel engine of 22 hp (16 kW) for docking and manoeuvring. The fuel tank holds 19.8 U.S. gallons (75 L; 16.5 imp gal) and the fresh water tank has a capacity of 42.3 U.S. gallons (160 L; 35.2 imp gal).

The design has sleeping accommodation for six people, with a double "V"-berth in the bow cabin, a U-shaped settee and a straight settee with a drop leaf table in the main cabin and an aft cabin with a double berth on the starboard side. The galley is located on the port side just forward of the companionway ladder. The galley is U-shaped and is equipped with a two-burner stove and a sink. A navigation station is opposite the galley, on the starboard side. The enclosed head is located just aft of the bow cabin on the port side.

For sailing the design may be equipped with a symmetrical spinnaker of 969 sq ft (90.0 m^{2}). It has a hull speed of 7.00 kn (12.96 km/h).

== See also ==
- List of sailing boat types

Related development

- Vega 27
