= Albin 57 =

18-foot Swedish keelboat

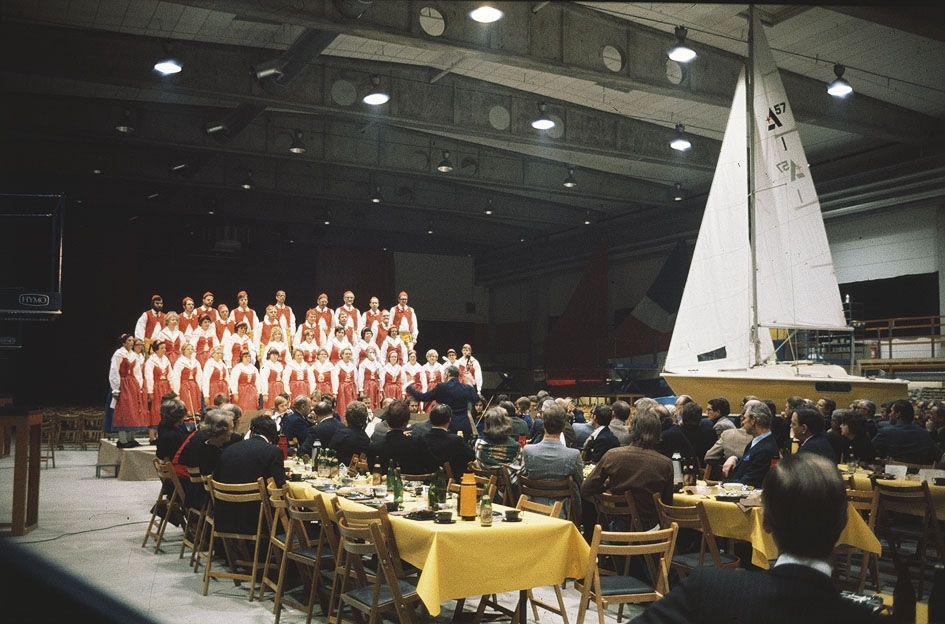
- Presentation of the Albin 57 at Albin Marin, Kristinehamn

Development
- Designer: Rolf Magnusson
- Location: Sweden
- Year: 1977
- No. built: 400
- Builder: Albin Marine
- Role: Cruiser
- Name: Albin 57

Boat
- Displacement: 1,764 lb (800 kg)
- Draft: 4.26 ft (1.30 m) with the keel down

Hull
- Type: monohull
- Construction: fibreglass
- LOA: 18.83 ft (5.74 m)
- LWL: 16.40 ft (5.00 m)
- Beam: 7.91 ft (2.41 m)
- Engine: Outboard motor

Hull appendages
- Keel: swing keel
- Ballast: 562 lb (255 kg)
- Rudder: transom-mounted rudder

Rig
- Rig type: Bermuda rig
- I foretriangle height: 21.82 ft (6.65 m)
- J foretriangle base: 7.38 ft (2.25 m)
- P mainsail luff: 21.98 ft (6.70 m)
- E mainsail foot: 7.87 ft (2.40 m)

Sails
- Sailplan: fractional rigged sloop
- Mainsail area: 97 sq ft (9.0 m^{2})
- Jib/genoa area: 70 sq ft (6.5 m^{2})
- Spinnaker area: 269 sq ft (25.0 m^{2})
- Total sail area: 167 sq ft (15.5 m^{2})

The Albin 57 is a Swedish sailboat that was designed by Rolf Magnusson as a coastal cruiser and first built in 1977.

The boat's designation is its metric length overall in decimetres.

== Production ==
The design was built by Albin Marine in Sweden between 1977 and 1981, with about 400 boats completed, but it is now out of production.

== Design ==
The Albin 57 is a recreational keelboat, built predominantly of fibreglass, with wood trim. It has a fractional sloop rig with aluminum spars, wire standing rigging and a single set of swept spreaders. The hull has a raked stem, a plumb transom, a transom-hung rudder controlled by a tiller and a swing keel. It displaces 1,764 lb (800 kg) and carries 562 lb (255 kg) of ballast.

The boat has a draft of 4.26 ft (1.30 m) with the swing keel extended and 1.97 ft (0.60 m) with it retracted, allowing ground transportation on a trailer.

The boat is normally fitted with a small outboard motor for docking and manoeuvring.

The design has sleeping accommodation for four people, with a double "V"-berth in the bow cabin and two straight settees in the main cabin. The galley is located at the companionway ladder. The galley is equipped with a two-burner stove. There are hull-mounted rectangular ports on both sides of the boat.

For sailing the design may be equipped with a symmetrical spinnaker of 269 sq ft (25.0 m^{2}). It has a hull speed of 5.43 kn (10.06 km/h).
