= Matthew Rutherford =

Matthew Rutherford may refer to:

- Matt Rutherford (Glee), character in Glee
- Matthew Rutherford, High Sheriff of Londonderry City
- Matthew S. Rutherford of Office of Financial Markets (U.S.)
- Matthew Rutherford (actor) in The Silent Fall
- Matt Rutherford (sailor), long distance sailer and circumnavigator
