= Stratus 36 =

Sailboat class

Development
- Designer: Peter Norlin
- Location: Sweden
- Year: 1980
- No. built: 130
- Builder: Albin Marine
- Role: Racer-Cruiser

Boat
- Displacement: 11,466 lb (5,201 kg)
- Draft: 5.90 ft (1.80 m)

Hull
- Type: monohull
- Construction: fibreglass
- LOA: 35.17 ft (10.72 m)
- LWL: 27.24 ft (8.30 m)
- Beam: 10.83 ft (3.30 m)
- Engine: Volvo Penta MD11 23 hp (17 kW) diesel engine

Hull appendages
- Keel: fin keel
- Ballast: 4,960 lb (2,250 kg)
- Rudder: internally-mounted spade-type rudder

Rig
- Rig type: Bermuda rig
- I foretriangle height: 41.33 ft (12.60 m)
- J foretriangle base: 12.78 ft (3.90 m)
- P mainsail luff: 42.63 ft (12.99 m)
- E mainsail foot: 14.10 ft (4.30 m)

Sails
- Sailplan: fractional rigged sloop
- Mainsail area: 301 sq ft (28.0 m^{2})
- Jib/genoa area: 205 sq ft (19.0 m^{2})
- Spinnaker area: 969 sq ft (90.0 m^{2})
- Gennaker area: 398 sq ft (37.0 m^{2})
- Upwind sail area: 700 sq ft (65 m^{2})
- Downwind sail area: 1,270 sq ft (118 m^{2})

The Stratus 36, also called the 107 Stratus for its metric length in decimetres, is a Swedish sailboat that was designed by Peter Norlin as an International Offshore Rule Three-Quarter Ton class racer-cruiser and first built in 1980.

The design is a development of Regnbagen, a one-off boat that won the Three-Quarter Ton class Cup in Hundested, Denmark in 1979.

== Production ==
The design was built by Albin Marine in Sweden between 1980 and 1984, with 130 examples completed. After Albin production ended a few boats were built in South Korea between 1984 and 1986, but it is now out of production.

== Design ==
The Stratus 36 is a racing keelboat, built predominantly of fibreglass, with wood trim. The early boats built had teak decks. It has a 7/8 fractional sloop rig with a deck-stepped mast, aluminum spars, wire standing rigging and a single set of unswept spreaders. The hull has a raked stem, a reverse transom, an internally mounted spade-type rudder controlled by a wheel and a fixed fin keel. It displaces 11,466 lb (5,201 kg) and carries 4,960 lb (2,250 kg) of lead ballast.

The boat has a draft of 5.90 ft (1.80 m) with the standard keel.

The boat is fitted with a Swedish Volvo Penta MD-11 diesel engine of 23 hp (17 kW) for docking and manoeuvring. The fuel tank holds 60.8 U.S. gallons (230 L; 50.6 imp gal) and the fresh water tank has a capacity of 118.9 U.S. gallons (450 L; 99.0 imp gal).

The design has sleeping accommodation for five to seven people, with a double "V"-berth in the bow cabin, two straight settees in the main cabin and an aft cabin with a double berth on the starboard side and a single berth on the port side. The galley is located on the port side just forward of the companionway ladder. The galley is equipped with a three-burner stove, with an oven and a double sink. A navigation station is opposite the galley, on the starboard side. The head is located opposite the galley on the starboard side.

For sailing the design may be equipped with a symmetrical spinnaker of 969 sq ft (90.0 m^{2}). It has a hull speed of 6.99 kn (12.95 km/h).

== See also ==
- List of sailing boat types
