= Albin 82 MS =

Sailboat class

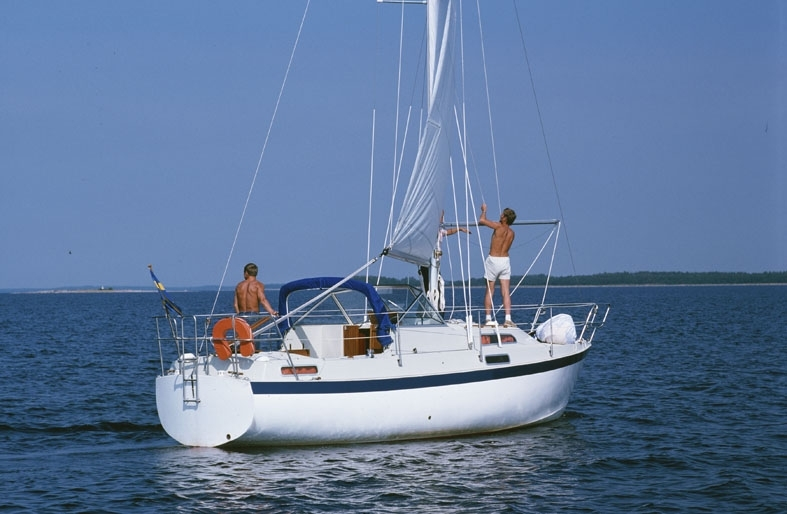

Development
- Designer: Per Brohäll
- Location: Sweden
- Year: 1975
- Builder: Albin Marine
- Role: Motorsailer
- Name: Albin 82 MS

Boat
- Displacement: 7,496 lb (3,400 kg)
- Draft: 3.92 ft (1.19 m)

Hull
- Type: monohull
- Construction: fibreglass
- LOA: 29.92 ft (9.12 m)
- LWL: 25.0 ft (7.6 m)
- Beam: 9.33 ft (2.84 m)
- Engine: Volvo Penta MD17C 35 hp (26 kW) diesel engine

Hull appendages
- Keel: fin keel
- Ballast: 1,984 lb (900 kg)
- Rudder: skeg-mounted rudder

Rig
- Rig type: Bermuda rig

Sails
- Sailplan: fractional rigged sloop
- Mainsail area: 183 sq ft (17.0 m^{2})
- Jib/genoa area: 140 sq ft (13 m^{2})
- Spinnaker area: 614 sq ft (57.0 m^{2})
- Gennaker area: 271 sq ft (25.2 m^{2})
- Upwind sail area: 454 sq ft (42.2 m^{2})
- Downwind sail area: 797 sq ft (74.0 m^{2})

The Albin 82 MS is a Swedish sailboat design that was designed by Per Brohäll as motorsailer and first built in 1975.

== Production ==
The design was built by Albin Marine in Sweden, starting in 1975, but it is now out of production.

== Design ==
The Albin 82 MS is a recreational keelboat, built predominantly of fibreglass, with wood trim. It has a fractional sloop rig with aluminum spars, a deck-stepped mast, wire standing rigging and a single set of unswept spreaders. The hull has a raked stem, a plumb transom, with a swim ladder, a centre cockpit, skeg-mounted rudder controlled by a wheel, an auxiliary tiller and a fixed fin keel. It displaces 7,496 lb (3,400 kg) and carries 1,984 lb (900 kg) of ballast. A self-draining anchor locker is provided at the bow.

The boat has a draft of 3.92 ft (1.19 m) with the standard keel.

The boat is fitted with a Volvo Penta MD17C diesel engine of 35 hp (26 kW) for docking and manoeuvring. The fuel tank holds 33 U.S. gallons (120 L; 27 imp gal) and the fresh water tank has a capacity of 17.2 U.S. gallons (65 L; 14.3 imp gal).

The design has sleeping accommodation for six people, with a double "V"-berth in the bow cabin, a double straight settee and drop-down table in the main cabin and two quarter berths aft. The galley is located on the port side forward of the companionway ladder. The galley is equipped with a two-burner stove and a sink with foot-pumped fresh and sea water. The enclosed head is located just aft of the galley on the port side. The design also has a dining table in the cockpit.

For sailing the design may be equipped with a symmetrical spinnaker of 614 sq ft (57.0 m^{2}). It has a hull speed of 6.70 kn (12.41 km/h).

== Operational history ==
A May 1977 review in Boating magazine stated, "the Albin 82 MS is aimed at one such niche that few U.S. boatbuilders have catered to in the past - small motorsailers. After spending an afternoon aboard an Albin 82 in Ft. Lauderdale this winter, we'd say she's right on target. High freeboard, a chopped-off stern, and a pronounced trunk cabin give the Albin a rather stubby look, but we find her appearance inoffensive and suited to her purpose—she's not meant to be a gazelle, after all. Her fixed windshield might also look out of place aboard a sailboat at first glance, but again it goes along with her motorsailer role of leisurely cruising in comfort."

A January 1977 review by Betsy Hitz in Cruising World magazine, noted that the boat is "a motorsailer in the truest sense of the word, the 82 MS was designed to perform equally well under power or sail, or a combination of both. Maximum safety and ease of handling characterize her rig and deck layout. The cockpit is deep and well protected with a dodger as standard equipment. Two steering positions are provided: a tiller aft, and a wheel-steering station at the forward end of the cockpit, with instruments and helmsman's seat.

== See also ==
- List of sailing boat types
