= Nova 33 =

Sailboat class

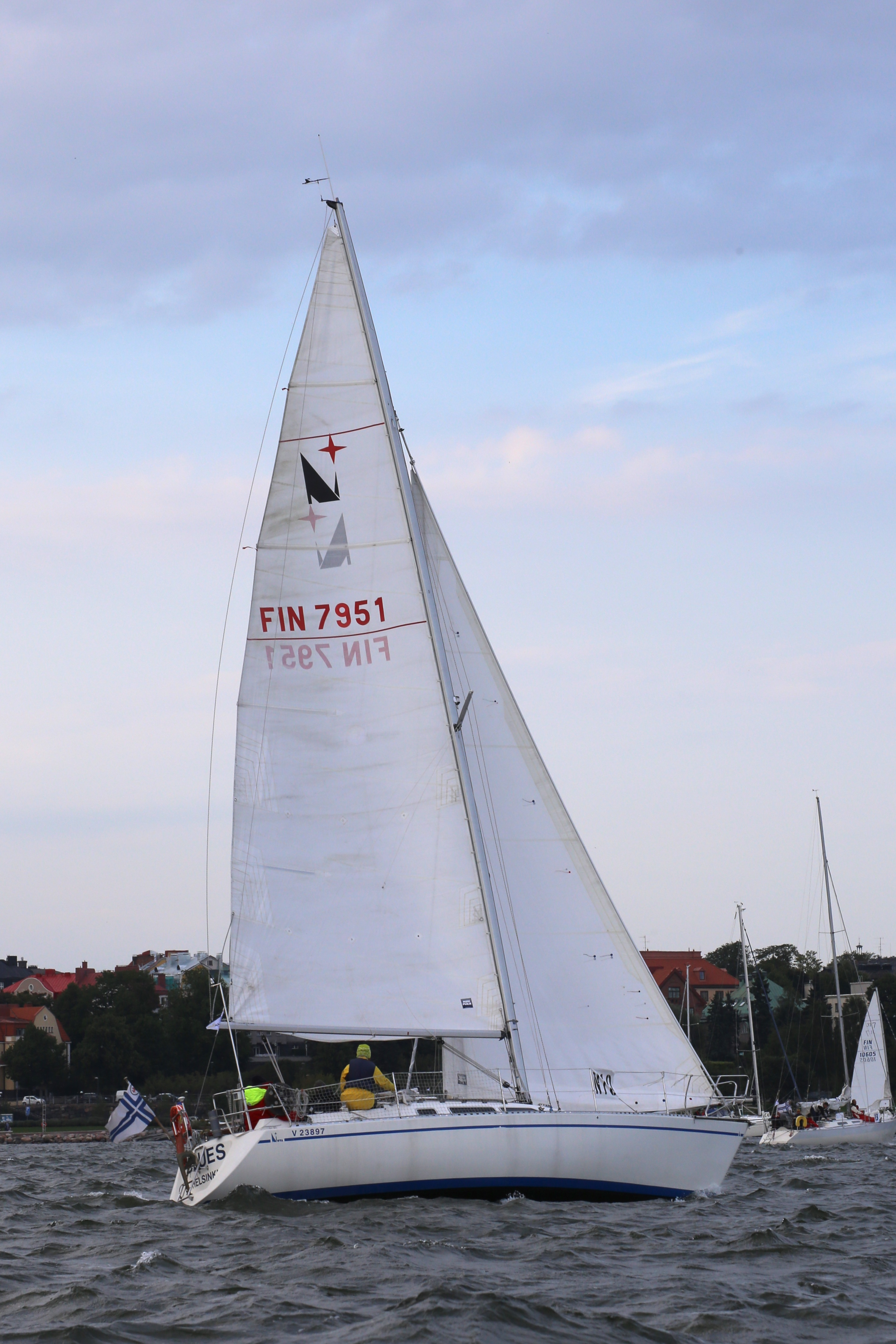

Development
- Designer: Peter Norlin
- Location: Sweden
- Year: 1981
- No. built: about 500
- Builders: Albin Marine; Express Production AB
- Role: Cruiser
- Name: Nova 33

Boat
- Displacement: 8,177 lb (3,709 kg)
- Draft: 5.50 ft (1.68 m)

Hull
- Type: monohull
- Construction: fibreglass
- LOA: 33.00 ft (10.06 m)
- LWL: 26.25 ft (8.00 m)
- Beam: 10.33 ft (3.15 m)
- Engine: Yanmar 2GM 15 hp (11 kW) diesel engine

Hull appendages
- Keel: fin keel
- Ballast: 3,868 lb (1,754 kg)
- Rudder: internally-mounted spade-type rudder

Rig
- Rig type: Bermuda rig
- I foretriangle height: 35.10 ft (10.70 m)
- J foretriangle base: 12.14 ft (3.70 m)
- P mainsail luff: 39.70 ft (12.10 m)
- E mainsail foot: 14.10 ft (4.30 m)

Sails
- Sailplan: fractional rigged sloop
- Mainsail area: 279.89 sq ft (26.003 m^{2})
- Jib/genoa area: 213.06 sq ft (19.794 m^{2})
- Upwind sail area: 492.94 sq ft (45.796 m^{2})

The Nova 33 is a Swedish sailboat that was designed by Peter Norlin as a cruiser and first built in 1981.

The boat is often referred to as the Albin Nova, Albin 10 Metre, Albin 99 Nova and the Albin Nova 33. It was marketed by the manufacturer as the Albin Nova 33.

== Production ==
The design was built by Albin Marine in Sweden between 1981 and 1997. Some later boats were produced by Express Production AB, also of Sweden. In total about 500 boats were completed, but it is now out of production.

== Design ==
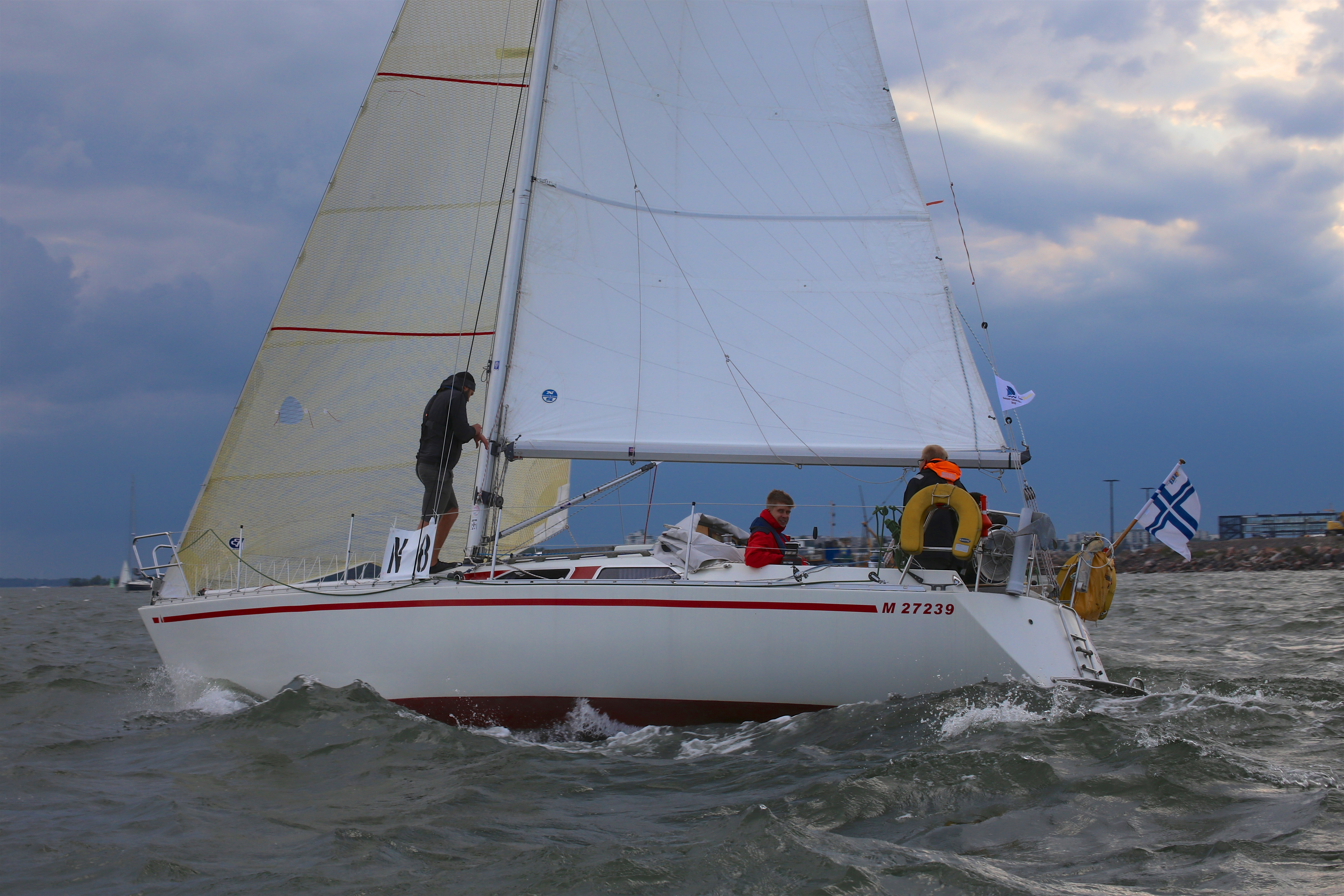
Nova 33 showing the design's reverse transom

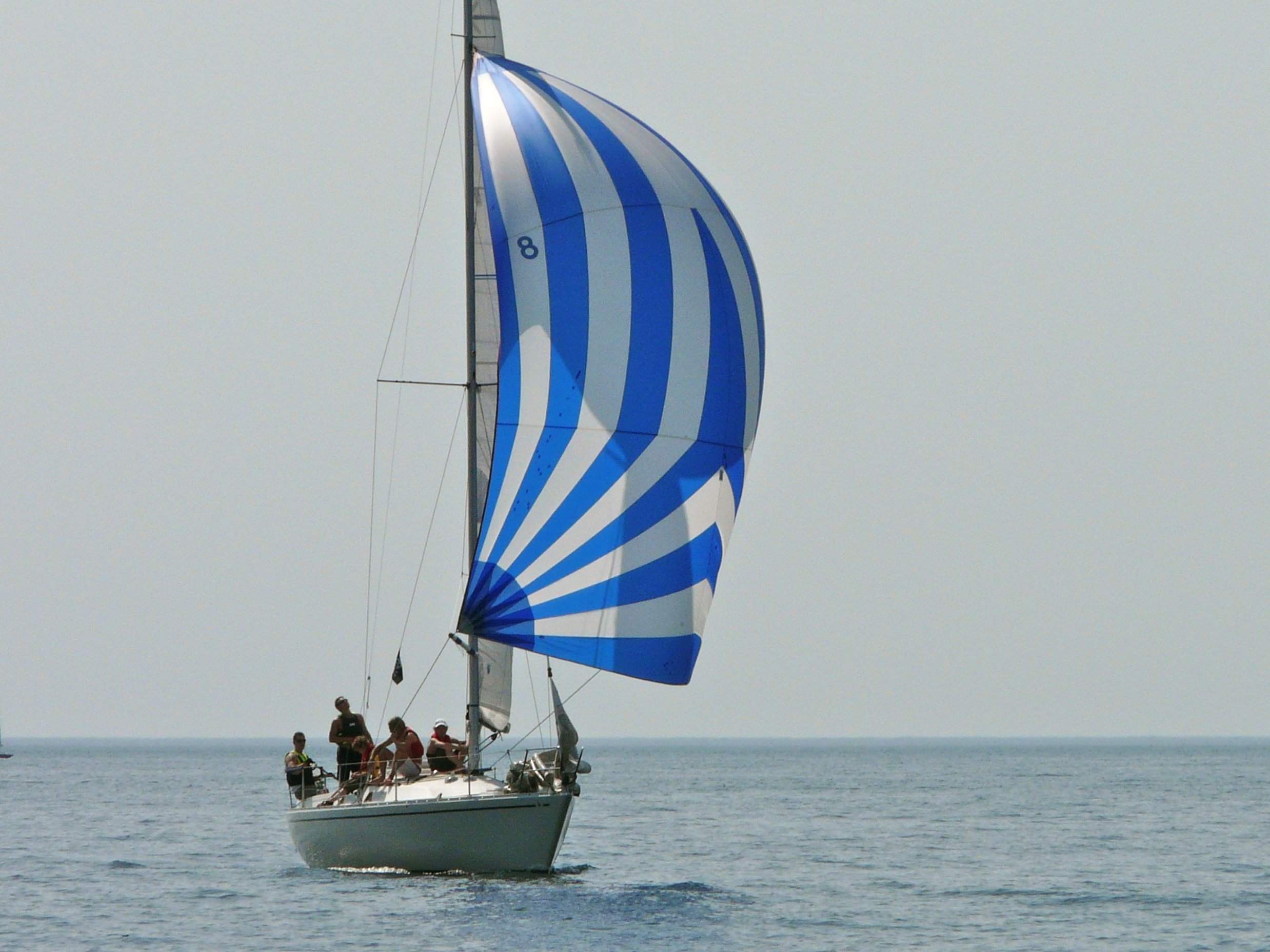
A Nova 33 flying a spinnaker.

The Nova 33 is a recreational keelboat, built predominantly of fibreglass, with wood trim. It has a 7/8 fractional sloop rig with aluminum spars, a keel-stepped mast, wire standing rigging and a single set of swept spreaders. The hull has a raked stem, a reverse transom, an internally mounted spade-type rudder controlled by a tiller and a fixed fin keel. It displaces 8,177 lb (3,709 kg) and carries 3,868 lb (1,754 kg) of cast iron ballast.

The boat has a draft of 5.50 ft (1.68 m) with the standard keel.

The boat is fitted with a Japanese Yanmar 2GM diesel engine of 15 hp (11 kW) for docking and manoeuvring. The fuel tank holds 11.9 U.S. gallons (45 L; 9.9 imp gal) and the fresh water tank has a capacity of 23.8 U.S. gallons (90 L; 19.8 imp gal).

The design has sleeping accommodation for six people, with a double "V"-berth in the bow cabin, an L-shaped settee and a straight settee in the main cabin and an aft cabin with a double berth on the starboard side. The main cabin also has a drop-leaf table. The galley is located on the port side just forward of the companionway ladder. The galley is L-shaped and is equipped with a two-burner stove and a double sink. A navigation station is opposite the galley, on the starboard side. The head is located just aft of the bow cabin on the starboard side.

For sailing the design may be equipped with a symmetrical spinnaker. It has a hull speed of 6.87 kn (12.72 km/h).

== Operational history ==
The boat is supported by an active class club based in Sweden, that organizes racing events, the Novaförbundet (English: Nova Association).

== See also ==
- List of sailing boat types
