= Viggen 23 =

Swedish recreational keelboat

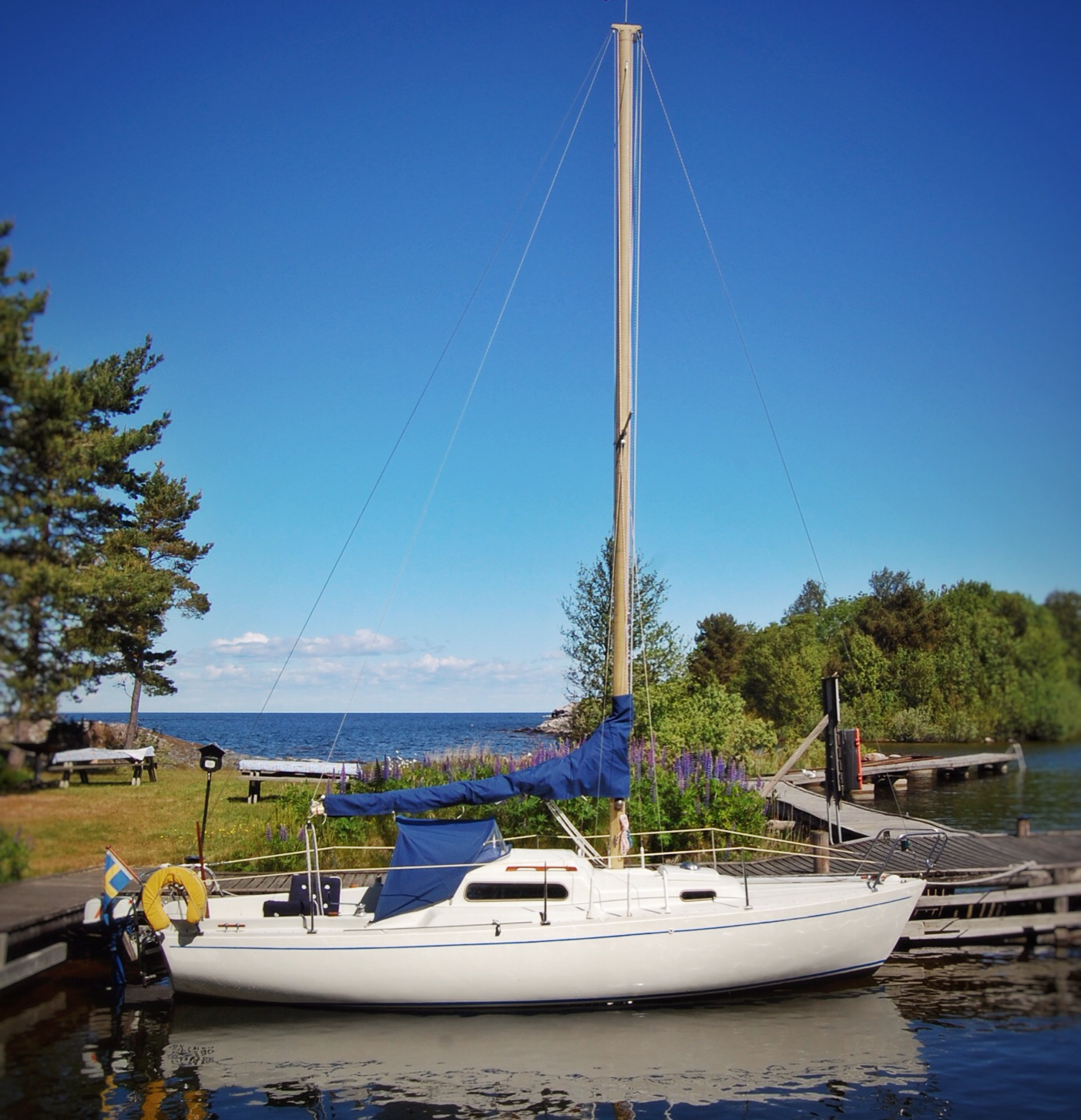

Development
- Designer: Per Brohäll
- Location: Sweden
- Year: 1966
- No. built: about 1,450
- Builders: Shipyard Karlskrona; Albin Marine
- Role: Cruiser
- Name: Viggen 23

Boat
- Displacement: 3,086 lb (1,400 kg)
- Draft: 3.64 ft (1.11 m)

Hull
- Type: monohull
- Construction: fibreglass
- LOA: 23.29 ft (7.10 m)
- LWL: 6.1 m (20 ft)
- Beam: 7.35 ft (2.24 m)

Hull appendages
- Keel: fin keel
- Ballast: 1,323 lb (600 kg)
- Rudder: skeg-mounted rudder

Rig
- Rig type: Bermuda rig
- I foretriangle height: 27.33 ft (8.33 m)
- J foretriangle base: 6.56 ft (2.00 m)
- P mainsail luff: 22.51 ft (6.86 m)
- E mainsail foot: 8.86 ft (2.70 m)

Sails
- Sailplan: masthead sloop
- Mainsail area: 110 sq ft (10 m^{2})
- Jib/genoa area: 108 sq ft (10.0 m^{2})
- Spinnaker area: 463 sq ft (43.0 m^{2})
- Gennaker area: 210 sq ft (20 m^{2})
- Upwind sail area: 320 sq ft (30 m^{2})
- Downwind sail area: 573 sq ft (53.2 m^{2})

The Viggen 23, also called the Albin Viggen, is a recreational keelboat that was designed by Per Brohäll. It was built by Shipyard Karlskrona in Sweden from 1966 to 1971. It then had its rudder and keel modified and was built by Albin Marine from 1971 until 1977. A total of about 1,450 boats were built, but it is now out of production.

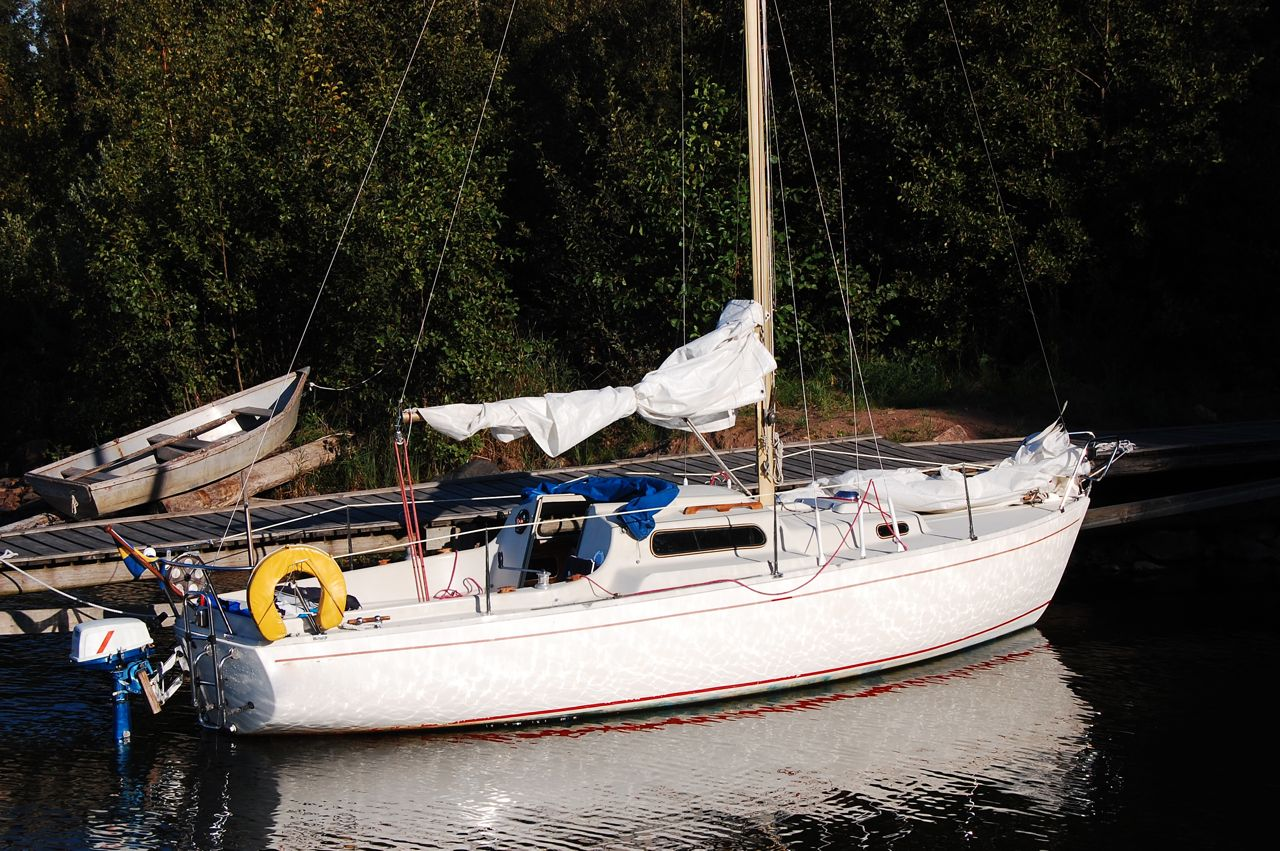
Viggen 23 sailboat showing transom

The Viggen 23 is a recreational keelboat, built predominantly of fibreglass, with wood trim. It has a masthead sloop rig with aluminum spars, a deck-stepped mast, wire standing rigging and a single set of unswept spreaders. The hull has a spooned raked stem, an angled transom, a skeg-mounted rudder controlled by a tiller and a fixed fin keel. It displaces 3,086 lb (1,400 kg) and carries 1,323 lb (600 kg) of ballast.

The boat has a draft of 3.64 ft (1.11 m) with the standard keel.

The design has sleeping accommodation for four people, with a double "V"-berth in the bow cabin and two straight settees in the main cabin. The galley is located on the port side at the companionway ladder. The galley is equipped with a two-burner stove. A navigation station is opposite the galley, hidden under the starboard side seat. The head is located under the v-berth fill-in. The fresh water tank has a capacity of 11.9 U.S. gallons (45 L; 9.9 imp gal).

For sailing the design may be equipped with a symmetrical spinnaker of 463 sq ft (43.0 m^{2}). It has a hull speed of 5.95 kn (11.02 km/h).
