= Alpha 29 =

Sailboat class

Development
- Designer: Peter Norlin
- Location: Sweden
- Year: 1984
- No. built: 200
- Builder: Albin Marine

Boat
- Displacement: 7,275 lb (3,300 kg)
- Draft: 5.41 ft (1.65 m)

Hull
- Type: monohull
- Construction: fibreglass
- LOA: 29.36 ft (8.95 m)
- LWL: 23.62 ft (7.20 m)
- Beam: 9.32 ft (2.84 m)
- Engine: Yanmar 9 hp (7 kW) diesel engine

Hull appendages
- Keel: fin keel
- Ballast: 3,042 lb (1,380 kg)
- Rudder: internally-mounted spade-type rudder

Rig
- Rig type: Bermuda rig
- I foretriangle height: 34.91 ft (10.64 m)
- J foretriangle base: 10.83 ft (3.30 m)
- P mainsail luff: 37.07 ft (11.30 m)
- E mainsail foot: 11.81 ft (3.60 m)

Sails
- Sailplan: fractional rigged sloop
- Mainsail area: 218.90 sq ft (20.336 m^{2})
- Jib/genoa area: 189.04 sq ft (17.562 m^{2})
- Total sail area: 407.94 sq ft (37.899 m^{2})

The Alpha 29, also called the Albin Alpha, is a Swedish sailboat that was designed by Peter Norlin and first built in 1984.

== Production ==
The design was built by Albin Marine in Sweden between 1984 and 1991, with 200 boats completed, but it is now out of production.

== Design ==
The Alpha 29 is a recreational keelboat, built predominantly of fibreglass, with wood trim. It has a fractional sloop rig, a raked stem, a reverse transom, an internally mounted spade-type rudder and a fixed fin keel. It displaces 7,275 lb (3,300 kg) and carries 3,042 lb (1,380 kg) of ballast.

The boat has a draft of 5.41 ft (1.65 m) with the standard keel.

The boat is fitted with a Japanese Yanmar diesel engine of 9 hp (7 kW) for docking and manoeuvring. The fuel tank holds 12 U.S. gallons (45 L; 10.0 imp gal) and the fresh water tank has a capacity of 29 U.S. gallons (110 L; 24 imp gal).

The design has a hull speed of 6.51 kn (12.06 km/h).

== See also ==
- List of sailing boat types
