= Jarle Andhøy =

Norwegian adventurer and sailing skipper

Jarle Andhøy (born October 23, 1977) is a Norwegian adventurer and sailing skipper.

He has undertaken a number of controversial voyages, primarily to the polar regions. He is most renowned for his voyages together with Alex Rosén (Norwegian comedian/presenter/musician) in the 27-foot Albin Vega sailing vessel Berserk to Svalbard and Russia, since these voyages became the subject of the Norwegian television series Berserk mot Nordpolen ("Berserk to the North Pole") and Berserk til Valhall ("Berserk to Valhalla") which aired on NRK in 2003 and 2005 and was published as a book in 2006.

In February 2011, during Andhøy's Antarctic expedition, Berserk sank in Antarctica with the loss of three crew.

== Notable voyages ==
Andhøy's first major voyage, in 1996–1997, was as a 19-year-old in Berserk; his first 27-foot Albin Vega. He sailed primarily single-handed from his home town of Larvik to the Antarctic Peninsula, although during some legs of the voyage he was accompanied by crews that he picked up along the way. Andhøy wrote a book about his voyage entitled Alene Rundt Kapp Horn ("Alone Around Cape Horn"). Andhøy met David Meisselman (USA) and Juan Manuel Hernandez (Argentina) in Ushuaia, on January first 1999 and together they sailed across the Drake Passage after a very rough crossing (force 12 storm off Cape Horn), the 3 made it to the Antarctic peninsula. Their voyage is depicted in the film "Berserk in Antarctica" (Kaare Skard), that won the people's choice award at the Telluride film festival in 2001, making Andhøy a household name in Norway. Meisselman later changed his family name to "Mercy", wrote a book about the voyage, and crewed on some of Andhøy's later voyages. He did not return to Antarctica. Juan Manuel Hernandez went on to partake in a total of 3 of the 4 Berserk Antarctic expeditions: in 2012 along with Samuel Massie (Norway), Busby Noble (New Zealand) and Sergey Smirnoff (Russia) from Auckland, New Zealand to the southernmost point in the Antarctic sea as depicted in the TV series called "searching for Berserk"; and, in 2015 along with Anne-Kat Haerland (Norway), Peter Baarli (Norway), Rune "Supern" Skalgard (Norway) and Jan Frederick Beckebold (Norway) as depicted in the TV series called In the wake of Shackleton.

In June 2002, Andhøy, Rosén, and Mercy, sailed to the Arctic in another Albin Vega, called Berserk II; their goal was to sail in the path of Ohthere, the Viking chief, and to sail as far as possible north towards the Arctic ice. According to their own account of the voyage, the expedition set a world record, as no other sailing vessel had ever sailed as far north in open water. Immediately after returning to Longyearbyen on Svalbard, Sysselmannen (the governor of Svalbard) charged Andhøy, as the skipper, with sailing without insurance and for failing to submit a route-plan. He was required to pay a fine of 20,000 Norwegian Kroner and was refused permission to continue in Svalbard's waters. Andhøy failed to pay the fine, and so the case was taken to Nord-Troms court on 30 April 2003. Additionally, Andhøy, Rosén, and Mercy released a television series which documented their voyage (first aired on NRK in the autumn of 2003). Using that documentary as evidence, the Sysselmannen charged the trio with a number of environmental crimes, including unauthorised landings in protected areas and provoking a polar bear. The case, carrying a sentence of 30 days imprisonment and a fine of 25,000 Kroner, was heard in Larvik court on 29 March 2004. They were found guilty, but the sentence was reduced to 5,000 Kroner and the imprisonment was suspended, pending a 2-year probationary period.

In July 2004, Andhøy and Rosén attempted to continue the voyage. However, the Norwegian Police and Coastguard attempted to stop them since they believed Mercy, who was still wanted in connection with the previous environmental charges, was also aboard. When Berserk II was searched near Vardø, Mercy was not found aboard, although it transpired that he was hiding in Vardø, disguised as a taxi driver. In order to avoid further attention from the Norwegian authorities, the expedition continued towards Russia. They sailed on to Arkhangelsk, and further through the White Sea–Baltic Canal to the Baltic Sea.

In the summer of 2007, Andhøy undertook a new expedition to explore the Northwest Passage, sailing from the Atlantic to the Pacific Ocean along the Canadian coast. This voyage was undertaken in a 48-foot steel boat, also renamed Berserk, and with a larger crew, amongst them Mercy and Fredrik Juell. However, in early July, two of the crew, including Juell, were arrested by the Canadian authorities. In August, Andhøy was also arrested by the Canadian authorities for attempting to smuggle Juell back into Canada, after he had been denied permission following the previous arrest. Andhøy published his account of the voyage in another book Berserk gjennom Nordvestpassasjen ("Berserk through the Northwest Passage") and a NRK television series of the same name.

== Berserk's attempts to transit the Northwest Passage ==
In 2007 Andhoy tried to transit Canada's Northwest Passage to prepare another broadcast. When Canadian border officials told him the Berserk II could not enter Canada because two of her five crew were inadmissible to Canada due to prior criminal convictions, he tried, and failed, to circumvent Canada's border control.

The voyage was discussed in the Canadian Senate.

== Berserk sinking ==
In February 2011 during an expedition to the South Pole, Berserk activated its emergency transponder with three people on board. At the time Jarle Andhøy and one of his crewmates, Samuel Massie, were driving ATVs towards the pole.

An extensive search was coordinated by New Zealand's Rescue Co-ordination Centre, and involved the governments of New Zealand, Norway, and the United States. Involved in the search were the New Zealand naval vessel Wellington, and the private vessels Professor Khromov (Spirit of Enderby) and Sea Shepherd ship MY Steve Irwin, in addition to the helicopter on the Steve Irwin. On 25 February, the Steve Irwin found an empty, damaged lifeboat from the Berserk and several packages of drinking water, but no sign of the boat itself. After an extensive search by these vessels, the search was concluded on 1 March 2011 with all three crew member presumed dead.

Jarle Andhøy was travelling without any permits and insurance, for which he was charged by the Norwegian Polar Institute and fined NOK 25,000.

== Nilaya search ==
In January 2012, the New Zealand Customs Service mounted a search for the SV Nilaya, after the Norwegian Ministry of Foreign Affairs notified the Antarctic Treaty parties that it suspected that Andhøy and Massie would be on that yacht to again try to sail to Antarctica illegally. Andhøy had told the Norwegian Ministry of his plans but had not obtained the required permits from Norway. According to the authorities, Andhøy had also entered New Zealand illegally on his way southwards because he had not declared his previous deportation from Canada. It was also illegal to leave New Zealand waters as he did without customs clearance. Also on board were Samuel Massie, a Russian, an Argentine and an unknown New Zealand "stowaway". It left Auckland New Zealand on 23 January 2012; New Zealand Customs attempted a search.

The New Zealander turned out to be Busby Noble, an undocumented Maori man in his fifties who claimed to be on board by accident, and who later performed a "karakia" or prayer for the men lost on the 2011 Berserk voyage. The Nilaya successfully reached the area where Berserk was lost, but after a fruitless search, Andhøy set course for Argentina to avoid consequences in New Zealand.

After sustaining minor damage the vessel headed to Chile to seek help with repairs, and fuel. In Puerto Williams, Isla Navarino, Chile, the Nilaya was then detained by the Chilean Navy because she gave a false name when contacted by radio. Chilean authorities were also aware that a "stowaway" New Zealand citizen lacked a passport, and it was unclear if he was there of his own free will. The crew presented the vessel as being both Russian and Norwegian flagged, and she was flying a pirate flag when she was detained. Andhøy returned to Norway in May 2012.

Andhøy was initially fined NOK 25,000 ($4,500), but in July 2014 it was reported that he'd been fined NOK 45,000 ($7,250) by Norway for violating environmental and reporting provisions of the Antarctic Treaty during his 2012 exploits. He stated that he wouldn't pay—that could subject him to a 50-day suspended jail sentence.

== Trials ==
In 2014 a trial against him started in the Norwegian court system for sailing to Antarctica without permission or insurance. After a series of trials and appeals, he was fined and sentenced to 30 days of imprisonment.
