= Accent 26 =

Sailboat class

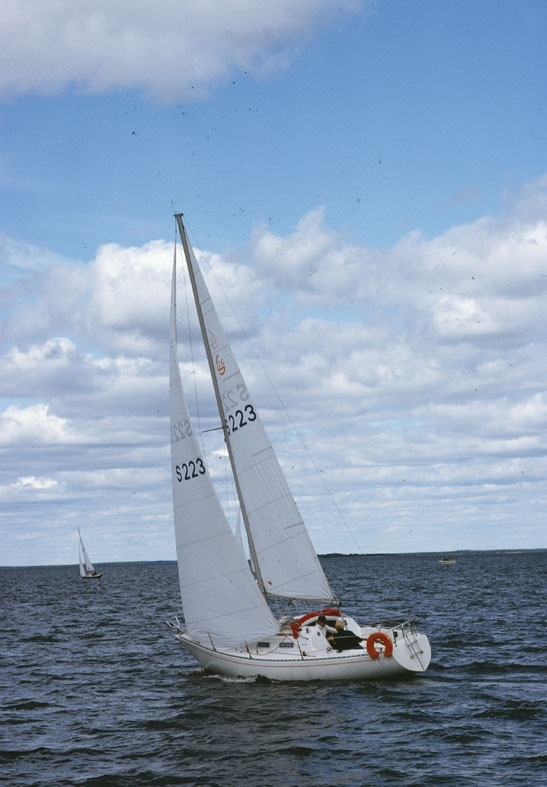

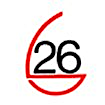

Development
- Designer: Peter Norlin
- Location: Sweden
- Year: 1975
- No. built: 760
- Builders: Albin Marine; Shipman Sweden AB
- Role: Cruiser-Racer
- Name: Accent 26

Boat
- Displacement: 5,512 lb (2,500 kg)
- Draft: 5.05 ft (1.54 m)

Hull
- Type: monohull
- Construction: fibreglass
- LOA: 26.41 ft (8.05 m)
- LWL: 20.51 ft (6.25 m)
- Beam: 9.09 ft (2.77 m)
- Engine: Yanmar 8 hp (6 kW) diesel engine

Hull appendages
- Keel: fin keel
- Ballast: 1,962 lb (890 kg)
- Rudder: skeg-mounted rudder

Rig
- Rig type: Bermuda rig
- I foretriangle height: 32.81 ft (10.00 m)
- J foretriangle base: 9.84 ft (3.00 m)
- P mainsail luff: 28.87 ft (8.80 m)
- E mainsail foot: 8.20 ft (2.50 m)

Sails
- Sailplan: masthead sloop
- Mainsail area: 129 sq ft (12.0 m^{2})
- Jib/genoa area: 161.43 sq ft (14.997 m^{2})
- Gennaker area: 179 sq ft (16.6 m^{2})

The Accent 26, also called the Albin Accent and the Shipman Accent, is a Swedish sailboat that was designed by Peter Norlin as an International Offshore Rule Quarter Ton class cruiser-racer and first built in 1975.

== Production ==
The design was built by both Albin Marine and Shipman Sweden AB in Sweden, from 1975 to 1980, with a total of 760 boats completed, but it is now out of production.

== Design ==
The Accent 26 is a recreational keelboat, built predominantly of fibreglass, with wood trim. It has a masthead sloop rig with aluminum spars, a deck-stepped mast, wire standing rigging and a single set of unswept spreaders. The hull has a raked stem; a raised counter, reverse transom; a skeg-mounted rudder controlled by a tiller and a fixed fin keel. It displaces 5,512 lb (2,500 kg) and carries 1,962 lb (890 kg) of iron ballast.

The boat has a draft of 5.05 ft (1.54 m) with the standard keel. It is fitted with a Japanese Yanmar diesel engine of 8 hp (6 kW) for docking and manoeuvring.

The design has sleeping accommodation for six people, with a double "V"-berth in the bow cabin, an L-shaped settee and a straight settee in the main cabin and two aft quarter berths. There is a drop-leaf table in the main cabin. The galley is located on the starboard side just forward of the companionway ladder. The galley is equipped with a two-burner stove and a double sink. The enclosed head is located just aft of the bow cabin on the starboard side.

The design has a hull speed of 6.07 kn (11.24 km/h).

== Operational history ==
The prototype won the 1974 World Quarter Ton class Championships.

== See also ==
- List of sailing boat types
