= Albin Express =

Sailboat class

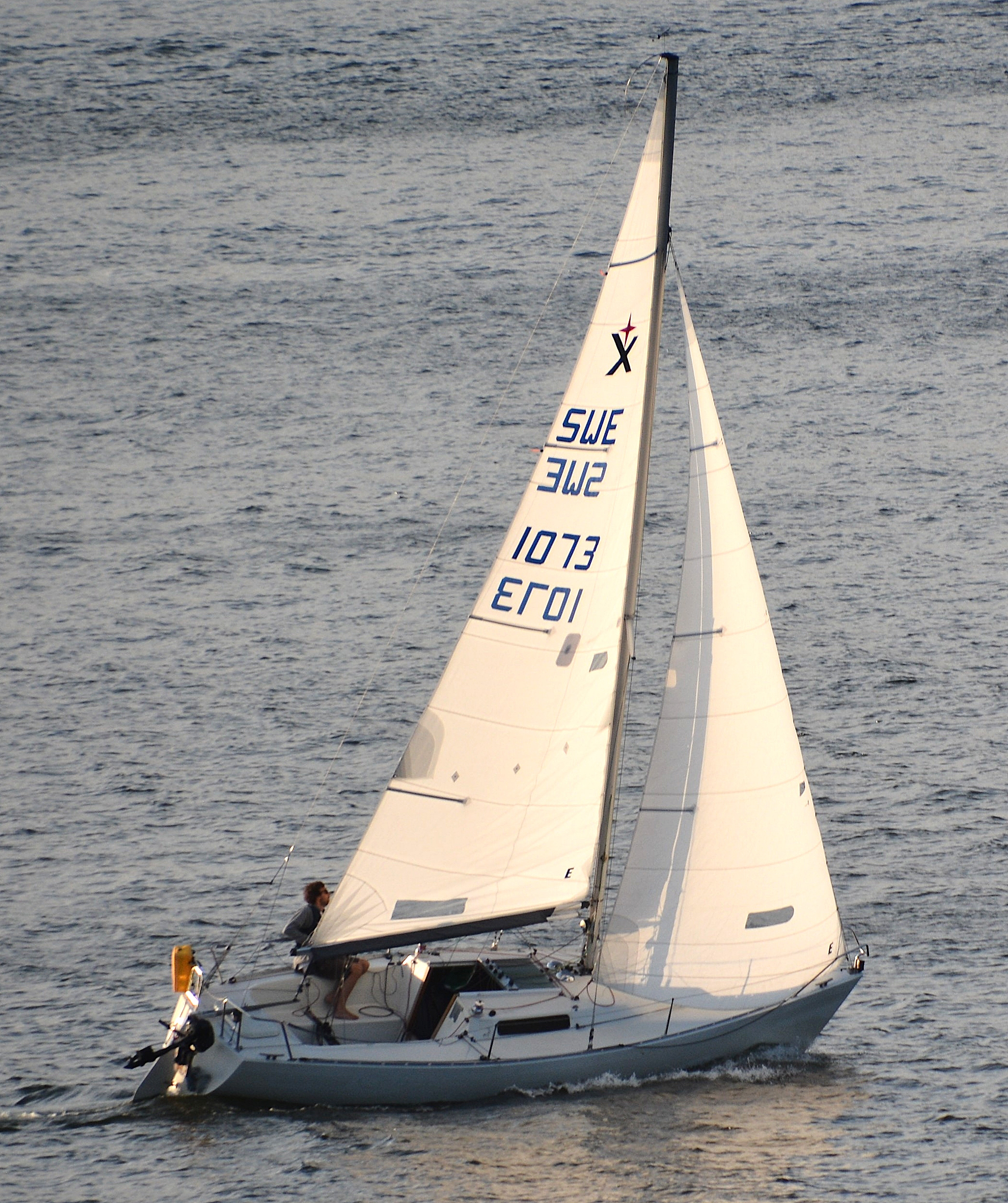

Development
- Designer: Peter Norlin
- Location: Sweden
- Year: 1978
- No. built: about 1,400
- Builder: Albin Marine
- Role: Cruiser-Racer
- Name: Albin Express

Boat
- Displacement: 3,968 lb (1,800 kg)
- Draft: 4.75 ft (1.45 m)

Hull
- Type: monohull
- Construction: fibreglass
- LOA: 25.50 ft (7.77 m)
- LWL: 21.58 ft (6.58 m)
- Beam: 8.20 ft (2.50 m)
- Engine: Outboard motor

Hull appendages
- Keel: fin keel
- Ballast: 1,764 lb (800 kg)
- Rudder: transom-mounted rudder

Rig
- Rig type: Bermuda rig
- I foretriangle height: 29.20 ft (8.90 m)
- J foretriangle base: 10.01 ft (3.05 m)
- P mainsail luff: 31.17 ft (9.50 m)
- E mainsail foot: 10.99 ft (3.35 m)

Sails
- Sailplan: Fractional rigged sloop
- Mainsail area: 188 sq ft (17.5 m^{2})
- Jib/genoa area: 111 sq ft (10.3 m^{2})
- Spinnaker area: 484 sq ft (45.0 m^{2})
- Other sails: Solent: 156 sq ft (14.5 m^{2})
- Upwind sail area: 344 sq ft (32.0 m^{2})
- Downwind sail area: 673 sq ft (62.5 m^{2})

The Albin Express is a recreational keelboat that was designed by Peter Norlin as a cruiser-racer and first built in 1978.

The design was intended as a competitor to the J/24.

== Production ==
The design was built by Albin Marine in Sweden between 1978 and 1985, with about 1,400 boats completed, but it is now out of production.

== Design ==
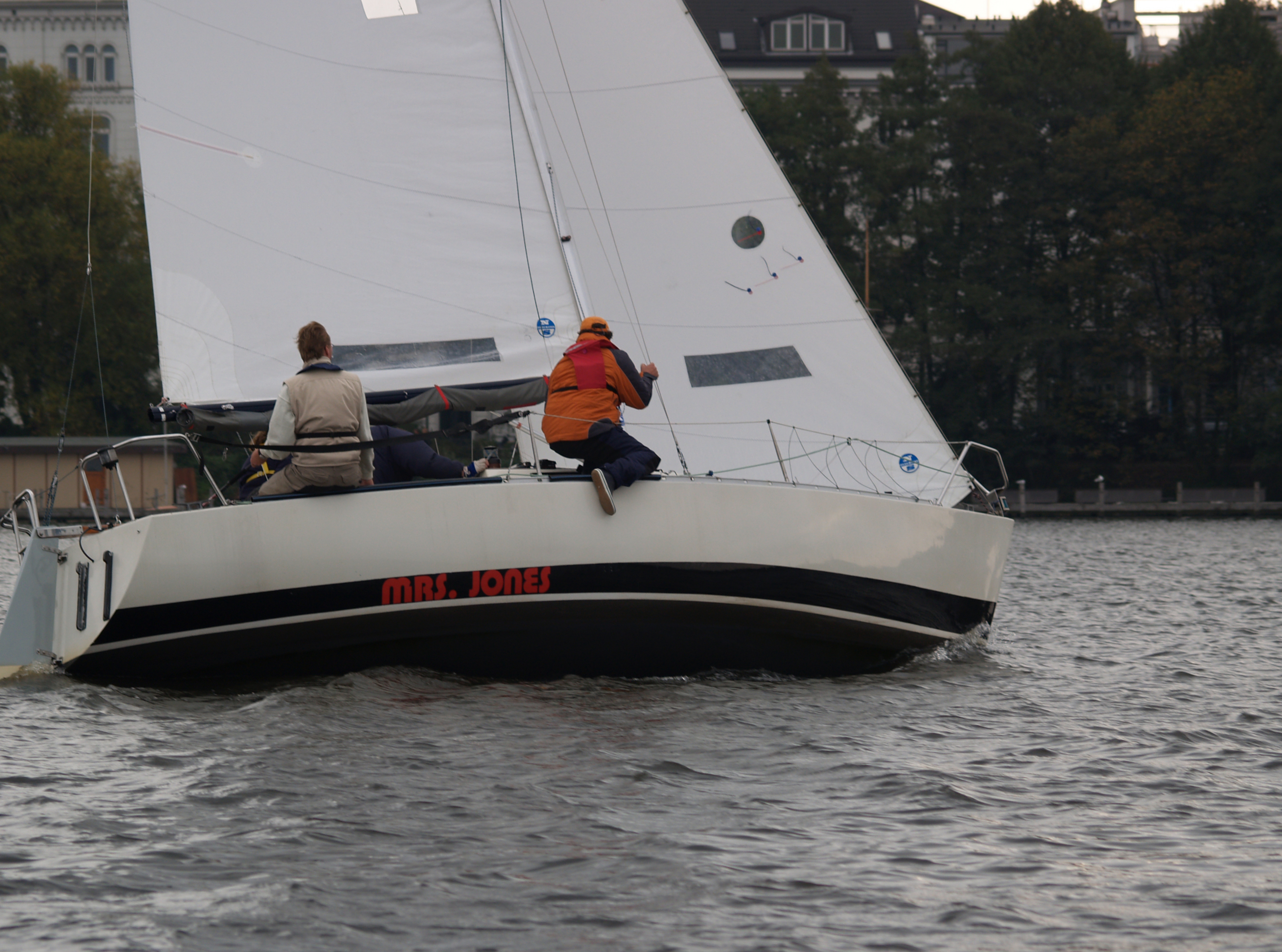
An Albin Express

The Albin Express is built predominantly of fibreglass, with wood trim. It has a 7/8 fractional sloop rig with aluminum spars, a deck-stepped mast, wire standing rigging and a single set of swept spreaders. The hull has a raked stem, a reverse transom, a transom-hung rudder controlled by a tiller and a fixed fin keel. It displaces 3,968 lb (1,800 kg) and carries 1,764 lb (800 kg) of ballast.

The boat has a draft of 4.75 ft (1.45 m) with the standard keel. The boat is normally fitted with a small outboard motor for docking and manoeuvring.

The design has sleeping accommodation for four people, with a double "V"-berth in the bow cabin, a straight settee on the port side of the main cabin and an aft cabin with a quarter berth on the port side. The galley is located on the starboard side just forward of the companionway ladder. The galley is equipped with a two-burner stove and a sink and can be slid aft to stow out of the way. The boat layout shows no provisions for a head.

For sailing the design may be equipped with a symmetrical spinnaker of 484 sq ft (45.0 m^{2}). It has a hull speed of 6.24 kn (11.56 km/h).

== Operational history ==
The boat is supported by an active class club based in Germany that organizes racing events, the Deutsche Express Klassenvereinigung (English: German Express Class Association).
