= Scampi 30 =

Sailboat class

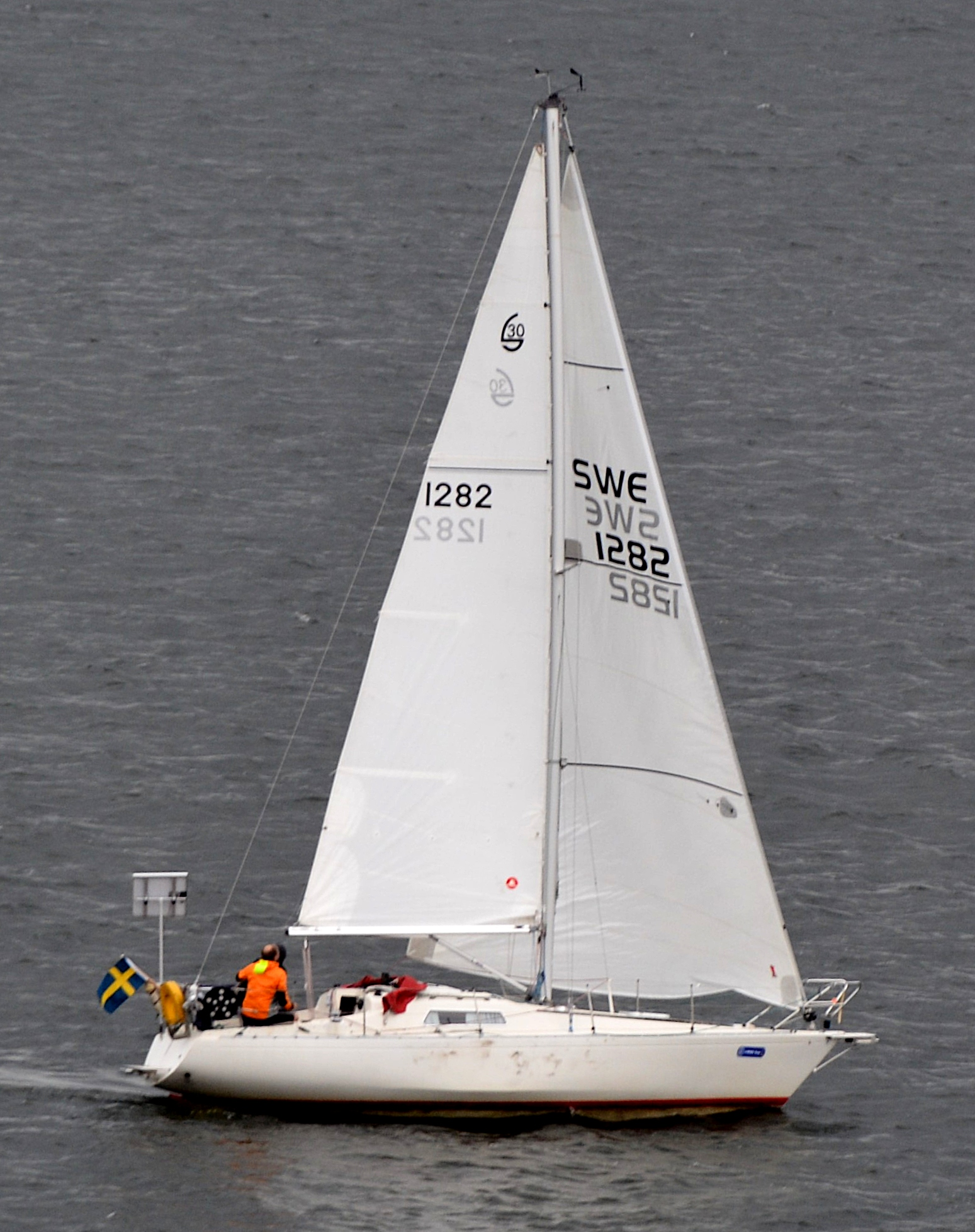

Development
- Designer: Peter Norlin
- Location: Sweden
- Year: 1970
- No. built: about 1,000
- Builders: Älvdalsplast AB; Albin Marine; Shipman Sweden AB; Nautique Saintonge; Solna Corporation; Yamaha Corporation
- Role: Cruiser-Racer
- Name: Scampi 30

Boat
- Displacement: 7,275 lb (3,300 kg)
- Draft: 5.41 ft (1.65 m)

Hull
- Type: monohull
- Construction: fibreglass
- LOA: 29.75 ft (9.07 m)
- LWL: 23.00 ft (7.01 m)
- Beam: 9.84 ft (3.00 m)
- Engine: Farymann 12 hp (9 kW) diesel engine

Hull appendages
- Keel: fin keel
- Ballast: 2,778 lb (1,260 kg)
- Rudder: skeg-mounted rudder

Rig
- Rig type: Bermuda rig
- I foretriangle height: 37.40 ft (11.40 m)
- J foretriangle base: 11.81 ft (3.60 m)
- P mainsail luff: 31.82 ft (9.70 m)
- E mainsail foot: 9.84 ft (3.00 m)

Sails
- Sailplan: masthead sloop
- Mainsail area: 167 sq ft (15.5 m^{2})
- Spinnaker area: 753 sq ft (70.0 m^{2})
- Other sails: Genoa I: 355 sq ft (33.0 m^{2}); Genoa II: 285 sq ft (26.5 m^{2}); Genoa III: 199 sq ft (18.5 m^{2}); Genoa IV: 135 sq ft (12.5 m^{2})

Racing
- PHRF: 162-192

The Scampi 30 is a family of Swedish sailboats that was designed by Peter Norlin as an International Offshore Rule (IOR) Half Ton class cruiser-racer and first built in 1970. The design was Norlin's first and proved to be both a sail racing and commercial success.

== Production ==
The design was built in four versions by a number of different builders, including Älvdalsplast AB, Shipman Sweden AB and Albin Marine (all in Sweden), Nautic Saintonge in France, Yamaha Corporation in Japan and the Solna Corporation in the US. Production ceased in 1982, with about 1,000 boats of all marks built.

Sailboatdata.com notes, "the Scampi was Peter Norlin's first yacht design. It's hard to think of a case where the first effort of any designer achieved similar success."

== Design ==
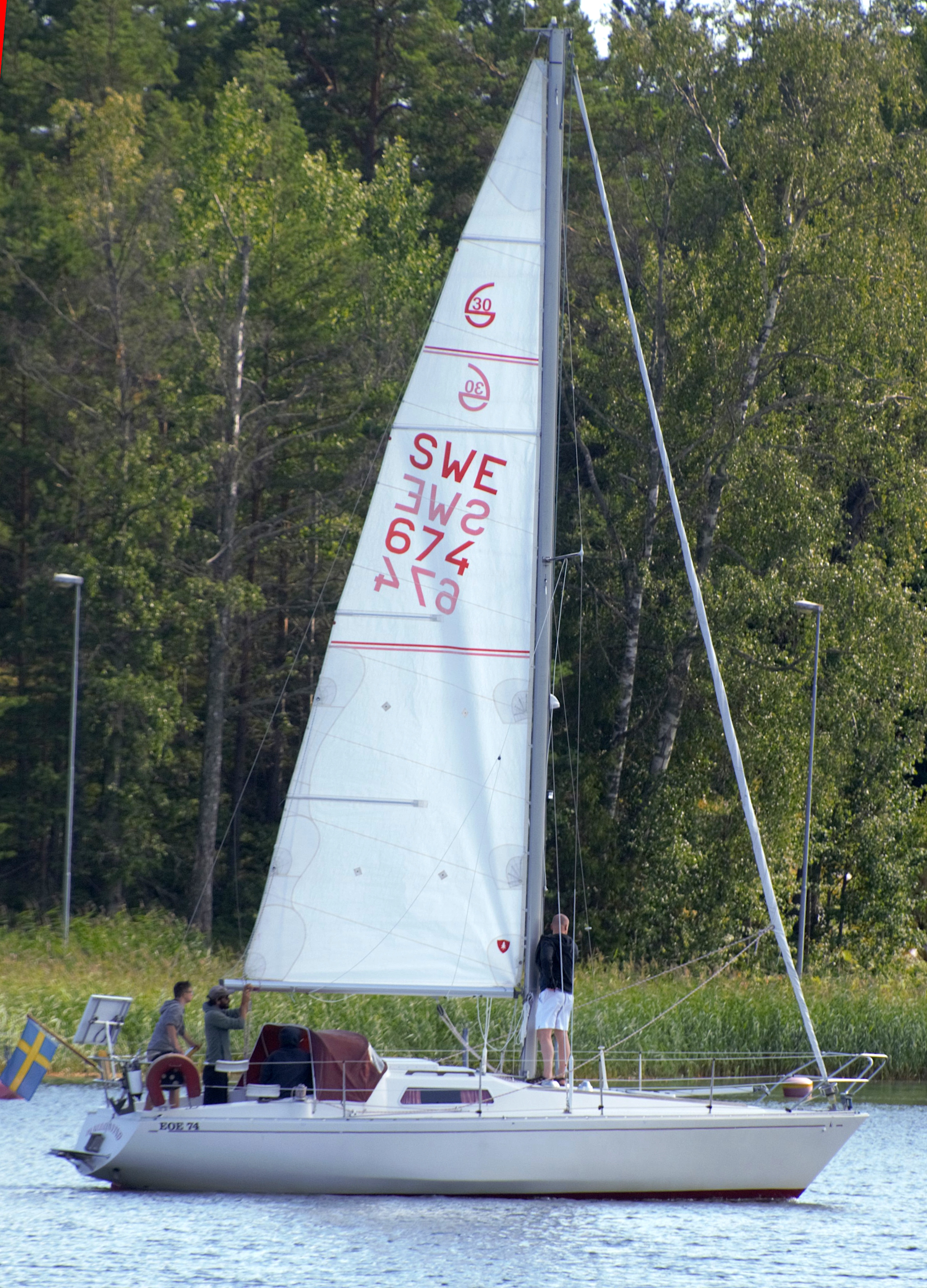
Scampi 30

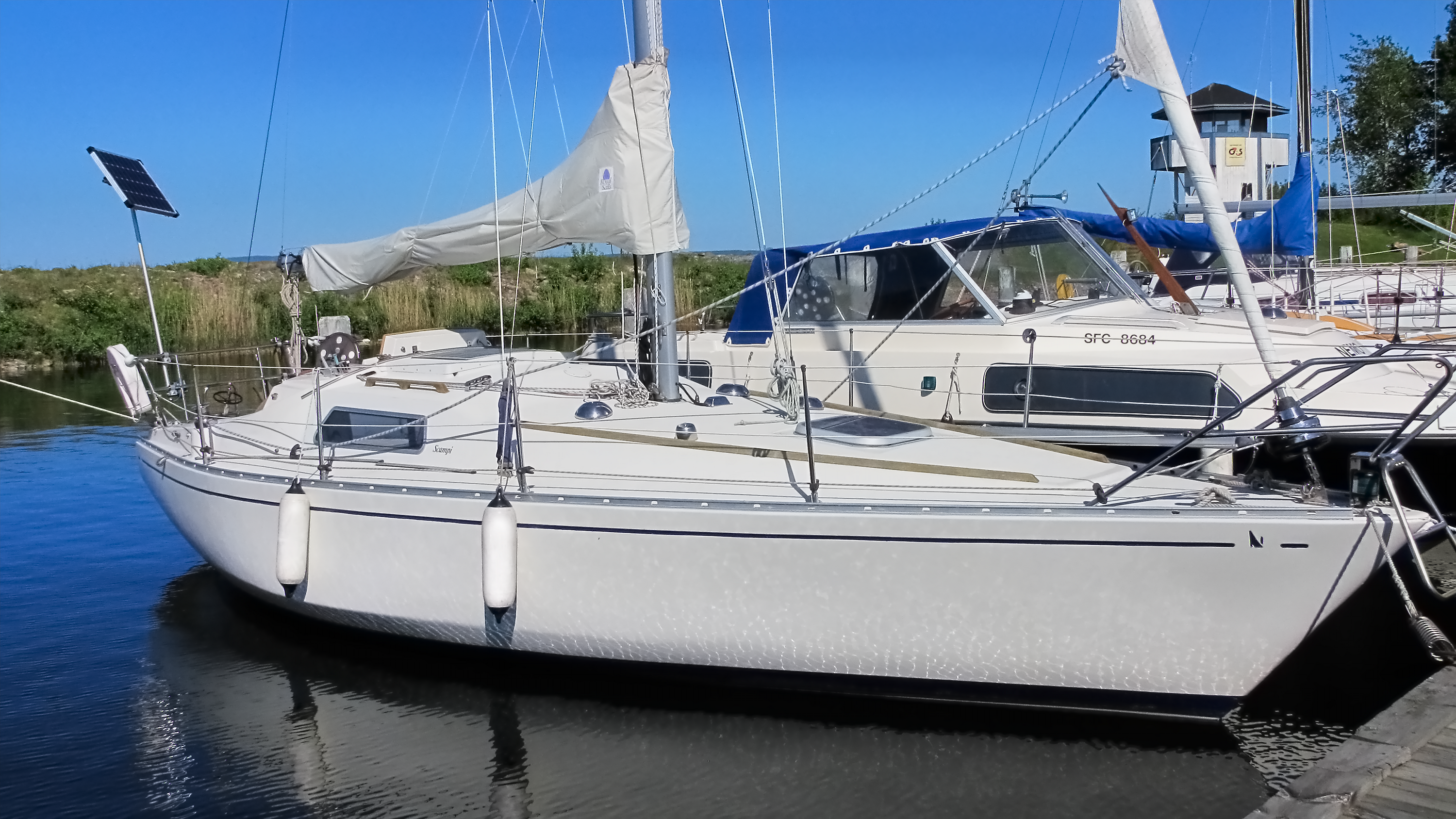
Scampi 30

The Scampi 30 was designed as an IOR Half Ton class boat.

The Scampi 30 is a recreational keelboat, built predominantly of fibreglass, with wood trim. All versions have masthead sloop rigs with aluminum spars, deck-stepped masts, wire standing rigging and a single set of unswept spreaders. The hulls all have raked stems; raised counter, reverse transoms; skeg-mounted rudders controlled by a tiller and a fixed fin keels. All models displace 7,275 lb (3,300 kg) and carry 2,778 lb (1,260 kg) of ballast.

All versions have a draft of 5.41 ft (1.65 m) with the standard keel.

The design has sleeping accommodation for five people, with a double "V"-berth in the bow cabin, two straight settees in the main cabin and an aft cabin with a single quarter berth on the port side. The galley is located on the starboard side just forward of the companionway ladder. The galley is equipped with a three-burner stove and a sink. A navigation station is opposite the galley, on the port side. The head is located just aft of the bow cabin on the port side.

All models have hull speeds of 6.42 kn (11.89 km/h).

The Scampi 30 has a PHRF racing handicap of 162 to 192.

== Variants ==
Scampi 30-1 (Mk I)
There was just one Mk I built, the prototype, which won the Half Ton Cup in 1969, held under Royal Ocean Racing Club (RORC) handicapping rules.
Scampi 30-2 (Mk II)
This model was introduced in 1970 and produced by Älvdalsplast AB in Sweden until 1971 and Nautic Saintonge in France, with at least 50 boats built. Racing under the new IOR it placed first and second in 1970. It has a length overall of 29.75 ft (9.1 m) and has a waterline length of 23.00 ft (7.0 m). The boat is fitted with a Farymann diesel engine of 12 hp (9 kW). The fuel tank holds 20 U.S. gallons (76 L; 17 imp gal) and the fresh water tank has a capacity of 30 U.S. gallons (110 L; 25 imp gal).
Scampi 30-3 (Mk III)
This model was introduced in 1971 and built until 1973, with nearly 200 boats built. It was built by several companies, including the Yamaha Corporation in Japan, as the original Yamaha 30. It has a length overall of 29.75 ft (9.1 m) and has a waterline length of 22.97 ft (7.0 m). In the International Half Ton Cup competition held in the United Kingdom it took first, second and third places.
Scampi 30-4 (Mk IV)
This model was introduced in 1973 and built until 1982, with about 750 boats completed. It was built by Älvdalsplast AB from 1973 to 1974, by Shipman Sweden AB in 1975, by Albin Marine from 1976 to 1982 and by the Solna Corporation. It has a length overall of 29.75 ft (9.1 m) and has a waterline length of 22.97 ft (7.0 m).\ The boat is fitted with a Japanese Yanmar diesel engine of 12 hp (9 kW). The fuel tank holds 13 U.S. gallons (49 L; 11 imp gal) and the fresh water tank has a capacity of 30 U.S. gallons (110 L; 25 imp gal).

== Operational history ==
The boat is supported by an active class club based in Sweden, that organizes racing events, the Scampiförbundet (English: The Scampi Association).

== See also ==
- List of sailing boat types
