= Shipman 28 =

Sailboat class

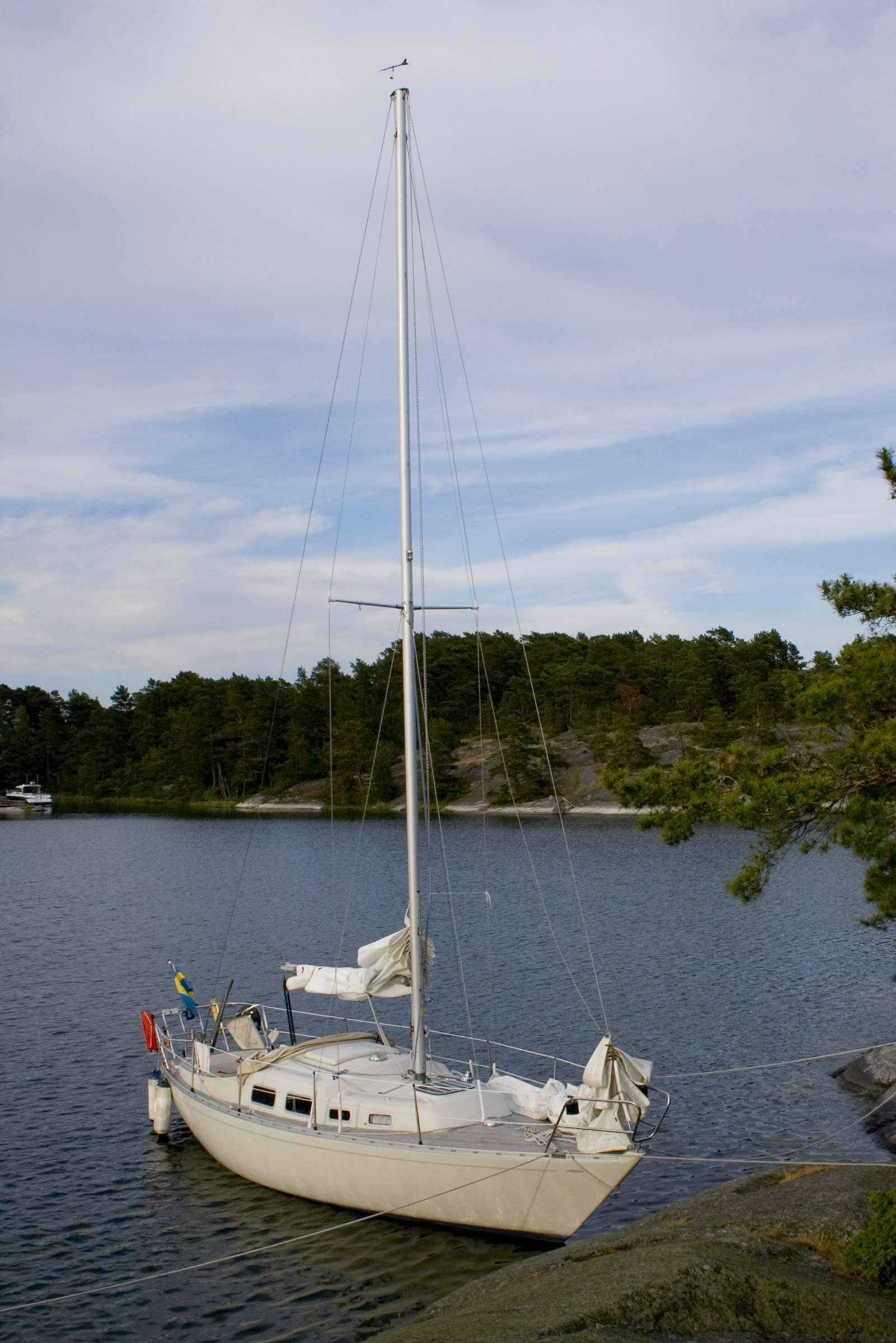

Development
- Designer: Olle Enderlein
- Location: Sweden
- Year: 1969
- No. built: about 1,000
- Builders: Shipman Sweden AB; Fiberman Composite Racing Products; Visby; Albin Marine; Baltic Marine
- Role: Cruiser
- Name: Shipman 28

Boat
- Displacement: 6,614 lb (3,000 kg)
- Draft: 5.09 ft (1.55 m)

Hull
- Type: monohull
- Construction: fibreglass
- LOA: 29.06 ft (8.86 m)
- LWL: 21.00 ft (6.40 m)
- Beam: 8.53 ft (2.60 m)
- Engine: Faryman A40 12 hp (9 kW) diesel engine Hydrostatic transmission (Hydromarine)

Hull appendages
- Keel: fin keel
- Ballast: 2,667 lb (1,210 kg)
- Rudder: skeg-mounted rudder

Rig
- Rig type: Bermuda rig
- I foretriangle height: 35.10 ft (10.70 m)
- J foretriangle base: 10.66 ft (3.25 m)
- P mainsail luff: 31.82 ft (9.70 m)
- E mainsail foot: 10.17 ft (3.10 m)

Sails
- Sailplan: masthead sloop
- Mainsail area: 175 sq ft (16.3 m^{2})
- Jib/genoa area: 132 sq ft (12.3 m^{2})
- Spinnaker area: 646 sq ft (60.0 m^{2})
- Gennaker area: 285 sq ft (26.5 m^{2})
- Other sails: Storm jib: 58 sq ft (5.4 m^{2})
- Upwind sail area: 461 sq ft (42.8 m^{2})
- Downwind sail area: 821 sq ft (76.3 m^{2})

The Shipman 28, also sold as the Baltic 28, is a Swedish sailboat that was designed by Olle Enderlein as a cruiser and first built in 1969.

== Production ==
The design was built by Shipman Sweden AB, Visby and Albin Marine, all in Sweden and Fiberman Composite Racing Products in the Republic of Ireland. About 1,000 boats were completed between 1969 and 1979, but it is now out of production.

The boat was also built by Baltic Marine and sold as the Baltic 28.

== Design ==
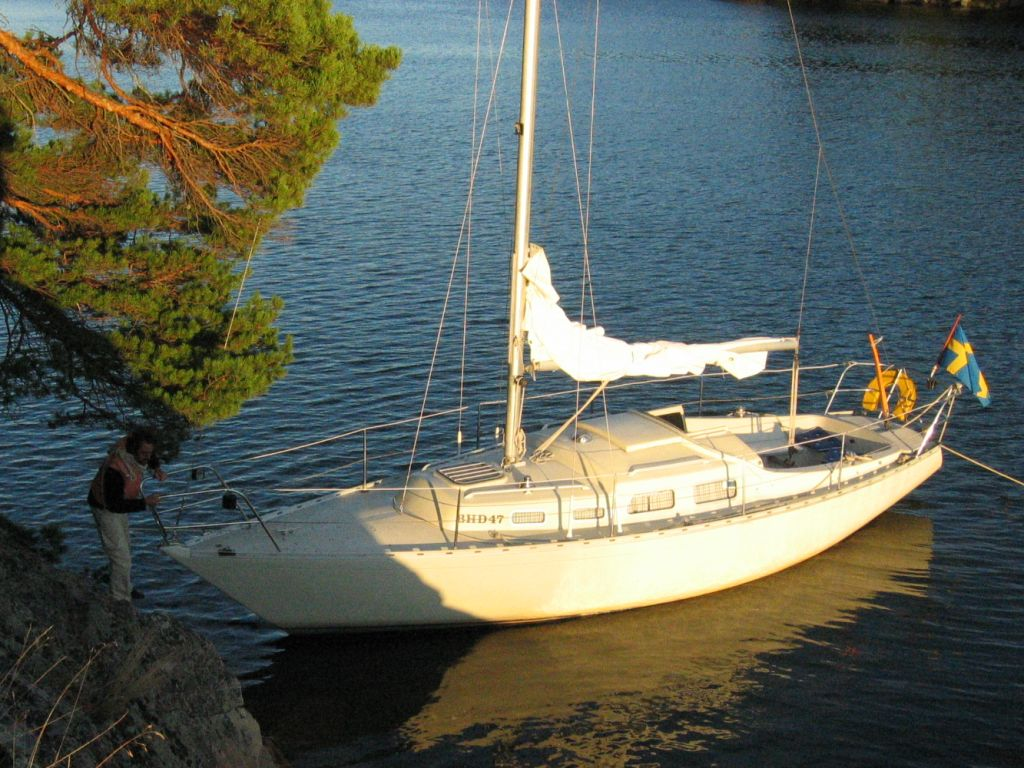
Shipman 28

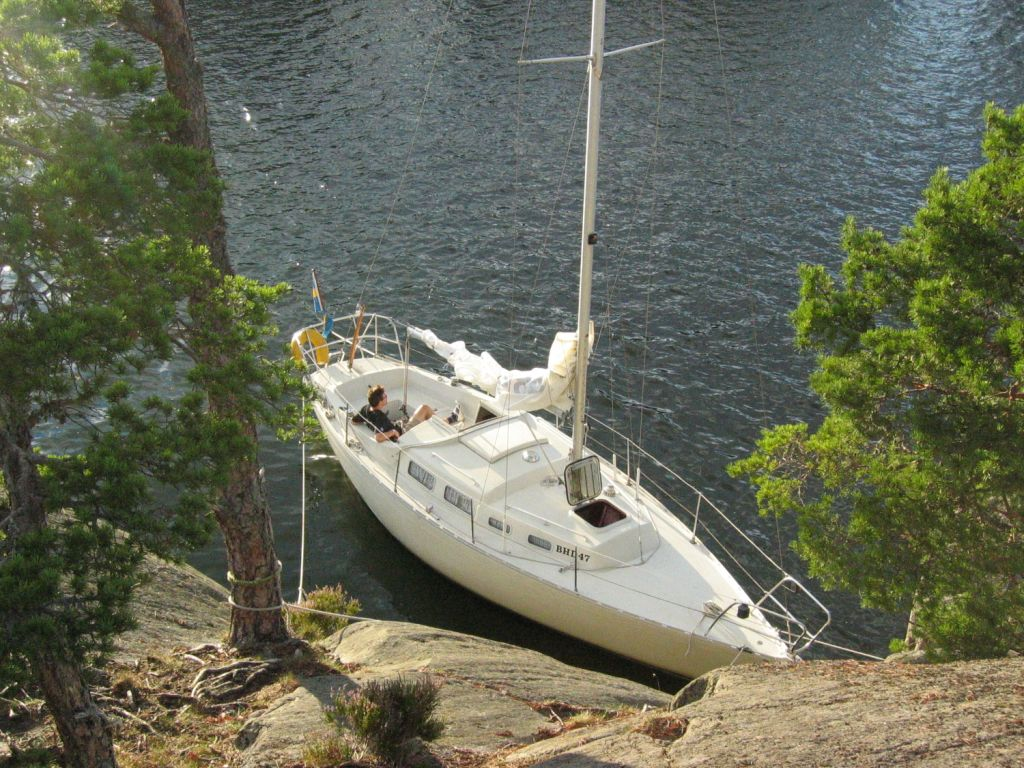
Shipman 28

The Shipman 28 is a recreational keelboat, built predominantly of fibreglass. It has a masthead sloop rig with aluminum spars, a deck-stepped mast, wire standing rigging and a single set of unswept spreaders. The hull has a spooned raked stem; a raised counter, reverse transom; a skeg-mounted rudder controlled by a tiller and a fixed fin keel. It displaces 6,614 lb (3,000 kg) and carries 2,667 lb (1,210 kg) of ballast.

The boat has a draft of 5.09 ft (1.55 m) with the standard keel and is fitted with a Faryman a40 diesel engine of 8 to 12 hp (6 to 9 kW) with hydraulic (Hydromarine) transmission for docking and manoeuvring.

The design has sleeping accommodation for four people (six when fold navigation table), with a double "V"-berth in the bow cabin, a straight settee in the main cabin and an aft cabin with a single berth on the starboard side. The galley is located on the port side at the companionway ladder. The galley is equipped with a two-burner stove and a single stainless steel sink. A dinette table is opposite the galley, on the starboard side. The head is located just aft of the bow cabin on the starboard side.

The maximum below-decks headroom is 71 in (180 cm) in the main cabin. The saloon has 62 in (157 cm) of headroom and the aft cabin 61 in (155 cm).

For sailing downwind the design may be equipped with a symmetrical spinnaker of 646 sq ft (60.0 m^{2}). It has a hull speed of 6.49 kn (12.02 km/h).

== Operational history ==
The boat is supported by an active class club based in Denmark, that organizes racing events, the Shipman 28 Klubben (English: Shipman 28 Club).

== See also ==
- List of sailing boat types
