= Albin 7.8 =

Sailboat class

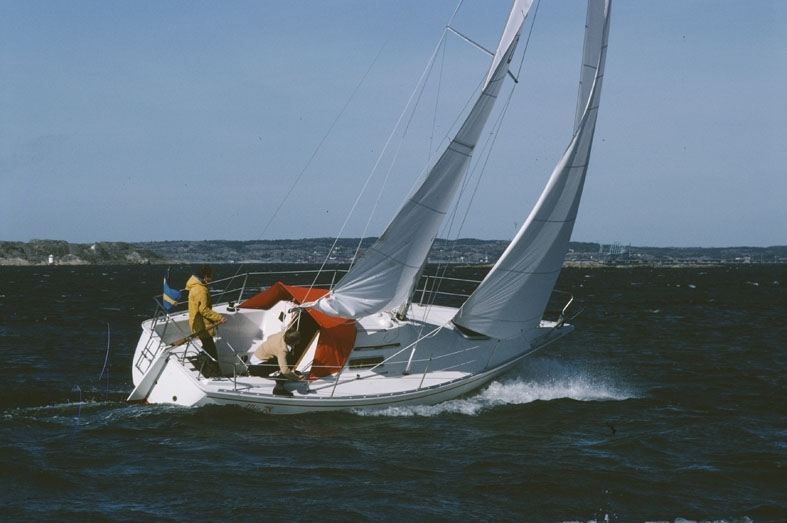

Development
- Designer: Peter Norlin
- Location: Sweden
- Year: 1979
- Builder: Albin Marine

Boat
- Displacement: 5,181 lb (2,350 kg)
- Draft: 4.89 ft (1.49 m)

Hull
- Type: monohull
- Construction: fibreglass
- LOA: 25.59 ft (7.80 m)
- LWL: 21.82 ft (6.65 m)
- Beam: 9.06 ft (2.76 m)
- Engine: Volvo Penta MD5 diesel engine

Hull appendages
- Keel: fin keel
- Ballast: 2,094 lb (950 kg)
- Rudder: transom-mounted rudder

Rig
- Rig type: Bermuda rig
- I foretriangle height: 30.51 ft (9.30 m)
- J foretriangle base: 9.35 ft (2.85 m)
- P mainsail luff: 31.17 ft (9.50 m)
- E mainsail foot: 8.86 ft (2.70 m)

Sails
- Sailplan: fractional rigged sloop
- Mainsail area: 138.08 sq ft (12.828 m^{2})
- Jib/genoa area: 142.63 sq ft (13.251 m^{2})
- Total sail area: 280.72 sq ft (26.080 m^{2})

The Albin 7.8, also known as the Albin Cirrus and the Cirrus 7.8, is a Swedish sailboat that was designed by Peter Norlin and first built in 1979.

== Production ==
The design was built by Albin Marine in Sweden between 1979 and 1984, but it is now out of production.

== Design ==
The Albin 7.8 is a recreational keelboat, built predominantly of fibreglass. It has a fractional sloop rig, a raked stem, a reverse transom, a transom-hung rudder controlled by a tiller and a fixed fin keel. It displaces 5,181 lb (2,350 kg) and carries 2,094 lb (950 kg) of ballast.

The boat has a draft of 4.89 ft (1.49 m) with the standard keel.

The boat is fitted with a Swedish Volvo Penta MD5 diesel engine for docking and manoeuvring. The fuel tank holds 5 U.S. gallons (19 L; 4.2 imp gal) and the fresh water tank has a capacity of 17 U.S. gallons (64 L; 14 imp gal).

The design has a hull speed of 6.26 kn (11.59 km/h).

== Operational history ==
The boat was at one time supported by an active class club based in Sweden that organized racing events, the Albin 78 Klubben (English: Albin 78 Club).

== See also ==
- List of sailing boat types
