= Albin Marine =

Sailboat manufacturer

- Native name: Albin Marin
- Company type: Privately held company
- Industry: Boat building
- Founded: 1956
- Defunct: 1982
- Headquarters: Sweden
- Products: Marine engines Sailboats

Albin Marine was a Swedish boat builder. The company specialized in the design and manufacture of fiberglass sailboats.

== History ==
In 1899, Lars Albin Larsson founded Albin Motors in Kristinehamn, building marine engines. In 1956, the managing director Lars Larsson decided to get into the boat business and started Larsson Trade AB to export boats built by Harry Hallberg to the United States of America. In 1964, the company decided to build its own fiberglass boats, first with the Vega 27 in 1965. In 1971, the company was renamed to Albin Marin, while Albin Marine was used in english-speaking countries. Some of its later sailboats were produced under contract in Taiwan. The company produced sailboats from 19 to 41 ft (5.8 to 12.5 m) length overall, many of which were designed by Swedish designers Peter Norlin and Per Brohäll.

In 1973, Albin Marin was sold to Pribo, and in 1982, it filed for bankruptcy. The insolvency assets was bought to create Nya Albin Marin, and further boats were produced, later also by other boat builders. In 2008 the company's brand was purchased by an American company and it was used for a line of powerboats.

== Boats ==
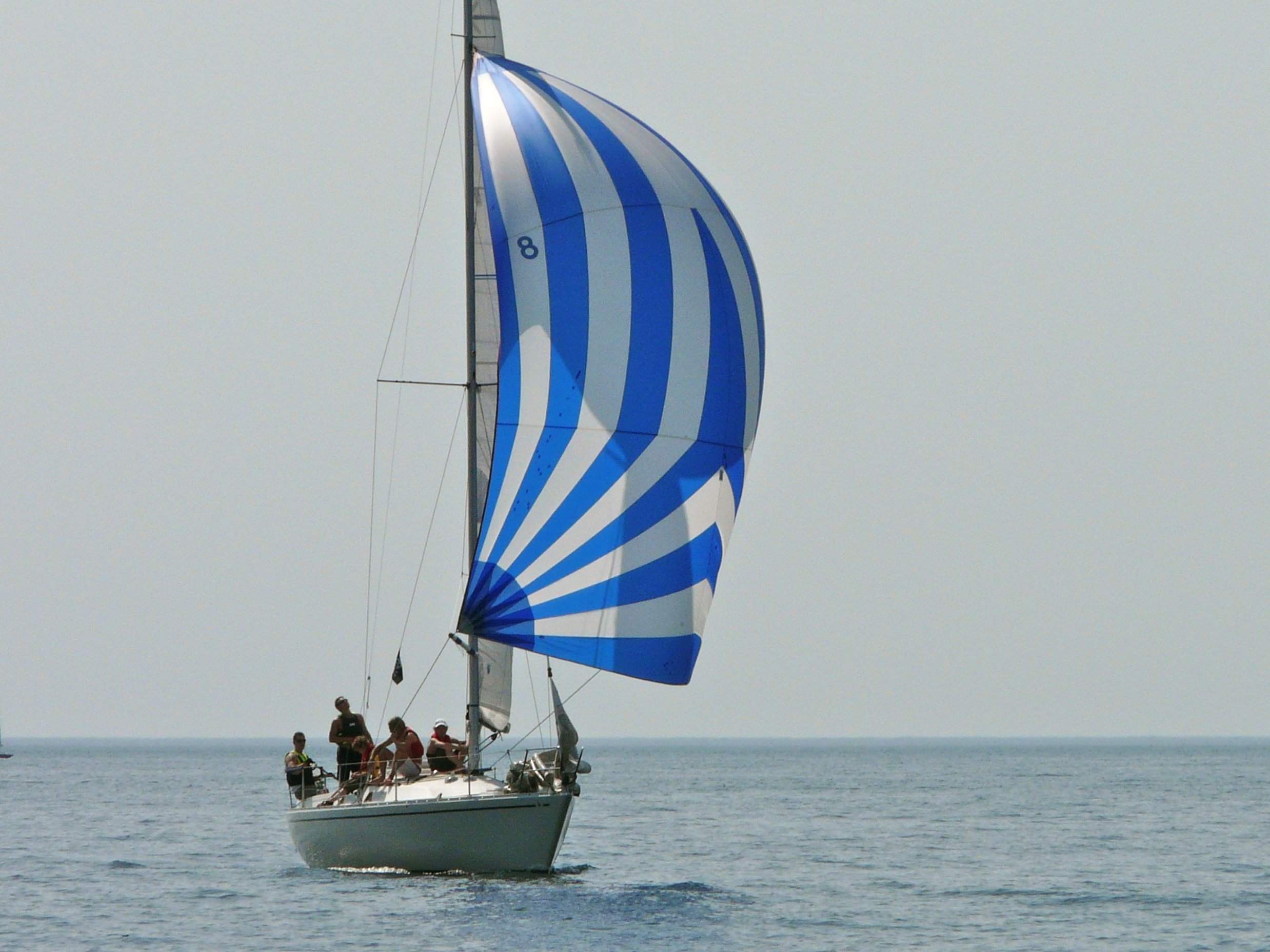
Nova 33

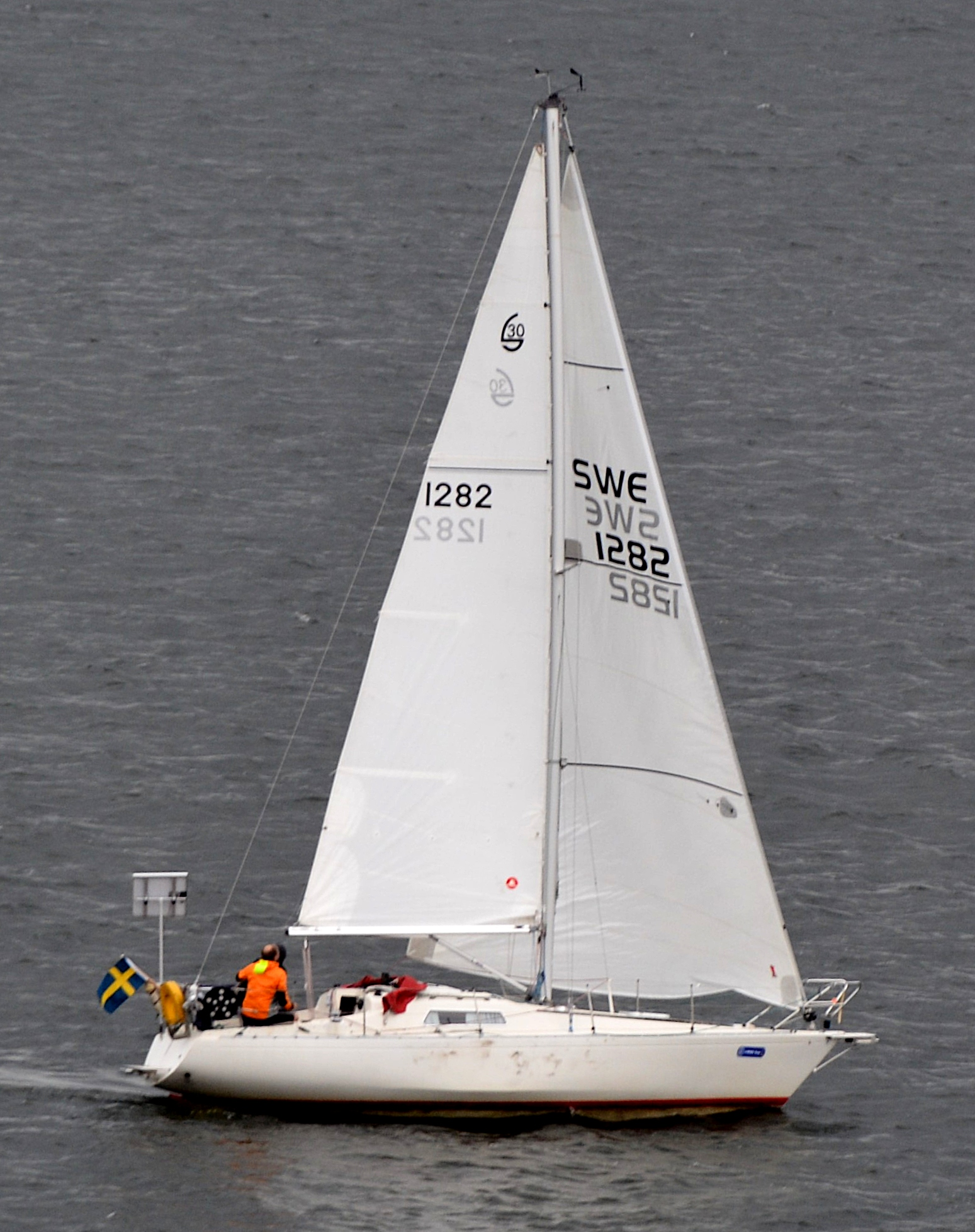
Scampi 30

Summary of boats built by Albin Marine:

- Vega 27 - 1965
- Viggen 23 - 1966
- Shipman 28 - 1969
- Scampi 30-2 - 1970
- Singoalla 34 - 1970
- Ballad 30 - 1971
- Scampi 30-4 - 1973
- Albin 79 - 1974
- Accent 26 - 1975
- Albin 82 MS - 1975
- Albin 57 - 1977
- Albin Express - 1978
- Cumulus 28 - 1978
- Albin 7.8 - 1979
- Cirrus 7.8 - 1979
- Stratus 36 - 1980
- Nimbus 42 - 1981
- Nova 33 - 1981
- Delta 31 - 1983
- Alpha 29 - 1984

== See also ==
- List of sailboat designers and manufacturers
