= Albin Vega =

1960s Swedish recreational keelboat

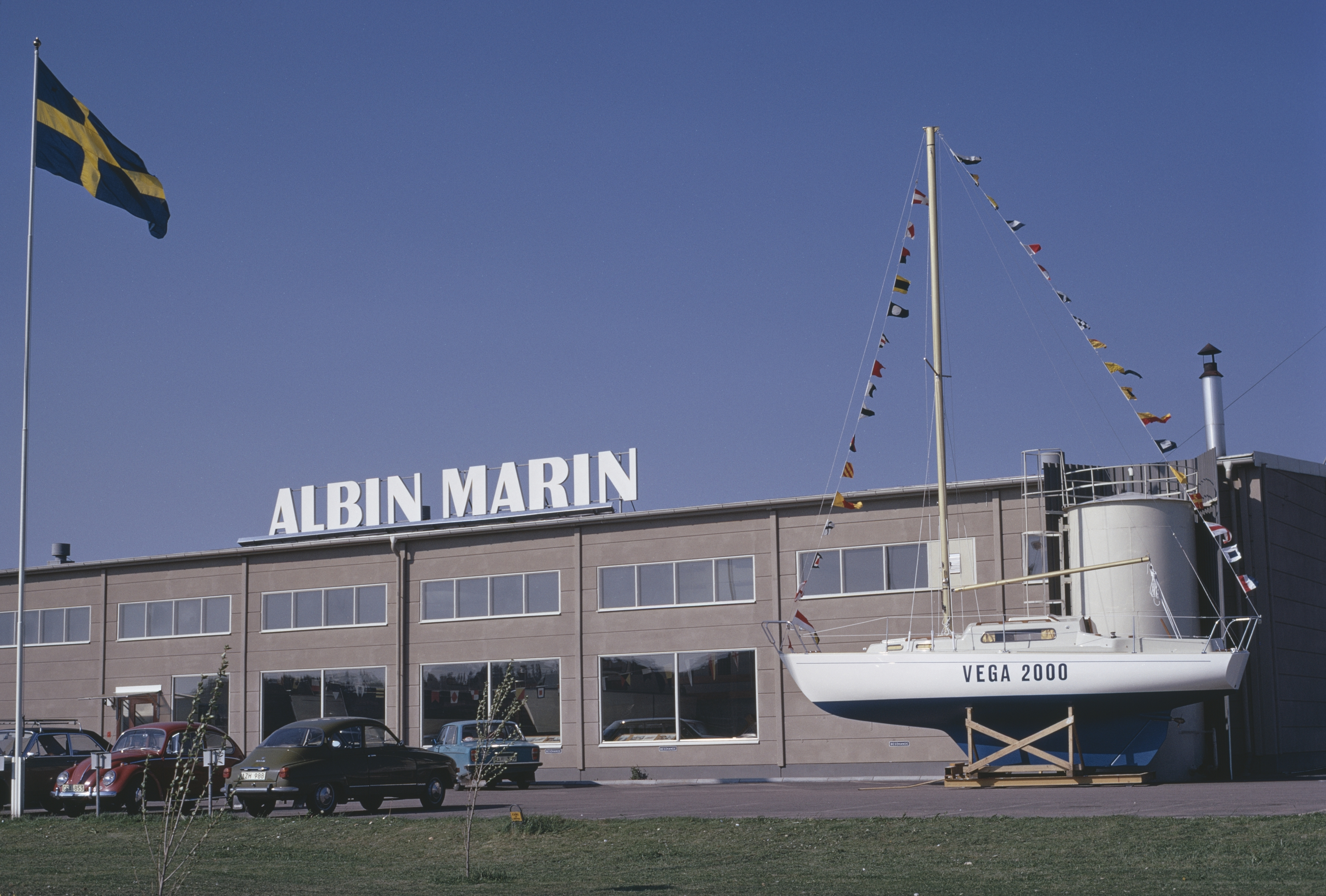

Development
- Designer: Per Brohäll
- Location: Sweden
- Year: 1965
- No. built: about 3450
- Builder: Albin Marine
- Role: Cruiser

Boat
- Displacement: 5,070 lb (2,300 kg)
- Draft: 3.67 ft (1.12 m)

Hull
- Type: monohull
- Construction: fibreglass
- LOA: 27.08 ft (8.25 m)
- LWL: 23.00 ft (7.01 m)
- Beam: 8.08 ft (2.46 m)
- Engine: Volvo Penta MD6A 13 hp (10 kW) diesel engine

Hull appendages
- Keel: modified long keel
- Ballast: 2,017 lb (915 kg)
- Rudder: keel-mounted rudder

Rig
- Rig type: Bermuda rig
- I foretriangle height: 30.80 ft (9.39 m)
- J foretriangle base: 10.17 ft (3.10 m)
- P mainsail luff: 25.92 ft (7.90 m)
- E mainsail foot: 10.83 ft (3.30 m)

Sails
- Sailplan: masthead sloop
- Mainsail area: 159 sq ft (14.8 m^{2})
- Jib/genoa area: 145 sq ft (13.5 m^{2})
- Spinnaker area: 506 sq ft (47.0 m^{2})
- Gennaker area: 243 sq ft (22.6 m^{2})
- Other sails: Solent: 212 sq ft (19.7 m^{2}); Staysail: 58 sq ft (5.4 m^{2})
- Upwind sail area: 403 sq ft (37.4 m^{2})
- Downwind sail area: 665 sq ft (61.8 m^{2})

The Albin Vega is a recreational keelboat built by Albin Marine in Sweden from 1965 to 1979 with about 3,450 completed.

The narrow fibreglass hull has a keel-mounted rudder controlled by a tiller and a fixed modified long keel, with a cutaway forefoot. It has a slight reverse sheer.

It is a masthead sloop with a deck-stepped mast and a single set of unswept spreaders. It may be equipped with a spinnaker. It sails well in a range of conditions and is well balanced.

Early models used Volvo Penta MB10A 15 hp or Albin 022 13 hp gasoline engines. Volvo diesels were offered starting in 1972 with the 10 hp MD6A. the placement of the propeller aft of the rudder can affect motoring in reverse.

It has four berths. The galley is on both sides of the companionway ladder, with the two-burner stove to port and the sink to starboard. A navigation station is on the starboard side. With an 8-foot beam, the cabin is smaller than that typically found on more recent designs. Cabin headroom is 170 cm. The head and V-berth are enclosed from the main cabin.

== Gallery ==
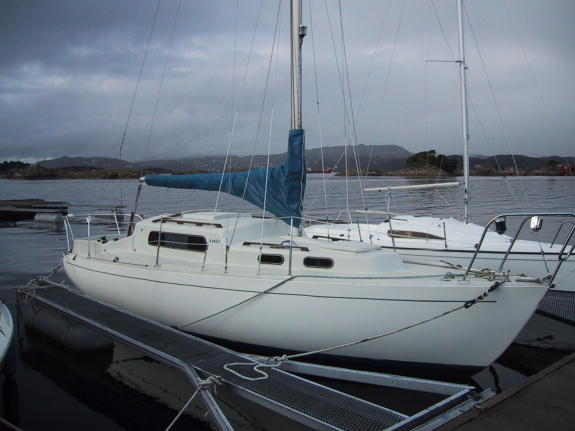

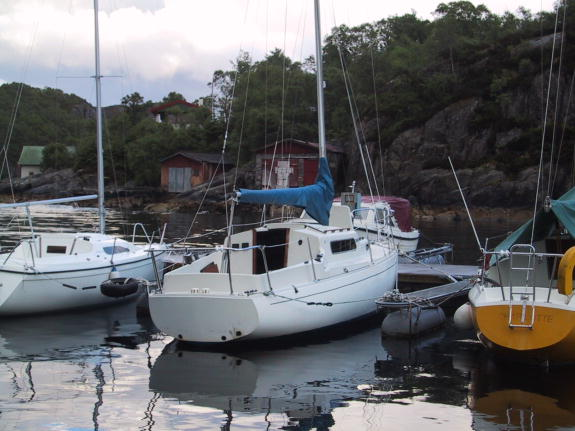

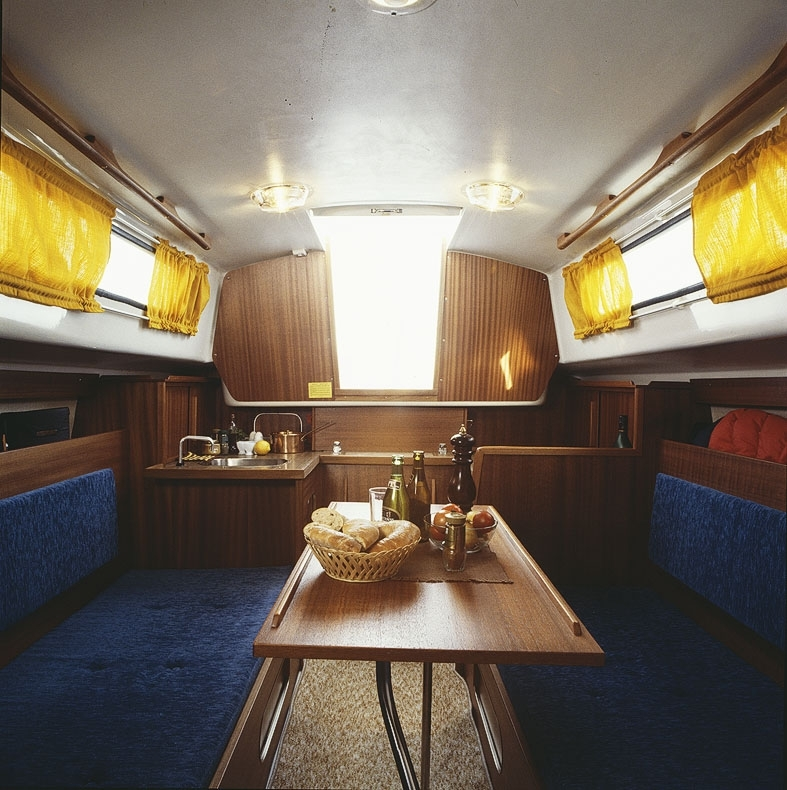

== See also ==
- Jarle Andhøy: sailed an Albin Vega in the polar regions.
- Matt Rutherford: did a solo circumnavigation of North and South America in an Albin Vega.
