= Matt Rutherford (sailor) =

Long distance sailer and circumnavigator

Matthew Rutherford (born 1980) is a sailor, best known for his 2011 solo circumnavigation of the Americas in a recreational sailing yacht.

== Circumnavigation of the Americas ==
Rutherford set off from Annapolis, Maryland on 13 June 2011, sailing north from the Chesapeake Bay in the Albin Vega St. Brendan.

The voyage took Rutherford up the east coast of the US and Canada. It then took him up the west coast of Greenland into Baffin Bay, to a northerly most point of 75° 21' north before undertaking the Northwest Passage, becoming the smallest boat ever to successfully undertake the passage. On 28 August 2011, Rutherford passed Point Barrow, Alaska.

Sailing south, Rutherford reached the equator on 13 November 2011, having been at sea for 152 days and covering 13,334 nautical miles.

He rounded Cape Horn on 5 January 2012, the 208th day of the voyage.

Rutherford returned to Annapolis on 21 April 2012 after 309 days at sea, having raised $79,393 for Chesapeake Region Accessible Boating (CRAB), an organization that provides sailing opportunities for the disabled, although nearly half of that was spent on replacing critical equipment that had failed during his trip.

== Circumnavigation of the Arctic Ocean ==
In 2026 Rutherford attempted a solo circumnavigation of the Arctic Ocean but was forced to postpone after Russian authorities declared the route impassable due to ice conditions. The route would have taken him about 10,000 nautical miles anti-clockwise around the arctic from late June to October aboard his 42-foot Valiant ketch. Conditions in the East Siberian and Chukchi sea, as well as heavy ice near Wrangel Island were cited as factors by the Russian Northern Sea Route Administration.

After turning around near Ushakov Island in August, he stated his intention to return the following year.

== Film and podcast ==
Rutherford's circumnavigation of the Americas was the subject of a documentary film by Amy Flannery, titled "Red Dot on the Ocean: The Matt Rutherford Story" made in 2014. Rutherford's voyage has also been the subject of a series of episodes on The Explorers Podcast, which focuses on voyages of exploration through history, and is hosted by Matt Breen. The first of the three Rutherford episodes was released on 7 Feb 2023.

== Awards ==
Matt Rutherford was named the 2021 Young Voyager Award winner by the Cruising Club of America.
