= Decimetre =

Unit of length 1/10 of a metre

decimetre
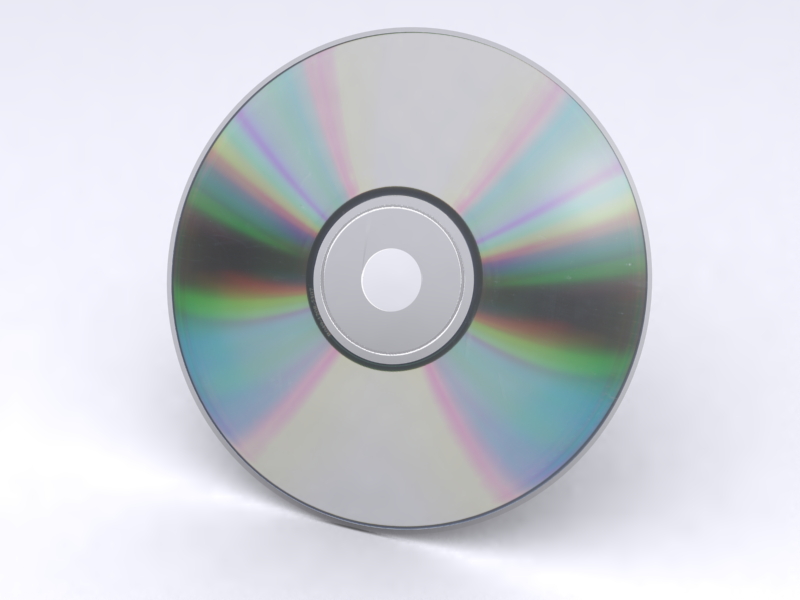
- A standard CD is 120 millimetres (1.2 decimetres) in diameter.

General information
- Unit system: SI
- Unit of: length
- Symbol: dm

Conversions
1 dm in ...	... is equal to ...
- SI base units: 0.1 m
- imperial/US units: 3.9370 in; 3937.0 thou

The decimetre (decimeter in American English; symbol: dm) is a unit of length in the International System of Units, equal to one tenth of a metre, ten centimetres, one hundred millimetres, and 3.937 inches.

The common non-SI metric unit of volume, the litre, is defined as one cubic decimetre, although, from 1901 to 1964, there was a slight difference between the two due to the litre being defined using the kilogram rather than the metre.

The path length when measuring a chemical compound's specific rotation is measured in decimetres.

Markings of a ship's draught are shown in decimetres in most of the world.

== See also ==
- Metric prefix
- Deci-
- Orders of magnitude (length) § 1 decimetre
- Conversion of units, for comparison with other units of length.
