= One Ton Cup =

Sailing trophy

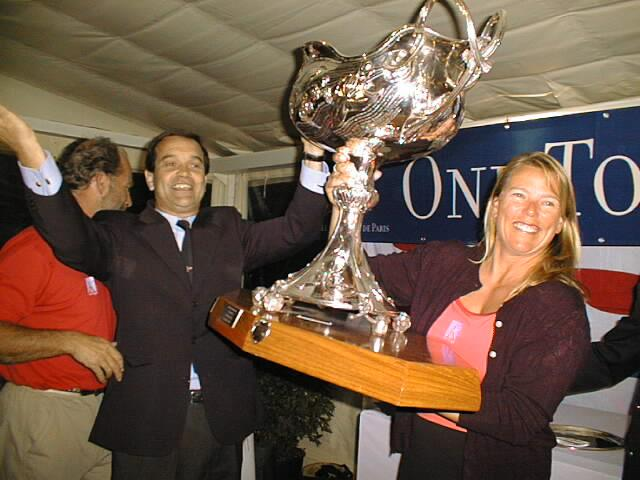
One Ton Cup prize-giving in Saint-Tropez in 2002

The One Ton Cup is a trophy presented to the winner of a sailing competition created in 1899 by the Cercle de la voile de Paris (CVP).

== Synopsis ==
The One Ton Cup regattas were at the beginning of races between one-tonner sailing dinghies, according to the 1899 Godinet rule. This Coupe internationale du Cercle de la voile de Paris, its original name, was raced from 1907 until 1962 on boats that measured the International gaff-rigged 6 Metre rule, except for four years, from 1920 to 1923, where it was raced on 6.5m SI. In 1965, after three years vacant, the One Ton Cup was transformed into a scope suitable for ocean racing on the initiative of Jean Peytel, member of the CVP, following the activity slowdown of the 6m JI class. The One Ton Cup was then raced according to the RORC rule on 22 feet boats, and on IOR rule on 27.5 feet boats from 1971, followed by IOR rule 30.5 feet in 1984. In 1999, the One Ton Cup was allotted to the Corel 45 class world championship, renamed IC 45, a one-design boat designed by Bruce Farr. In 2016 the Cup was allocated to the FAST40+ Class for a regatta to be sailed in the Solent from September 16 to 18.

== History ==
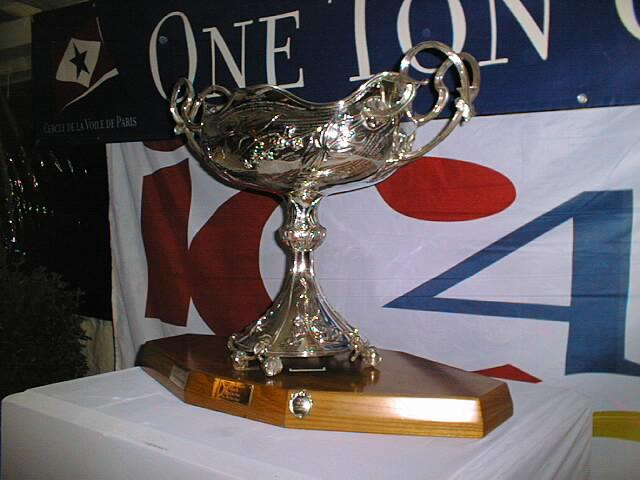
The One Ton Cup

Mr Mantois, vice-president of the Cercle de la voile de Paris, announced the creation of the International One Ton Cup on 11 October 1898. It had to be raced on the Seine River at Meulan, home of the CVP or in Cowes if owned by a foreigner. The yachts had to have a tonnage certificate of one ton at the most according to the Godinet rule of 1892.

=== The silver cup ===
The cup was designed in 1897 by the jeweller Robert Linzeler and was made by Bratiau in 1898. It is made of planished solid silver and weighs 10 kilos. The lot is 58 centimetres wide (81 with the handles) and 57 centimetres high. Placed on an ebony plinth, it is considered as a masterpiece of Art nouveau style.

=== The first Godinet rule One Ton Cups ===
Scotia 1, challenger of the 1900 One Ton Cup, designed by Linton Hope, beaten by defender Sidi-Fekkar of Eugène Laverne.

These one-tonners are dinghies measuring up to 7 metres, capable of planing in certain conditions and built with a scantling as light as possible, the balance being ensured by the crew. These yachts were also present at the 1900 Olympic Games, in the 0.5 to 1 tonner class.

The first Cup took place from 2 May 1899 in Meulan. The English competitor Vectis was beaten by the French yacht Bélouga steered by Eugène Laverne during the three timed rounds. Bélouga had the advantage of knowing the river and had been capped among nine French one-tonners specifically built for this event. In 1900, Scotia 1, designed by Linton Hope faced Sidi-Fekkar steered and designed by Eugène Laverne. Sidi-Fekkar won the Cup at the end of the decisive fifth round. But Scotia won the gold medal at the Olympics.

Scotia 2 from the Sea View Yacht-Club won the Cup in England in 1901. One of the reasons of the French failure was the switch in 1901 from the 1892 rule to the Méran formula; the one-tonner Sidi-Fekkar weighed close to two tons according to this 1901 rule and had to be changed3. Sequana, the defender yacht chosen by the CVP in 1901, steered by Eugène Laverne was beaten, as well as the Italian yacht Dai-Dai. In 1902, Scotia III won in three rounds against August steered by Valton, member of the CVP, still for the SVYC. France won the Cup back in 1903 with Chocolat, Auguste Godinet’s plan, at the origin of the 1892 rule. Valton, Méran and Arthus won against the defender Iris. In 1906, after two years without challenge, the last Cup played on a French rule one-tonner was won by Feu Follet with Louis Potheau of the CVP in front of N.R.V. from Hamburg.

=== The era of international 6 Metre ===
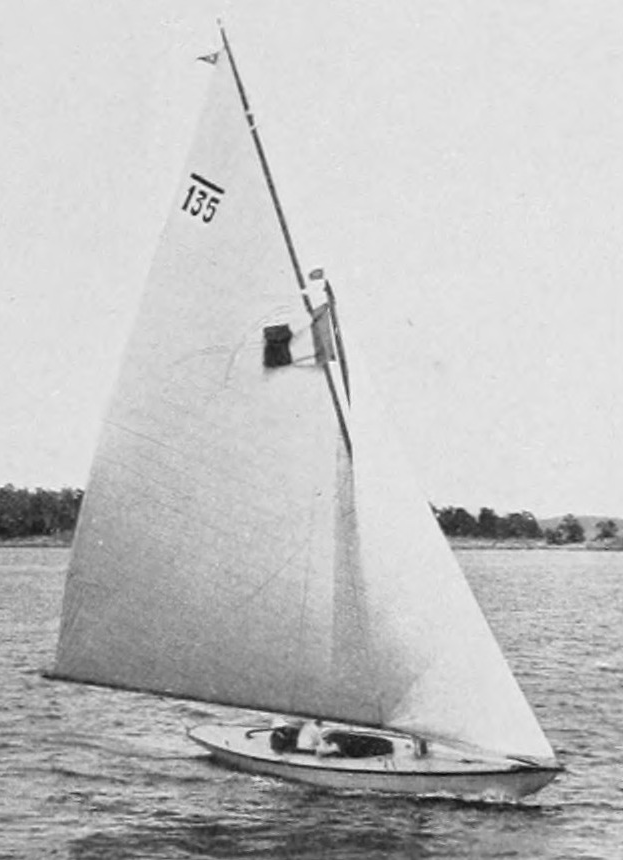
6 Metre Mac Miche, gold medal at the 1912 Olympics

From 1907 the CVP decided to have this One Ton Cup contested in international 6-metre yachts, a brand-new rule ratified by the representatives of the European Nautical Authorities during the London congress in 1906. They were not 6 to 7-metre dinghies anymore but keelboats of about eleven metres hull length that confronted each other during regattas that continued to bear the name of one-tonners cup or One Ton Cup. Onkel Adolf for Germany won the first Cup on 6 Metre in 1907.

In 1913, the 6 Metre Cremona of the Royal Thames Yacht Club won the last Cup before the First World War. After an interlude of four Cups contested in 6.5m SI, the CVP decided in 1923 to come back to international 6 Metre, at the British challengers’ request5.

=== The era of 6.50mSI ===
1907 rule 6.50m, in the style of 6.50m that raced the One Ton Cup from 1920 to 1923.

From 1920 to 1923 four cups were contested in 6.5m SI at the CVP’s request. The 6.50m of the French rule known as « Chemin de fer » rule, adopted in Continental Europe since the yachts could be carried on standard flat wagons, favoured the number of challengers. The English defender 6.50m Cordella won the Cup four times. It was a plan by Morgan Giles that was opposed among others to Oranje, gold medal for the Netherlands in 6.50m at the 1920 Olympics.

=== The era of the ocean race and One-tonner ===
The 6 Metre series, back in 1924, was in decline after 1945. At the beginning of the 1960s, Jean Peytel, member of the Cercle de la voile de Paris suggested to revive the CVP International Cup in RORC rule 22 feet maximum yacht. The boats were baptized as the One Ton class. Yachting World magazine documented the excitement this caused amongst sailors: "Seldom can a trophy have created so much interest before a single race has been sailed" in January 1965, and in September of that year the magazine wrote that "Handicaps are out and the popularity of the series has exceeded all expectations, even in this its first year."

The first One Ton Cup in racing-cruising yachts was raced off Le Havre in 1965 by fourteen yachts. The winner was the Danish yacht Diana III. The real-time racing formula, including a race on the open sea and two coastal regattas, was so successful that yachts were specifically designed for that event. They were named the One-tonners although this designation did not correspond any longer to any rule of that period.

In 1971 the IOR rule (International Offshore Rule), result of the merger between the RORC rule and the CCA (Cruising Club of America) American rule, came into force for the races on the open sea9,6. The One-Tonners switched to IOR 27.5 feet. Syd Fischer skipper of Stormy Petrel won the 1971 One Ton Cup in New Zealand (the first race under the IOR rules), being the only Australian yacht and last Sparkman & Stephens design to win the cup.

In November 1983 the ORC (Offshore Racing Council, renamed Offshore Racing Congress in 2005) decided to bring the IOR rule of the One-Tonners up to 30.5, the smallest size for yachts accepted for the Admiral's Cup. The first One Ton Cup with that rule was contested by 24 yachts in 1984. Philippe Briand, architect and skipper of Passion 2 won in La Rochelle11, France.

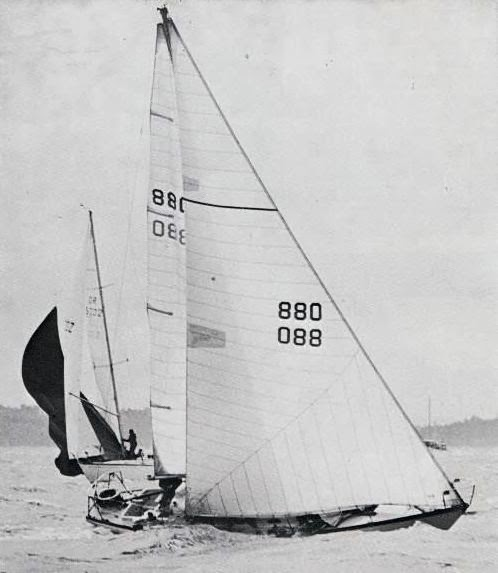
1971 the IOR rule style that raced the One Ton Cup. World Champion Stormy Petrel

In 1999 the world championship of the Corel 45 series (IC 45, Farr 45) was attributed to the One Ton Cup. The first Cup was won by Bertrand Pacé.

== Winners ==
Edition	Yacht	Class	Skipper	Designer
1899 Meulan	Bélouga (FRA)	1-tonner Godinet Rule	Eugène Laverne	Alphonse Tellier
1900 Meulan	Sidi-Fekkar (FRA)	1-tonner Godinet Rule	Eugène Laverne	Eugène Laverne
1901 Meulan	Scotia 2 (GBR)	1-tonner Méran Rule	Sea View YC	Linton Hope
1902 Cowes	Scotia III (GBR)	1-tonner Méran Rule	Sea View YC	Linton Hope
1903 Cowes	Chocolat (FRA)	1-tonner Méran Rule	Valton	Auguste Godinet
1906 Meulan	Feu Follet (FRA)	1-tonner Méran Rule	Louis Potheau	Pierre Arbaut
1907 Meulan	Onkel Adolf (GER)	6 Metre	Fritz Kirsten	Wilhelm von Hacht
1908 Kiel	Windspiel XI (GER)	6 Metre	Fritz Kirsten	Wilhelm von Hacht
1909 Kiel	Windspiel XI (GER)	6 Metre	Fritz Kirsten	Wilhelm von Hacht
1910 Kiel	Agnes II (SWE)	6 Metre		C.O. Liljegren
1911 Gothenburg	Windspiel XIV (GER)	6 Metre	Fritz Kirsten	Wilhelm von Hacht
1912 Kiel	Bunty (GBR)	6 Metre	E.G. Martin	G.U. Laws
1913 Cowes	Cremona (GBR)	6 Metre	RTYC	Morgan Giles
1920 Cowes	Cordella (GBR)	6.5m SI		Morgan Giles
1921 Ryde	Cordella (GBR)	6.5m SI		Morgan Giles
1922 Ryde	Cordella (GBR)	6.5m SI	Morgan Giles	Morgan Giles
1923 Ryde	Cordella (GBR)	6.5m SI		Morgan Giles
1924 Ryde	Holland's Hope (NLD)	6 Metre		G. de Vries
1925 Zuyderzee	Princes Juliana (NLD)	6 Metre		G. de Vries
1926 Zuyderzee	Zenith (GBR)	6 Metre	J. Lauriston	William Fife
1927 Ryde	Petite Aile II (FRA)	6 Metre	Virginie Hériot	Pierre Arbaut
1928 Meulan	Yara III (FRA)	6 Metre	M. Conill	Joseph Guédon
1929 Deauville	Bissbi II (SWE)	6 Metre	S. Salen	Tore Holm
1930 Sandhamn	Bissbi II (SWE)	6 Metre	S. Salen	Tore Holm
1931 Sandhamn	Bissbi IV (SWE)	6 Metre	Tore Holm	Tore Holm
1932 Sandhamn	Abu (NOR)	6 Metre	Magnus Konow	Johan Anker
1933 Hanko	Varg V (NOR)	6 Metre	Magnus Konow	Bjarne Aas
1934 Hanko	White Lady (NOR)	6 Metre	Magnus Konow	Bjarne Aas
1935 Hanko	Ian III (SWE)	6 Metre	B. Gedda	Tore Holm
1936 Gothenburg	Tidsfördrif (SWE)	6 Metre	Tore Holm	Tore Holm
1937 Marstrand	Tidsfördrif II (SWE)	6 Metre	A. Schulz	Tore Holm
1938 Gothenburg	Norna VI (N65) (NOR)	6 Metre	Olav V de Norvège ?	Johan Anker
1939 Hanko	Noreg III (NOR)	6 Metre	Rolf Svinndal	Johan Anker
1946 Hanko	May Be VI (SWE)	6 Metre	S. Salen	Tore Holm
1947 Sandhamn	May Be VI (SWE)	6 Metre	Claës-Henrik Nordenskiöld	Tore Holm
1948 Marstrand	May Be VI (SWE)	6 Metre	S. Salen	Tore Holm
1949 Sandhamn	Trickson VI (SWE)	6 Metre	A. Laurin	A. Laurin
1950 Sandhamn	May Be VI (SWE)	6 Metre	S. Salen	Tore Holm
1951	Llanoria VI (USA)	6 Metre	Eric Ridder, Herman Whiton	Sparkman & Stephens
1953 Newport	Ylliam VIII (SWE)	6 Metre	Louis Noverraz	B. Aas
1954 Genève	Ylliam IX (CHE)	6 Metre	Louis Noverraz	Sparkman & Stephens
1955 Stockholm	Ylliam IX (CHE)	6 Metre	Louis Noverraz	Sparkman & Stephens
1956 Cannes	Ylliam IX (CHE)	6 Metre	Louis Noverraz	Sparkman & Stephens
1957 Hanko	Llanoria (NOR)	6 Metre	Magnus Konow	Sparkman & Stephens
1958 Le Havre	Royal Thames (GBR)	6 Metre	R.S.G. Perry	David Boyd
1959 Poole	May Be VIII (SWE)	6 Metre	Claës-Henrik Nordenskiöld	Tore Holm
1960 Gothenburg	Elghi III (FRA)	6 Metre	Robert Meunier du Houssoy	Tore Holm
1961 Cannes	Elghi III (FRA)	6 Metre	robert Meunier du Houssoy	Tore Holm
1962 Palma (Majorca)	Elghi III (FRA)	6 Metre	Robert Meunier du Houssoy	Tore Holm
1965 Le Havre	Diana III (DEN)	22 ft. RORC Rating	Hans Albrecht	Sparkman & Stephens
1966 Copenhagen	Tina (USA)	22 ft. RORC Rating	Dick Carter	Dick Carter
1967 Le Havre	Optimist (FRG)	22 ft. RORC Rating	Hans Beilken	Dick Carter
1968 Heligoland	Optimist (FRG)	22 ft. RORC Rating	Hans Beilken	Dick Carter
1969 Heligoland	Rainbow II (NZL)	22 ft. RORC Rating	Chris Bouzaid	Sparkman & Stephens
1971 Auckland	Stormy Petrel (AUS)	27,5 ft. IOR Rating	Syd Fischer	Sparkman & Stephens
1972 Sydney	Wai Aniwa (NZL)	27,5 ft. IOR Rating	Chris Bouzaid	Dick Carter
1973 Porto Cervo	Ydra (ITA)	27,5 ft. IOR Rating	Agostino Straulino	Dick Carter
1974 Torquay	Gumboots (GBR)	27,5 ft. IOR Rating	Jeremy Rogers	Doug Peterson
1975 Newport	Pied Piper (USA)	27,5 ft. IOR Rating	Jennings	Doug Peterson
1976 Marseille	Resolute Salmon (USA)	27,5 ft. IOR Rating	Carlo Scognamiglio Pasini	Britton Chance Jr.
1977 Auckland	Red Lion (NZL)	27,5 ft. IOR Rating	Stuart Brentnall	Bruce Farr
1978 Flensburg	Tilsalg (FRG)	27,5 ft. IOR Rating	Klaus Lange	Ron Holland
1979 Newport	Pendragon (USA)	27,5 ft. IOR Rating	John MacLaurin	Laurie Davidson
1980 Naples	Filo da Torcere (ITA)	27,5 ft. IOR Rating	Enrico Isenburg, Stefano Roberti	Studio Andrea Vallicelli & C.
1981 Crosshaven	Justine III (IRL)	27,5 ft. IOR Rating	Harold Cudmore	Tony Castro
1982 Brighton	cancelled			
1983 Rio de Janeiro	Linda (ITA)	27,5 ft. IOR Rating	Mauro Pelaschier	Sciomachen
1984 La Trinité-sur-Mer	Passion (FRA)	30,5 ft. IOR Rating	Philippe Briand	Philippe Briand
1985 Poole	Jade (GBR)	30,5 ft. IOR Rating	Rodney Pattisson	Rob Humphreys
1986 Palma de Majorca	Andelsbanken (DEN)	30,5 ft. IOR Rating	Henrik Søderlund	Niels Jeppesen
1987 Kiel	Fram X (NOR)	30,5 ft. IOR Rating	King Harald V of Norway	Bruce Farr
1988 San Francisco	Propaganda (NZL)	30,5 ft. IOR Rating	Richard Dodson	Bruce Farr
1989 Naples	Brava (ITA)	30,5 ft. IOR Rating	Francesco de Angelis, Paul Cayard	Bruce Farr
1990 Marstrand	Okyalos (GRE)	30,5 ft. IOR Rating	Yiannis Kostopoulos/George Ertsos	Niels Jeppesen
1991 Nieuwpoort	Vibes (USA)	30,5 ft. IOR Rating	David H. Clarke	Bruce Farr
1992 Skovshoved	Brava Q8 (ITA)	30,5 ft. IOR Rating	Francesco de Angelis	Bruce Farr
1993 Cagliari	Pinta (GER)	30,5 ft. IOR Rating	Willi Illbruck, Russell Coutts	Judel-Vrolijk
1994 Marseille	Pinta (GER)	30,5 ft. IOR Rating	Willi Illbruck, John Kostecki	Judel-Vrolijk
1999 Puerto Portals	K Yote (FRA)	IC 45	Ortwin Kandler, Bertrand Pacé	Bruce Farr
2000 Marseille	Cavale Bleu (FRA)	IC 45	Michel Duquenne, Thierry Peponnet	Bruce Farr
2001 Pwhelli	Atalanti (GRE)	IC 45	Georges Andreadis	Bruce Farr
2002 Saint-Tropez	Faster K-Yote (FRA)	IC 45	Dawn Riley, Alain Fedensieu	Bruce Farr
2016 Cowes	Girls on Film (GBR)	Fast 40+	Peter Morton	Shawn Carkeek
2017 Cowes	Girls on Film (GBR)	Fast 40+	Peter Morton	Shawn Carkeek
2018 Cowes	Rán (SWE)	Fast 40+	Niklas Zennstrom	Shawn Carkeek

== See also ==
- Half Ton Cup
- Quarter Ton Cup
