= Laurie Davidson (yacht designer) =

New Zealand yacht designer (1926–2021)

Lawrence Karl Davidson CNZM (12 December 1926 – 4 October 2021) was a New Zealand sailing yacht designer. He is most notable for his International America's Cup Class sailboats which successfully challenged and defended the America's Cup sailing trophy.

In the 2000 New Year Honours, Davidson was appointed a Companion of the New Zealand Order of Merit, for services to yacht designing.

He was inducted into the America's Cup Hall of Fame in 2007.

== Early career ==
Davidson was born on 12 December 1926. After leaving school he qualified as an accountant and worked in that profession until in 1969 he joined Morley Sutherland's boat building company at Greenhithe. In 1970 Tony Bouzaid commissioned the Blitzkrieg a half-ton yacht designed by Davidson. Davidson captained it to win the inaugural New Zealand Half Ton Championship. Encouraged by this success Davidson bought an Olivetti computer and with software sourced from Sparkman & Stephens began using the computer to design yachts. He was subsequently the first New Zealand yacht designer to hold the IOR rule on computer.

in 1976 Davidson designed Fun, a trailerable Quarter Ton yacht.

== IOR success ==
In 1976 Davidson designed Waverider for Tony Bouzaid, which won the 1978 Half Ton Cup held at Poole, England. In reaction to the success of the light displacement yachts designed by Davidson, Bruce Farr and Paul Whiting, the IOR brought in new rules which required extensive surgery of Waverider to bring her into class for the 1979 Half Ton Cup series, which Waverider won, becoming the first yacht to ever win the Half Ton Cup twice.

After the success of Waverider, John MacLaurin commissioned Pendragon a Three-Quarter-tonner development of and big sister to Waverider. Built lightly in wood by Ocean Racing Yachts in Auckland, Pendragon won the Three-Quarter Ton cup held in 1978 in Vancouver, British Columbia. In the following year it won the One Ton Cup held at Newport, Rhode Island, a feat which was not achieved by any other yacht in level rating competition.

Among his other designs have been the M20 fibreglass trailer yacht (1973), the Davidson 28, the Davidson 31 (1974), the Dash 34 (1981), the Davidson 35 (1981), the Davidson 40, the Cavalier 37, the Cavalier 45 production yachts. The only Davidson yacht in production is the Davidson 29, designed in 1990. Two boats racing and cruising are home ported in Seattle Washington, and Vancouver B.C.. Custom production at Center of Effort, sailboat shop, Port Townsend, Washington.

Davidson designed Outward Bound for Digby Taylor which competed in the 1981-82 Whitbread Round the World race, and won the small boat honours.

== Death ==
Davidson died in Auckland, aged 94, on 4 October 2021.

== America's Cup ==
- 1995, San Diego – Designed NZL 32 which won the America's Cup in five straight races
- 2000, Auckland – Chief designer for Team New Zealand, and again won in five straight races (against challenger Luna Rossa)
- 2003, Auckland – Designer for OneWorld Challenge who made it as far as the semi-final repechage.
