= Jan Kjærulff =

Danish sailor

Personal information
- Nationality: Danish
- Born: 30 December 1943 Maglegård, Denmark
- Died: 25 August 2006 (aged 62)
- Height: 186 cm (6 ft 1 in)
- Weight: 78 kg (172 lb)

Sailing career
- Sport: Sailing
- Club: Royal Danish Yacht Club
- Class: Soling

Jan Kjærulff (30 December 1943 – 25 August 2006) was a sailor from Denmark. He was born in Maglegård. Kjærulff represented his country at the 1972 Summer Olympics in Kiel. Kjærulff took 13th place in the Soling with Paul Elvstrøm as helmsman and Valdemar Bandolowski as fellow crew member. Kjærulff died in August 2006. With Paul Elvstrøm he formed Elvstrøm & Kjærulff Yacht Design, and Kjærulff is credited with the design of many yachts.

== See also ==
- Elvstrøm 717
