= Elvstrøm Sails =

Danish sailmaker

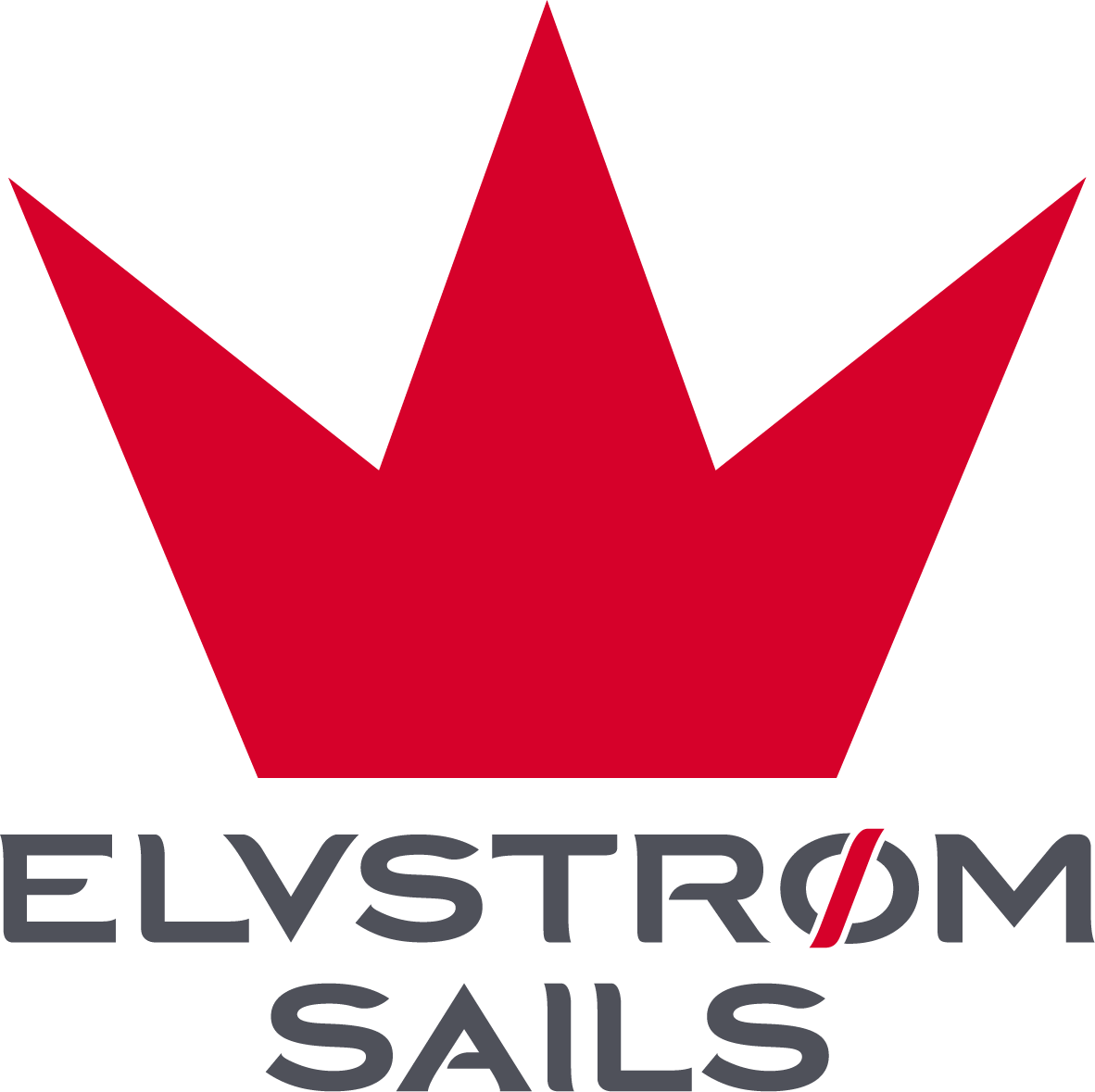
The Elvstrøm Sails logo of today.

Elvstrøm Sails is an international sailmaker. Elvstrøm Sails was founded by Paul Elvstrøm, who founded the company based on his inventions for dinghy racing through the 1940s and 1950s.

In 1954, Elvstrøm Dinghy Sails was founded, and in term, this is the company that became Elvstrøm Sails in its current shape.

Today, Elvstrøm Sails is a leading sail manufacturer, designing, engineering, and producing sails for sailboats—for racing and cruising purposes.

The company is based in Aabenraa, Denmark and holds subsidiaries in France and the UK.

== History ==
Off the back of winning two back-to-back Olympic Gold Medals in 1948 and 1952, Paul Elvstrøm founded Elvstrøm Dinghy Sails in the basement of his family home in Northern Copenhagen in 1954.

Elvstrøm only had one sewing machine, and for the first many years, production was focused on products for dinghy racing – and especially the Finn, in which Elvstrøm enjoyed much success, winning three Olympic golds on the trot in 1952, 1956 and 1960.

Elvstrøm Dinghy Sails was founded in 1954, but production started in 1953 when Paul Elvstrøm gathered permission to borrow the facilities of a local sailmaker's shop to try making a sail.

He was confident in the shape of the sail but knew nothing about sailcloth. He did, however, pick the proper cloth, and the first sail, aimed at the Pirate Dinghy, was much better than he had hoped. This was also the point where he introduced his friend from primary school, Eric "Strit" Johansen, to the trade. "Strit" worked in clothes manufacturing, and the duo set about converting a sewing machine for sailmaking and inventing a number of other tools for the then very new production of sails in the basement under Elvstrøm's house in Hellerup.

Elvstrøm's successes in the Finn led to a vast number of inventions driven by his passion for optimization. All of them were aimed at dinghy racing as he came up with ideas such as the automatic bailer, the floating vest and more. The automatic bailer was a silent revolution in the world of Dinghy Racing. Elvstrøm was not the first to have the idea of a built-in bailer, as other manufacturers debuted a semi-automatic solution at the Finn Gold Cup in 1956.

The semi-automatic bailer was a major step forward, but it was not flawless. It was prone to breaking, and it would allow water to run in when the dinghy was not at a race pace. Elvstrøm went straight to the drawing board and started perfecting the idea. Over the following years, the automatic bailer from Elvstrøm became an essential accessory for dinghies and keelboats alike.

Paul Elvstrøm's new career as a sailmaker also took shape quickly and quickly replaced his original position as a building contractor. The initial hit was dinghy sails for the Finn Class, but it soon dawned on the duo that their solutions worked wonders for the Pirate and the Snipe classes, too.

This was in 1954, the same year Elvstrøm revised the basement of his house and made it into a small factory. Two years later, Elvstrøm and Strit Johansen branched out and made the first connection to France, which has since played a vital part in the history of Elvstrøm Sails.

They became partners in the new Elvström Sails Cannes thanks to a new partnership with Albert Desbarges, who owned a small loft in Cannes. Desbarges partnered up with "Strit" Johansen and their mutual friend, Pierre Poullain, to start the new venture.

Elvstrøm Dinghy Sails in Denmark then moved with Paul Elvstrøm to his new villa in Rungsted to accommodate the growing business. In 1968 they then made the move to a brand-new facility in Kokkedal.

=== Transformation ===
In 1976, Paul Elvstrøm sold his majority stake in Elvstrøm Sails to focus on designing and producing boats in the new company, Elvstrøm/Kjærulff Yachtdesign.

Elvstrøm Sails was handed over to Hans Fogh and Henning Olsen, who made the decision to establish a new facility in Aabenraa, first named Fogh-Sails Europe A/S. Later, in 1979, Olsen bought the rest of Elvstrøm Sails in Hørsholm and transferred Fogh Sails into Elvstrøm Sails, now based in Aabenraa. While Hans Fogh withdrew, Paul Elvstrøm stayed on board as a designer and consultant.

Henning Olsen died the year after, in 1980, and his son Claus Olsen took over the loft in Aabenraa. Claus Olsen intensified the development of sails and the marketing side of Elvstrøm Sails, and the company started its growth towards what it is today. Today, Elvstrøm Sails is the supplier of sails for many of the top European OEMs in keelboats, catamarans, and trimarans alike.

In 2017, Elvstrøm Sails A/S bought all activities in its French sister company, which united Elvstrøm Sails to become the then-second largest sailmaker in the world.

== Crown logo ==
Elvstrøm Sails is a brand that is known worldwide. The red crown was the logo Paul Elvstrøm designed for his company, and to this day, the red crown lives on. There have been various iterations of the logo around the crown over the years – but the crown stayed the way the founder intended. A giant mosaic of the Elvstrøm Crown is also the centerpiece of the plaza in front of where it all began – Hellerup Sejlklub in northern Copenhagen. The plaza was renamed Paul Elvstrøms Plads in 2017 following the death of Paul Elvstrøm in December 2016.

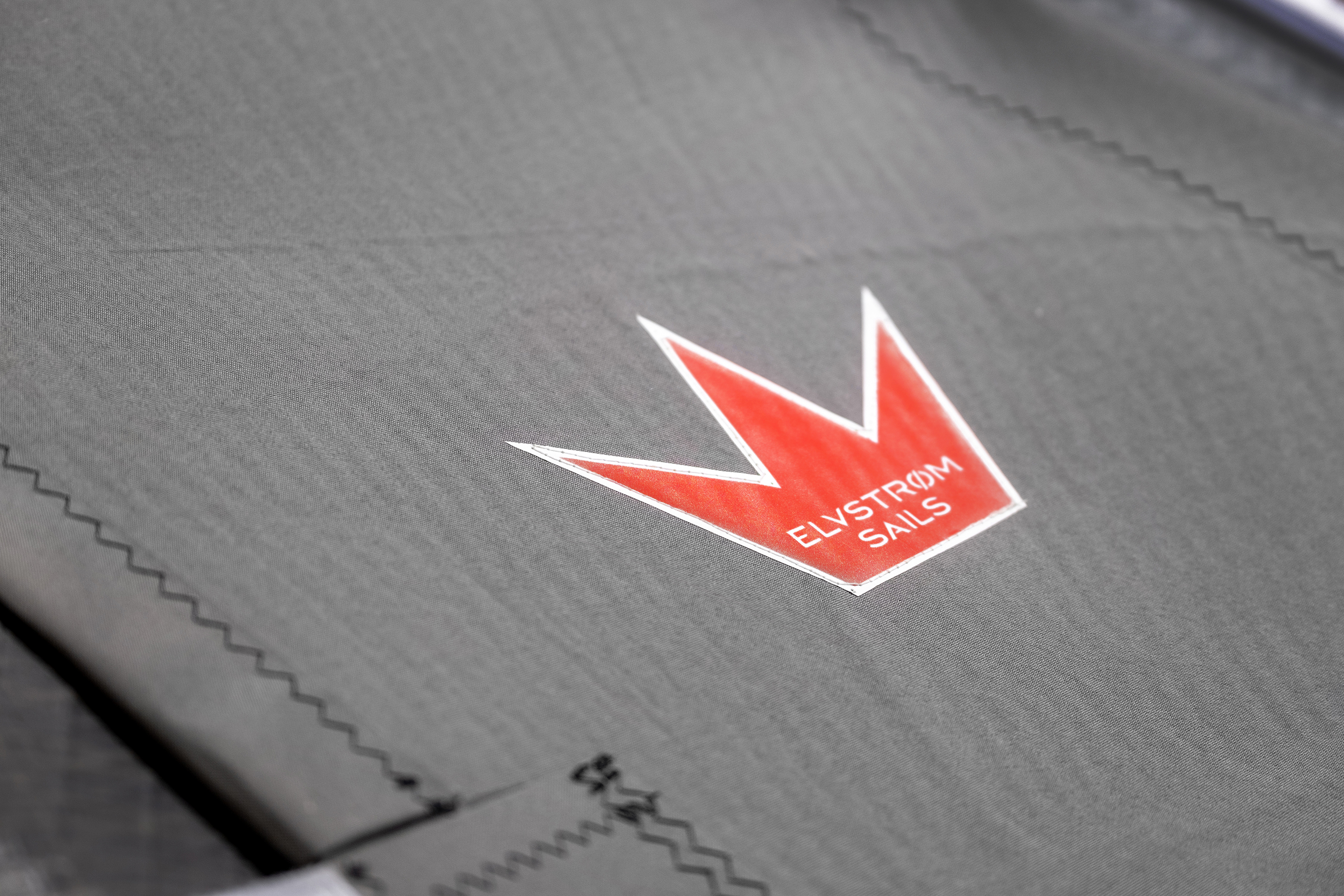
The Elvstrøm Sails crown in use today.

== Technology ==
EPEX is the current technology in membrane sails from Elvstrøm Sails. The first step towards the current EPEX technology came in 2002 when Elvstrøm Sails acquired the American company Sobstad and their Genesis technology. Sobstad Genesis was the first generation of the laminate technology which since has shaped Elvstrøm Sails.

The EPEX name is made up of two words – epochal and apex. The EPEX name combines the two.

Another current technology at Elvstrøm Sails is the use of recycled materials, labelled the EKKO option.
