= Elliott W. Wislar =

American sailor

Elliott W. Wislar is an American sailor. Wislar won two world championships in the International One Design yacht race in 2011 and 2010. Wislar is currently CEO of Clearbrook Financial.

== Family ==
Wislar is a descendant of the Wakefield family, who originate from Martha's Vineyard during the 1680s. His mother's ancestors (the Elliott's) raised sheep, and later became wine makers in the Napa Valley region (California). Elliott's father was a Wall Street Insurance executive that later became an investor in private equities, and his mother was a Standford graduate, and worked at the New Yorker Magazine. Elliott's grandfather was a successful “wildcatter”.
