= Quarter Ton Cup =

Sailing trophy

The Quarter Ton Cup is a sailing trophy awarded to the winners of the world Quarter Ton class championships between 1968 and 1997 and for the Quarter Ton Classic Revival from 2005 to present. The class fleet still sails on the Solent.

== Quarter Ton Cup / World Championship - 1968 - 1997 ==
Year	Location Nation	Host club	Winning boat Designer	Crew	Note	Ref.
1967	La Rochelle; France		Defender (B)			
1972	La Rochelle; France		Petite Fleur (F)	Paul Elvstrøm (DEN) +Others		
1980	Panmure; France		Bullit (F); Jacques Fauroux (Bullit)			
1981	Marseille; France		Lacydon Protis (F); Jacques Fauroux (Bullit)	Paul Elvstrom (DEN) +Others		

== Modern Quarter Ton Cup ==
Under a different set of rules existing half ton boats were extensively modified to race under the IRC rating system but no longer as an international class with primary focus around the Solent in United Kingdom.

Year	Location	Winning boat	Designer	Crew	Note	Ref.
2005	Cowes (GBR); Royal Corinthian Yacht Club	Purple Haze (GBR)	David Thomas	Tony Dodd, Jim Webb, George Webb, Tim Reese, Derek Morland		
2006	Cowes (GBR); Royal Corinthian Yacht Club	Enigma (GBR)	Ed Dubois	Andy Beadsworth; Ed Dubois; Neil Mackley, Anthony Haines; Michael Boniface		
2007	Cowes (GBR); Royal Corinthian Yacht Club	Espada (GBR)	Bruce Farr	Peter Morton		
2008	Cowes (GBR); Royal Corinthian Yacht Club	Tom Bombadil (GBR)	Doug Peterson	Chris Frost; Kevin George; Dave Lenz, Jo Chatterton; Shredder		
2009	Cowes	Anchor Challenge (GBR)	Bruce Farr	Peter Morton		
2010	Cowes	Cote (ESP)	Pepe Gonzalez	Darren Marston; Olly Ophaus; Rob Dyer, Dave Lenz; Chris Cooper		
2011	Cowes	Espada (GBR)	Bruce Farr	Louise Morton		
2012	Cowes	Bullit (GBR)	J Fauroux	Peter Morton		
2013	Cowes	Espada (GBR)	Bruce Farr	Louise Morton		
2014	Cowes	Bullit (GBR)	J Fauroux	Peter Morton		
2015	Cowes	Bullit (GBR)	J Fauroux	Louise Morton		
2016	Cowes	Bullit (GBR)	J Fauroux	Louise Morton		
2017	Cowes	Aguila (GBR)	Judel Vrolijk	Sam Laidlaw		
2018	Cowes	Aguila (GBR)	Judel Vrolijk	Sam Laidlaw		
2019	Cowes	Protis (GBR)	J Fauroux	Ian Southworth, Led Pritchard, Lincoln Redding, John Santy, Mike Stannard		
2020	Cowes					
2021	Cowes (GBR)	Protis (GBR)	J Fauroux			
2022	Cowes (GBR); Royal Yacht Squadron					
2023	Cork (IRL); Royal Cork Yacht Club					

== See also ==
- Half Ton Cup
- One Ton Cup
