= Laurie Davidson =

Laurie Davidson may refer to:

- Laurie Davidson (yacht designer) (1927–2021), New Zealand yacht designer
- Laurie Davidson (actor) (born 1992), British actor
