= Elvstrøm 717 =

Development
- Designer: Paul Elvstrøm & Jan Kjærulff
- Year: 1976
- Builder: Nordship

Boat
- Draft: 1.25 m (4.1 ft)

Hull
- LOA: 7.25 m (23.8 ft)
- LWL: 6.70 m (22.0 ft)
- Beam: 3.23 m (10.6 ft)

Elvstrøm 717 is a 7.25-metre (23.8 ft) sailboat class designed by Paul Elvstrøm and Jan Kjærulff and built in more than 50 copies.

== History ==
The Elvstrøm 717 designed by Paul Elvstrøm and Jan Kjærulff was built by Nordship between 1976 and 1980.
