= Biskop Hvoslef =

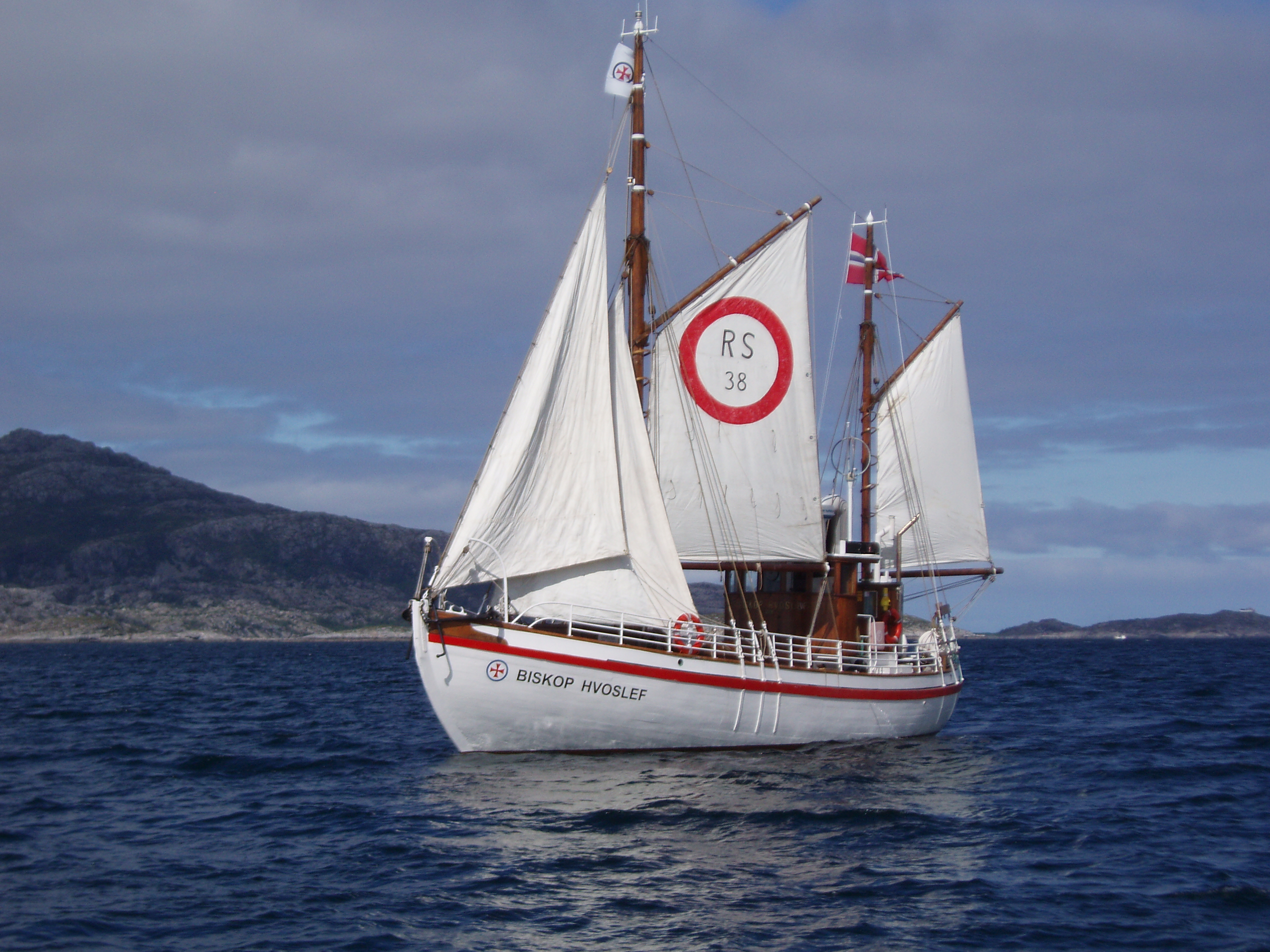
- RS 38 Biskop Hvoslef

History

Norway
- Name: Biskop Hvoslef
- Namesake: Waldemar Hvoslef
- Operator: Redningsselskapet
- Launched: 1933
- In service: 1933
- Out of service: 1969
- Status: Privately owned

General characteristics
- Type: lifeboat

The Biskop Hvoslef is a veteran Norwegian sailing vessel. The vessel was named after Bishop Waldemar Hvoslef (1825-1906). Bjarne Aas designed the vessel which was his first rescue boat. The ship was built for the rescue company of Br. Fallfall in Hardanger and put into service in 1933. The ship was utilized as a search and rescue by the Redningsselskapet (Norwegian Society for Rescue at Sea) on the Norwegian coast between 1933 and 1969. It is now a privately owned vessel. In 1992, "Biskop Hvoslef" was bought by the Balsfjord village museum. Later, the retired lifeboat was taken over by a foundation. From 1992, the skate was also on the National Antiquities' list of vessels worthy of preservation, but the conservation status was revoked when the skate changed owners in 2013. It is 16.85 meters long and has a deck width of 5.24 meters.
