= Bjarne Aas =

Norwegian ship builder (1886–1969)

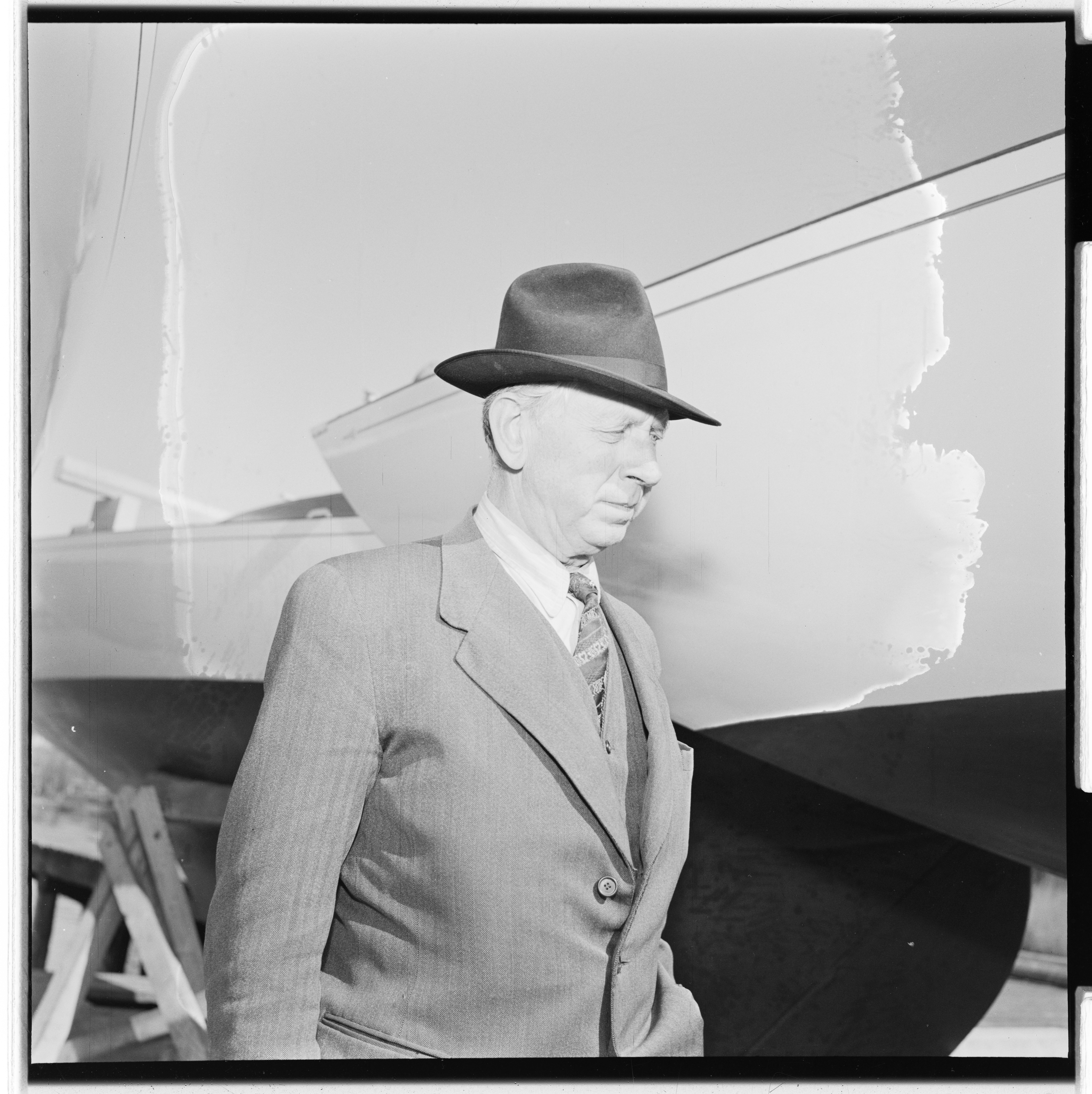
- Born: 28 February 1886; Kristiania, Norway
- Died: 29 March 1969 (aged 83)
- Education: Karljohansvern
- Occupations: Engineer, sailor, yacht designer and ship builder
- Known for: International One Design
- Notable work: Biskop Hvoslef
- Awards: Order of St. Olav (1957)

Bjarne Aas (28 February 1886 – 29 March 1969) was a Norwegian engineer, sailor, yacht designer and ship builder.

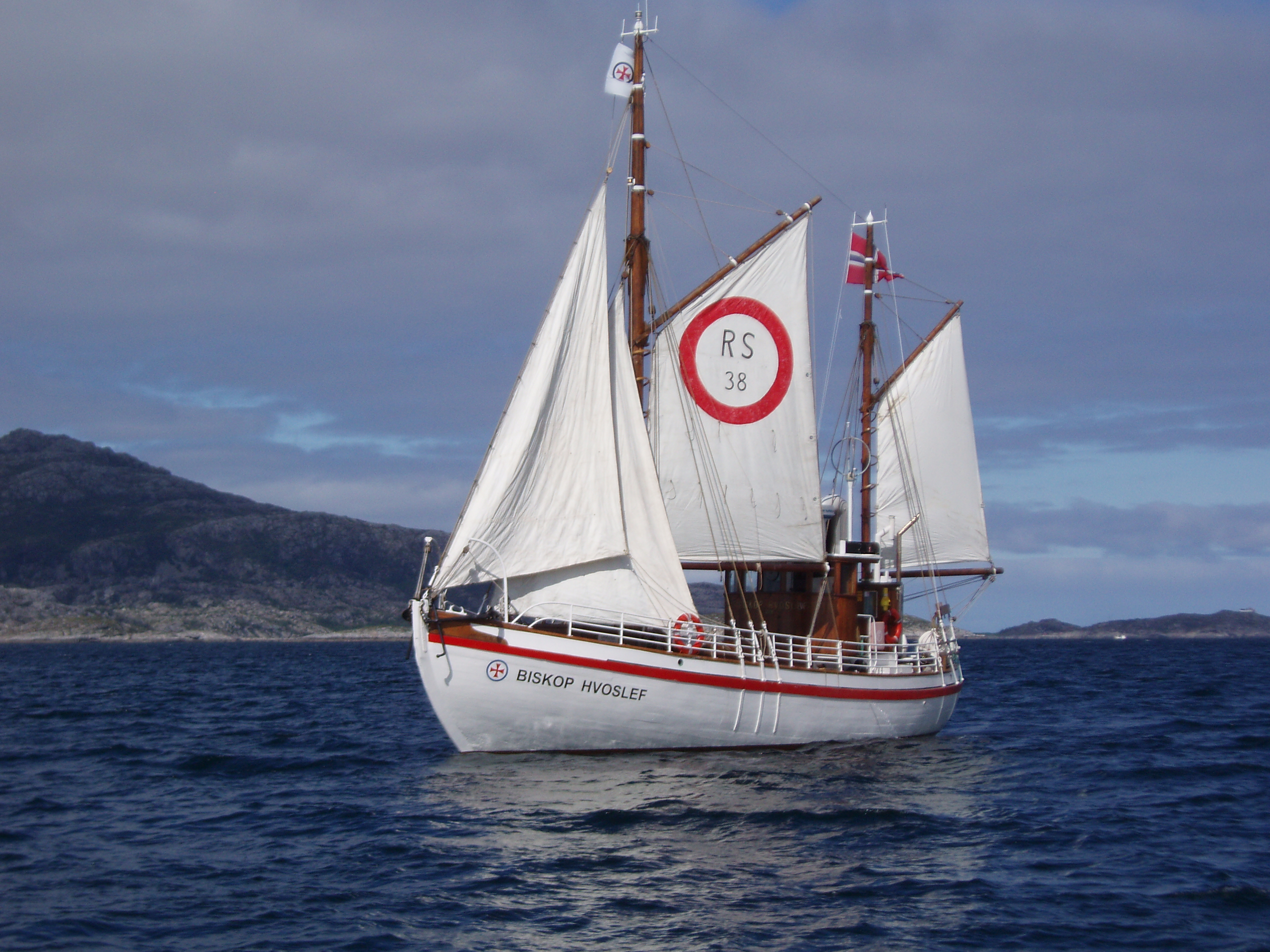
Biskop Hvoslef

== Biography ==
Aas was born in Kristiania (now Oslo), Norway. He was a son of Henrik Ernst Aas and Anette Sofie Sørensen. He studied ship construction at the Karljohansvern technical college (Karljohansverns tekniske skole) in Horten. After graduation, he worked as a boat designer in Fredrikstad, later in Bergen and Tønsberg. In 1916, he founded Norsk Gearfabrikk AS on Isegran in Fredrikstad.

He was decorated Knight, First Class of the Order of St. Olav in 1957.

== Designs ==
In total, he designed approx. 615 boats. His breakthrough as yacht designer came in 1924, when his 6mR yacht Elisabeth V won a gold medal at the 1924 Summer Olympics. In 1932, Aas designed Biskop Hvoslef which was his first rescue boat. He went on to design a total of 14 rescue boats. He was also known for the design of a number of other 6mR yachts. Among his best known designs is the International One Design.
