= Pirate (dinghy) =

Type of German sailing dinghy

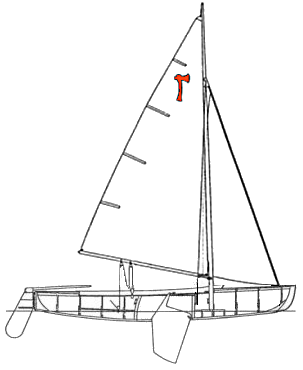

Boat
- Crew: 2

Hull
- Hull weight: 218 kg
- LOA: 5 m (16 ft)

Rig
- Mast height: 6.29 m (20.6 ft)

Sails
- Spinnaker area: 10 m^{2}
- Upwind sail area: 10 m^{2}

A Pirate is a type of German sailing dinghy. It was first constructed in 1935, and has no trapeze. The Pirate was designed in 1934 by the German boat builder Carl Martens. The boat was originally manufactured in solid wood, although since the 1960s glass-reinforced plastic, or a sandwich of the two, is also used. According to the regulations for this class of boat, kevlar and carbon fiber are forbidden.

The Pirate is a youth dinghy. It was formerly the only class used in German youth sailing championships. At present, the Pirate class is only registered in Germany. With more than 380 participants in the official rank list, it is one of the most active race classes in Germany. The Pirate is sailed by a two-person crew, and measures 5.0 metres (16.4 ft) long by 1.6 metres (5.2 ft) across.

The maximum sail surface, comprising two sails, amounts to 10 m^{2} according to the class regulations. Since the 1960s, spinnakers up to 10 m^{2} are also permitted. The use of a Genoa or Gennaker is not permitted. The sails can be manufactured from cotton, linen or synthetic fabrics. Carbon fiber in the sails is forbidden, and may be used only as reinforcement in the windows of the sail.

The Piraatjol, a dinghy of the same name albeit in Dutch, was designed in the 1950s by Dutch naval architect Jaap Kraaier.
