= Half Ton Cup =

Sailing competition between 1967 and 1993

- First held: 1967
- Last held: 1993
- Champions: Atlanti

Half Ton Cup was an international sailing competition for the Half Ton class between 1967 and 1993.

== Criteria ==
- Note 1. Boats can be either prototype or production models.
- Note 2. Often once a boat won the Half Ton Cup, the design was subsequently put into mass production. (Such as the Rob Humphries MGHS30 which was put into production in Scotland. A much modified example of the MGHS30 won the Half Ton Classics Cup 2013 which operates under the IRC handicap system.)
- Note 3. All boats race under the IOR handicap system without further handicap.

== Winners ==
Edition	Yacht	Skipper	Designer
IOR Rating 18.0'
1967 La Rochelle	Safari (FRA)		Michel Dufour (prototype)
1968 La Rochelle	Dame d'Iroise (FRA)		Super Challenger (prototype)
1969 Sandhamn	Scampi (SWE)		Peter Norlin (prototype)
1970 Sandhamn	Scampi II (SWE)		Peter Norlin (prototype)
IOR Rating 21.7'
1971 Portsmouth	Scampi III (SWE)		Peter Norlin (prototype)
1972 Marstrand	Bes (DEN)	Paul Elvstrøm (DEN)	Jan Kjærulff & Paul Elvstom (prototype)
1973 Hundested	Impensable (FRA)	Michel Briand	Mauric (prototype)
1974 La Rochelle	North Star (FRG)	Eckard Wagner	Doug Peterson (prototype)
1975 Chicago	Foxy Lady (AUS)		Doug Peterson (prototype)
1976 Trieste	Silver Shamrock (IRL)	Harrold Cudmore (IRE)	Ron Holland 1976 (prototype)
1977 Sydney	Rangiriri (NZL)		Bruce Farr (prototype)
1978 Poole	Waverider (NZL)	Tony Bouzaid (NZL)	Davidson (prototype)
IOR Rating 22.0'
1979 Scheveningen	Waverider (NZL)		Davidson (prototype)
1980 Sandhamm	Ar Bigouden (FRA)		Joubert Nivelt 1980 (prototype)
1981 Poole	King One (FRA)	Paul Elvstrøm (DEN)	Berret 1981 (production)
1982 Piraeus	Atlanti (GRE)	George Andreadis (GRE)	Joubert Nivelt 1982 (prototype)
1983 Hankø	Freelance (FRA)		Briand (prototype)
1984 Troon	Cofica (FRA)		Berret (prototype)
1985 Porto Ercole	Antheor (FRA)		Andrieu (prototype)
1986 Helsinki	F9095 Cofica	Léon BRILLOUET (FRA)	Berret (prototype)
1987 La Rochelle	EJP2 (FRA)		Andrieu 1983 (prototype)
1988 Poole	F9260 Skipper Elf	Antoine LEBEC (FRA)	Andrieu 1988 (prototype)
1989 Le Havre	F9260 Skipper Elf	(FRA)	Andrieu 1988 (prototype)
1990 Howth	Innovation Group (IRL)		Berret 1989 (prototype)
1991 Jakobstad	Hasse (FIN)		Berret 1989 (prototype)
1992 Chioggia	E3035 Marfrio (ESP)	Pedro Campos Calvo-Sotelo (ESP)	Bullit (prototype)
1993 Bayona	Atlanti (GRE)	George Andreadis (GRE)	Joubert 1982 (prototype)

== See also ==
- One Ton Cup
- Quarter Ton Cup
