= Paul Whiting =

New Zealand designer

Paul Whiting was a highly influential New Zealand yacht designer during the 1970s and early 1980s.

He followed Bruce Farr in challenging accepted notions of offshore racing yacht design.

Whiting was lost at sea in 1980 on his return from the Sydney to Hobart Yacht Race in Smackwater Jack. A search failed to find any trace of the yacht or its crew. A 2008 newspaper report stated that part of the cockpit was found at Ripiro Beach on the west coast of the North Island.

A tribute to Paul Whiting was held at the Ponsonby Cruising Club Auckland in May 2025 with Kevin Lidgard introducing Penny Whiting MBE., Tony Whiting and Grant Whiting.

== Notable Designs ==
Reactor 25 (1968): His debut design, notable for its performance and popularity.

Magic Bus (1977): A Quarter-Tonner that achieved international acclaim including winning the world championship in Corpus Christi (Texas).

Candu II and Howzat: Half-tonners that showcased Whiting's innovative approach to design.

Newspaper Taxi: A centerboarder that dominated the 1977 South Pacific Half Ton Cup.

Whiting 29: Over 50 Whiting 29 yachts were produced between 1979 and 1990.
