= Pierre Arbaut =

French sailor

Personal information
- Nationality: French
- Born: 16 May 1876; Arcachon, France
- Died: 22 November 1948 (aged 72); Cannes, France

Sport
- Sport: Sailing

Pierre Arbaut (16 May 1876 – 22 November 1948) was a French sailor. He competed in the 8 Metre event at the 1936 Summer Olympics.
