= International One Design =

Sail boat class in yacht racing

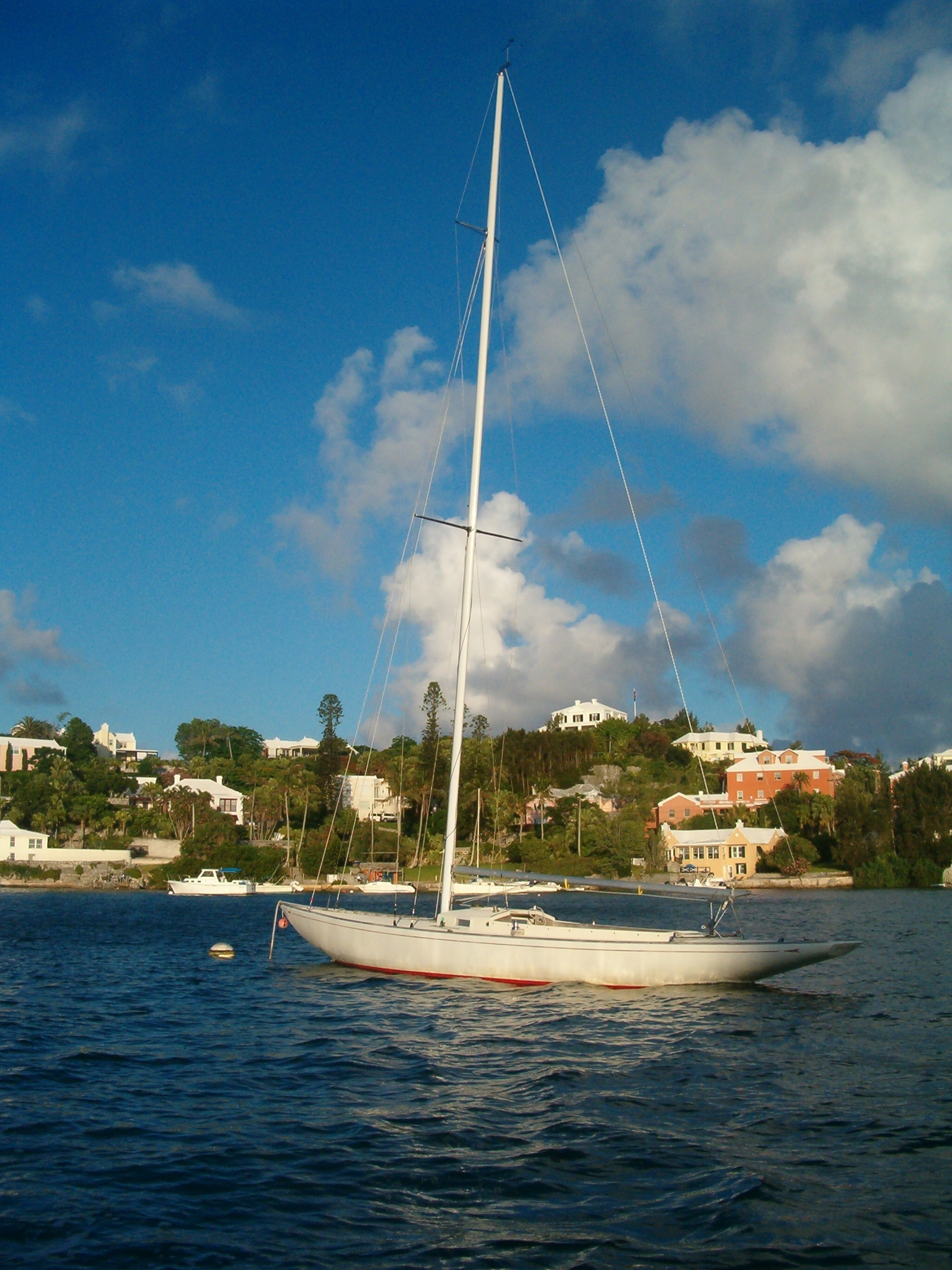
- An IOD racer on Hamilton Harbour, Bermuda, in 2006.

Development
- Designer: Bjarne Aas
- Year: 1936

Boat
- Draft: 1.6 m (5.4 ft)

Hull
- LOA: 10 m (33 ft)
- LWL: 6.6 m (21.5 ft)
- Beam: 2.1 m (6.9 ft)

The International One Design (IOD, International) is a class of sail boat developed in 1936 for yacht racing. It is a 33-foot open-cockpit day sailer used for day racing, rather than for overnight or ocean races. Popularised prior to the Second World War, the International One Design class is considered a classic one today.

== Origin ==
The International class sloop was created by American yachtsman, Cornelius Shields, as he sought to create a new one design yacht for the Amorita Cup series of team races between Bermuda and Long Island Sound. While in Bermuda one spring, he looked at a Bermudian Six Metre, the Saga, owned by Kenneth and Eldon Trimingham, and knew instantly that he had seen the prototype of a racing class boat.

Inspired by the beauty of the Six Metre yacht and its performance, Shields envisioned using it as the basis of a one design racing class that would have the advantages of both limiting the upwardly-spiraling costs of yacht racing and putting competing crews on an equal footing as far as equipment was concerned.

Shields commissioned Saga's designer-builder, Bjarne Aas of Fredrikstad, Norway, to develop plans for a one-design version of Saga. He negotiated with Aas to reduce the size of the Saga's design to produce a 33-foot (10 m) racer. The resulting design was smaller than the Saga, with less displacement, but greater beam of 6 ft 9 in (2.06 m). It measured 21 ft 5 in (6.53 m) in at the waterline, had a draft of 5 ft 4 in (1.63 m), and displaced 7,120 lb (3,230 kg). The mast was 45 ft (13.72 m), carrying 426 square feet (40 m^{2}) of sail. The design of the boat is what is known as a Bermuda sloop, or a Marconi sloop, being single-masted and Bermuda rigged. The result may be considered a reminder of yachting's "Golden age" with the traditional metre-boat's long overhangs, graceful sheer, deep, narrow hull, and lofty rig.

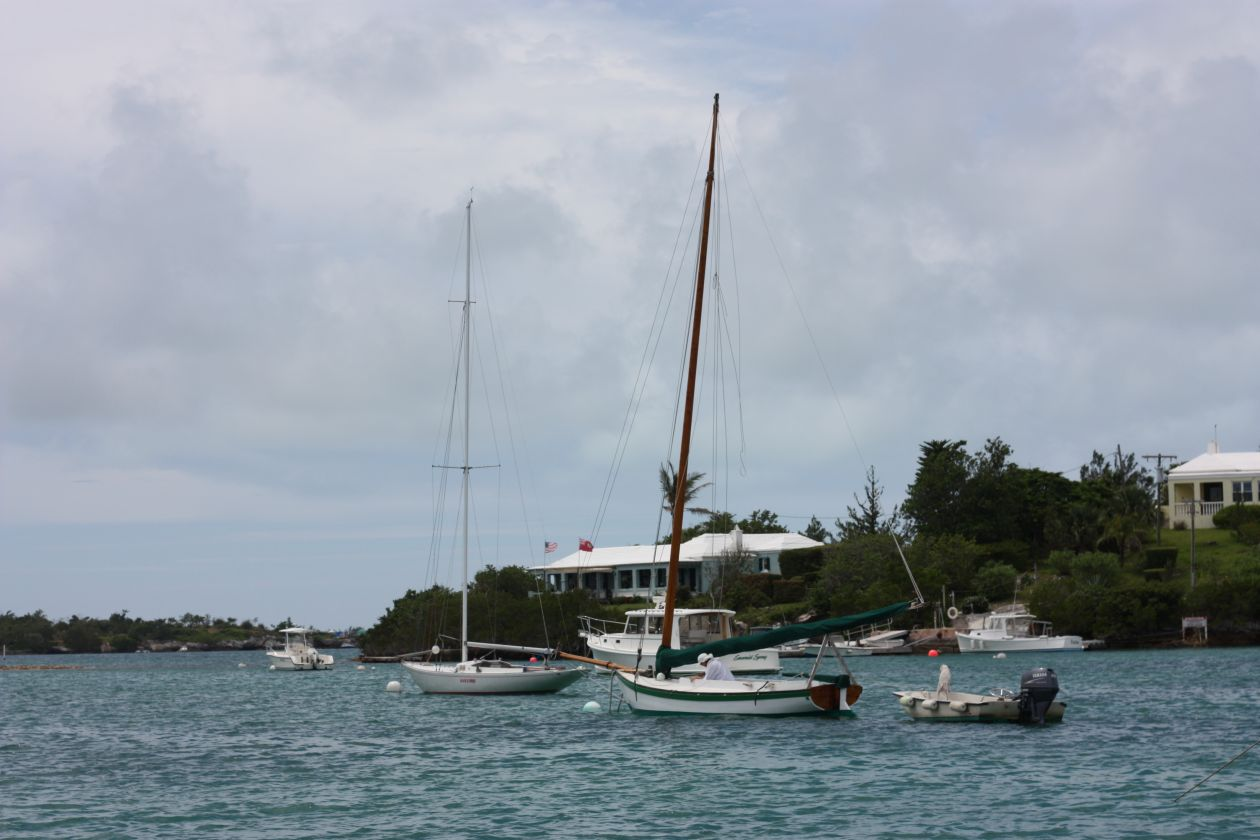
An IOD sloop and a 19th-century Bermudian working boat in Bermuda

The cost of an IOD in 1936 was $2,670. Sails, spars, running rigging, cradle, insurance, and shipping charges from Norway were included in the price. With the backing of the enthusiastic Shields, the boat was quickly adopted by the top racers on Long Island Sound. The first of the initial order of 25 yachts was delivered at City Island, New York in December 1936. "I finally arranged to sail her the week after Christmas...the first time anyone had sailed an International,” recalled Shields, many years later. “I don't think I've ever had a more joyous day on the water. The wind was from the northeast, light in the morning and then stronger at mid-day, so we had a chance to try her out under a variety of conditions. The boat was a delight to handle, and balanced perfectly. I felt great satisfaction at this -- the planning and hope and care hadn't been in vain."

The Internationals quickly spread. Bermuda took delivery of seven in January 1937. The next year's fleets were established in Marblehead, Massachusetts and Northeast Harbor, Maine, followed by fleets in Norway and Cowes. During the war, legend says that Aas buried the construction jigs to protect them during the Nazi occupation. After the liberation of Norway, construction resumed at Fredrikstad with boats going to San Francisco, Sweden, France, Oyster Bay, and Cowes. Fiberglass construction was introduced in the 1960s with great care taken by the class to ensure that the wood and glass yachts could race on an equal basis. Today, there are twelve fleets racing around the world— Bermuda, Norway (two fleets - (Fredrikstad and Tønsberg), the United Kingdom (St. Mawes, Falmouth), Sweden (Stenungsund), Canada (Chester, Nova Scotia), New York (three fleets -- Larchmont, Manhattan, and Fishers Island), Maine (Northeast Harbor), Massachusetts (two fleets -- Marblehead and Nantucket), and California (San Francisco Bay).

Most recently, IODs were the first class awarded International Classic Yacht status by the International Sailing Federation (ISAF).

== Racing ==
IOD Racing commenced on Long Island Sound during the summer of 1937. The very first trophy awarded for and IOD race was won by Allegra Knapp, sister to famed American sailor Arthur Knapp. Shields' determination to keep the competition on a man-to-man basis maintained the high quality of racing from the beginning. Soon there were thirty five IODs racing in Long Island Sound. The class took hold in and was used for the first ever competition for the Amorita Cup. In the next 28 matches, from then to 1964, held to compete for the cup (21 in Bermuda, and 8 on Long Island Sound), the Americans won 13 times, and the Bermudians 16.

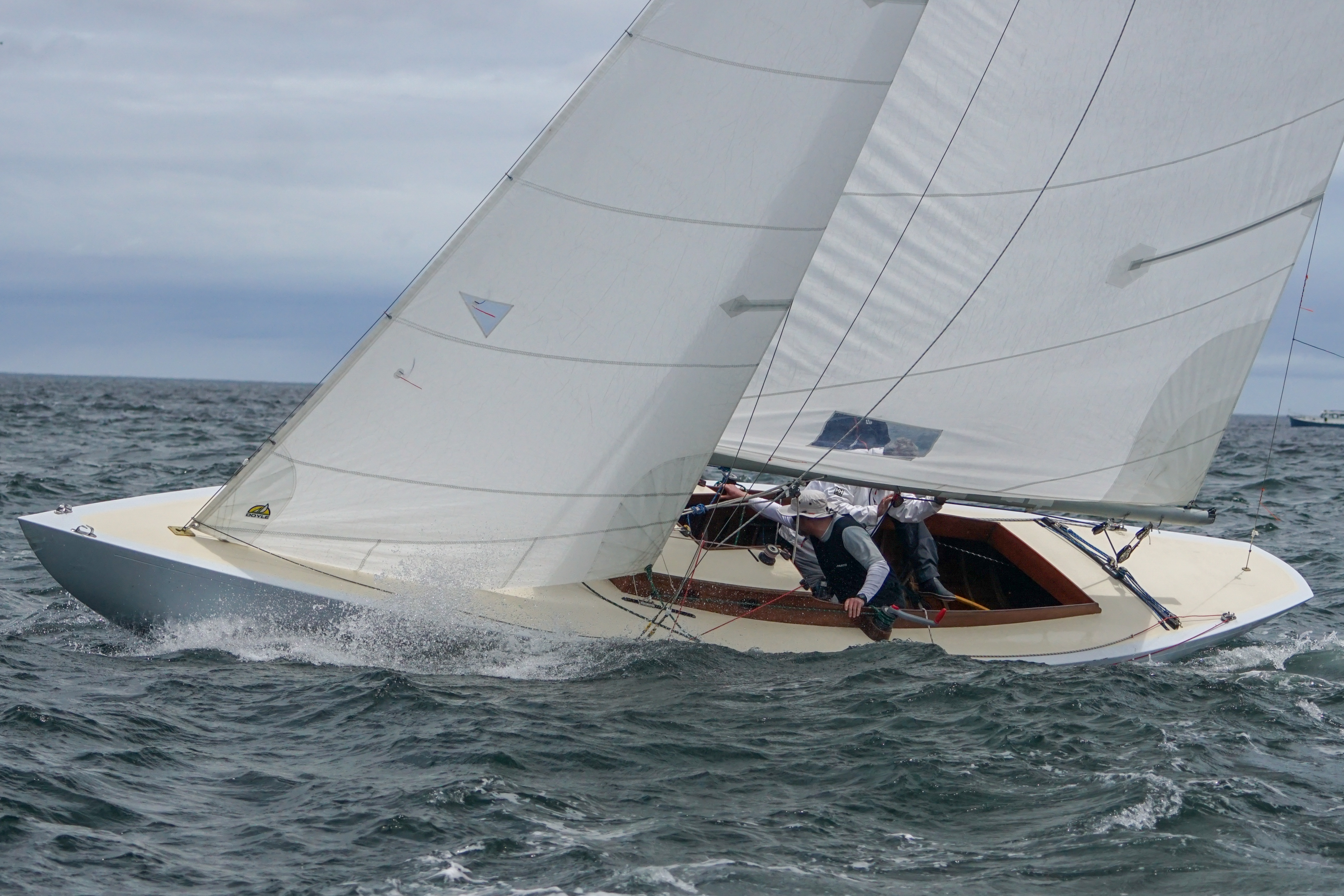
IOD #46 - VIKING - racing in Marblehead in June 2019

Today IODs are actively raced in twelve local fleets in North America and Europe. Representatives of those fleets annually compete in a World Championship (the venue of which rotates between the fleets), a North American Championship, Bermuda Race Week, the Nantucket Invitational, a European Championship and occasional Team-racing championships hosted by individual fleets. Yachts from the International One Design class are used for the annual Bermuda Gold Cup as part of the professional World Match Racing Circuit. The current (2024) World Champion is Jonathan Farrar, representing the Fishers Island Fleet.

== One-design principles ==
Since its founding, the International Class has remained committed to the tradition of testing sailing skills in equally equipped yachts. The Class' extensive one-design rules endeavor to ensure that the hulls, rigs and sails of the racing yachts are near equal as possible. All International owners agree to honor this Class principle.

With any racing yacht, the largest contributor to variable costs are the sails. A boat with newer sails will almost always have a greater speed potential than a boat with older sails of the same design. To keep costs low and ensure that each boat is racing with the most equal sails possible, the IOD class has evolved a very specific sail purchase program that is required to be implemented by each local fleet. The Class encourages each local fleet to develop sails for their boats that suit the specific characteristics of their local sailing area.

Unlike many other one-design fleets, however, individual boats, are not granted free license on how frequently they replace their sails. Instead, each local fleet votes each year on what sail, if any, will be purchased before a given season. The chosen sail (mainsail, jib or spinnaker) is ordered in a single lot from the local fleet's official sailmaker, who pledges to make them as near equal as possible. No recutting, or use of alternate sails is permitted. Usually fleets adopt a sail purchase schedule that only requires the purchase of one sail per year. The result of this unique sail purchase program is a racing fleet of equally equipped boats that are maintained at a low cost to the individual owners.

To further equalize the playing field during International and Interfleet regattas, a change-boat series is presented by the host fleet. Competitors do not bring their own boats to such an event, rather they are invited to sail in the boats of the host fleet. Boats are rotated after every race, or at some events, each day. To make sure that no competing team gain an advantage through this process, the boats are distributed by random drawing and any local representative is prohibited, by rule, from sailing their own boat.

== Class organization ==
In 1946, Bill John, William S. Cox, George Hinman, Arthur Knapp Jr., A.E. "Bill" Luders Jr., Emil Mosbacher Jr. and Roderick Stephens Jr. codified the ethos of the class to prevent it moving away from its intended single design nature. This was achieved partly by ensuring only the original builder could produce boats for the class. In the late 1960s, fibreglass construction began. Today, there are three authorised builders of boats for this class: Tjorns Yacht Service, in Sweden, and South Shore Marine and Tern Boatworks in Chester Nova Scotia. The most recent all wooden IOD, built from the original 1936 drawings, was constructed in 2009 by Tern Boatworks, in Chester, Nova Scotia. The class was overseen by a five-man class committee (headed by Shields until 1960). The committee was as responsible for publicizing the class as regulating it.

IODs were the first class awarded International Classic Yacht status by the International Sailing Federation (ISAF).
