= Paul Elvstrøm =

Danish yachtsman (1928 – 2016)

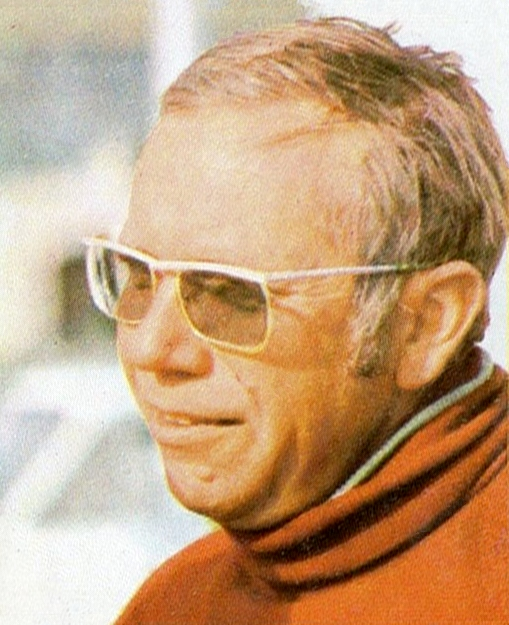
- Elvstrøm c. 1972

Personal information
- Full name: Paul Bert Elvstrøm
- Nationality: Danish
- Born: 25 February 1928 Hellerup, Denmark
- Died: 7 December 2016 (aged 88) Hellerup, Denmark
- Height: 1.82 m (5 ft 11 1/2 in)
- Weight: 85 kg (187 lb)

Sailing career
- Sport: Sailing
- Club: Hellerup Sejlklub, Gentofte
- Retired: 1988
- Classes: 5.5 Metre, 505, Finn, Firefly, Flying Dutchman, Snipe, Soling, Star, Tornado
Medal record
Sailing
Representing Denmark
International athletics competitions
Event	1st	2nd	3rd
Olympic Games	4	0	0
World Championships	13	2	2
Total	17	2	2
Olympic Games
Gold medal – first place	1948 London	Firefly class
Gold medal – first place	1952 Helsinki	Finn class
Gold medal – first place	1956 Melbourne	Finn class
Gold medal – first place	1960 Rome	Finn class
World Championships
Gold medal – first place	1957 La Baule	505 class
Gold medal – first place	1958 La Baule	505 class
Gold medal – first place	1958 Zeebrugge	Finn class
Gold medal – first place	1959 Copenhagen	Finn class
Gold medal – first place	1959 Porto Alegre	Snipe class
Gold medal – first place	1962 St. Petersburg	Flying Dutchman class
Gold medal – first place	1966 Copenhagen	5.5 metres class
Gold medal – first place	1966 Kiel	Star class
Gold medal – first place	1967 Copenhagen	Star class
Gold medal – first place	1969 Copenhagen	Soling class
Gold medal – first place	1972 Marstrand	Half Ton class
Gold medal – first place	1974 Sydney	Soling class
Gold medal – first place	1981 Poole	Half Ton class
Silver medal – second place	1956 Burnham	Finn class
Silver medal – second place	1969 San Diego	Star class
Bronze medal – third place	1971 New York	Soling class
Bronze medal – third place	1985 Travemünde	Tornado class

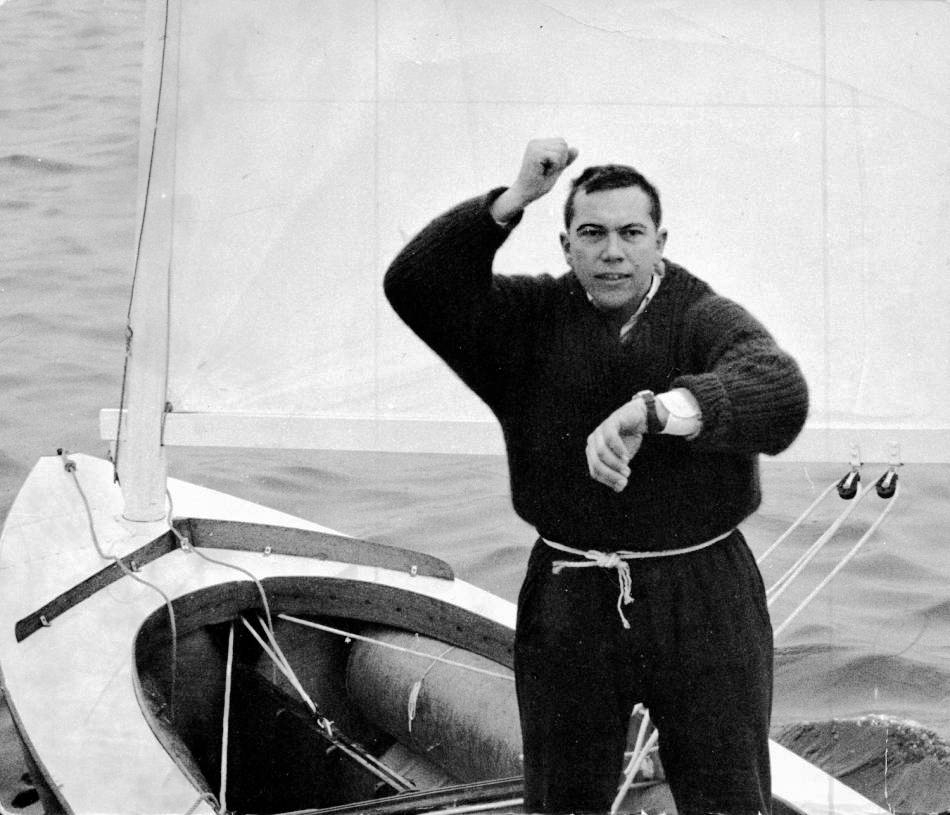
Elvstrøm at the 1960 Olympics

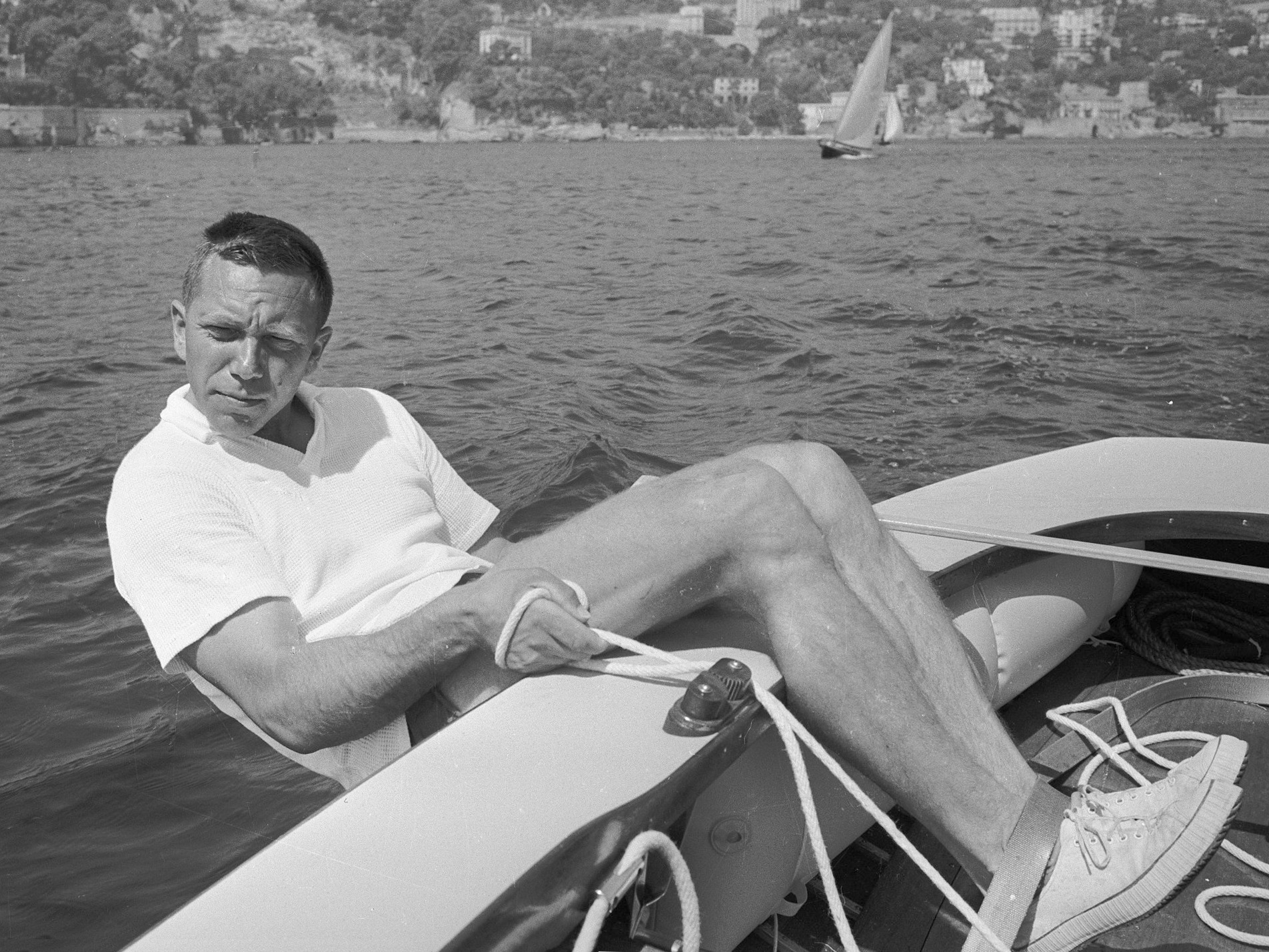
Elvstrøm at the 1960 Olympics

Paul Bert Elvstrøm (25 February 1928 – 7 December 2016) was a Danish yachtsman and the founder of Elvstrøm Sails. He won four Olympic gold medals and thirteen world titles in a range of classes including Snipe, Soling, Star, Flying Dutchman, Finn, 505, and 5.5 Metre. For his achievements, Elvstrøm was chosen as "Danish Sportsman of the Century."

== Early life ==
Paul Elvstrøm was born, north of Copenhagen, in a house overlooking the sound between Denmark and Sweden. His father was a sea captain but died when Elvstrøm was young, and he was brought up by his mother along with a brother and sister. A second brother drowned at the age of 5 when he fell off a seawall near the family home.

Growing up along the Øresund, Elvstrøm quickly became consumed by sailing, which began with crewing in a club fleet of small clinker keelboats. He was soon given an Oslo dinghy by a neighbour who realised Elvstrøm's mother was too poor to be able to buy one.

In his book Elvstrøm Speaks on Yacht Racing he claimed to be ‘word blind’ and could not read or write when he was at school, which may have been due to dyslexia. It is clear that Elvstrøm considered schooling a distraction from sailing: "I was very bad in school," he said, "The only interest I had was in sailing fast…The teacher knew that if I was not at school, I was sailing."

After leaving school he became a member of the Hellerup Sailing Club, where he gained a reputation as an excellent sailer. He was funding himself during this period as a bricklayer, but in 1954 also started cutting sails for club members in his basement.

== Innovation ==
Elvstrøm was noted as a developer of sails and sailing equipment, and later founded Elvstrøm sails. One of his most successful innovations was a new type of self-bailer. The new features were a wedge shaped venturi that closes automatically if the boat grounds or hits an obstruction, and a flap that acts as a non return valve to minimise water coming in if the boat is stationary or moving too slowly for the device to work. Previous automatic bailers would be damaged or destroyed if they met an obstruction, and would let considerable amounts of water in if the boat was moving too slowly.

The Elvstrøm self-bailer is still in production under the Andersen brand and has been widely copied; it is still found on Olympic boats, and other grand prix boats at the leading edge of the sport. In 2016, Dan Ibsen, the executive director of the Royal Danish Yacht Club said, “Today the Elvstrøm Bailer is still the only functional bailer on Olympic dinghies and boats around the world.”

Other innovations include the Elvstrøm Lifejacket, which was the first specifically designed and produced for active sailors.

He also popularised the kicking strap, or boom vang (US). This may take the form of a block and tackle linking a low point on the mast (or an equivalent point on the hull) and the boom close to the mast, which allows the boom to be let out when reaching or running without lifting. This controls the twist of the mainsail from its foot to its head, increasing the sail's power and the boat's speed and controllability. Elvstrøm did not advertise his new invention, leaving his competitors mystified at his superior boat-speed. Investigation of his dinghy revealed nothing as he used to remove the kicking strap before coming ashore.

Among the innovative concepts he brought to sailboat racing was the concept of gates instead of a single windward or leeward mark in large regattas. The leeward gate on a windward-leeward course is commonly used. The windward gate is less often used due to the difficulties in managing right-of-way around the right gate, the subtleties of which are understood mostly by match racers. He has also been instrumental in developing several international yacht racing rules.

== Training ==
Elvstrøm was a very early innovator in training techniques. For example, he used the technique of 'sitting out' or hiking using toe-straps to a greater degree than previously, getting all his body weight from the knees upwards outside the boat, thus providing extra leverage to enable the boat to remain level in stronger winds and hence go faster than his competitors. This technique required great strength and fitness, and so after the 1948 Olympics, in order to improve his physical conditioning in readiness for the 1952 games, Elvstrøm built a training bench with toe-straps in his garage to replicate the sitting-out position in his dinghy. He then proceeded to spend many training hours on dry land sitting out on the bench at home.

“He did take sailing to a level that you had to call it a sport,” said Jesper Bank, a principal at Elvstrøm Sails and a two-time Olympic gold medalist for Denmark. “Before Paul, you would see competitors with pipes in their mouths and wearing skippers’ caps. At that time, they certainly thought he was superhuman.”

According to an obituary by the International Finn Association, "He was a sportsman and the first real sailing athlete. He trained harder and longer than anyone else so that when the day of the race came he was better prepared than anyone else. He was famous for his physical strength and fitness, able to out-hike anyone on the race course.”

== Business ==
In 1954, Elvstrøm established a manufacturing company, Elvstrøm Sails, whose products included masts, booms, and sails. Displaying a keen marketing mind to go along with his engineering nous, the business grew rapidly and by the 1970s Elvstrøm products were seen on boats all around the world.

Today, Elvstrøm Sails is among the world's leading sailmakers, employing around 300 worldwide. Elvstrøm founded his business in the family villa just north of Copenhagen. It grew out of its premises multiple times, and today, Elvstrøm Sails is based in Aabenraa in the south of Denmark.

== Personal life ==
Elvstrøm was married to Anne, who pre-deceased him by three years; together they had four daughters: Pia, Stine, Gitte and Trine.

Elvstrøm continued to sail in his later years until Parkinson's disease began to afflict him. In 2009 he sailed his Dragonfly trimaran — solo — to visit his daughter Gitte and her family on the east coast of Sweden, 600 miles from his home.

Elvstrøm's success and celebrity brought personal stress. At the 1972 Games in Munich, under the pressures of competition and his challenges facing his sail-making business, he suffered a nervous breakdown.

He died on 7 December 2016 at the age of 88, after battling Alzheimers for a few years.

== Legacy ==
In addition to being widely regarded as one of the most successful competitive sailors in history, Elvstrøm was recognized as a model of sportsmanship. He is frequently cited for his philosophy: "If you, by winning, are losing your friends, you are not winning."

== Achievements ==
Elvstrøm competed in eight Olympic Games from 1948 to 1988, being one of only nine persons ever (the others are sailor Ben Ainslie, swimmers Michael Phelps and Katie Ledecky, wrestlers Kaori Icho and Mijaín López, speed skater Ireen Wüst and athletes Carl Lewis in the long jump and Al Oerter in the discus) to win four consecutive individual gold medals (1948–60), first time in a Firefly, subsequently in Finns. In his last two Olympic games he sailed the Tornado Catamaran class, which, in those days, was normally sailed by two young men, with his daughter Trine Elvstrøm as forward hand.

He is one of only five athletes who have competed in the Olympics over a span of 40 years, along with fencer Ivan Joseph Martin Osiier, sailors Magnus Konow and Durward Knowles and showjumper Ian Millar.

Elvstrøm won medals at the world championships: Finn, 505, Snipe, Flying Dutchman, 5.5 Metre, Star, Soling, Tornado, and Half Ton.

In 1996, Elvstrøm was chosen as "Danish Sportsman of the Century."

In 2007, Elvstrøm was among the first six inductees into the ISAF Sailing Hall of Fame.

Year	Competition	Venue	Position	Event	Notes
1956	Finn Gold Cup	(United Kingdom) Burnham-on-Crouch	2nd	Finn	
1957	505 World Championship	(France) La Baule-Escoublac	1st	505	
1958	505 World Championship	(France) La Baule-Escoublac	1st	505	
1958	Finn Gold Cup	(Belgium) Zeebrugge	1st	Finn	
1959	Finn Gold Cup	(Denmark) Copenhagen	1st	Finn	
1959	Snipe World Championship	(Brazil) Porto Alegre	1st	Snipe	
1962	Flying Dutchman World Championship	(United States) St. Petersburg	1st	Flying Dutchman	
1966	5.5 Metre World Championship	(Denmark) Copenhagen	1st	5.5 metres	
1966	Star World Championship	(Germany) Kiel	1st	Star	
1967	Star World Championship	(Denmark) Copenhagen	1st	Star	
1969	Soling World Championship	(Denmark) Copenhagen	1st	Soling	
1969	Star World Championship	(United States) San Diego	2nd	Star	
1971	Soling World Championship	(United States) New York	3rd	Soling	
1972	Half Ton Cup / World Championship	(Sweden) Marstrand	1st	Half Ton	
1974	Soling World Championship	(Australia) Sydney	1st	Soling	
1985	Tornado World Championship	(Germany) Travemünde	3rd	Tornado	
1981	Half Ton Cup / World Championship	(United Kingdom) Poole	1st	Half Ton	

== Bibliography ==
- Elvstrom, Paul. Expert Dinghy and Keelboat Racing, 1967, Times Books, ISBN 0-8129-0054-5
- Elvstrom, Paul. Elvström Speaks on Yacht Racing, 1970, One-Design & Offshore Yachtsman Magazine, ISBN 0-8129-0134-7
- Elvstrom, Paul. Elvström Speaks -- to His Sailing Friends on His Life and Racing Career, 1970, Nautical Publishing Company, ISBN 0-245-59851-0
- Paul Elvström Explains the Yacht Racing Rules, First edition 1969, title updated to Paul Elvstrom Explains the Racing Rules of Sailing: 2005–2008 Rules. Updated four-yearly in accordance with racing rules revisions, various authors and publishers. ISBN 0-07-145626-0

== See also ==
- Elvstrøm 717
- List of athletes with the most appearances at Olympic Games
- List of multiple Olympic gold medalists in one event
- Multiple World champion in sailing
