= Sun Fast 3200 =

Sailboat class

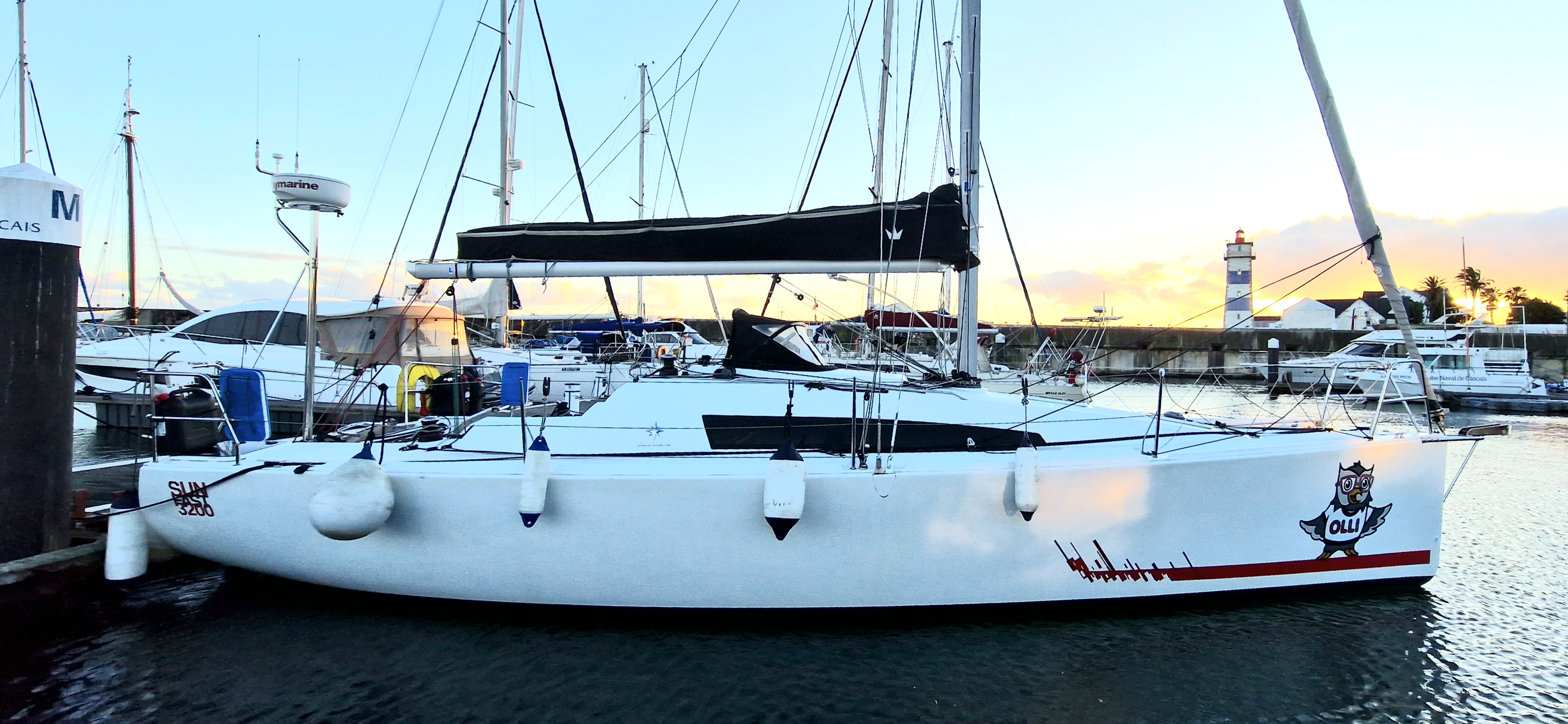

Development
- Designer: Daniel Andrieu
- Location: France
- Year: 2008
- No. built: 150 (2015)
- Builder: Jeanneau
- Role: Racer-Cruiser
- Name: Sun Fast 3200

Boat
- Displacement: 7,496 lb (3,400 kg)
- Draft: 6.16 ft (1.88 m)

Hull
- Type: monohull
- Construction: fiberglass
- LOA: 33.08 ft (10.08 m)
- LWL: 32.00 ft (9.75 m)
- Beam: 11.42 ft (3.48 m)
- Engine: Yanmar 15 hp (11 kW) diesel engine

Hull appendages
- Keel: fin keel with weighted bulb
- Ballast: 2,866 lb (1,300 kg)
- Rudder: dual rudders

Rig
- Rig type: Bermuda rig
- I foretriangle height: 41.01 ft (12.50 m)
- J foretriangle base: 12.63 ft (3.85 m)
- P mainsail luff: 38.71 ft (11.80 m)
- E mainsail foot: 13.94 ft (4.25 m)

Sails
- Sailplan: fractional rigged sloop
- Mainsail area: 361 sq ft (33.5 m^{2})
- Jib/genoa area: 288 sq ft (26.8 m^{2})
- Spinnaker area: 892 sq ft (82.9 m^{2})
- Upwind sail area: 649 sq ft (60.3 m^{2})
- Downwind sail area: 1,253 sq ft (116.4 m^{2})

Racing
- PHRF: 75-90

The Sun Fast 3200 is a French sailboat that was designed by Daniel Andrieu as a racer-cruiser and was first built in 2008. The nomenclature indicates a waterline length of 32.00 ft (9.75 m).

The Sun Fast 3200 is part of the Sun Fast sailboat range and was named 2008 - European Yacht of the Year: L < 10m.

It was replaced in production by the Sun Fast 3300 in 2019.

== Production ==
The design was built by Jeanneau in France, from 2008 to 2019, but it is now out of production.

The boat was originally conceived as a limited production design for the Transquadra, a single or double-handed transatlantic race for sailors over 40 years of age. Production was initially intended for 15 to 20 boats, but the design found commercial success and over 150 had been built by 2015. Matthew Sheahan described it in Yachting World, "although loosely termed a racer, the category didn't fully describe what the Jeanneau Sun Fast 3200 was about. It became the sailing equivalent of the motor industry’s crossover category, a term to describe the growing range of suburban 4x4s – a multi-purpose racer."

== Design ==
The Sun Fast 3200 is a racing keelboat, built predominantly of polyester fiberglass, with wood trim. The hull is made from a vacuum-infused fiberglass-balsa sandwich, while the deck is a vacuum-infused PVC-fiberglass sandwich. It has a 19/20 fractional sloop rig, with a keel-stepped mast, two sets of swept spreaders and aluminum spars with discontinuous Dyform rigging. The hull has a plumb stem, a reverse transom, dual internally mounted spade-type rudders controlled by dual tillers and a fixed L-shaped fin keel with a weighted bulb. It displaces 7,496 lb (3,400 kg) and carries 2,877 lb (1,305 kg) of lead ballast in the standard keel and 2,998 lb (1,360 kg) in the straight lead keel.

The boat has a draft of 6.16 ft (1.88 m) with the standard keel or the straight lead keel.

The boat is fitted with a Japanese Yanmar diesel engine of 15 hp (11 kW) for docking and maneuvering. The fuel tank holds 20 U.S. gallons (76 L; 17 imp gal) and the soft fresh water tank has a capacity of 21 U.S. gallons (79 L; 17 imp gal).

The design has sleeping accommodation for six people, with two settee berths in the main cabin and an aft cabin with four single berths. The galley is located on the starboard side at the companionway ladder. The galley is L-shaped and is equipped with a two-burner stove, a top loading refrigerator, and a sink. A navigation station is opposite the galley, on the port side. The head is located in the bow and there is a sail storage compartment in the forepeak. Cabin maximum headroom is 76 in (193 cm) in the 2 cabins while the headroom at the front of the saloon is 64 in (163 cm).

For sailing downwind the design may be equipped with a symmetrical spinnaker of 892 sq ft (82.9 m^{2}).

The design has a hull speed of 7.10 kn (13.15 km/h) and a PHRF handicap of 75 to 90.

An updated R2 version of the boat introduced a redesigned cockpit, carbon fiber mast and a straight keel.

== Operational history ==
At one time, the boat was supported by a class club that organized racing events, the Sun Fast Association.

== See also ==
- List of sailing boat types
