= Sun Fast 3300 =

Sailboat class

Development
- Designer: Daniel Andrieu; Guillaume Verdier
- Location: France
- Year: 2019
- Builder: Jeanneau
- Role: Racer-Cruiser
- Name: Sun Fast 3300

Boat
- Displacement: 7,716 lb (3,500 kg)
- Draft: 6.40 ft (1.95 m)

Hull
- Type: monohull
- Construction: fiberglass
- LOA: 33.17 ft (10.11 m)
- LWL: 29.20 ft (8.90 m)
- Beam: 11.17 ft (3.40 m)
- Engine: Yanmar 15 hp (11 kW) diesel engine

Hull appendages
- Keel: fin keel
- Ballast: 3,086 lb (1,400 kg)
- Rudder: dual spade-type rudders

Rig
- Rig type: Bermuda rig
- I foretriangle height: 41 ft 0 in (12.50 m)
- J foretriangle base: 13 ft 10 in (4.22 m)
- P mainsail luff: 39 ft 5 in (12.01 m)
- E mainsail foot: 13 ft 1 in (3.99 m)

Sails
- Sailplan: 9/10 fractional rigged sloop
- Mainsail area: 355 sq ft (33.0 m^{2})
- Jib/genoa area: 291 sq ft (27.0 m^{2})
- Gennaker area: 1,184 sq ft (110.0 m^{2})
- Upwind sail area: 646 sq ft (60.0 m^{2})
- Downwind sail area: 1,539 sq ft (143.0 m^{2})

The Sun Fast 3300 is a French sailboat that was designed by Daniel Andrieu and Guillaume Verdier as a racer-cruiser and first built in 2019. Andrieu optimized the design for the International Rating Certificate rules, while Verdier conducted the computational fluid dynamics and finite element analysis on the design.

The Sun Fast 3300 is part of the Sun Fast sailboat range and replaced the Sun Fast 3200 in production.

The design was the Sailing World "2020 Boat of the Year: Overall Winner".

== Production ==
The design has been built by Jeanneau in France, since 2019 and remains in production.

== Design ==
The Sun Fast 3300 is a racing keelboat, built predominantly of vacuum infused polyester fiberglass. The fully soft chined hull is a fiberglass-balsa sandwich, while the deck is a fiberglass-foam sandwich. It has a 9/10 fractional sloop rig with a carbon fiber bowsprit, a deck-stepped mast, two sets of swept spreaders and aluminum spars, with discontinuous Dyform rigging. Axxon carbon fiber spars and rod rigging are factory options. The hull has a reverse raked stem, an open plumb transom, dual internally mounted spade-type rudders controlled by a single tiller with an extension and a fixed fin keel. It displaces 7,716 lb (3,500 kg) and carries 3,086 lb (1,400 kg) of cast iron and lead ballast.

The boat has a draft of 6.40 ft (1.95 m) with the standard keel. Two 53 U.S. gallons (200 L; 44 imp gal) water ballast tanks are a factory option. These transfer water from the leeward to the windward side tank via twin pumps.

The boat is fitted with a Japanese Yanmar diesel engine of 21 hp (16 kW) for docking and maneuvering. The fuel tank holds 13 U.S. gallons (49 L; 11 imp gal) and the fresh water tank has a capacity of 26 U.S. gallons (98 L; 22 imp gal).

The design has sleeping accommodation for six people, with a two straight settee berths in the main cabin and two aft cabins, each with two berths. The galley is located on the port side just forward of the companionway ladder. The galley is block-shaped and is equipped with a two-burner stove, an ice box and a sink. A navigation station is opposite the galley, on the starboard side. The head is located in the bow cabin.

For sailing downwind the design may be equipped with an asymmetrical spinnaker of 1,184 sq ft (110.0 m^{2}). The design has a hull speed of 7.24 kn (13.41 km/h).

The Sun Fast 3300 was intended to be raced single or double handed or with a full crew, including for transatlantic racing.

== Operational history ==
The boat was at one time supported by a class club that organized racing events, the Sun Fast Association.

In a 2019 review for Yachting World, Pip Hare wrote, "as soon as the jib started to drop the kite filled and BOOM! Even with my co-skipper on the front of the boat our bow actually leapt out of the water and we blasted off with some pace. The grin I was wearing sailing under spinnaker actually made my face hurt after a while. This boat is seriously fun, powerful and responsive. We sat at 130° true wind angle, playing in the waves, pushing to the limits – our top speed surfing was 14.3 knots and the other side of the bay arrived far too quickly."

In a 2020 Sail Magazine review, Adam Cort wrote, "underway, what most surprised me most about the Sun Fast 3300 was how well it went to windward. I was also pleased by how much room there was for the five crew we had aboard, this in spite of the spider’s web of control lines running about. Heading up to a 32-degree apparent wind angle in 7 knots quickly produced 5 knots of boatspeed and a lively, responsive helm. As expected, we pounded a little in the chop. But coming about was a piece of cake, and the boat felt wonderfully balanced throughout."

== See also ==
- List of sailing boat types
