= List of other classes of keelboats and yachts (A–L) =

The following is a partial list of keelboats and yacht types and sailing classes

== Keelboats and yachts ==
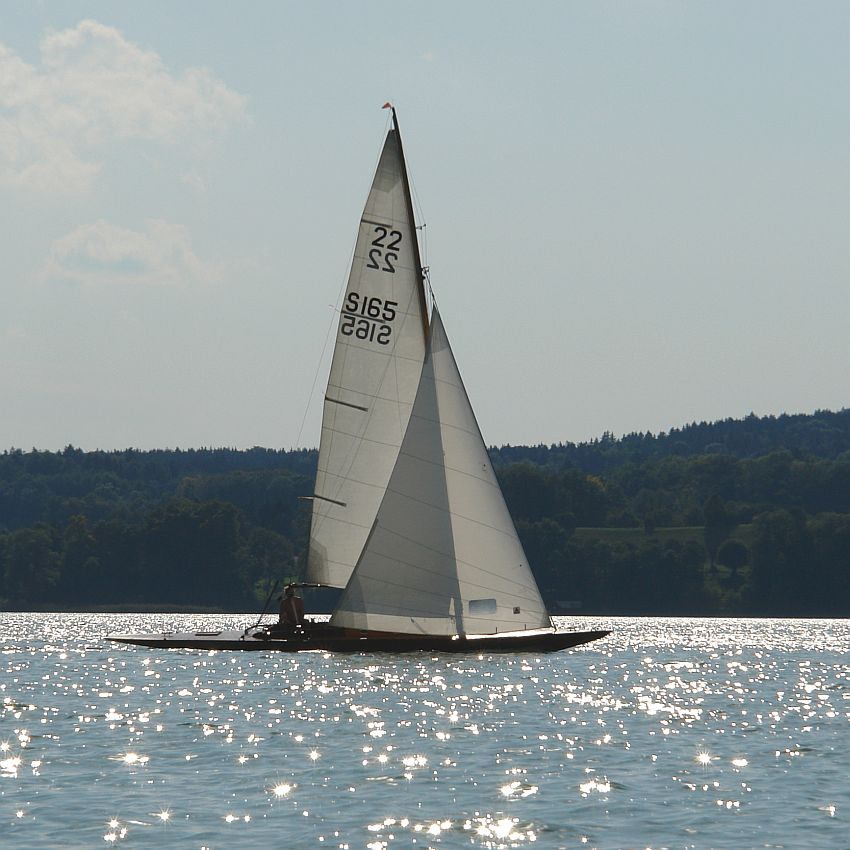
22 m^{2} Skerry cruiser

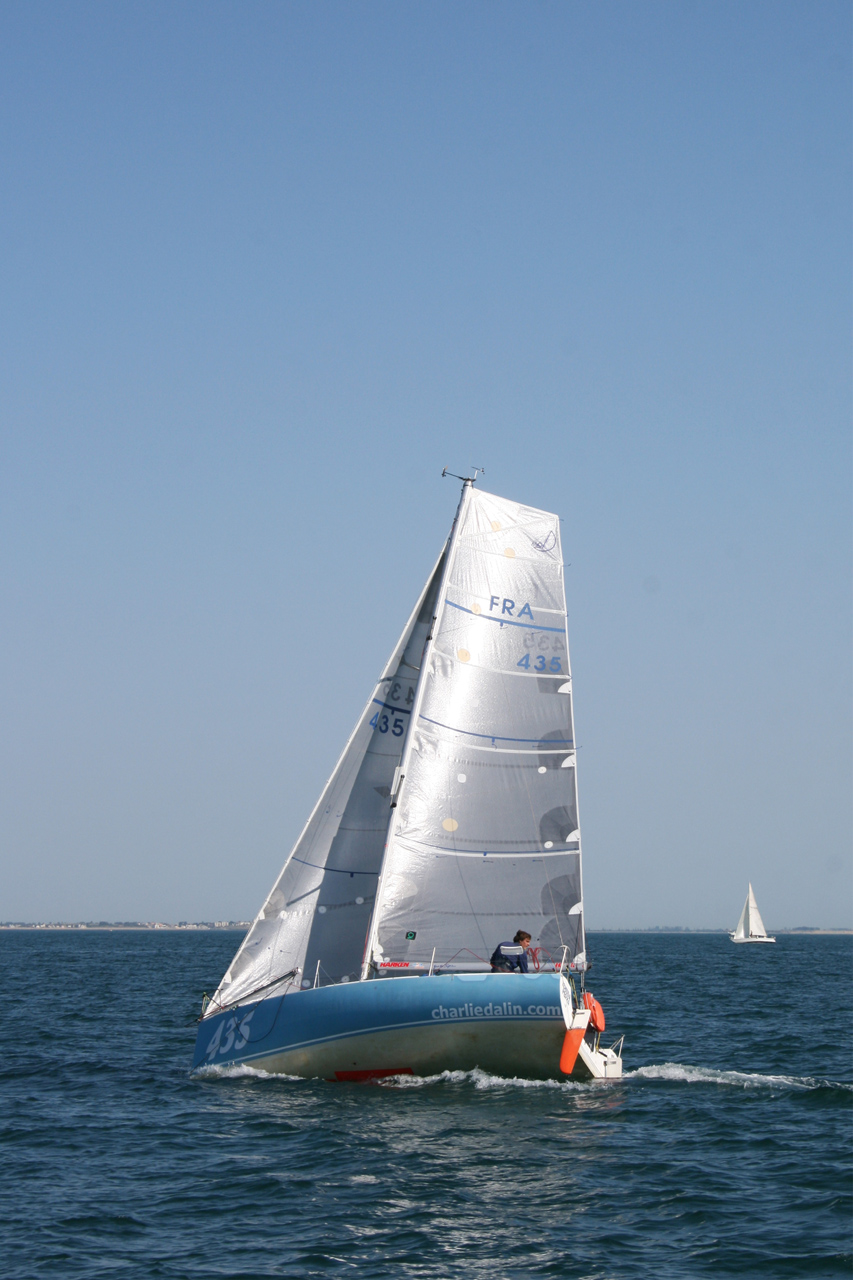
Classe Mini

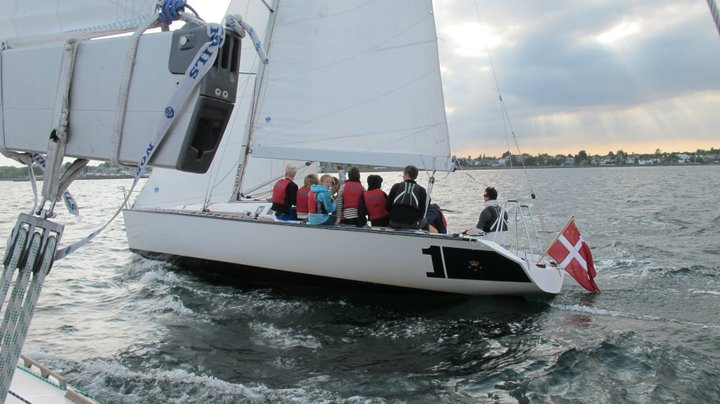
DS 37 Match Racer

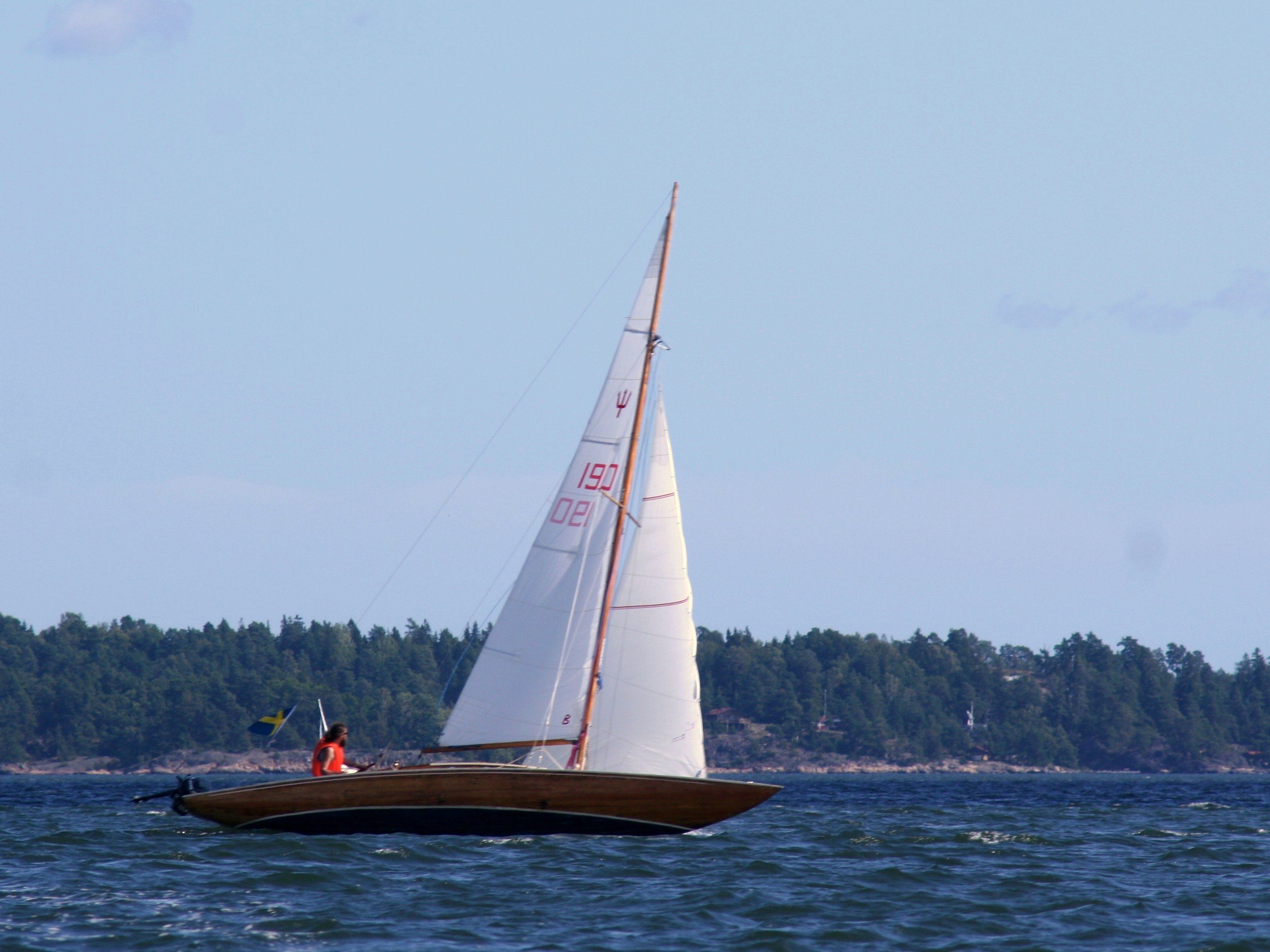
Neptunkryssare

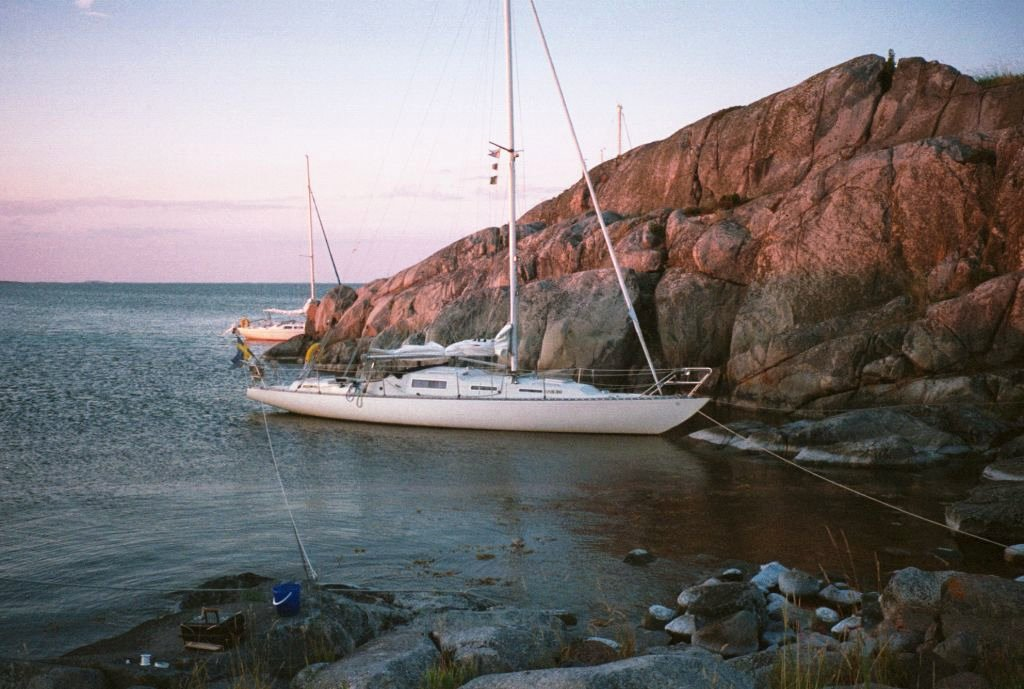
S 30

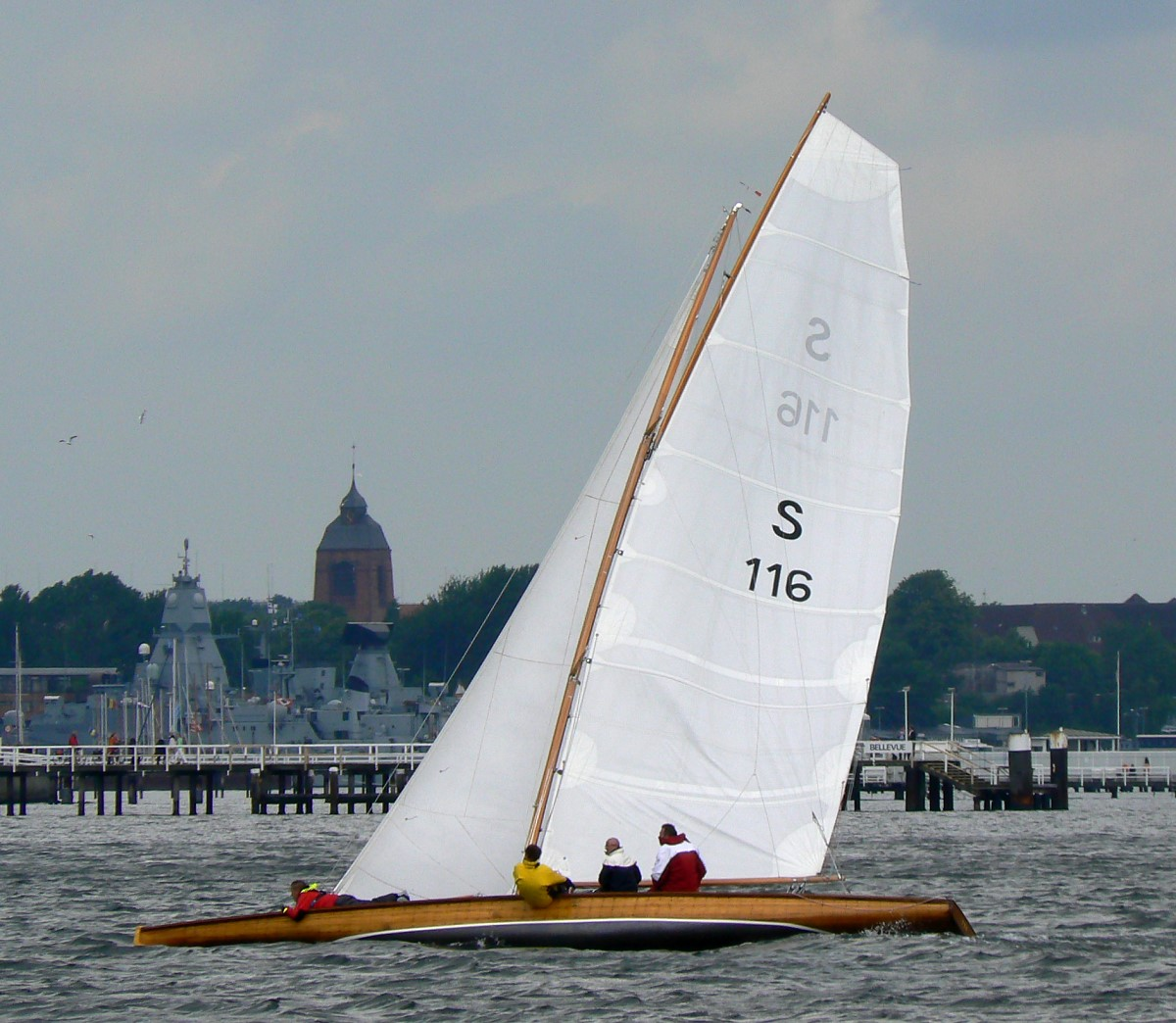
Sonderklasse

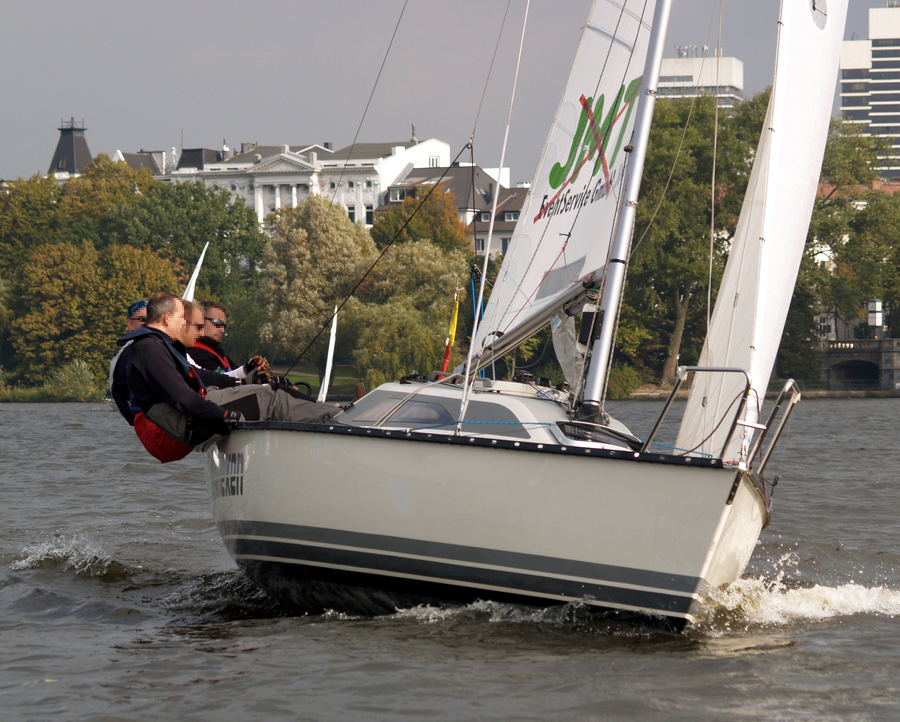
X-79

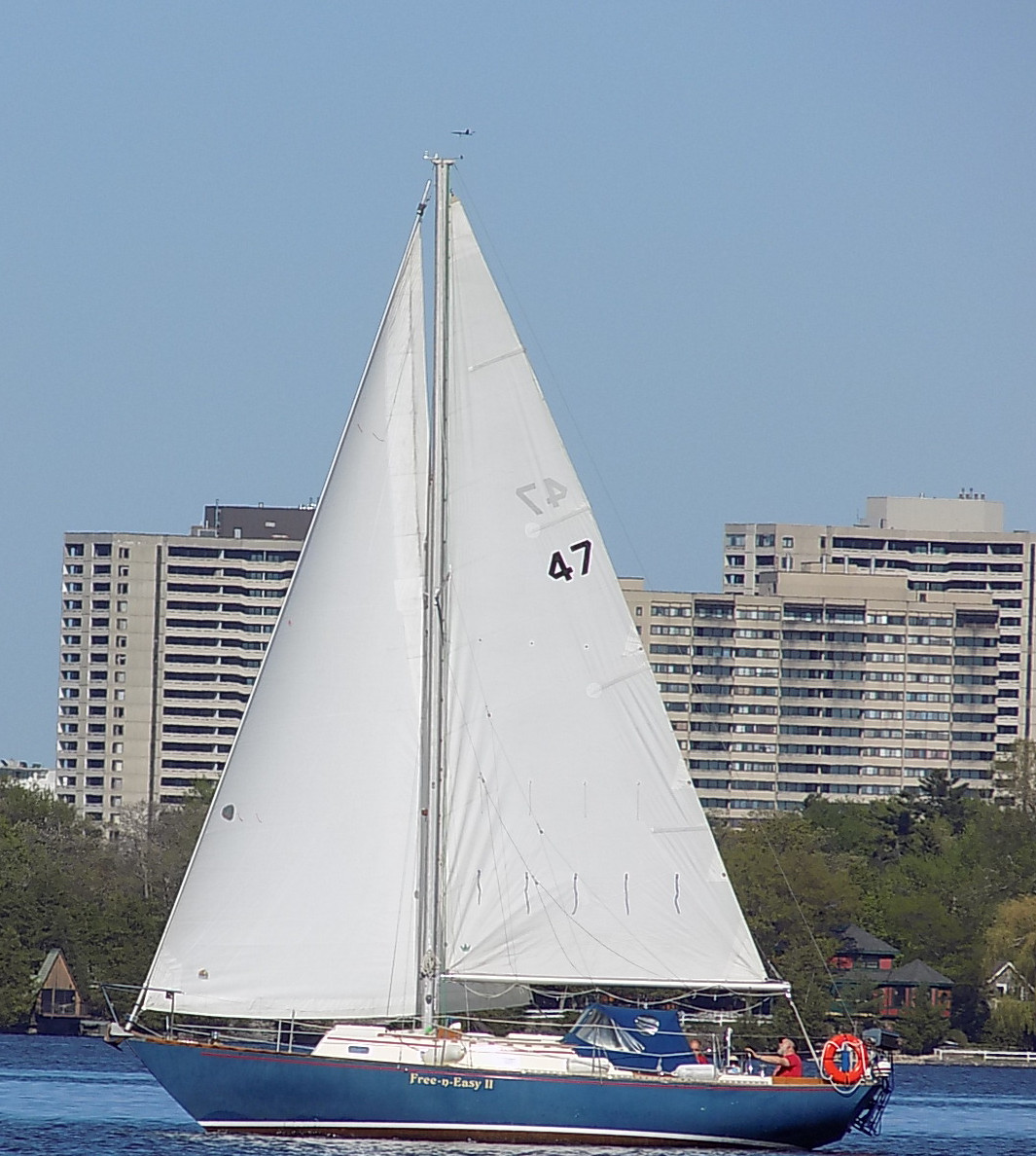
Corvette 31

Name	Year of first construction	Designer	Builder	Fleets	Ref
10 Metre		Development class			
120 m^{2} Skerry cruiser		Development class			
15 Metre		Development class			
150 m^{2} Skerry cruiser		Development class			
15 m^{2} Skerry cruiser		Development class			
22 m^{2} Skerry cruiser		Development class			
30 m^{2} Skerry cruiser		Development class			
38 m^{2} Skerry cruiser		Development class			
40 m^{2} Skerry cruiser		Development class			
45 m^{2} Skerry cruiser		Development class			
5 Metre		Development class			
55 m^{2} Skerry cruiser		Development class			
6.5 Metre		Development class			
7 Metre		Development class			
75 m^{2} Skerry cruiser		Development class			
9 Metre		Development class			
95 m^{2} Skerry cruiser		Development class			
Abbott 33	1981	Jan Torben Larsen and Abbott Boats	Abbott Boats		
AC75	2019	Development class			
Accent 26	1975	Peter Norlin	Albin Marine; Shipman Sweden AB		
Achilles 24	1968	Oliver Lee and Chris Butler	Butler Moldings		
Aero 20	1999	Gary Mull	Catalina Yachts		
Alacrity 19	1969	Peter Stevenson	Hurley Marine; Russell Marine		
Alajuela 33	1977	Raymond Richards	Alajuela Yacht Corp		
Alajuela 38	1977	William Atkin	Alajuela Yacht Corp		
Alberg 22	1970	Carl Alberg	Nye Yachts		
Alberg 29	1976	Carl Alberg	Nye Yachts		
Alberg 30	1962	Carl Alberg			
Alberg 37	1967	Carl Alberg			
Alberg Odyssey 30	1960	Carl Alberg			
Albin 7.8	1976	Peter Norlin	Albin Marine		
Albin 57	1977	Rolf Magnusson	Albin Marine		
Albin 79	1974	Rolf Magnusson	Albin Marine		
Albin 82 MS	1975	Per Brohäll	Albin Marine		
Albin Express	1979	Peter Norlin	Albin Marine		
Albin Vega	1966	Per Brohäll	Albin Marine		
Alden 44	1976	Neils Helleberg	Alden Yachts		
Alerion Express 19	1998	Gary Hoyt	TPI Composites		
Alerion Express 28	1990	Carl Schumacher	Holby Marine; Tillotson Pearson; Alerion Yachts		
Alize 20	1963	E. G. van de Stadt	Jeanneau		
Allmand 31	1978	Walter Scott	Allmand Boats		
Aloha 8.5	1976	Edward S. Brewer	Ouyang Boat Works		
Aloha 27	1976	Robert Perry	Ouyang Boat Works		
Aloha 28	1972	Edward S. Brewer; Robert Walstrom	Ouyang Boat Works		
Aloha 30	1986	Ron Holland	Ouyang Boat Works		
Aloha 32	1978	Mark Ellis	Ouyang Boat Works		
Aloha 34	1975	Edward S. Brewer; Robert Walstrom	Ouyang Boat Works		
Alpha 29	1984	Peter Norlin	Albin Marine		
AMF 2100	1980	Ted Hood	AMF, Inc		
Amphibi-Con 25	1954	E. Farnham Butler and Cyrus Hamlin	Mount Desert Yachts; Sailstar Boats; Burr Brothers Boats		
Andunge	1947	Thorwald Gjerdum			
Annie 30	1980	Chuck Paine	Morris Yachts		
Antares 17	1987		Sovereign Yachts		
Antrim 20	1981	Jim Antrim	Antrim Marine		
Aquarius 21	1969	Peter Barrett	Coastal Recreation Inc.		
Aquarius 23	1969	Peter Barrett & Stan Miller	Coastal Recreation Inc.		
Aquarius 24 Pilot Cutter	1979	Frank Parish	Top Sail Yachts Inc.		
Aquila 27	1975	Philippe Harlé	Jeanneau		
Archambault A13	2014	Joubert Nivelt Design	Archambault Boats		
Archambault A27	2012	Joubert Nivelt Design	Archambault Boats		
Archambault A31	2009	Joubert Nivelt Design	Archambault Boats		
Archambault A35	2006	Joubert Nivelt Design	Archambault Boats		
Archambault A35	2014	Joubert Nivelt Design	Archambault Boats		
Archambault A40	2004	Joubert Nivelt Design	Archambault Boats		
Archambault A40RC	2003	Joubert Nivelt Design	Archambault Boats		
Archambault Bagheera	1968		Archambault Boats		
Archambault Coco	1985	Harlé - Mortain	Archambault Boats		
Archambault Grand Surprise	1999	Joubert Nivelt Design	Archambault Boats		
Arco 33	1958	Wirth Munroe	Crystaliners		
Atlante (keelboat)	1965	Georges Auzepy-Brenneur	Chantier Mallard; Archambault Boats		
Atlantic 44	1990	Daniel Andrieu	Jeanneau		
Atlantic City catboat	1980	D. Martin	Mark-O Custom Boats		
Attalia 32	1962	Joubert-Nivelt	Jeanneau		
Aura A35	1975	Sparkman & Stephens	Aura Yachts		
Ballad 30	1971	Rolf Magnusson	Albin Marine		
Balboa 16	1981	W. Shad Turner	Coastal Recreation		
Balboa 20	1967	Lyle C. Hess	Arthur Marine; Coastal Recreation, Inc.		
Balboa 22	1977	W. Shad Turner & William Downing	Coastal Recreation		
Balboa 24	1981	W. Shad Turner & William Downing	Coastal Recreation, Laguna Yachts		
Balboa 26	1969	Lyle C. Hess	Arthur Marine; Coastal Recreation, Inc.		
Balboa 27 8.2	1976	Lyle C. Hess	Coastal Recreation, Inc.		
Baltic 37	1978	Robert W. Ball	Baltic Yachts		
Baltic 40	1988	Judel/Vrolijk & Co.	Baltic Yachts		
Banner 32	1982	Stan Huntingford	Cooper Enterprises		
Banner 37	1982	Stan Huntingford	Cooper Enterprises		
Bayfield 25	1975	Ted Gozzard	Bayfield Boat Yard		
Bayfield 29	1978	Ted Gozzard	Bayfield Boat Yard		
Bayfield 30/32	1973	Ted Gozzard	Bayfield Boat Yard		
Bayfield 36	1984	Hayden Gozzard	Bayfield Boat Yard		
Bayfield 40	1982	Ted Gozzard	Bayfield Boat Yard		
Bay Hen 21	1984	Reuben Trane	Florida Bay Boat Company		
B-32	1995	Leif Beiley	B Boats		
BB 10	1977	Børge Børresen	Børresens		
BB 11	1956	B. Bringsværd			
BB 17					
Beachcomber 25	1979	Walter Scott	Marine Innovations		
Bahama 30	1973	Bob Finch	Islander Yachts		
Bahia 22	1983	Philippe H. Harlé	Jeanneau		
Bermuda 40	1958	William Tripp Jr	Hinckley Yachts		
Bianca 27	1964	Christensen	Christensen		
Bluenose one-design sloop	1946	William James Roué	Bayliner		
Blazer 23	1988	Bruce Kirby	Ontario Yachts		
Blue Chip 30	1961	A. Sidney DeWolf Herreshoff	Cape Cod Shipbuilding		
Blue Water 24	1961	Thomas C. Gillmer	Blue Water Boats		
Bombardier 7.6	1980	Ron Holland	Bombardier Limited		
Bremer 25	1995	Mark Bremer	CW Hood Yachts/Bremer Marine		
Brick (keelboat)	1964	Jean-Jacques Herbulot	Chantier Mallard; Archambault Boats		
Bridges Point 24	1985	Joel White	Bridges Point Boatyard; Bridges Point Boat Company		
Bristol 29.9	1977	Halsey Chase Herreshoff	Bristol Yachts		
Bristol 39	1966	Ted Hood	Bristol Yachts		
Bristol 40	1970	Ted Hood	Bristol Yachts		
Bristol Caravel 22	1968	Halsey Chase Herreshoff	Sailstar Boat Co. Bristol Yachts		
Bristol Channel Cutter	1976	Lyle C. Hess	Sam L. Morse Co. Cape George Marine Works; Channel Cutter Yachts		
Bristol Corsair 24	1964	Paul Coble	Sailstar Boat Co. Bristol Yachts		
Buccaneer 200	1974	Alan Payne	Bayliner		
Buccaneer 210	1974	Alan Payne	Bayliner		
Buccaneer 220	1978	Gary Mull	Buccaneer Yachts/US Yachts		
Buccaneer 240	1975		Buccaneer Yachts		
Buccaneer 245	1975		Buccaneer Yachts		
Buccaneer 250	1978	Gary Mull	Buccaneer Yachts/US Yachts		
Buzzards Bay 14	1940	L. Francis Herreshoff	Buzzards Bay Boat Shop; Artisan Boatworks		
Cal 20	1961	William Lapworth	Jensen Marine		
Cal 21	1969	William Lapworth	Jensen Marine		
Cal 22	1984	C. R. Hunt Associates	Jensen Marine		
Cal 24	1958	William Lapworth	Jensen Marine		
Cal 2-24	1967	William Lapworth	Jensen Marine		
Cal 3-24	1983	C. Raymond Hunt Associates	Jensen Marine		
Cal 25	1965	William Lapworth	Jensen Marine		
Cal 2-25	1977	William Lapworth	Cal Yachts		
Cal 27	1971	William Lapworth	Jensen Marine		
Cal 2-27	1974	William Lapworth	Jensen Marine		
Cal 3-27	1974	William Lapworth	Jensen Marine		
Cal 28	1963	William Lapworth	Jensen Marine		
Cal 29	1971	William Lapworth	Jensen Marine		
Cal 35	1979	William Lapworth	Cal Yachts		
Cal 35 Cruise	1973	William Lapworth	Cal Yachts		
Cal 39	1970	William Lapworth	Cal Yachts		
Cal 39 Mark II	1978	William Lapworth	Cal Yachts		
Cal 39 (Hunt/O'Day)	1988	C. Raymond Hunt and Associates	Cal Yachts & O'Day Corp		
Cal 40	1963	William Lapworth	Jensen Marine		
Cal 9.2	1981	Ron Holland	Jensen Marine		
Cal T/4	1971	William Lapworth	Cal Yachts		
C&C 1/2 Ton	1975	Robert W. Ball	C&C Yachts		
C&C 3/4 Ton	1974	Robert W. Ball	C&C Yachts		
C&C 25	1973	Cuthbertson & Cassian	C&C Yachts		
C&C 26	1976	Cuthbertson & Cassian	C&C Yachts		
C&C 27	1970	Robert W. Ball	C&C Yachts		
C&C 27 Mk V	1984	Robert W. Ball	C&C Yachts		
C&C 29	1977	Cuthbertson & Cassian	C&C Yachts		
C&C 29-2	1983	Cuthbertson & Cassian	C&C Yachts		
C&C 30	1973	Cuthbertson & Cassian	C&C Yachts		
C&C Corvette 31	1966	Cuthbertson & Cassian	C&C Yachts		
C&C 32	1981	Cuthbertson & Cassian	C&C Yachts		
C&C 33	1974	Cuthbertson & Cassian	C&C Yachts		
C&C 34	1977	Robert W. Ball	C&C Yachts		
C&C 34/36	1989	Robert W. Ball	C&C Yachts		
C&C 35	1969	Cuthbertson & Cassian	C&C Yachts		
C&C Frigate 36	1968	Cuthbertson & Cassian	C&C Yachts		
C&C Invader 36	1965	Cuthbertson & Cassian	C&C Yachts		
C&C 36-1	1977	Cuthbertson & Cassian	C&C Yachts		
C&C 36R	1971	Cuthbertson & Cassian	C&C Yachts		
C&C 37	1981	Robert W. Ball	C&C Yachts		
C&C 38	1973	C&C Design	C&C Yachts		
C&C 39	1971	C&C Design	C&C Yachts		
C&C 40	1968	C&C Design	C&C Yachts		
C&C 37/40	1988	Robert W. Ball	C&C Yachts		
C&C 41	1981	Robert W. Ball	C&C Yachts		
C&C 42 Custom	1976	C&C Design	C&C Yachts		
C&C 43-1	1971	C&C Design	C&C Yachts		
C&C 43-2	1980	C&C Design	C&C Yachts		
C&C 44	1985	Robert W. Ball	C&C Yachts		
C&C 45	2000	William Tripp III	C&C Yachts		
C&C 46	1973	C&C Design	C&C Yachts		
C&C 48 Custom	1973	C&C Design	C&C Yachts		
C&C 50	1972	C&C Design	C&C Yachts		
C&C 51 Custom	1986	Robert W. Ball	C&C Yachts		
C&C 52 Custom	1978	Robert W. Ball	C&C Yachts		
C&C 53	1976	Robert W. Ball	C&C Yachts		
C&C 57	1989	Robert W. Ball	C&C Yachts		
C&C 61	1971	C&C Design	C&C Yachts		
C&C Custom 62	1982	C&C Design	C&C Yachts		
C&C 99	2002	Tim Jackett	C&C Yachts		
C&C 101	2012	Tim Jackett	C&C Yachts		
C&C 110	1999	Tim Jackett	C&C Yachts		
C&C 115	2005	Tim Jackett	C&C Yachts		
C&C 121	1999	Tim Jackett	C&C Yachts		
C&C 131	2008	Tim Jackett	C&C Yachts		
C&C Landfall 35	1979	Robert W. Ball	C&C Yachts		
C&C Landfall 38	1979	Robert W. Ball	C&C Yachts		
C&C Landfall 39	1985	C&C Design & Robert Perry	C&C Yachts		
C&C Landfall 42	1976	C&C Design	C&C Yachts		
C&C Landfall 43	1982	C&C Design	C&C Yachts		
C&C Landfall 48	1980	C&C Design	C&C Yachts		
C&C Mega 30 One Design	1977	Peter Barrett (sailor)	C&C Yachts		
C&C SR 21	1992	Glenn Henderson	C&C Yachts		
C&C SR 25	1996	Glenn Henderson	C&C Yachts		
C&C SR 27	1992	Glenn Henderson	C&C Yachts		
C&C SR 33	1992	Glenn Henderson	C&C Yachts		
CAP 450	1986		Jeanneau		
Cape 31	2017	Mark Mills	Cape Performance Sailing		
Cape Cod Cat	1971	Charles Whittholz	Cape Cod Shipbuilding		
Cape Cod Mercury 15	1940	Sparkman and Stephens	Cape Cod Shipbuilding		
Cape Dory 22	1981	Carl Alberg	Cape Dory Yachts		
Cape Dory 25	1973	George H. Stadel	Cape Dory Yachts		
Cape Dory 25D	1981	Carl Alberg	Cape Dory Yachts		
Cape Dory 33	1980	Carl Alberg	Cape Dory Yachts		
Cape Dory 330	1985	Carl Alberg	Cape Dory Yachts		
Capri 14	1960	Barney Lehman; W. D. Schock	W. D. Schock Corp		
Capri 16	1984	Frank Butler	Catalina Yachts		
Capri 22	1984	Gary Mull and Frank Butler	Catalina Yachts		
Capri 26	1990	Gerry Douglas and Frank Butler	Catalina Yachts		
Caliber 40	1992	Michael McCreary	Caliber Yachts		
Capri 25	1980	Frank Butler	Catalina Yachts		
Captiva 35	1981	Walter Scott	Captiva Yachts		
Captiva 240	1984	O.H. Rodgers and Walter Scott	Captiva Yachts		
Catalina 18	1985	Frank V. Butler and Gerry Douglas	Catalina Yachts		
Catalina 22	1969	Frank V. Butler	Catalina Yachts		
Catalina 25	1978	Frank V. Butler	Catalina Yachts		
Catalina 30	1972	Frank V. Butler	Catalina Yachts		
Catalina 34	1985	Gerry Douglas	Catalina Yachts		
Catalina 36	1982	Frank Butler/Gerry Douglas	Catalina Yachts		
Catalina 38	1978	Sparkman & Stephens	Catalina Yachts		
Catalina 250	1995	Catalina Yachts	Catalina Yachts		
Catalina 270	1992	Gerry Douglas	Catalina Yachts		
Catalina 275 Sport	2013	Gerry Douglas	Catalina Yachts		
Catalina 309	2010	Gerry Douglas	Catalina Yachts		
Catalina 310	1999	Gerry Douglas	Catalina Yachts		
Catalina 320	1993	Gerry Douglas	Catalina Yachts		
Catalina 375	2008	Gerry Douglas	Catalina Yachts		
Catalina 470	1998	Gerry Douglas	Catalina Yachts		
Challenger 24	1973	Alex McGruer	Challenger Yachts		
Chaser 29	1975	Doug Peterson	Chaser Yachts		
Chico 30	1970	Gary Mull	Keith Eade		
Chrysler 20	1977	Halsey Herreshoff	Chrysler Marine		
Chrysler 22	1975	Halsey Herreshoff	Chrysler Marine		
Chrysler 26	1977	Halsey Herreshoff	Chrysler Marine		
Classe Mini	1976	Development class			
Classic 22	1962	George Harding Cuthbertson	Grampian Marine		
Classic 22 (Windley)	1989	Stuart Windley	Classic Yachts		
Classic 26	1991	W. Shad Turner	Classic Yachts		
Classic 33	1995	W. Shad Turner	Classic Yachts		
Clipper 21	1971	William Crealock	Clipper Marine		
Clipper 23	1976	William Crealock	Clipper Marine; Sawyer Marine		
ClubSwan 36	2018	Juan Kouyoumdjian	Nautor's Swan		
ClubSwan 42	2005	Germán Frers	Nautor's Swan		
ClubSwan 43	2024	Germán Frers	Nautor's Swan		
ClubSwan 80	2022	Juan Kouyoumdjian	Nautor's Swan		
ClubSwan 125	2021	Juan Kouyoumdjian	Nautor's Swan		
Coast 34	1980	Bruce Roberts and Grahame Shannon	Clearwater Marine, Cape Marine, Windward Marine		
Colgate 26	1996	Jim Taylor Yacht Designs	Precision Boat Works		
Columbia 7.6	1976	Alan Payne	Columbia Yachts; Hughes Boat Works; Aura Yachts		
Columbia 8.3	1976	Alan Payne	Columbia Yachts; Hughes Boat Works; Aura Yachts		
Columbia 8.7	1976	Alan Payne	Columbia Yachts; Hughes Boat Works; Aura Yachts		
Columbia 22	1966	William Crealock	Columbia Yachts		
Columbia 24	1962	Joseph McGlasson	Columbia Yachts		
Columbia 24 Challenger	1962	Joseph McGlasson	Columbia Yachts		
Columbia 24 Contender	1963	Joseph McGlasson/Columbia Yachts	Columbia Yachts		
Columbia 32	1975	William H. Tripp Jr.	Columbia Yachts		
Columbia 34	1966	Wirth Monroe and Richard Valdez	Columbia Yachts		
Columbia 34 Mark II	1970	William H. Tripp Jr.	Columbia Yachts		
Columbia 36	1967	William Crealock	Columbia Yachts		
Columbia 38	1965	Charley Morgan	Columbia Yachts		
Columbia 40	1964	Charley Morgan	Columbia Yachts		
Com-Pac 16	1972	Clark Mills	Com-Pac Yachts		
Com-Pac 19	1979	Robert K. Johnson	Com-Pac Yachts		
Com-Pac 23	1978	Clark Mills	Com-Pac Yachts		
Com-Pac 25	1979	Hutchins Group	Com-Pac Yachts		
Com-Pac Eclipse	2004	Hutchins Group	Com-Pac Yachts		
Com-Pac Horizon Cat	2002	Halsey Herreshoff	Com-Pac Yachts		
Com-Pac Legacy	2006		Com-Pac Yachts		
Com-Pac Sun Cat	2000	Clark Mills	Com-Pac Yachts		
Com-Pac Sunday Cat	2008	Clark Mills	Com-Pac Yachts		
Concept 40	1981	Gary Mull	Concept Yachts/Hyundai		
Contest 25 OC	1982	Jacques De Ridder	Contest Yachts/Conyplex		
Contest 29	1964	G. Luyten	Contest Yachts/Conyplex	247	
Contest 32 CS	1978	Dick Zaal	Contest Yachts/Conyplex		
Cooper 353	1979	Stan Huntingford	Cooper Enterprises		
Cooper 367	1984	Stan Huntingford	Cooper Enterprises		
Cooper 416	1978	Stan Huntingford	Cooper Enterprises		
Cooper 508	1981	Stan Huntingford	Cooper Enterprises		
Corbin 39	1979	Robert Dufour and Marius Corbin	Corbin Les Bateaux		
Core Sound 20 Mark 3	2014	B&B Yacht Designs	amateur construction		
Corinthian 19	1966	Carl Alberg	Sailstar Boats; Bristol Yachts		
Cornish Crabber 17	1989	Roger Dongray	Cornish Crabbers		
Cornish Crabber 24	1974	Roger Dongray	Cornish Crabbers		
Cornish Shrimper 19	1979	Roger Dongray	Cornish Crabbers		
Coronado 23	1969	William Crealock	Coronado Yachts		
Coronado 25	1966	Frank W. Butler	Coronado Yachts		
Coronado 35	1971	William H. Tripp Jr	Coronado Yachts		
Crealock 37	1978	William Crealock	Cruising Consultants Inc. Pacific Seacraft		
Creekmore 34	1977	Lee Creekmore	Creekmore Boats		
Crown 23	1969	William Lapworth	Calgan Marine		
Crown 28	1976	William Lapworth and Al Nairne	Calgan Marine		
Crown 34	1975	Hein Driehuyzen	Calgan Marine		
CS 22	1971	John Butler	CS Yachts		
CS 27	1975	Raymond Wall	CS Yachts		
CS 30	1984	Tony Castro	CS Yachts		
CS 33	1979	Raymond Wall	CS Yachts		
CS 34	1989	Tony Castro	CS Yachts		
CS 36	1978	Raymond Wall	CS Yachts		
CS 36 Merlin	1986	Tony Castro	CS Yachts		
CS 40	1987	Tony Castro	CS Yachts		
CS 44	1985	Tony Castro	CS Yachts		
CS 50	1987	Germán Frers	CS Yachts		
CS 395	1979	Germán Frers	CS Yachts		
Cumulus 28	1978	Peter Norlin	Albin Marine		
Cygnus 20	1963	George Hinterhoeller	Hinterhoeller Yachts		
Dana 24	1974	William Crealock	Pacific Seacraft		
D&M 22	1971	Sparkman and Stephens	Douglass & McLeod		
Dawson 26	1973	Robert Finch	Dawson Yacht Corp		
DB-1	1980	E. G. van de Stadt and Cees van Tongeren	Dehler Yachts		
DB-2	1981	E. G. van de Stadt and Cees van Tongeren	Dehler Yachts		
Dehler 22	1983	E. G. van de Stadt	Dehler Yachts		
Dehler 25	1984	E. G. van de Stadt	Dehler Yachts		
Delta 31	1983	Peter Norlin	Albin Marine		
Dickerson 37	1980	George Hazen	Dickerson Boatbuilders		
Dickerson 41	1973	Ernest Tucker	Dickerson Boatbuilders		
Dione 98	1970	Gary Mull	Nautiber SA		
Discovery 7.9	1975	Alex McGruer	Grampian Marine		
Dockrell 37	1968	Dockrell Yachts	Dockrell Yachts		
Dolphin 17	1970	Glen and Murray Corcoran	Universal Plastic Products; Silverline Boats		
Dolphin 24	1959	Sparkman & Stephens	O'Day Corp		
Douglas 32	1967	Ted Brewer	Douglas Marine Craft		
Drascombe Lugger	1968	John L. Watkinson	Honnar Marine		
DS-16	1970	G. Diller & H. Schwill	Diller-Schwill		
DS-22	1983	Bruce Kirby	Diller-Schwill		
DS 37 Match Racer	1991	Jacob Vierø			
Dufour 24	1975	Michel Dufour	Dufour Yachts		
Dufour 1800	1979	Laurent Cordelle and Michel Dufour	Dufour Yachts		
Eagle 38	2019	Hoek Design	Leonardo Yachts		
Eastsail 25	1984	Eliot Spalding	Eastsail Yachts		
Eastward Ho 24	1975	Walter McInnis	Portsmouth Yachts		
Eclipse 6.7	1978	Carl Alberg	South Coast Seacraft		
Edel 540	1974	Maurice Edel	Construction Nautic Edel		
Edel 665	1975	Maurice Edel	Construction Nautic Edel		
Elite 25	2014	Joubert Nivelt Design	Kirié		
Elvstrøm 717	1976	Paul Elvstrøm	Nordship		
Endeavor 26	1963	William Lapworth	W. D. Schock Corp		
Endeavour 33	1983	Bruce Kelley	Endeavour Yacht Corp.		
Endeavour 37	1977	Dennis Robbins	Endeavour Yacht Corp.		
Endeavour 40	1977	Bob Johnson	Endeavour Yacht Corp.		
Ensenada 20	1972	Lyle C. Hess	Coastal Recreation, Inc.		
Eolia 25	1983	Philippe Briand	Jeanneau		
Ericson 23-1	1969	Bruce King	Ericson Yachts		
Ericson 23-2	1975	Bruce King	Ericson Yachts		
Ericson 25	1973	Bruce King	Ericson Yachts		
Ericson 25+	1978	Bruce King	Ericson Yachts		
Ericson 29	1970	Bruce King	Ericson Yachts		
Ericson 36	1969	Ron Holland	Ericson Yachts		
Espace 620	1983	Jeanneau Design Office	Jeanneau		
Espace 800	1981	Philippe Briand	Jeanneau		
Espace 990	1985	Philippe Briand	Jeanneau		
Espace 1000	1980	Philippe Briand	Jeanneau		
Espace 1100	1985	Philippe Briand	Jeanneau		
Espace 1300	1981	Philippe Briand	Jeanneau		
ETAP 20	1975	E. G. van de Stadt	ETAP Yachting		
ETAP 21i	1997	Mortain & Mavrikios	ETAP Yachting		
ETAP 22	1974	E. G. van de Stadt	ETAP Yachting		
ETAP 22i	1983	Jacques de Ridder	ETAP Yachting		
ETAP 23	1982	Jacques de Ridder	ETAP Yachting		
ETAP 23i	1982	Jacques de Ridder	ETAP Yachting		
ETAP 23iL	1994	Jacques de Ridder	ETAP Yachting		
ETAP 24i	1999	Marc-Oliver von Ahlen	ETAP Yachting		
ETAP 26	1982	E. G. van de Stadt	ETAP Yachting		
ETAP 26i	1994	Mortain & Mavrikios	ETAP Yachting		
ETAP 26s	2005	Marc-Oliver von Ahlen	ETAP Yachting		
ETAP 28	1978	E. G. van de Stadt	ETAP Yachting		
ETAP 28i	1988	Harlé-Mortain	ETAP Yachting		
ETAP 28s	2007	Marc-Oliver von Ahlen	ETAP Yachting		
ETAP 30	1985	Jacques de Ridder	ETAP Yachting		
ETAP 30cq	2010	Marc-Oliver von Ahlen	ETAP Yachting		
ETAP 30i	1995	Mortain & Mavrikios	ETAP Yachting		
ETAP 32i	1992	Harlé-Mortain	ETAP Yachting		
ETAP 32s	2003	Mortain & Mavrikios	ETAP Yachting		
ETAP 34s	1997	Mortain & Mavrikios	ETAP Yachting		
ETAP 35i	1992		ETAP Yachting		
ETAP 37s	2003	Mortain & Mavrikios	ETAP Yachting		
ETAP 38i	1989	Mortain & Mavrikios	ETAP Yachting		
ETAP 39s	1999	J&J Design	ETAP Yachting		
ETAP 48Ds	2009	Marc-Oliver von Ahlen	ETAP Yachting		
Evelyn 25	1984	Bob Evelyn	Formula Yachts		
Express 27	1982	Carl Schumacher	Alsberg Brothers Boatworks		
Express 34	1986	Carl Schumacher	Alsberg Brothers Boatworks		
Express 35	1984	Steve Killing	Goman Boat		
Express 37	1984	Carl Schumacher	Alsberg Brothers Boatworks		
Falmouth Cutter 22	1980	Lyle C. Hess	Cape George Marine Works, Sam L. Morse Co.		
Falmouth Cutter 26		Lyle C. Hess	Russell Yachts		
Falmouth Cutter 34	1982	Lyle C. Hess	Channel Cutter Yachts		
Fantasia 27	1981	Philippe H. Harlé	Jeanneau		
Fantasia 37	1984	Philippe H. Harlé	Jeanneau		
Fareast 18R	2013	Simonis & Voogd	Far East		
Farr 38	1978	Bruce Farr	Spindrift Yacht Inc; Marina Bracuhy		
Farr 727	1976	Bruce Farr	Alpha Marine; Chantier Mallard; North Star Yachts		
Fish Class	1916	Nathanael Greene Herreshoff	Herreshoff Manufacturing Co.	United States	
Fisher 25	1974	Wyatt and Freeman	Fairways Marine; Northshore Yachts; Fisher Boat Company; Fisher Yachts International		
Flicka 20	1974	Bruce Bingham	Nor'Star Fiberglass Yachts, Pacific Seacraft		
Flying Tiger 7.5	2009	Robert Perry	Hansheng Yachtbuilding		
Flying Tiger 10 M	2005	Robert Perry	Hansheng Yachtbuilding		
Fortune 30	1974	Stan Huntingford	Cooper Enterprises		
Freedom 21	1982	Gary Hoyt	Freedom Yachts		
Freedom 24	1994	William H. Tripp, III	Freedom Yachts		
Freedom 25	1980	Gary Hoyt	Freedom Yachts		
Freedom 28	1986	Gary Mull	Freedom Yachts		
Freedom 28 Cat Ketch	1979	Gary Hoyt and Jay Paris	Freedom Yachts		
Freedom 30	1986	Gary Mull	Freedom Yachts		
Freedom 35	1993	David Pedrick	Freedom Yachts		
Freedom 36	1985	Gary Mull	Freedom Yachts		
Freedom 36 Cat Ketch	1985	Gary Mull	Freedom Yachts		
Freedom 38	1989	Gary Mull	Freedom Yachts		
Freedom 39	1983	Ron Holland and Gary Hoyt	Freedom Yachts		
Freedom 39 PH	1983	Ron Holland and Gary Hoyt	Freedom Yachts		
Freedom 42	1987	Gary Mull	Freedom Yachts		
Freedom 45	1987	Gary Mull and Jim P. Donovan	Freedom Yachts		
Fun 23	1982	Joubert-Nivelt	Jeanneau, Ranger Yachts, Cantiere Nautico Lillia		
G&S 27	1986	Graham & Schlageter			
G&S 30	1979	Graham & Schlageter	Shea Marine		
Gin Fizz 37	1974	Michel Joubert	Jeanneau		
Gladiator 24	1958	William Lapworth	Continental Plastics Inc.		
Gloucester 18 (Whitecap)	c. 1974	Harry R. Sindle	Lockley-Newport Boats; Gloucester Yachts		
Gloucester 19	1983	Stuart Windley & Harry R. Sindle	Gloucester Yachts		
Gloucester 20	1981	Stuart Windley & Harry R. Sindle	Gloucester Yachts		
Gloucester 22	1983	Stuart Windley & Harry R. Sindle	Gloucester Yachts		
Gloucester 27	1983	Stuart Windley & Harry R. Sindle	Gloucester Yachts		
Goderich 35	1977	Ted Brewer	Huromic Metal Industries Limited		
Golif 21	1961	P. Jouët & Cie	Jouët		
Grampian 23	1971	Alex McGruer	Grampian Marine		
Grampian 26	1967	Alex McGruer	Grampian Marine		
Grampian 28	1975	Rolf van der Sleen	Grampian Marine		
Grampian 30	1969	Alex McGruer	Grampian Marine		
Ganbare 35	1973	Doug Peterson	Cooper Enterprises; Martin Yachts		
GKSS-eka	1949	Einar Ohlson & Carl-Eric Ohlson			
Gulf 27	1970	Capital Yachts	Capital Yachts		
Gulf 29	1982	Capital Yachts	Capital Yachts		
Gulf 32	1965	William Garden	Capital Yachts		
Gulf 39	1971	Capital Yachts	Capital Yachts		
Gulfstar 43	1971	Vince & Richard Lazarra	Gulfstar Yachts		
Hai	1930				
Halcyon 23	1967	Alan Buchanan	Offshore Yachts Limited		
Halman 20	1977		Halman Manufacturing		
Halman Horizon	1982	Michael Volmer	Halman Manufacturing		
Hans Christian 33	1980	Harwood Ives	Hans Christian Yachts		
Harbor 14	2004	Barney Lehman; W. D. Schock	W. D. Schock Corp		
Harbor 20	1997	Steve Schock	W. D. Schock Corp; One Design Composites		
Harbor 25	2007	Steve Schock	W. D. Schock Corp		
Harbor 30	2012	Steve Schock	W. D. Schock Corp		
Harmony 22	1977	Chris Bjerregaard	Harmony Yachts; Gloucester Yachts		
Harpoon 6.2	1979	C&C Design	Boston Whaler		
Hartley TS16	1956	Richard Hartley	Hartley Boat Plans		
Helms 24	1977	Stuart Windley	Jack A. Helms Co.		
Helsen 20	1974	Johannes "Jopie" Helsen	Universal Marine		
Helsen 22	1971	Johannes "Jopie" Helsen	Universal Marine		
Heritage 20	1967	Andras Davidhazy	Howie Craft Plastics		
Heritage 35	1974	McCurdy & Rhodes	Heritage Yacht Builders		
Hermann 19	1963	Richard P. Ketcham Jr.	Ted Hermann's Boat Shop		
Hermann 22	1961	Richard P. Ketcham Jr.	Ted Hermann's Boat Shop		
Herreshoff 12½ft	1914	Nathanael Greene Herreshoff	Herreshoff Manufacturing Co.	United States	
Herreshoff H-26		Gordon Goodwin, Sidney Herreshoff and Halsey Chase Herreshoff	Cape Cod Shipbuilding	United States	
Herreshoff 31	1979	Halsey Chase Herreshoff	Cat Ketch Corp.	United States	
Herreshoff America	1971	Halsey Chase Herreshoff	Nowak & Williams; Squadron Yachts; Nauset Marine		
Herreshoff Bull's Eye	1914	Nathanael Greene Herreshoff	Herreshoff Manufacturing Company, Quincy Adams Yacht Yard, Cape Cod Shipbuilding	United States	
Herreshoff Eagle	1976	Halsey Chase Herreshoff	Nowak & Williams; Squadron Yachts; Nauset Marine; Tillotson-Pearson		
Herreshoff Goldeneye	1959	Nathanael Greene Herreshoff; A. Sidney DeWolf Herreshoff	Cape Cod Shipbuilding		
Herreshoff Prudence	1937	L. Francis Herreshoff	Middleton Marine		
Herreshoff Rozinante	1952	L. Francis Herreshoff	South Coast Seacraft; Kenner Boat Company; Artisan Boatworks		
Hinckley 38	1968	Sparkman & Stephens	Hughes Boat Works; Hinckley Yachts		
Hinckley 42 Competition	1982	McCurdy & Rhodes	Hinckley Yachts		
Hinckley 43 (Hood)	1976	Ted Hood	Hinckley Yachts		
Hinckley 43 (Hood)-2	1979	Ted Hood	Hinckley Yachts		
Hinckley 43 (McCurdy & Rhodes)	1990	McCurdy & Rhodes	Hinckley Yachts		
Hilbre One Design	1958	Alan Buchanan			
Hinterhoeller F3	1981	German Frers	Hinterhoeller Yachts		
Hobie 33	1982	Hobie Alter and Phil Edwards	Hobie Cat		
Holder 17	1982	Ron Holder	Holder Marine; Hobie Cat		
Holder 20	1980	Ron Holder and Dave Ulmann	Vagabond Sailboats; Hobie Cat		
Hotfoot 27	1981	Doug Hemphill	Hotfoot Boats	Canada	
Howth 17	1898	W. Herbert Boyd		Ireland	
Hughes 22	1971	Howard Hughes	Hughes Boat Works		
Hughes 24	1966	William Shaw	Hughes Boat Works		
Hughes 25	1968	Howard Hughes	Hughes Boat Works		
Hughes 29	1975	Howard Hughes	Hughes Boat Works		
Hughes 31	1976	Sparkman & Stephens	Hughes Boat Works		
Hughes 35	1973	Sparkman & Stephens	Hughes Boat Works		
Hughes 36	1971	William H. Tripp Jr	Hughes Boat Works		
Hughes 38-1	1967	Sparkman & Stephens	Hughes Boat Works		
Hughes 38-2	1970	Sparkman & Stephens	Hughes Boat Works		
Hughes 38-3	1977	Sparkman & Stephens	Hughes Boat Works		
Hughes 48	1970	Sparkman & Stephens	Hughes Boat Works		
Hughes-Columbia 27	1976	Alan Payne	Hughes Boat Works		
Hughes-Columbia 36	1979	William H. Tripp Jr	Hughes Boat Works		
Hullmaster 27	1974	Edward S. Brewer and Robert Walstrom	Hullmaster Boats/DS Yachts		
Humboldt 30	1982	Gary Mull	Humboldt Bay Yachts		
Hunter 19 (Europa)	1972	Oliver Lee	Hunter Boats Limited		
Hunter 19-1	1981	Hunter Design Team	Hunter Marine		
Hunter 19-2	1993	Hunter Design Team	Hunter Marine		
Hunter 20	1983	Cortland Steck	Hunter Marine		
Hunter 22	1981	Hunter Design Team	Hunter Marine		
Hunter 23	1985	Hunter Design Team	Hunter Marine		
Hunter 23.5	1993	Hunter Design Team	Hunter Marine		
Hunter 25	1972	John Cherubini; Bob Seidelmann	Hunter Marine		
Hunter 25.5	1984	Cortland Steck	Hunter Marine		
Hunter 26	1994	Rob Mazza	Hunter Marine		
Hunter 27	1974	John Cherubini	Hunter Marine		
Hunter 27 Edge	2006	Hunter Design Team	Hunter Marine		
Hunter 28	1989		Hunter Marine		
Hunter 28.5	1985	Hunter Design Team	Hunter Marine		
Hunter 29.5	1994	Rob Mazza	Hunter Marine		
Hunter 30	1973	John Cherubini	Hunter Marine		
Hunter 30-2	1988		Hunter Marine		
Hunter 30T	1991		Hunter Marine		
Hunter 31	1983	Cortland Steck	Hunter Marine		
Hunter 31-2	1983	Hunter Design Team	Hunter Marine		
Hunter 32 Vision	1988		Hunter Marine		
Hunter 33	1977	John Cherubini	Hunter Marine		
Hunter 33-2004	2004	Glenn Henderson	Hunter Marine		
Hunter 33.5	1987		Hunter Marine		
Hunter 34	1983	Cortland Steck	Hunter Marine		
Hunter 35 Legend	1986		Hunter Marine		
Hunter 35.5 Legend	1989		Hunter Marine		
Hunter 36	1980	John Cherubini	Hunter Marine		
Hunter 36-2	2008	Glenn Henderson	Hunter Marine		
Hunter 36 Legend	2001	Glenn Henderson	Hunter Marine		
Hunter 36 Vision	1995		Hunter Marine		
Hunter 37	1978	John Cherubini	Hunter Marine		
Hunter 37 Legend	1986	Warren Luhrs	Hunter Marine		
Hunter 37.5 Legend	1990	Hunter Design Group	Hunter Marine		
Hunter 38	2004	Glenn Henderson	Hunter Marine		
Hunter 39	2009	Glenn Henderson	Hunter Marine		
Hunter 40	1984	Cortland Steck	Hunter Marine		
Hunter 40.5	1991	Hunter Design Team	Hunter Marine		
Hunter 41	2004	Glenn Henderson	Hunter Marine		
Hunter 43 Legend	1989	Hunter Design Team	Hunter Marine		
Hunter 44	2003	Glenn Henderson	Hunter Marine		
Hunter 45	1985	Glenn Henderson	Hunter Marine		
Hunter 45 DS	2006	Glenn Henderson	Hunter Marine		
Hunter 49	2007	Glenn Henderson & Hunter Design Team	Hunter Marine		
Hunter HC 50	2000	Hunter Design Team	Hunter Marine		
Hunter 54	1980	Warren Luhrs, John Cherubini, Cortland Steck	Hunter Marine		
Hunter 212	1996	Chuck Burns	Hunter Marine		
Hunter 216	2003	Glenn Henderson	Hunter Marine		
Hunter 260	1997	Rob Mazza and the Hunter Design Team	Hunter Marine		
Hunter 270	2000		Hunter Marine		
Hunter 280	1995	Hunter Design Team and Rob Mazza	Hunter Marine		
Hunter 290	1999	Hunter Design Team	Hunter Marine		
Hunter 306	2001		Hunter Marine		
Hunter 326	2001	Glenn Henderson	Hunter Marine		
Hunter 333	1989		Hunter Marine		
Hunter 336	1995	Rob Mazza	Hunter Marine		
Hunter 340	1997	Hunter Design Team	Hunter Marine		
Hunter 356	2000	Glenn Henderson	Hunter Marine		
Hunter 376	1996	Hunter Design Team	Hunter Marine		
Hunter 380	1999	Hunter Design Team	Hunter Marine		
Hunter 386	1999	Hunter Design Team	Hunter Marine		
Hunter 410	1998	Hunter Design Team	Hunter Marine		
Hunter 420	1998	Hunter Design Team	Hunter Marine		
Hunter 426	2003	Glenn Henderson	Hunter Marine		
Hunter 430	1995	Hunter Design Team	Hunter Marine		
Hunter 456	2003	Hunter Design Team	Hunter Marine		
Hunter 460	1999	Hunter Design Team	Hunter Marine		
Hunter 466	2002	Hunter Design Team	Hunter Marine		
Hunter Passage 42	1989	Hunter Design Team	Hunter Marine		
Hunter Passage 450	1996	Hunter Design Team	Hunter Marine		
Ideal 18	1989	Bruce Kirby	Ontario Yachts; Shumway Marine		
Independence 20	1999	Gary Mull	Freedom Yachts and Catalina Yachts		
IF-boat	1967	Tord Sundén	Marieholms Bruk		
Imperial 23	1966	L. Wakefield	Russell Marine		
Impulse 21	1986	William E. Cook	Impulse Marine; Johnson Boatworks		
International 50	1994	Bruce Farr	Jeanneau		
International 110	1939	C. Raymond Hunt	Cape Cod Shipbuilding; W. D. Schock Corp; George Lawley & Son; Graves Yacht Yard; New Holland Marine Group		
International 210	1946	C. Raymond Hunt	Pearson Yachts; Graves Yacht Yard; Shaw Yacht, Inc.		
International 806 (Note: formerly known as Monark 806)	1974	Pelle Petterson	Monark, OL Boats		
International America's Cup Class		Development class			
Intrepid 35	1983	McCurdy & Rhodes	Heritage Yacht Builders		
Irwin 10/4	1975	Ted Irwin and Walter Scott	Irwin Yachts		
Irwin 23	1968	Ted Irwin	Irwin Yachts		
Irwin 25	1969	Ted Irwin	Irwin Yachts		
Irwin 27	1967	Ted Irwin	Irwin Yachts		
Irwin 30 Citation	1977	Ted Irwin	Irwin Yachts		
Irwin 41	1982	Ted Irwin	Irwin Yachts		
Irwin 41 Citation	1982	Ted Irwin	Irwin Yachts		
Islander 21	1965	Joseph McGlasson	McGlasson Marine/Islander Yachts		
Islander 24	1961	Joseph McGlasson	McGlasson Marine/Islander Yachts		
Islander 24 Bahama	1964	Joseph McGlasson	McGlasson Marine/Islander Yachts		
Islander 36	1971	Alan Gurney	Islander Yachts		
Islander 40	1979	Doug Peterson	Islander Yachts		
Island Packet 27	1984	Robert K. Johnson	Island Packet Yachts		
Island Packet 29	1981	Robert K. Johnson	Island Packet Yachts		
Island Packet 35	1988	Robert K. Johnson	Island Packet Yachts		
J-Class	1930	Development class			
J 10		Hjalmar Olsson			
J/28	1986	Rod Johnstone	J Boats Tillotson Pearson		
J/32	1996	Rod Johnstone	J Boats Tillotson Pearson		
J/35	1983	Rod Johnstone	J Boats Tillotson Pearson		
Javelin 38	1959	William Tripp Jr	Seafarer Yachts		
Jeanneau Arcachonnais	1969		Jeanneau		
Jeanneau Beniguet	1970		Jeanneau		
Jeanneau Brin de Folie	1970	Jean Marie Finot; Philippe Harlé	Jeanneau		
Jeanneau Brio	1979	Philippe Harlé	Jeanneau		
Jeanneau Cape Breton	1970		Jeanneau		
Jeanneau Captain	1968		Jeanneau		
Jeanneau Flirt	1976	Jeanneau Design Office	Jeanneau		
Jeanneau Love Love	1971	Philippe Harlé	Jeanneau		
Jeanneau Poker	1972	Michel Joubert	Jeanneau		
Jeanneau Storm	1966	E. G. van de Stadt	Jeanneau		
Jeanneau Yachts 51	2015	Philippe Briand; Andrew Winch; Jeanneau Design Office	Jeanneau		
Jeanneau Yachts 53	2008	Philippe Briand	Jeanneau		
Jeanneau Yachts 54	2015	Philippe Briand; Andrew Winch; Jeanneau Design Office	Jeanneau		
Jeanneau Yachts 55	2023	Philippe Briand; Andrew Winch; Jeanneau Design Office	Jeanneau		
Jeanneau Yachts 57	2009	Philippe Briand; Vittorio Garroni; Jeanneau Design Office	Jeanneau		
Jeanneau Yachts 58	2016	Philippe Briand; Camillo Garroni; JF de Premorel; Jeanneau Design Office	Jeanneau		
Jeanneau Yachts 60	2021	Philippe Briand; Andrew Winch	Jeanneau		
Jeanneau Yachts 64	2015	Philippe Briand; Andrew Winch; Jeanneau Design Office	Jeanneau		
Jeanneau Yachts 65	2022	Philippe Briand; Andrew Winch; Jeanneau Design Office	Jeanneau		
JOD 24	1994	Daniel Andrieu	Jeanneau		
JOD 35	1991	Daniel Andrieu	Jeanneau		
Jouët 760	1982	Philippe Briand	Yachting France		
K 30					
K 6	1944	Einar Ohlson		Sweden	
Kalik 40	1979	Gary Mull	Kyung-Il Yacht		
Kalik 44	1980	Gary Mull	Jachtwerf Vennekens		
KDY 15 m^{2}					
Kaiser 25	1962	John R. Kaiser Sr.	Kaiser Yachts; Stowman Shipbuilding		
Kelt 7.6	1980	Jean Berret	Kelt Marine		
Kirby 25	1974	Bruce Kirby	Mirage Yachts		
Kirby 30	1981	Bruce Kirby	Mirage Yachts		
Kirby 36	1983	Bruce Kirby	Scorpio Yachts		
Kittiwake 23	1966	Carl Alberg	Kenner Boat Company; Ray Greene & Company; River City Sailcraft		
Knarr	1946	Erling Kristoffersen	Grimsøykilen Boat Yard; Kilen Boat Yard; Børresen Bådebyggeri; Bootswerft Schneidereit		
L 6					
Laguna 16	1984	W. Shad Turner	Laguna Yachts		
Laguna 18	1983	W. Shad Turner	Laguna Yachts		
Laguna 24S	1980	W. Shad Turner	Laguna Yachts		
Laguna 26	1982	W. Shad Turner	Laguna Yachts		
Laguna 30	1983	W. Shad Turner	Laguna Yachts		
Laguna 33	1986	W. Shad Turner	Laguna Yachts		
Laminex Pocket Rocket	1983	Gary Mull	Laminex Industries		
Amy Landfall 39	1974	Ron Amy	Sino American Yacht Industrial Company, Limited		
Lancer 25	1975	W. Shad Turner	Lancer Yacht Corp		
Lancer 25 Mark V	1983	W. Shad Turner	Lancer Yacht Corp		
Lancer 25 PS	1985	Herb David	Lancer Yacht Corp		
Lancer 27 PS	1983	Herb David	Lancer Yacht Corp		
Lancer 29 PS	1984	Herb David	Lancer Yacht Corp		
Lancer 28	1977	W. Shad Turner	Lancer Yacht Corp		
Lancer 28T Mark V	1982	W. Shad Turner	Lancer Yacht Corp		
Lancer 29 Mark III	1977	C&C Design	Lancer Yacht Corp		
Lancer 30 Mark II	1977	C&C Design	Lancer Yacht Corp		
Lancer 30 Mark III	1979	C&C Design	Lancer Yacht Corp		
Lancer 30 Mark IV	1978	C&C Design	Lancer Yacht Corp		
Lancer 36	1973	Bill Lee	Lancer Yacht Corp		
Lancer 36 FR	1982	Bill Lee	Lancer Yacht Corp		
Lancer 39	1982	Herb David	Lancer Yacht Corp		
Lancer 40	1983	Herb David	Lancer Yacht Corp		
Lancer 42	1980	Herb David	Lancer Yacht Corp		
Lancer 44	1979	Herb David	Lancer Yacht Corp		
Lancer 45	1981	Herb David	Lancer Yacht Corp		
La Paz 25	1973	Lyle C. Hess	Coastal Recreation, Inc.		
Lapworth 24	1958	William Lapworth	Continental Plastics Inc.		
Laser 28	1983	Bruce Farr	Performance Sailcraft		
Legende 1 Ton	1984	Doug Peterson	Jeanneau		
Leigh 30	1979	Chuck Paine	Morris Yachts		
Lindenberg 30	1980	Paul Lindenberg	Lindenberg Yachts		
LM 24	1972	Palle Mortensen	Lunderskov Mǿbelfabrik		
Lockley-Newport LN-23	1978	Stuart Windley & Harry R. Sindle	Lockley-Newport Boats		
Lockley-Newport LN-27	1977	Stuart Windley & Harry R. Sindle	Lockley-Newport Boats		
Lord Nelson 41	1982	Loren Hart	Lord Nelson Yachts		
Lynx 16	1997	Tony Davis	Arey's Pond Boat Yard		

== See also ==
- Classic dinghy classes
- List of boat types
- List of historical ship types
- List of keelboat classes designed before 1970
- Olympic sailing classes
- Small-craft sailing
