= Kaiser 25 =

Sailboat class

Development
- Designer: John R. Kaiser Sr.
- Location: United States
- Year: 1962
- Builders: Kaiser Yachts; Stowman Shipbuilding
- Role: Cruiser
- Name: Kaiser 25

Boat
- Displacement: 5,350 lb (2,427 kg)
- Draft: 3.58 ft (1.09 m)

Hull
- Type: monohull
- Construction: fiberglass
- LOA: 25.33 ft (7.72 m)
- LWL: 18.25 ft (5.56 m)
- Beam: 7.83 ft (2.39 m)
- Engine: Volvo 6 hp (4 kW) diesel engine/outboard motor

Hull appendages
- Keel: long keel
- Ballast: 2,250 lb (1,021 kg)
- Rudder: keel-mounted rudder

Rig
- Rig type: Bermuda rig

Sails
- Sailplan: masthead sloop
- Total sail area: 284 sq ft (26.4 m^{2})

Racing
- PHRF: 273

The Kaiser 25 is an American trailerable sailboat that was designed by John R. Kaiser Sr. as a cruiser and first built in 1962.

== Production ==
The design was built by Plastic Fabricators, Inc. of Wilmington, Delaware under contract to Kaiser Yachts/Stowman Shipbuilding in the United States from 1962 until about 1964, but it is now out of production.

== Design ==
The Kaiser 25 is a recreational keelboat, built predominantly of fiberglass, with wood trim. It has a masthead sloop rig; a spooned, raked stem; a raised counter, angled transom; a keel-mounted rudder controlled by a tiller and a fixed long keel. It displaces 5,350 lb (2,427 kg) and carries 2,250 lb (1,021 kg) of lead ballast.

The boat has a draft of 3.58 ft (1.09 m) with the standard keel.

The boat may be fitted with a standard well-mounted outboard motor, or optionally an inboard Swedish Volvo diesel engine of 6 hp (4 kW), for docking and maneuvering.

The design has sleeping accommodation for four people, with a double "V"-berth in the bow cabin and two straight settee berths in the main cabin. The galley is located on both sides of the companionway ladder, with the sink on the port side and the ice box on the starboard. The fresh water tank has a capacity of 20 U.S. gallons (76 L; 17 imp gal). The head is located in the bow cabin under the "V"-berth. Cabin headroom is 74 in (188 cm).

The design has a PHRF racing average handicap of 273 and a hull speed of 5.7 kn (10.6 km/h).

== Operational history ==
In a 2010 review Steve Henkel wrote, "in his sales brochure, Kaiser says that 'it is the intention of the designer to produce a small, able, and comfortable cruising-racing sloop of superior quality in every detail.' The brochure also states that while the entire hull and deck is normally plastic, a superstructure (presumably meaning deck and cabin house) of wood is available at owner's option, and that various changes in the accommodations plan could also be made 'at a slight extra cost.' An outboard well with watertight plug was standard; inboard power was available at a cost, depending on make and model. Best features: This looks like a high-quality product for its day. Worst features: None discovered."

== See also ==
- List of sailing boat types
