= Heritage 20 =

Sailboat class

Development
- Designer: Andras Davidhazy
- Location: United States
- Year: 1967
- No. built: 12
- Builder: Howie Craft Plastics
- Role: Cruiser

Boat
- Displacement: 3,300 lb (1,497 kg)
- Draft: 2.75 ft (0.84 m)

Hull
- Type: monohull
- Construction: fiberglass
- LOA: 20.00 ft (6.10 m)
- LWL: 15.00 ft (4.57 m)
- Beam: 6.50 ft (1.98 m)
- Engine: Westerbeke diesel engine

Hull appendages
- Keel: long keel
- Ballast: 1,200 lb (544 kg)
- Rudder: keel-mounted rudder

Rig
- Rig type: Bermuda rig

Sails
- Sailplan: masthead sloop
- Total sail area: 240.00 sq ft (22.297 m^{2})

The Heritage 20 is an American trailerable sailboat that was designed by Andras Davidhazy as a cruiser and first built in 1967.

== Production ==
The design was built by Howie Craft Plastics in the city of Lake Oswego, Oregon, United States, between 1967 and 1971, but it is now out of production. The company was mostly a one-man operation, run by the founder, Howard Renner. The boats were built one at a time, with only 12 examples completed.

== Design ==
The Heritage 20 is a recreational keelboat, built predominantly of fiberglass, with extensive wood trim. It has a masthead sloop rig; a spooned, raked stem; a raised counter, angled transom; a keel-mounted rudder controlled by a tiller and a fixed long keel. It displaces 3,300 lb (1,497 kg) and carries 1,200 lb (544 kg) of lead ballast.

The boat has a draft of 2.75 ft (0.84 m) with the standard keel.

The boat is fitted with a Westerbeke diesel engine or a small 4 to 10 hp (3 to 7 kW) outboard motor for docking and maneuvering. The fuel tank holds 15 U.S. gallons (57 L; 12 imp gal) and the fresh water tank also has a capacity of 15 U.S. gallons (57 L; 12 imp gal).

The design has sleeping accommodation for four people, with a double "V"-berth in the bow cabin and two straight settee berths in the main cabin. The galley is located on both sides, just aft of the bow cabin. The galley is equipped with a sink. The head is located in the bilge, down in the extra-wide long keel. Cabin headroom is 55 in (140 cm).

For sailing downwind the design may be equipped with a symmetrical spinnaker. The design has a hull speed of 5.2 kn (9.6 km/h).

== Operational history ==
In a 2010 review Steve Henkel wrote, "the most unusual feature of the Heritage 20 is her extra-wide keel, big enough to contain a marine toilet (though we wonder how the waste is pumped uphill to a seacock without backflow, in the good old days before the advent of holding tanks). Best features: Perhaps it is no accident that the Heritage's shape bears a strong resemblance to the beauteous profiles of John Alden's designs, since her designer worked in the Alden office. Her curved stem and stern counter could be right out of an Alden style book. Pretty! Despite her shallow draft and tall rig, Heritage will probably sail better than her comp[etitor]s, none of which is deeper; her high SA/D will make her relatively faster in light air. Worst features: Even with the trick cabin sole, there's not much room below. Big and tall people beware!"

== See also ==
- List of sailing boat types
