= Jeanneau Beniguet =

Sailboat class

Development
- Location: France
- Year: 1970
- Builder: Jeanneau
- Role: Day sailer-cruiser
- Name: Jeanneau Beniguet

Boat
- Displacement: 838 lb (380 kg)
- Draft: 1.64 ft (0.50 m)

Hull
- Type: monohull
- Construction: fiberglass
- LOA: 15.75 ft (4.80 m)
- LWL: 14.00 ft (4.27 m)
- Beam: 6.56 ft (2.00 m)
- Engine: optional diesel engine

Hull appendages
- Keel: long keel
- Ballast: 287 lb (130 kg)
- Rudder: transom-mounted rudder

Rig
- Rig type: Bermuda rig

Sails
- Sailplan: fractional rigged sloop
- Total sail area: 129.00 sq ft (11.984 m^{2})

The Jeanneau Beniguet is a French trailerable sailboat that was designed as a day sailer and pocket cruiser, first built in 1970.

== Production ==
The design was built by Jeanneau in France, starting in 1970, but it is now out of production.

== Design ==
The Beniguet is a recreational keelboat, built predominantly of fiberglass, with wood trim. It has a fractional sloop rig. The hull has a raked stem, an angled transom, a transom-hung rudder controlled by a tiller and a fixed long keel. It displaces 838 lb (380 kg) and carries 287 lb (130 kg) of ballast.

The boat has a draft of 1.64 ft (0.50 m) with the standard keel, allowing operation in shallow water, or ground transportation on a trailer.

When new, the boat could be factory optionally equipped with a diesel inboard engine for docking and maneuvering.

The design has sleeping accommodation for two people, with a double "V"-berth in the cabin.

The design has a hull speed of 5.02 kn (9.30 km/h).

== See also ==
- List of sailing boat types
