= Jeanneau Captain =

Sailboat class

Development
- Location: France
- Year: 1968
- Builder: Jeanneau
- Role: Cruiser and powerboat

Boat
- Displacement: 1,102 lb (500 kg)
- Draft: 4.27 ft (1.30 m) with centerboard down

Hull
- Type: monohull
- Construction: fiberglass
- LOA: 20.67 ft (6.30 m)
- LWL: 17.00 ft (5.18 m)
- Beam: 8.10 ft (2.47 m)
- Engine: Renault inboard motor

Hull appendages
- Keel: stub keel and centerboard
- Ballast: 265 lb (120 kg)
- Rudder: transom-mounted rudder

Rig
- Rig type: Bermuda rig

Sails
- Sailplan: fractional rigged sloop
- Total sail area: 201.00 sq ft (18.674 m^{2})

The Jeanneau Captain is a French trailerable sailboat and powerboat that was first built in 1968.

== Production ==
The design was built by Jeanneau in France, starting in 1968, but it is now out of production.

== Design ==
The Captain was sold as a pure power boat with a wheelhouse added, as a sailboat or as an auxiliary sailboat, with an inboard motor.

The Captain is a recreational keelboat, built predominantly of fiberglass. As a sailboat it has a fractional sloop rig. The hull has a raked stem, a slightly angled transom, a transom-hung rudder controlled by a tiller and a fixed stub keel, with a retractable centerboard. It displaces 1,102 lb (500 kg) and carries 265 lb (120 kg) of ballast.

The boat has a draft of 4.27 ft (1.30 m) with the centerboard extended and 1.64 ft (0.50 m) with it retracted, allowing operation in shallow water or ground transportation on a trailer.

The boat is optionally fitted with a French Renault inboard engine. The fuel tank holds 9 U.S. gallons (34 L; 7.5 imp gal).

The design has a hull speed of 5.52 kn (10.22 km/h).

== See also ==
- List of sailing boat types
