= Jeanneau Yachts 60 =

Sailboat class

Development
- Designer: Philippe Briand; Andrew Winch
- Location: France
- Year: 2021
- Builder: Jeanneau
- Role: Cruiser
- Name: Jeanneau Yachts 60

Boat
- Displacement: 44,467 lb (20,170 kg)
- Draft: 8.37 ft (2.55 m)

Hull
- Type: monohull
- Construction: fiberglass
- LOA: 59.97 ft (18.28 m)
- LWL: 55.18 ft (16.82 m)
- Beam: 17.06 ft (5.20 m)
- Engine: Yanmar 110 hp (82 kW) diesel engine

Hull appendages
- Keel: fin keel with weighted bulb
- Ballast: 10,240 lb (4,645 kg)
- Rudder: spade-type rudder

Rig
- Rig type: Bermuda rig

Sails
- Sailplan: fractional rigged sloop
- Total sail area: 1,410.07 sq ft (131.000 m^{2})

The Jeanneau Yachts 60 is a French blue water cruising sailboat. The hull was designed by Philippe Briand, with the interior by Andrew Winch. It was first built in 2021.

== Production ==
The design was built by Jeanneau in France, starting in 2021, and remained in production in 2023.

== Design ==
The Jeanneau Yachts 60 is a recreational keelboat, built predominantly of vacuum-infused fiberglass, with wood trim. It has a fractional sloop with a bowsprit, an over-plumb stem, a slightly reverse transom with a drop-down tailgate-style swimming platform, dual internally mounted spade-type rudders controlled by dual wheels and a fixed L-shaped fin keel with a weighted bulb. The mainsheet is mounted on a cockpit arch and there is a dinghy garage aft. It displaces 44,467 lb (20,170 kg) empty and carries 10,240 lb (4,645 kg) of cast iron ballast.

The boat has a draft of 8.37 ft (2.55 m) with the standard keel.

The boat is fitted with a Japanese Yanmar diesel engine of 110 hp (82 kW) for docking and maneuvering. The fuel tank holds 84 U.S. gallons (320 L; 70 imp gal) and the fresh water tank has a capacity of 100 U.S. gallons (380 L; 83 imp gal).

The boat is a semi-custom design and as such the company offers a wide range of customization. Options include the interior design, cockpit enclosures, as well as the sail plan. Interiors can be a three cabin layout with three heads or a four cabin layout with four heads.

A typical three cabin layout has sleeping accommodation for five people, with a double island berth in the forward cabin, a U-shaped settee and individual seats in the main cabin and two aft cabins, one with a double berth on the starboard side and a single on the port side. The galley is located forward in its own space. A navigation station is in the aft part of the main salon, on the port side. There are three heads, one for each cabin, including one located in the bow for the forward cabin.

== Operational history ==
The boat is supported by an active class club the Jeanneau Owners Network.

In a 2021 review, Adam Cort wrote, "especially interesting is the boat's impressively spacious cockpit layout, which to my eye seems more than a little reminiscent of the catamaran-inspired Jeanneau Sun Loft 47, a monohull purpose-built for the charter trade. Combining the optional arch and hardtop with the boat’s aggressively curved dodger will provide all the sheltered space aft you could ever want, whether on passage or at anchor. A clever step also allows easy access to a swim step/boarding platform that drops down to reveal a substantial tender garage. In keeping with other recent additions to the Jeanneau line, the transition from the cockpit to the side decks is a seamless one."

== See also ==
- List of sailing boat types
