= Imperial 23 =

1960s British recreational keelboat

Development
- Designer: L. Wakefield
- Location: United Kingdom
- Year: 1966
- Builder: Russell Marine
- Role: Cruiser
- Name: Imperial 23

Boat
- Displacement: 2,700 lb (1,225 kg)
- Draft: 2.75 ft (0.84 m)

Hull
- Type: monohull
- Construction: glassfibre
- LOA: 22.50 ft (6.86 m)
- LWL: 20.00 ft (6.10 m)
- Beam: 7.50 ft (2.29 m)
- Engine: inboard engine or outboard motor

Hull appendages
- Keel: twin keels
- Ballast: 1,120 lb (508 kg)
- Rudder: skeg-mounted rudder

Rig
- Rig type: Bermuda rig
- I foretriangle height: 25.00 ft (7.62 m)
- J foretriangle base: 7.83 ft (2.39 m)
- P mainsail luff: 23.00 ft (7.01 m)
- E mainsail foot: 10.00 ft (3.05 m)

Sails
- Sailplan: masthead sloop
- Mainsail area: 115.00 sq ft (10.684 m^{2})
- Jib/genoa area: 97.88 sq ft (9.093 m^{2})
- Total sail area: 212.88 sq ft (19.777 m^{2})

The Imperial 23 is a recreational keelboat. Starting in 1968 it was sold as the Islander 23. It was built by Russell Marine in the United Kingdom, from 1966 until about 1970. It was imported into the United States by Wells Yachts.

== Design ==
The Imperial 23 is a recreational keelboat, built predominantly of glassfibre, with wood trim. It has a masthead sloop rig, a raked stem plumb stem, a slightly reverse transom, a skeg-mounted rudder controlled by a tiller and a fixed twin keels. It displaces 2,700 lb (1,225 kg) and carries 1,120 lb (508 kg) of iron ballast.

The boat has a draft of 2.75 ft (0.84 m) with the standard twin keels.

The boat is normally fitted with a small 6 hp (4 kW) outboard motor for docking and manoeuvring or, optionally, an inboard motor.

The design has sleeping accommodation for four people, with a dual quarter berths in the bow cabin and two straight settees in the aft of the main cabin. The galley is located on the port side just forward of the companionway ladder. The galley is equipped with a two-burner stove and a sink. The head is located in the bow cabin, between the bow quarter berths. The fresh water tank has a capacity of 6 U.S. gallons (23 L; 5.0 imp gal). Cabin headroom is 54 in (137 cm).

The design has a hull speed of 6.0 kn (11.1 km/h).

== Reception ==
In a 2010 review American Steve Henkel wrote, "here is a typical British import of the 1960s: Twin iron keels and a sturdy rudder skeg for lying upright on the English tidal flats without risk of damage; heavy, sturdy hull and relatively small sail area for dealing with brisk English Channel winds; tabernacle for easier mast lowerings provision for an inboard engine despite the boat's relatively small size. (Re size: The boat measures 22' 6" from the lower tip of her reverse transom to the forward tip of her galvanized steel anchor roller, thus claiming to be a '23-footer.' On deck she’s only 22' 2".) Best features: Forward quarter berths instead of the usual V-berths provide easier access to the head, complete with hinged door for privacy. A unique (but optional) 'Autohoist' permits vertical storage of an outboard engine; the skipper winds the motor out of the water with a worm-gear driven winch. Worst features: The jutting samson post [sic] on the small foredeck may make picking up and securing a mooring easier, but might worry the foredeck crew who, when in a hurry, could easily trip on the upward-sticking prong."
