= Eastward Ho 24 =

Sailboat class

Development
- Designer: Walter McInnis
- Location: United States
- Year: 1975
- Builder: Portsmouth Yachts
- Role: Cruiser

Boat
- Displacement: 7,000 lb (3,175 kg)
- Draft: 3.83 ft (1.17 m)

Hull
- Type: monohull
- Construction: fiberglass
- LOA: 23.67 ft (7.21 m)
- LWL: 20.00 ft (6.10 m)
- Beam: 8.67 ft (2.64 m)
- Engine: Palmer gasoline engine

Hull appendages
- Keel: long keel
- Ballast: 3,000 lb (1,361 kg)
- Rudder: keel-mounted rudder

Rig
- Rig type: Bermuda rig
- I foretriangle height: 31.70 ft (9.66 m)
- J foretriangle base: 9.00 ft (2.74 m)
- P mainsail luff: 26.00 ft (7.92 m)
- E mainsail foot: 12.20 ft (3.72 m)

Sails
- Sailplan: masthead sloop
- Mainsail area: 158.60 sq ft (14.734 m^{2})
- Jib/genoa area: 142.65 sq ft (13.253 m^{2})
- Total sail area: 301.25 sq ft (27.987 m^{2})

Racing
- PHRF: 269

The Eastward Ho 24 is an American trailerable sailboat that was designed by Walter McInnis of Eldridge-McInnis, as a cruiser and first built in 1975.

== Production ==
The design was built by C. E. Ryder in Bristol, Rhode Island under contract, then finished and marketed by Portsmouth Yachts in the United States. The first boats were built in 1975, but it is now out of production.

== Design ==
The Eastward Ho 24 is a recreational keelboat, built predominantly of fiberglass, with wood trim. It has a masthead sloop rig, a spooned plumb stem, an angled transom, a keel-mounted rudder controlled by a tiller and a fixed long keel. With the optional bowsprit it can be cutter rigged. The boat displaces 7,000 lb (3,175 kg) and carries 3,000 lb (1,361 kg) of lead ballast.

The boat has a draft of 3.83 ft (1.17 m) with the standard keel.

The boat is fitted with a Swedish Volvo MD4 diesel engine of 22 hp (16 kW), a Universal Atomic 4 30 hp (22 kW) or Palmer gasoline engine for docking and maneuvering. The fuel tank holds 22 U.S. gallons (83 L; 18 imp gal) and the fresh water tank also has a capacity of 22 U.S. gallons (83 L; 18 imp gal).

The design has sleeping accommodation for four people, with two straight settee quarter berths in the main cabin and upper berths above them. The main cabin has a drop-leaf table. The galley is located on both sides of the companionway ladder. The galley is equipped with a stove, an icebox and a sink. The head is in the bow. Cabin headroom is 76 in (190 cm).

The design has a PHRF racing average handicap of 269 and a hull speed of 6.0 kn (11.1 km/h).

== Operational history ==
In a 2010 review Steve Henkel wrote, "the Eastward Ho was available either as a sloop ... or, with a bowsprit added, as a cutter. There was also a choice of motive power, including a Volvo MD-2 diesel (22 hp) or an Atomic Four (30 hp). The designer, Eldredge McInnis of Boston, MA, a firm started in 1926, tended to specialize in large yachts, especially motorsailers. (The firm closed in 1976 when Walter J. McInnis retired at age 83. Albert Eldredge had died in 1936 but was involved in sales, not design.) Even though she's less than 24 feet on deck, because of her displacement of 7,000 pounds she can use the power to punch through waves. Typically, these boats were offered with a yacht finish, teak and holly sole, teak interior, fine jointer-work, and so on. Best features: This is a top-of-the-line yacht for her size range. She is durable, beautiful to look at, and a good sailer, especially when it breezes up. Worst features: When these boats come onto the market, which is rare, they typically command a premium price."

== See also ==
- List of sailing boat types
