= Espace 1100 =

Sailboat class

Development
- Designer: Philippe Briand
- Location: France
- Year: 1985
- Builder: Jeanneau
- Role: Cruiser
- Name: Espace 1100

Boat
- Displacement: 14,080 lb (6,387 kg)
- Draft: 5.42 ft (1.65 m)

Hull
- Type: monohull
- Construction: fiberglass
- LOA: 37.67 ft (11.48 m)
- LWL: 30.17 ft (9.20 m)
- Beam: 11.92 ft (3.63 m)
- Engine: Perkins Engines 4-154 diesel engine

Hull appendages
- Keel: fin keel
- Ballast: 4,873 lb (2,210 kg)
- Rudder: skeg-mounted rudder

Rig
- Rig type: Bermuda rig
- I foretriangle height: 42.46 ft (12.94 m)
- J foretriangle base: 12.53 ft (3.82 m)
- P mainsail luff: 37.24 ft (11.35 m)
- E mainsail foot: 11.81 ft (3.60 m)

Sails
- Sailplan: masthead sloop
- Mainsail area: 219.90 sq ft (20.429 m^{2})
- Jib/genoa area: 266.01 sq ft (24.713 m^{2})
- Total sail area: 485.91 sq ft (45.143 m^{2})

The Espace 1100 (English: Space) is a French sailboat that was designed by Philippe Briand as a cruiser and first built in 1985. The boat is one of the Espace series of cruising sailboats and its designation indicates its approximate length overall in centimeters.

== Production ==
The design was built by Jeanneau in France, from 1985 until 1989.

== Design ==
The Espace 1100 is a recreational keelboat, built predominantly of fiberglass, with wood trim. It has a masthead sloop rig, with aluminum spars with stainless steel wire rigging. The hull has a raked stem, a reverse transom with a swimming platform, a skeg-mounted rudder controlled by two wheels, one in the cockpit and one in the wheelhouse. It has a fixed fin keel or optional keel and centerboard. The fin keel version displaces 14,080 lb (6,387 kg) and carries 4,873 lb (2,210 kg) of ballast, while the centerboard-equipped version displaces 14,168 lb (6,426 kg).

The keel-equipped version of the boat has a draft of 5.42 ft (1.65 m), while the centerboard-equipped version has a draft of 7.33 ft (2.23 m) with the centerboard extended and 4.0 ft (1.2 m) with it retracted, allowing operation in shallow water.

The boat is fitted with a British Perkins Engines 4-154 diesel engine for docking and maneuvering. The fuel tank holds 52 U.S. gallons (200 L; 43 imp gal) and the fresh water tank has a capacity of 66 U.S. gallons (250 L; 55 imp gal).

The design has sleeping accommodation for six people, with a double "V"-berth in the bow cabin, double settee port amidships and an aft cabin with a double berth on the starboard side. The galley is located on the starboard amidships. The galley is equipped with a two-burner stove, ice box and a double sink. A navigation station is opposite the galley, centered above, in the wheelhouse next to the salon. The head is located just aft of the bow cabin on the port side and includes a shower.

For sailing downwind the design may be equipped with a symmetrical spinnaker.

The design has a hull speed of 7.36 kn (13.63 km/h).

== See also ==
- List of sailing boat types
