= Elite 25 =

Sailboat class

Development
- Designer: Michel Joubert
- Location: France
- Year: 1982
- No. built: 260
- Builder: Kirié
- Role: Cruiser
- Name: Elite 25

Boat
- Displacement: 3,968 lb (1,800 kg)
- Draft: 4.58 ft (1.40 m)

Hull
- Type: monohull
- Construction: fiberglass
- LOA: 24.67 ft (7.52 m)
- LWL: 20.52 ft (6.25 m)
- Beam: 8.83 ft (2.69 m)
- Engine: inboard engine/outboard motor

Hull appendages
- Keel: fin keel
- Ballast: 1,430 lb (649 kg)
- Rudder: transom-mounted rudder

Rig
- Rig type: Bermuda rig
- I foretriangle height: 27.56 ft (8.40 m)
- J foretriangle base: 9.84 ft (3.00 m)
- P mainsail luff: 25.59 ft (7.80 m)
- E mainsail foot: 9.06 ft (2.76 m)

Sails
- Sailplan: fractional rigged sloop
- Mainsail area: 127 sq ft (11.8 m^{2})
- Jib/genoa area: 116 sq ft (10.8 m^{2})
- Spinnaker area: 1,426 sq ft (132.5 m^{2})
- Other sails: Genoa 206 sq ft (19.1 m^{2}), storm jib 53 sq ft (4.9 m^{2})
- Upwind sail area: 333 sq ft (30.9 m^{2})
- Downwind sail area: 553 sq ft (51.4 m^{2})

Racing
- PHRF: 201

The Elite 25, also called the Feeling 720 NV, is a French trailerable sailboat that was designed by Michel Joubert of Joubert-Nivelt as a cruiser and first built in 1982.

== Production ==
The design was built by Kirié in France between 1982 and 1987, with 260 boats completed. Feeling 720 NV production continued until 1992, but it is now out of production.

== Design ==
The Elite 25 is a recreational keelboat, built predominantly of single skin polyester fiberglass, with wood trim. It has a fractional sloop rig with aluminum spars and wire standing rigging, with a deck-stepped mast and a single set of unswept spreaders. The hull has a raked stem, a plumb transom, a transom-hung rudder controlled by a tiller and a fixed fin keel or keel and a steel centerboard.

The boat is fitted either a inboard engine or a small 6 to 10 hp (4 to 7 kW) outboard motor for docking and maneuvering.

The design has sleeping accommodation for four people, with a double "V"-berth in the bow and an aft cabin with a double berth on the port side. The galley is located on the port side just forward of the companionway ladder. The galley is L-shaped and is equipped with a two-burner stove, a 13.2 U.S. gallons (50 L; 11.0 imp gal) icebox and a sink. The head is located amidships on the starboard side. The fresh water tank has a capacity of 20 U.S. gallons (76 L; 17 imp gal). Cabin headroom is 72 in (180 cm).

For downwind sailing the design may be equipped with a spinnaker of 426 sq ft (39.6 m^{2}).

The design has a PHRF racing average handicap of 201 and a hull speed of 6.2 kn (11.5 km/h).

== Variants ==
Elite 25 fin keel
This model displaces 3,968 lb (1,800 kg) and carries 1,430 lb (649 kg) of cast iron ballast. The boat has a draft of 4.58 ft (1.40 m) with the standard keel.
Elite 25 keel and centerboard
This model displaces 4,299 lb (1,950 kg) and carries 1,742 lb (790 kg) of ballast. The boat has a draft of 5.18 ft (1.58 m) with the steel centerboard down and 2.25 ft (0.69 m) with it retracted.

== Operational history ==
In a 2010 review Steve Henkel wrote, "best features: The boats included good quality materials (aluminum ports and hatches, teak and holly cabin soles, varnished elm interiors, teak cockpit seats). PHRF of 201 signifies good speed versus comps. Worst features: Fabric cabin liners were not up to an otherwise good standard of quality."

== See also ==
- List of sailing boat types
