= Jouët 760 =

Sailboat class

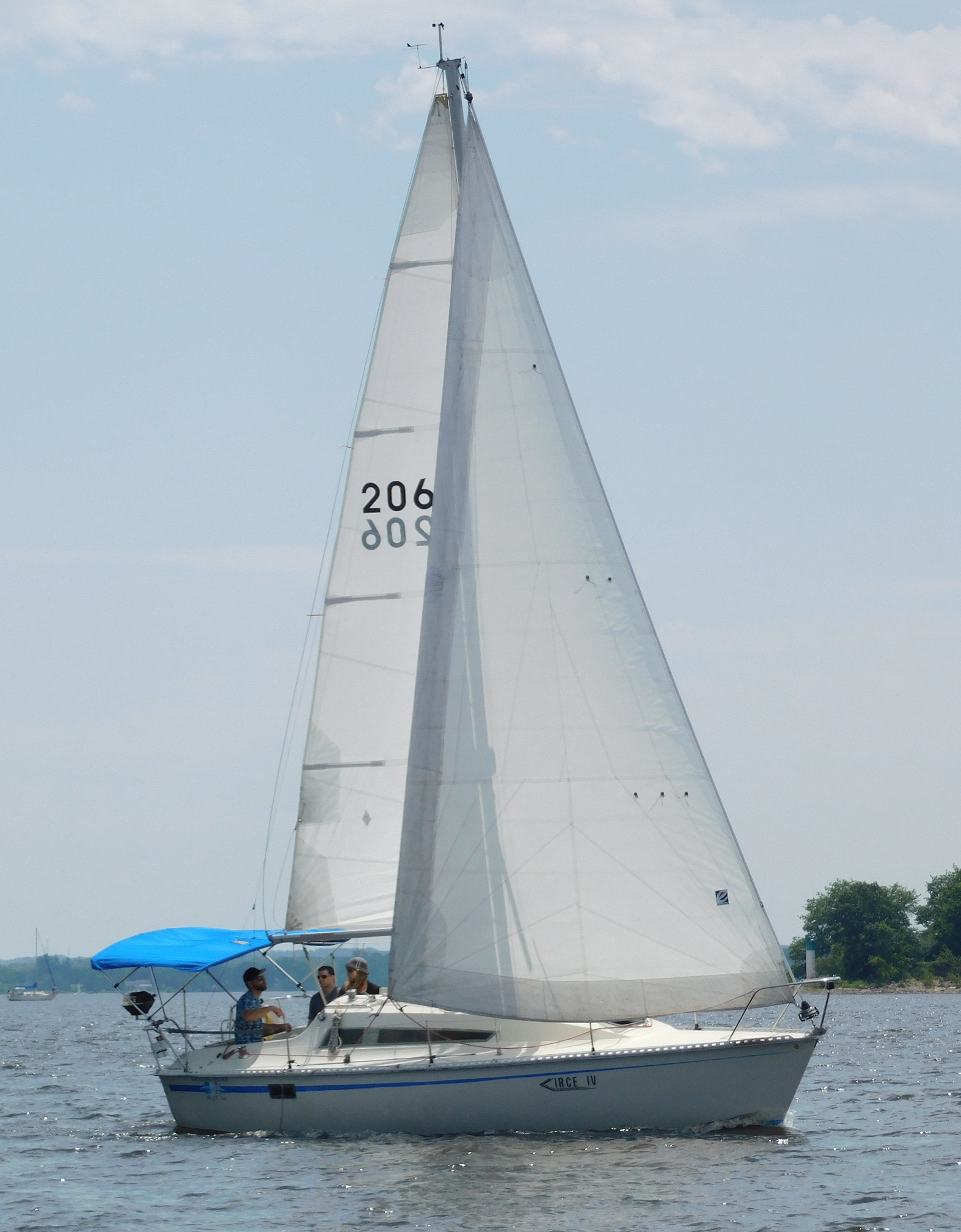

Development
- Designer: Philippe Briand
- Location: France
- Year: 1982
- No. built: 150
- Builder: Yachting France
- Name: Jouët 760

Boat
- Displacement: 4,850 lb (2,200 kg)
- Draft: 5.25 ft (1.60 m)

Hull
- Type: Monohull
- Construction: Fiberglass
- LOA: 24.93 ft (7.60 m)
- LWL: 21.33 ft (6.50 m)
- Beam: 9.20 ft (2.80 m)
- Engine: Volvo Penta MD5 7.5 hp (6 kW) diesel engine

Hull appendages
- Keel: fin keel or short keel and centreboard
- Rudder: transom-mounted rudder

Rig
- General: Masthead sloop
- I foretriangle height: 32.50 ft (9.91 m)
- J foretriangle base: 10.00 ft (3.05 m)
- P mainsail luff: 26.40 ft (8.05 m)
- E mainsail foot: 8.70 ft (2.65 m)

Sails
- Mainsail area: 114.84 sq ft (10.669 m^{2})
- Jib/genoa area: 162.50 sq ft (15.097 m^{2})
- Total sail area: 277.34 sq ft (25.766 m^{2})

The Jouët 760 is a French sailboat, that was designed by Philippe Briand.

== Production ==
The boat was built by Yachting France under the Jouët name, between 1982 and 1986, with 150 examples completed, but it is now out of production.

The Jouët 760 design is very similar to the related Jouët 750.

== Design ==
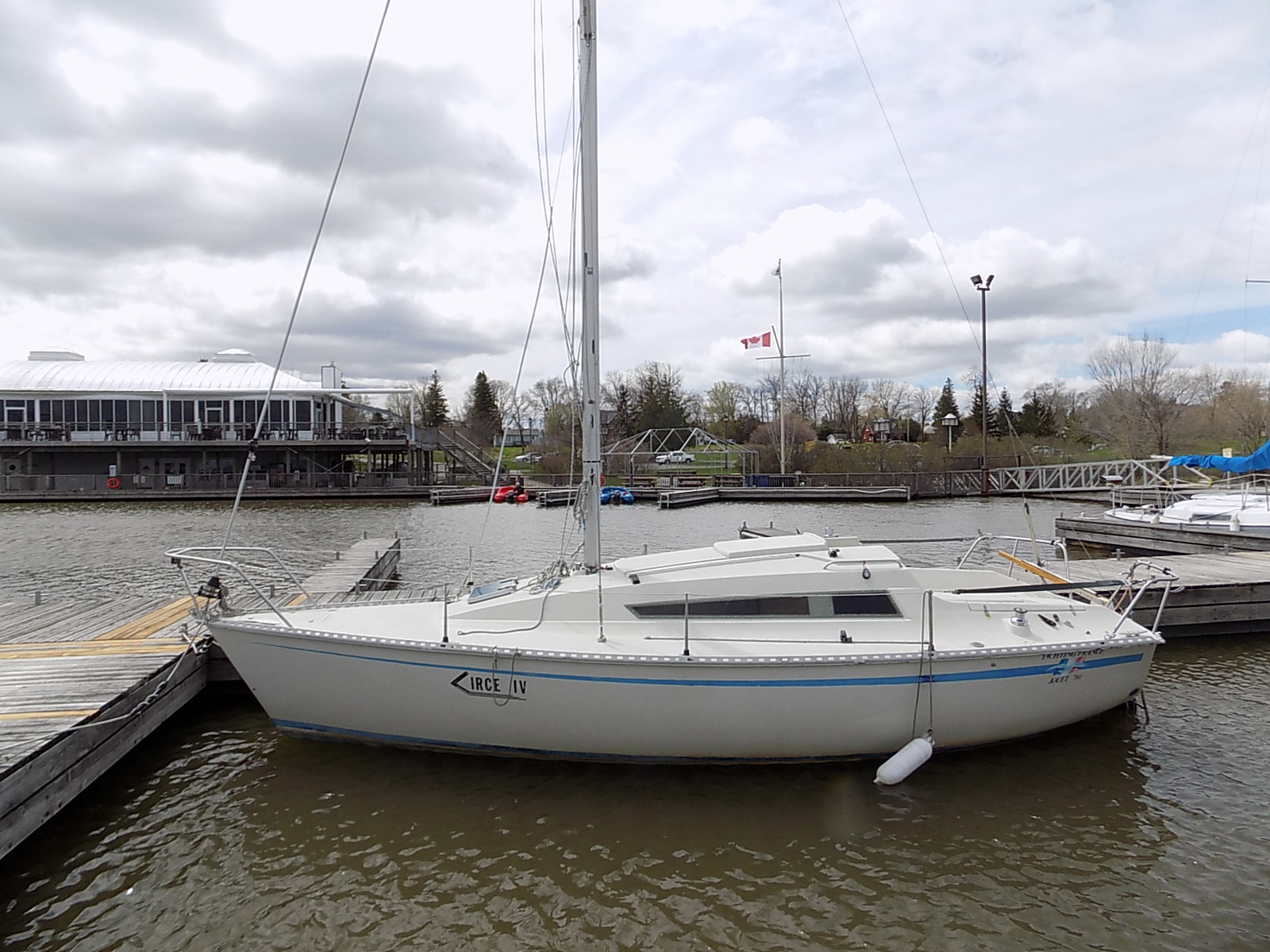
Jouët 760

The Jouët 760 is a small recreational keelboat, built predominantly of fiberglass. It has a masthead sloop rig, a transom-hung rudder and a fixed fin keel or optionally a short keel and centreboard. It displaces 4,850 lb (2,200 kg).

The boat has a draft of 5.25 ft (1.60 m) with the standard fixed fin keel.

The boat is fitted with a Volvo Penta MD5 diesel engine of 7.5 hp (6 kW). It has a hull speed of 6.2 kn (11 km/h).

== See also ==
- List of sailing boat types
