= Jeanneau Poker =

Sailboat class

Development
- Designer: Michel Joubert
- Location: France
- Year: 1972
- No. built: 620
- Builder: Jeanneau
- Role: Racer-Cruiser
- Name: Jeanneau Poker

Boat
- Displacement: 4,850 lb (2,200 kg)
- Draft: 4.76 ft (1.45 m)

Hull
- Type: monohull
- Construction: fiberglass
- LOA: 27.07 ft (8.25 m)
- LWL: 21.00 ft (6.40 m)
- Beam: 9.35 ft (2.85 m)

Hull appendages
- Keel: fin keel
- Ballast: 2,116 lb (960 kg)
- Rudder: skeg-mounted rudder

Rig
- Rig type: Bermuda rig

Sails
- Sailplan: masthead sloop
- Total sail area: 274.00 sq ft (25.455 m^{2})

The Jeanneau Poker is a French sailboat that was designed by Michel Joubert of the Joubert-Nivelt design firm, as a racer-cruiser and first built in 1972.

There was also a Flush Poker model with a lower coach house roof.

== Production ==
The design was built by Jeanneau in France in the United States, from 1972 until 1978, with a total of 620 boats completed.

== Design ==
The Poker is a recreational keelboat, built predominantly of fiberglass, with wood trim. It has a masthead sloop rig. The hull has a raked stem, a reverse transom, a skeg-mounted rudder and a fixed swept fin keel. It displaces 4,850 lb (2,200 kg) and carries 2,116 lb (960 kg) of iron ballast.

The boat has a draft of 4.76 ft (1.45 m) with the standard keel.

The design has sleeping accommodation for five people, with a double "V"-berth in the bow cabin, two straight settee berths in the main cabin and an aft quarter berth on the starboard side. The galley is located on the port side at the companionway ladder. The galley is equipped with a two-burner stove, an ice box and a sink. The head is located just aft of the bow cabin on the starboard side.

For sailing downwind the design may be equipped with a symmetrical spinnaker and has a hull speed of 6.14 kn (11.37 km/h).

== See also ==
- List of sailing boat types
