= Eastsail 25 =

Sailboat class

Development
- Designer: Eliot Spalding
- Location: United States
- Year: 1984
- Builder: Eastsail Yachts
- Role: Cruiser
- Name: Eastsail 25

Boat
- Displacement: 7,200 lb (3,266 kg)
- Draft: 3.67 ft (1.12 m)

Hull
- Type: monohull
- Construction: fiberglass
- LOA: 25.00 ft (7.62 m)
- LWL: 20.83 ft (6.35 m)
- Beam: 8.50 ft (2.59 m)
- Engine: inboard engine/outboard motor

Hull appendages
- Keel: long keel
- Ballast: 2,300 lb (1,043 kg)
- Rudder: keel-mounted rudder

Rig
- Rig type: Cutter rig

Sails
- Sailplan: cutter rigged sloop
- Total sail area: 400.00 sq ft (37.161 m^{2})

The Eastsail 25 is an American trailerable sailboat that was designed by Eliot Spalding as an off-shore cruiser and first built in 1984.

The design was developed into the Eastsail All Weather 25.

== Production ==
The design was built by Eastsail Yachts in Bow, New Hampshire, United States, but it is now out of production.

== Design ==
The Eastsail 25 is a recreational keelboat, built predominantly of fiberglass, with wood trim. It has a cutter rig, a raked stem with a clipper bow and a bowsprit, an angled transom, a keel-mounted rudder controlled by a tiller and a fixed long keel. It displaces 7,200 lb (3,266 kg) and carries 2,300 lb (1,043 kg) of ballast.

The boat has a draft of 3.67 ft (1.12 m) with the standard keel.

The boat may be fitted with either a inboard engine or a small 10 to 20 hp (7 to 15 kW) outboard motor for docking and maneuvering. The fuel tank holds 20 U.S. gallons (76 L; 17 imp gal) and the fresh water tank has a capacity of 35 U.S. gallons (130 L; 29 imp gal).

The design has sleeping accommodation for five people, with a double "V"-berth in the bow cabin, a straight settee and straight settee/drop-down table combination in the main cabin. The galley is located on the starboard side just forward of the companionway ladder. The galley is equipped with a two-burner stove, an icebox and a sink. The head is located on the port side opposite the galley. Cabin headroom is 72 in (180 cm).

The design has a hull speed of 6.1 kn (11.3 km/h).

== Operational history ==
In a 2010 review Steve Henkel wrote, "the builders, Eastsail Yachts of Bow, New Hampshire, advertise this as a 'rugged, trailerable, pocket cruiser of traditional lines carrying a full keel and full headroom, designed for the long voyage,' that is, extended offshore cruising ... The Eastsail is what amounts to .a custom boat, with the owner specifying rig, interior design, wood trim (teak, mahogany, or plain white paneling with minimal hardwood trim), number of berths, tankage, motor power (small inboard diesel or a four-stroke outboard mounted under the lazarette hatch), traditional bronze or modern stainless steel hardware, and so on. An 'All Weather' model ... raises the boom a bit to sneak a doghouse underneath it, adding a little to the masthead bridge clearance and 300 pounds to the displacement, but changing little else. Best features: If you're not quite ready to do a circumnavigation, but want to sail, say, regularly from Maine to Florida and back, this may be a better choice than the more purpose-built Vertue or Fisher. Worst features: The cabin house appears to be high enough to obstruct a clear view from the helmsman's position when seated."

== See also ==
- List of sailing boat types
