= Helms 24 =

Sailboat class

Development
- Designer: Stuart Windley
- Location: United States
- Year: 1977
- No. built: 750
- Builder: Jack A. Helms Co.
- Role: Cruiser

Boat
- Displacement: 4,200 lb (1,905 kg)
- Draft: 4.17 ft (1.27 m)

Hull
- Type: monohull
- Construction: fiberglass
- LOA: 23.92 ft (7.29 m)
- LWL: 20.83 ft (6.35 m)
- Beam: 8.83 ft (2.69 m)
- Engine: outboard motor

Hull appendages
- Keel: fin keel
- Ballast: 1,850 lb (839 kg)
- Rudder: transom-mounted rudder

Rig
- Rig type: Bermuda rig
- I foretriangle height: 30.50 ft (9.30 m)
- J foretriangle base: 10.50 ft (3.20 m)
- P mainsail luff: 25.50 ft (7.77 m)
- E mainsail foot: 9.00 ft (2.74 m)

Sails
- Sailplan: masthead sloop
- Mainsail area: 114.75 sq ft (10.661 m^{2})
- Jib/genoa area: 160.13 sq ft (14.877 m^{2})
- Total sail area: 274.88 sq ft (25.537 m^{2})

Rating
- PHRF: 234

The Helms 24 is an American trailerable sailboat that was designed by Stuart Windley as a cruiser and first built in 1977.

== Production ==
The design was built by Jack A. Helms Co., a furniture maker in Irmo, South Carolina, United States. Production began in 1977, with 750 boats completed in total, but it is now out of production.

== Design ==
The Helms 24 is a recreational keelboat, built predominantly of fiberglass, with wood trim. It has a masthead sloop rig, a raked stem, a plumb transom, a transom-hung rudder controlled by a tiller, and a fixed fin keel or optional shoal draft keel. It displaces 4,200 lb (1,905 kg) and carries 1,850 lb (839 kg) of ballast.

The boat has a draft of 4.17 ft (1.27 m) with the standard keel and 3.00 ft (0.91 m) with the optional shoal draft keel.

The boat is normally fitted with a small 4 to 8 hp (3 to 6 kW) outboard motor for docking and maneuvering. A Yanmar 1GM10 diesel inboard engine was optional.

The design has sleeping accommodation for five people, with a double "V"-berth in the bow cabin and two straight settees in the main cabin, the port one of which can be converted into a double. The galley is located on the starboard side at the companionway ladder. The galley is L-shaped and is equipped with a two-burner stove, icebox, and a sink. The head is located just aft of the bow cabin on both sides and includes a sink. Cabin headroom is 68 in (173 cm).

The design has a PHRF racing average handicap of 234 and a hull speed of 6.1 kn (11.3 km/h).

== Operational history ==
In a 2010 review, Steve Henkel wrote, "The brochure says she sleeps five, with the port settee converting to a double. But even assuming the starboard settee extends aft under the stove for footroom, it's hard to imagine five full-sized humans sleeping comfortably aboard, especially with the kiddy-sized V-berth forward. Best features: With her wide beam and high sheer, her space ... and headroom are much better than her comp[etitor]s. Her longer waterline and higher B/D ratio also help in the speed department, as indicated by her lower PHRF rating. Worst features: There may have been problems with leakage around the external lead keel seam..."

== See also ==
- List of sailing boat types
