= Evelyn 25 =

Sailboat class

Development
- Designer: Bob Evelyn
- Location: United States
- Year: 1984
- No. built: 6
- Builder: Formula Yachts
- Role: Racer-Cruiser

Boat
- Displacement: 2,600 lb (1,179 kg)
- Draft: 4.40 ft (1.34 m)

Hull
- Type: monohull
- Construction: fiberglass
- LOA: 24.75 ft (7.54 m)
- LWL: 21.50 ft (6.55 m)
- Beam: 8.67 ft (2.64 m)
- Engine: outboard motor

Hull appendages
- Keel: fin keel
- Ballast: 1,100 lb (499 kg)
- Rudder: internally-mounted spade-type rudder

Rig
- Rig type: Bermuda rig
- I foretriangle height: 31.50 ft (9.60 m)
- J foretriangle base: 10.60 ft (3.23 m)
- P mainsail luff: 27.00 ft (8.23 m)
- E mainsail foot: 9.50 ft (2.90 m)

Sails
- Sailplan: masthead sloop
- Mainsail area: 128.25 sq ft (11.915 m^{2})
- Jib/genoa area: 166.95 sq ft (15.510 m^{2})
- Total sail area: 295.20 sq ft (27.425 m^{2})

Racing
- PHRF: 147

The Evelyn 25 is an American trailerable sailboat that was designed by Bob Evelyn as a racer-cruiser and first built in 1984.

== Production ==
The design was built by Formula Yachts in Groton, Connecticut United States from 1984 to 1985, with six boats completed, but it is now out of production.

== Design ==
The Evelyn 25 is a recreational keelboat, built predominantly of fiberglass with a Divinycell core and with wood trim. It has a masthead sloop rig, a raked stem, a reverse transom, an internally mounted spade-type rudder controlled by a tiller and a fixed fin keel. It displaces 2,600 lb (1,179 kg) and carries 1,100 lb (499 kg) of lead ballast.

The boat has a draft of 4.40 ft (1.34 m) with the standard keel.

The boat is normally fitted with a small 3 to 6 hp (2 to 4 kW) outboard motor for docking and maneuvering.

The design has sleeping accommodation for four people, with a double "V"-berth in the bow cabin and two straight settee berths in the main cabin. A fold-down navigation station is provided. The head is fully enclosed. Cabin headroom is 54 in (140 cm).

The design has a PHRF racing average handicap of 147 and a hull speed of 6.2 kn (11.5 km/h).

== Operational history ==
In a 2010 review Steve Henkel wrote, "this boat, built at designer-builder Bob Evelyn’s high-tech facility in Groton, CT, was meant to be light ... Her hull, laid up by hand, uses a Divinycell core, unidirectional fiberglass, and carbon-fiber stiffening ... Best features: Hardware is top quality, including a keel-stepped mast from Hall Spars, Harken ball-bearing traveler, and dual-speed winches. Worst features: In 1985 the management at Formula Yachts predicted that the boat's PHRF rating would turn out to be in 'the low 170s'. Even after more than a decade of race course performance, the boat's performance has been in the range of 147—perhaps testifying to the owners' passion for racing."

== See also ==
- List of sailing boat types
