= Jeanneau Brin de Folie =

Sailboat class

Brin de Folie
Development
- Designer: Jean Marie Finot and Philippe Harlé
- Location: France
- Year: 1970
- No. built: 820
- Builder: Jeanneau
- Role: Cruiser

Boat
- Displacement: 6,614 lb (3,000 kg)
- Draft: 5.41 ft (1.65 m)

Hull
- Type: monohull
- Construction: fiberglass
- LOA: 28.54 ft (8.70 m)
- LWL: 22.15 ft (6.75 m)
- Beam: 10.17 ft (3.10 m)
- Engine: diesel inboard engine

Hull appendages
- Keel: fin keel
- Ballast: 2,425 lb (1,100 kg)
- Rudder: skeg-mounted rudder

Rig
- Rig type: Bermuda rig

Sails
- Sailplan: masthead sloop
- Mainsail area: 156 sq ft (14.5 m^{2})
- Jib/genoa area: 151 sq ft (14.0 m^{2})
- Spinnaker area: 689 sq ft (64.0 m^{2})
- Other sails: storm jib: 59 sq ft (5.5 m^{2}) genoa: 318 sq ft (29.5 m^{2})
- Upwind sail area: 474 sq ft (44.0 m^{2})
- Downwind sail area: 845 sq ft (78.5 m^{2})

[[File:Jeanneau folie douce.jpg|thumb|voilier 9m×3m, 3t, tirant d'eau 1.45m]]

The Jeanneau Brin de Folie, also called the Folie Douce, is a French sailboat that was designed by Jean Marie Finot and Philippe Harlé as a cruiser and first built in 1970.

== Production ==
The design was built by Jeanneau in France, from 1970 until 1980, with 820 boats completed. The design was originally marketed by the manufacturer as the Folie Douce (English: Tender Madness), but in 1975, halfway through the ten-year production run, the name was changed to Brin de Folie (English: Touch of Madness).

== Design ==
The Brin de Folie is a recreational keelboat, built predominantly of fiberglass, with wood trim. It has a masthead sloop rig, with a deck-stepped mast, one set of straight spreaders and aluminum spars with stainless steel wire rigging. The hull has a raked stem; a raised counter, reverse transom; a skeg-mounted rudder controlled by a tiller and a fixed fin keel. It displaces 6,614 lb (3,000 kg) and carries 2,425 lb (1,100 kg) of cast iron ballast.

The boat has a draft of 5.41 ft (1.65 m) with the standard keel and 4.83 ft (1.47 m) with the optional shoal draft keel.

The boat is optionally factory fitted with a inboard diesel engine of 10 hp (7 kW) or may use a small 10 hp (7 kW) outboard motor for docking and maneuvering.

The design has sleeping accommodation for six people, with a double "V"-berth in the bow cabin, two straight settee in the main cabin and an aft cabin with a single berth on the starboard side. The galley is located on the port side just forward of the companionway ladder. The galley is equipped with a two-burner stove, an ice box and a sink. A navigation station is opposite the galley, on the starboard side. The head is located just aft of the bow cabin. The fresh water tank has a capacity of 24 U.S. gallons (91 L; 20 imp gal). Cabin headroom is 73 in (185 cm) in the main cabin and 61 in (155 cm).

For sailing downwind the design may be equipped with a symmetrical spinnaker of 689 sq ft (64.0 m^{2}).

The design has a hull speed of 6.31 kn (11.69 km/h).

== See also ==
- List of sailing boat types
