= Fareast 18R =

- Class symbol

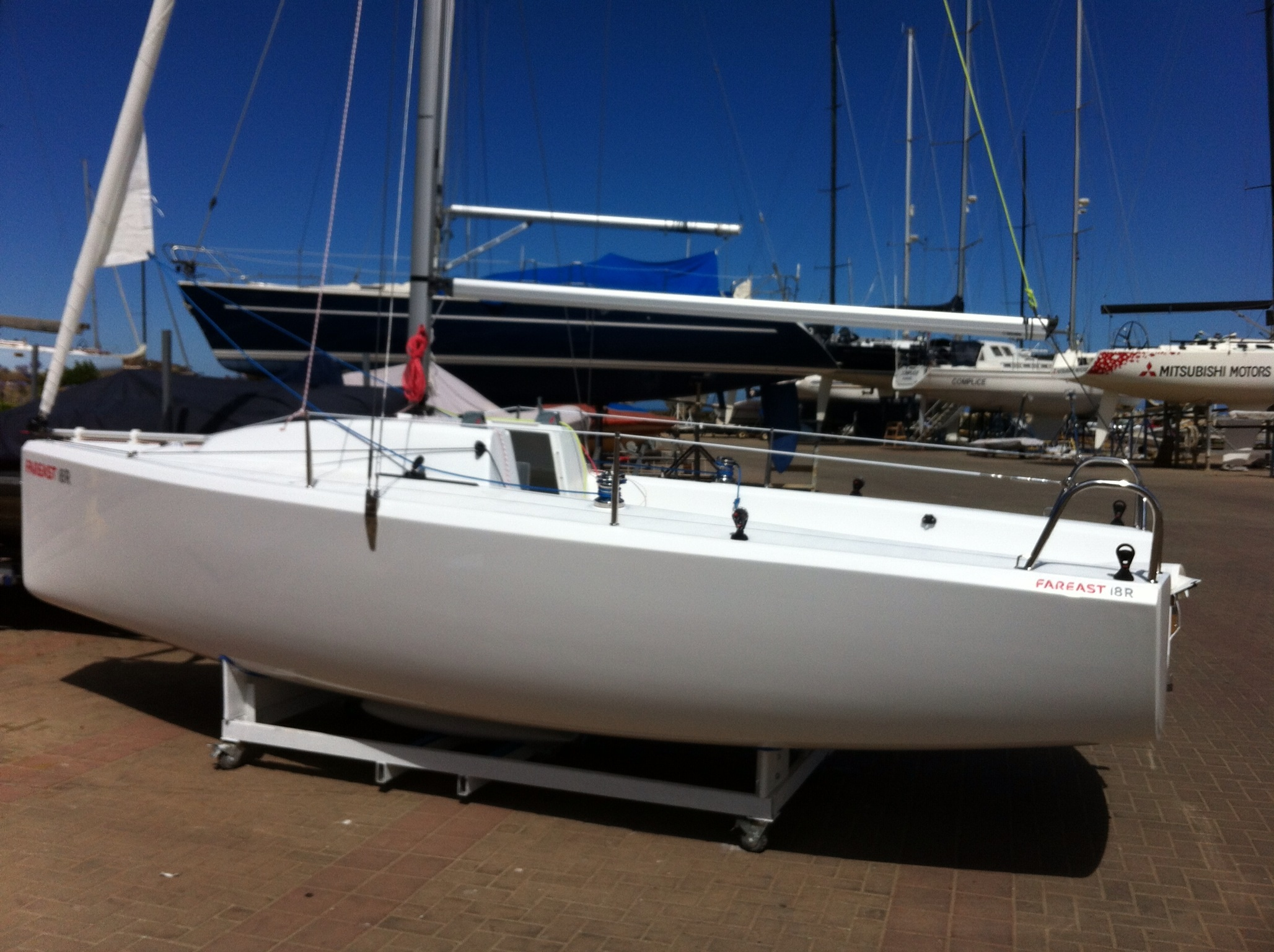

Development
- Designer: Simonis-Voogd
- Year: 2013
- Name: Fareast 18R

Boat
- Crew: 2-4
- Draft: 1.20m (max)

Hull
- Type: Monohull
- Construction: GRP
- LOA: 5.80 m (19.0 ft)
- LOH: 5.61m
- LWL: 5.15m
- Beam: 2.20 m (7 ft 3 in)

Hull appendages
- Keel: Lifting keel

Rig
- Rig type: Fractional

Sails
- Mainsail area: 13.1m2
- Jib/genoa area: 8.8m2
- Spinnaker area: 28.2m2

The Fareast 18R is a modern sailboat designed by Simonis-Voogd and built by Far East Boats in Shanghai, China. It features a lifting keel with a lead bulb, a roller furling jib, a bowsprit for an asymmetrical spinnaker, and an open deck. It can be raced with a crew of 3.

A variation of the Fareast 18R, the Fareast 18 shares the same hull, rig, and sailplan, but features a small cabin in lieu of a reduced deck.

The Fareast 18R / 18 has been recognized with the "2014 Best Boat" award by Sail magazine, and was also nominated to the "2014 Boat of the Year" award by Sailing World magazine.

== Design ==
The Fareast 18R was designed by Simonis-Voogd. The Dutch-South African naval architecture firm, formed by Alexander Simonis and Martin Voogd, has created more than 200 designs, including various Dehler keelboats, and the Nicorette II and Nicorette III megayachts, winners of the Sydney to Hobart Yacht Race.
