= Kelt 7.6 =

Sailboat class

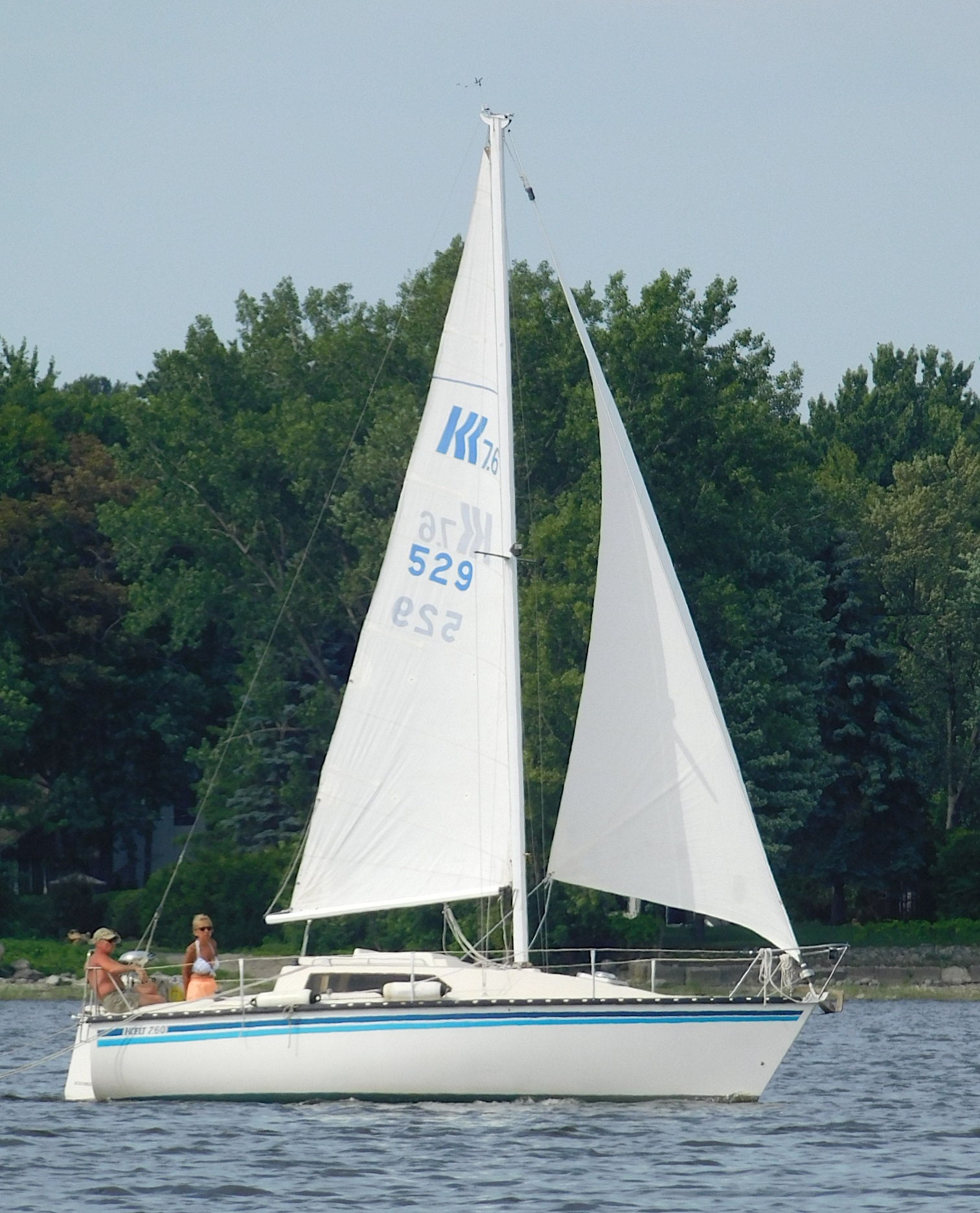

Development
- Designer: Jean Berret
- Location: France
- Year: 1980
- No. built: 489
- Builder: Kelt Marine
- Name: Kelt 7.6

Boat
- Displacement: 4,188 lb (1,900 kg)
- Draft: 5.25 ft (1.60 m)

Hull
- Type: Monohull
- Construction: Fiberglass
- LOA: 24.93 ft (7.60 m)
- LWL: 21.00 ft (6.40 m)
- Beam: 9.44 ft (2.88 m)

Hull appendages
- Keel: fin keel
- Ballast: 1,631 lb (740 kg)
- Rudder: transom-mounted rudder

Rig
- General: Masthead sloop
- I foretriangle height: 30.45 ft (9.28 m)
- J foretriangle base: 10.16 ft (3.10 m)
- P mainsail luff: 25.73 ft (7.84 m)
- E mainsail foot: 9.18 ft (2.80 m)

Sails
- Mainsail area: 118.10 sq ft (10.972 m^{2})
- Jib/genoa area: 154.69 sq ft (14.371 m^{2})
- Total sail area: 272.79 sq ft (25.343 m^{2})

Racing
- PHRF: 216 (average)

The Kelt 7.6 (or Kelt 7.60) is a French trailerable sailboat, that was designed by Jean Berret and first built in 1980.

The design was developed by Vandestadt and McGruer Limited into the Sirius 26 in 1987.

== Production ==
The boat was built by Kelt Marine in France and also in Canada between 1980 and 1984, with a total of 489 examples completed, but it is now out of production.

== Design ==
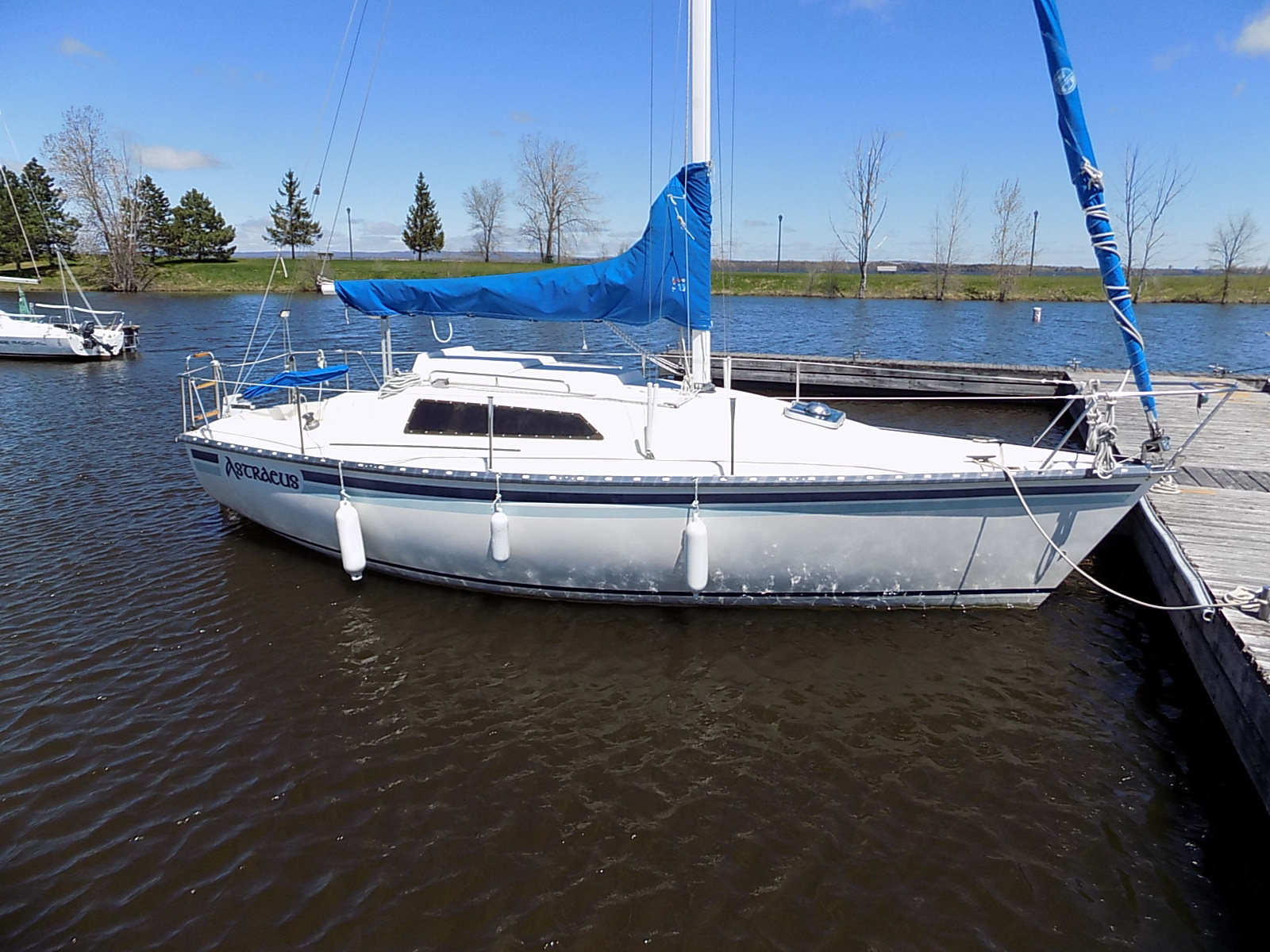
Kelt 7.6

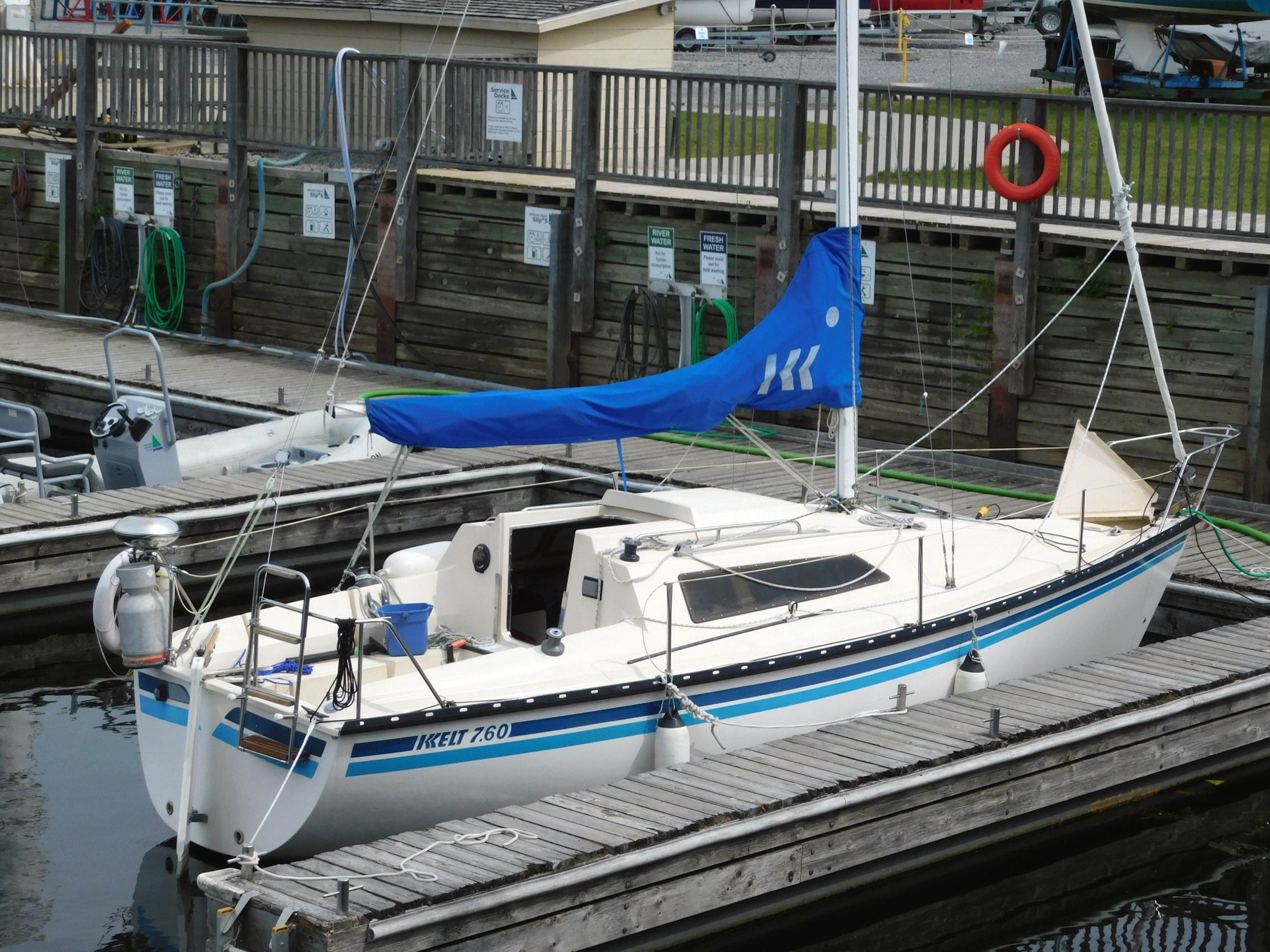
Kelt 7.6

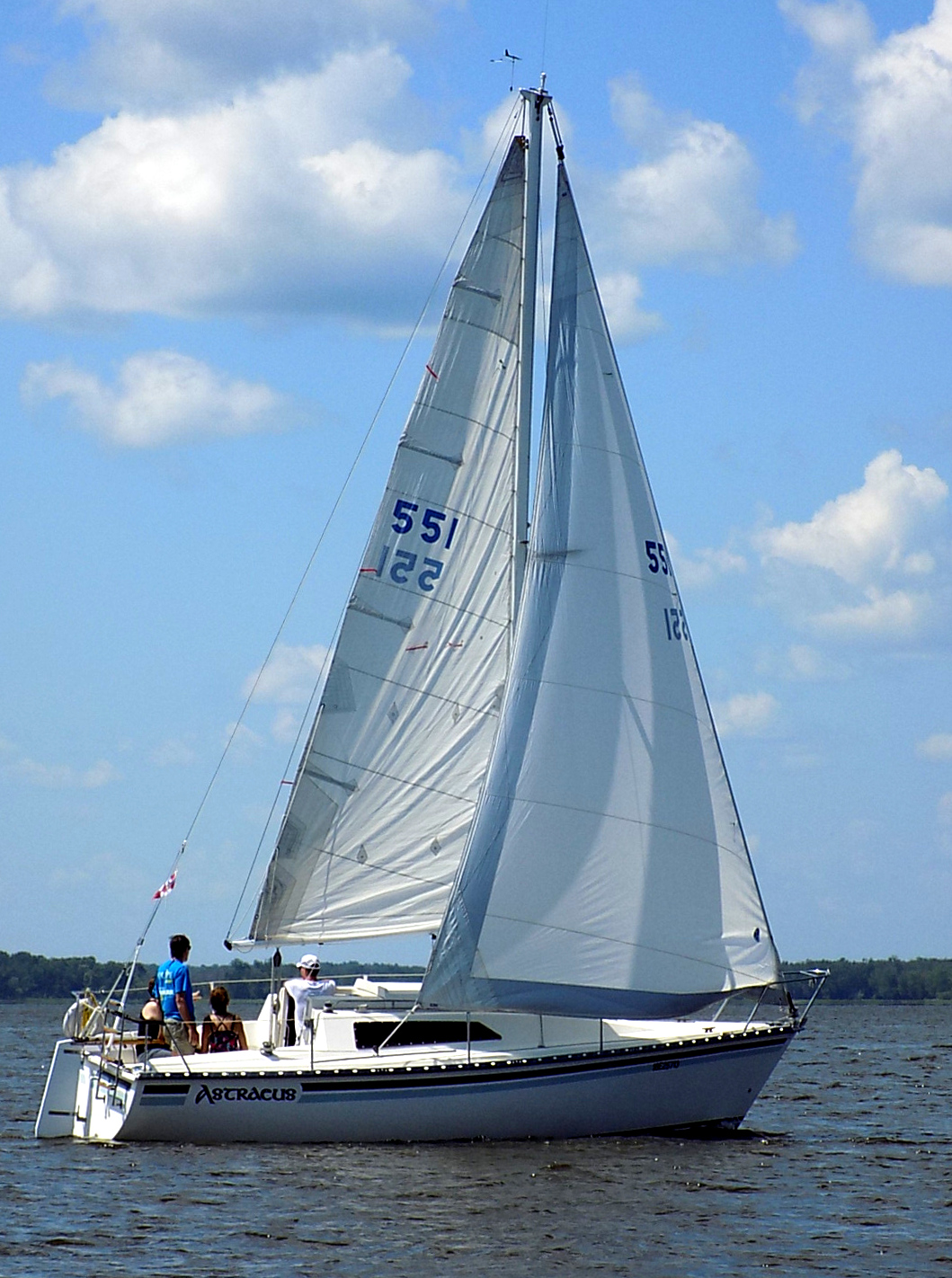
Kelt 7.6

The Kelt 7.6 is a small recreational keelboat, built predominantly of fiberglass. It has a masthead sloop rig, a transom-hung rudder and a fixed fin keel. It displaces 4,188 lb (1,900 kg) and carries 1,631 lb (740 kg) of ballast.

The design has a draft of 5.25 ft (1.60 m) with the standard keel fitted.

The boat is normally fitted with a small 6 to 10 hp (4 to 7 kW) outboard motor for docking and maneuvering.

The design has sleeping accommodation for four people, with a double "V"-berth in the bow cabin and two straight settee berths in the main cabin. The galley is located on the port side just forward of the companionway ladder and is equipped with a two-burner stove, icebox and a sink. A navigation station is opposite the galley, on the starboard side. The head is located just aft of the navigation station on the starboard side. Cabin headroom is 67 in (170 cm).

The boat has a PHRF racing average handicap of 216 with a high of 210 and low of 222. It has a hull speed of 6.69 kn (12.39 km/h).

== Operational history ==
In a review Michael McGoldrick wrote, "The Kelt 7.6 ... won the very prestigious "boat of the year" award at the 1980 Paris Boat Show. The Kelt successfully squeezed a lot of living space, including an aft head and a real chart table, in seaworthy and modern looking 25 footer. Because these boats were built in the mid-1980s, the Kelt is one of the newer 25 footer that can be found on the Canadian used market."

In a 2010 review Steve Henkel wrote, "best features: The Kelt wins the Space Index sweepstakes among her comp[etitor]s, bolstered by a combination of widest beam and relatively good headroom. Her small mainsail relative to her foretriangle, along with her low masthead, should make her easy to handle in heavy air despite her low D/L ratio. Worst features: None noted."

== See also ==
- List of sailing boat types
