= Gin Fizz 37 =

French sailboat class

Development
- Designer: Michel Joubert
- Location: France
- Year: 1974
- No. built: 494
- Builders: Jeanneau; Gibert Marine
- Role: Cruiser
- Name: Gin Fizz 37

Boat
- Displacement: 15,300 lb (6,940 kg)
- Draft: 6.20 ft (1.89 m)

Hull
- Type: monohull
- Construction: fiberglass
- LOA: 37.40 ft (11.40 m)
- LWL: 30.00 ft (9.14 m)
- Beam: 12.30 ft (3.75 m)
- Engine: Perkins Engines 4-108 30 hp (22 kW) diesel engine

Hull appendages
- Keel: fin keel
- Ballast: 5,952 lb (2,700 kg)
- Rudder: skeg-mounted rudder

Rig
- Rig type: Bermuda rig

Sails
- Sailplan: masthead sloop
- Mainsail area: 291 sq ft (27.0 m^{2})
- Jib/genoa area: 199 sq ft (18.5 m^{2})
- Spinnaker area: 1,184 sq ft (110.0 m^{2})
- Other sails: genoa: 544 sq ft (50.5 m^{2}) solent: 291 sq ft (27.0 m^{2}) storm jib: 97 sq ft (9.0 m^{2})
- Upwind sail area: 834 sq ft (77.5 m^{2})
- Downwind sail area: 1,475 sq ft (137.0 m^{2})

The Gin Fizz 37 is a French sailboat that was designed by Michel Joubert of the Joubert-Nivelt design firm, as a cruiser and first built in 1974.

== Production ==
The design was built by Jeanneau and also by Gibert Marine in France, from 1974 until 1981 with 494 boats completed, but it is now out of production. A number were imported into the United States.

== Design ==
The Gin Fizz 37 is a recreational keelboat, built predominantly of fiberglass, with wood trim. It has a masthead sloop rig or optional ketch rig, with a deck-stepped mast, two sets of straight spreaders and aluminum spars with stainless steel wire rigging. The hull has a raked stem, a reverse transom, a skeg-mounted rudder controlled by a wheel and a fixed swept fin keel. Both center and aft cockpit models were built. It displaces 15,300 lb (6,940 kg) and carries 5,952 lb (2,700 kg) of iron ballast.

The boat has a draft of 6.20 ft (1.89 m) with the standard keel.

The boat is fitted with a British Perkins Engines 4-108 diesel engine of 30 hp (22 kW) for docking and maneuvering. The fuel tank holds 40 U.S. gallons (150 L; 33 imp gal) and the fresh water tank has a capacity of 80 U.S. gallons (300 L; 67 imp gal).

The design has sleeping accommodation for ten people, with a double "V"-berth in the bow cabin, an U-shaped settee and a straight settee in the main cabin along with two pipe berths and an aft cabin with a double berth. The galley is located on the starboard side at the companionway ladder. The galley is L-shaped and is equipped with a three-burner stove, an ice box and a double sink. A navigation station is opposite the galley, on the port side. The head is located just aft of the bow cabin on the port side and includes a shower. Cabin maximum headroom is 73 in (185 cm), with the aft cabin headroom 55 in (140 cm).

For sailing downwind the design may be equipped with a symmetrical spinnaker of 1,184 sq ft (110.0 m^{2}).

The design has a hull speed of 7.34 kn (13.59 km/h).

== Operational history ==
In a 2007 review for Sailing magazine, John Kretschmer wrote, "the boat is a capable cruiser with ideal accommodations for a couple, or small family. It is well built, looks nice when you row out to her on the mooring and is extremely affordable."

A review in Blue Water Boats stated, "the Jeanneau Gin Fizz is saltier than its name might suggest. Peddled by the fledgling Jeanneau company in the late 1970's she's a 37 ft 6 inch fibreglass production cruiser, designed by Michel Joubert, that has earned a credible reputation as an affordable offshore passage maker. Although not a classic blue water cruiser, the Gin Fizz has proved her mettle on a number of circumnavigations and plentiful ocean crossings."

== See also ==
- List of sailing boat types
