= Hunter 26 =

Sailboat class

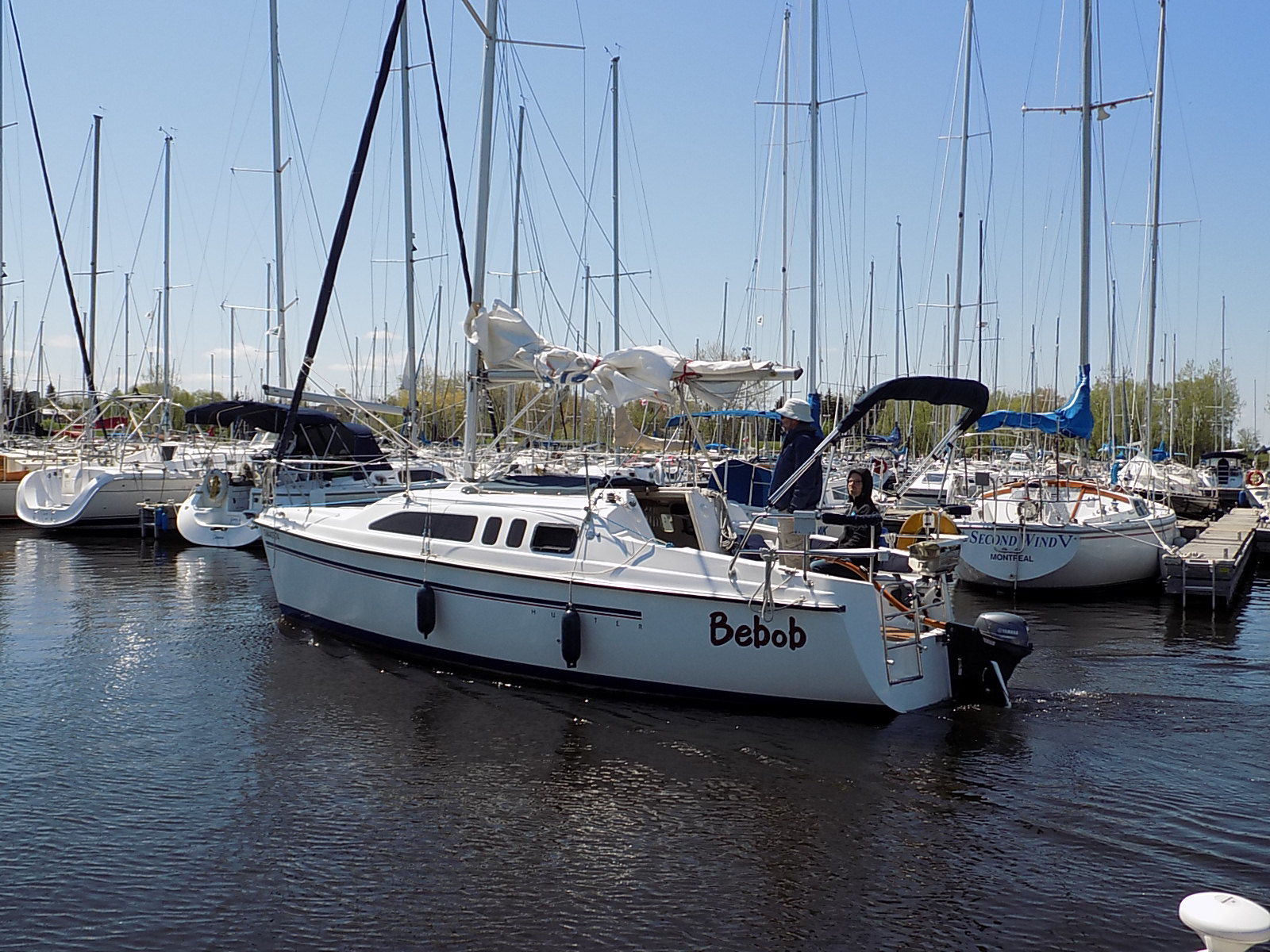

Development
- Designer: Rob Mazza
- Location: United States
- Year: 1994
- Builder: Hunter Marine
- Name: Hunter 26

Boat
- Displacement: 4,600 lb (2,087 kg)
- Draft: 6.00 ft (1.83 m) with the centerboard down

Hull
- Type: Monohull
- Construction: Fiberglass
- LOA: 25.75 ft (7.85 m)
- LWL: 23.16 ft (7.06 m)
- Beam: 9.00 ft (2.74 m)
- Engine: Outboard motor

Hull appendages
- Keel: Centerboard
- Ballast: 2,000 lb (907 kg)
- Rudder: transom-mounted rudder

Rig
- Rig type: Bermuda rig
- I foretriangle height: 28.33 ft (8.63 m)
- J foretriangle base: 9.42 ft (2.87 m)
- P mainsail luff: 30.08 ft (9.17 m)
- E mainsail foot: 10.50 ft (3.20 m)

Sails
- Sailplan: Fractional rigged sloop
- Mainsail area: 157.92 sq ft (14.671 m^{2})
- Jib/genoa area: 133.43 sq ft (12.396 m^{2})
- Total sail area: 291.35 sq ft (27.067 m^{2})

The Hunter 26 is an American trailerable sailboat, that was designed by Rob Mazza and first built in 1994.

== Production ==
The boat was built by Hunter Marine in the United States from 1994 to 1997, but it is now out of production.

The Hunter 26 design was developed into the similar Hunter 260 in 1997.

== Design ==
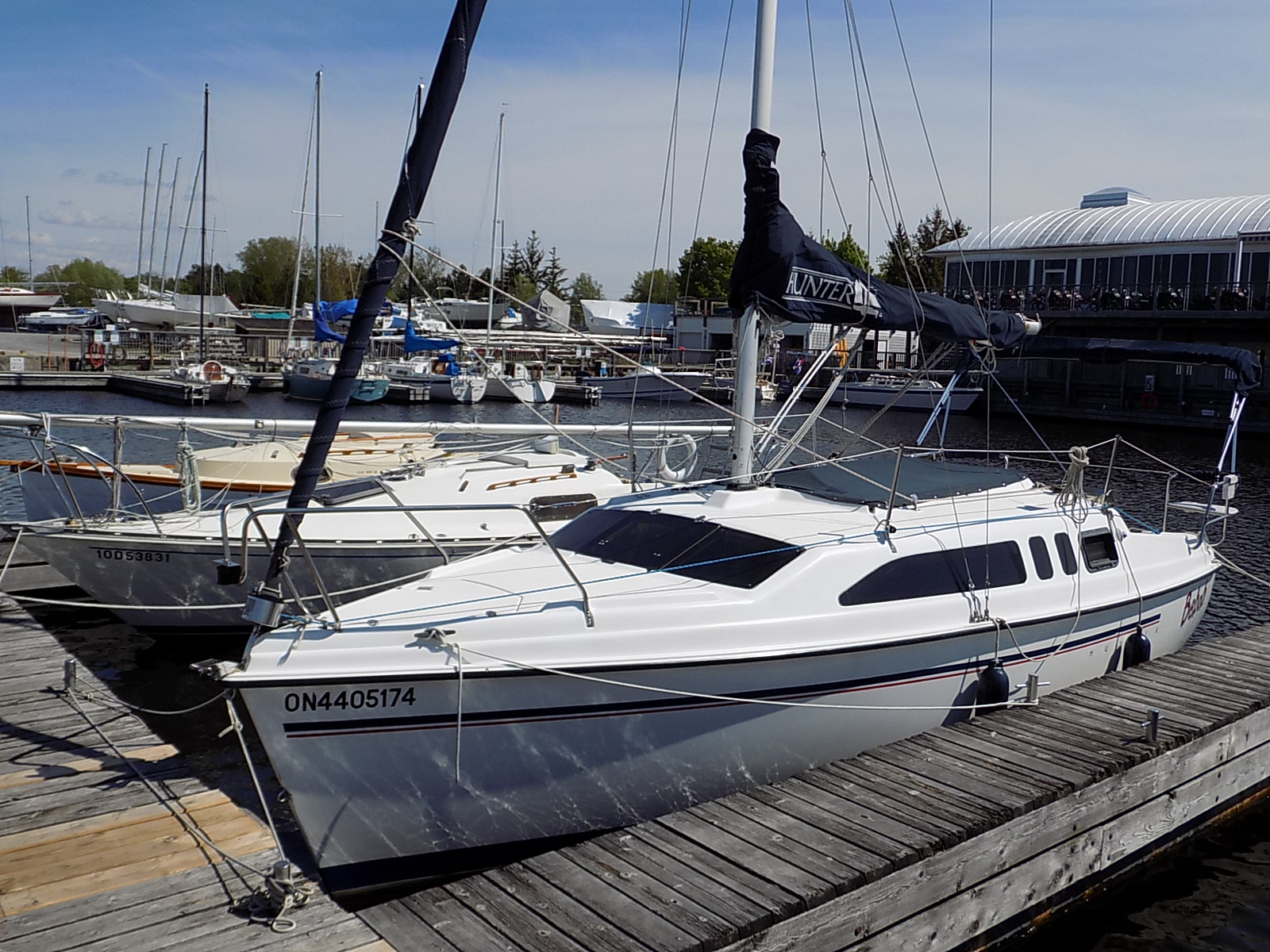
Hunter 26

The Hunter 26 is a small recreational keelboat, built predominantly of fiberglass. It has a fractional sloop rig, a raked stem, a reverse transom, a transom-hung rudder and a centerboard. It displaces 4,600 lb (2,087 kg) and carries 2,000 lb (907 kg) of flooding water ballast. The ballast is drained for road transport.

The boat has a draft of 6.00 ft (1.83 m) with the centerboard extended and 1.75 ft (0.53 m) retracted, allowing beaching or ground transportation on a trailer.

The boat is normally fitted with a small outboard motor for docking and maneuvering.

The design has a hull speed of 6.44 kn (11.93 km/h).

== See also ==
- List of sailing boat types

Related development

- Hunter 260

Similar sailboats

- Beneteau First 26
- Beneteau First 265
- C&C 26
- C&C 26 Wave
- Contessa 26
- Dawson 26
- Discovery 7.9
- Grampian 26
- Herreshoff H-26
- Hunter 26.5
- Hunter 260
- MacGregor 26
- Mirage 26
- Nash 26
- Nonsuch 26
- Outlaw 26
- Paceship PY 26
- Pearson 26
- Parker Dawson 26
- Sandstream 26
- Tanzer 26
- Yamaha 26
