= Bluejacket 23 =

Recreational keelboat and MORC racer

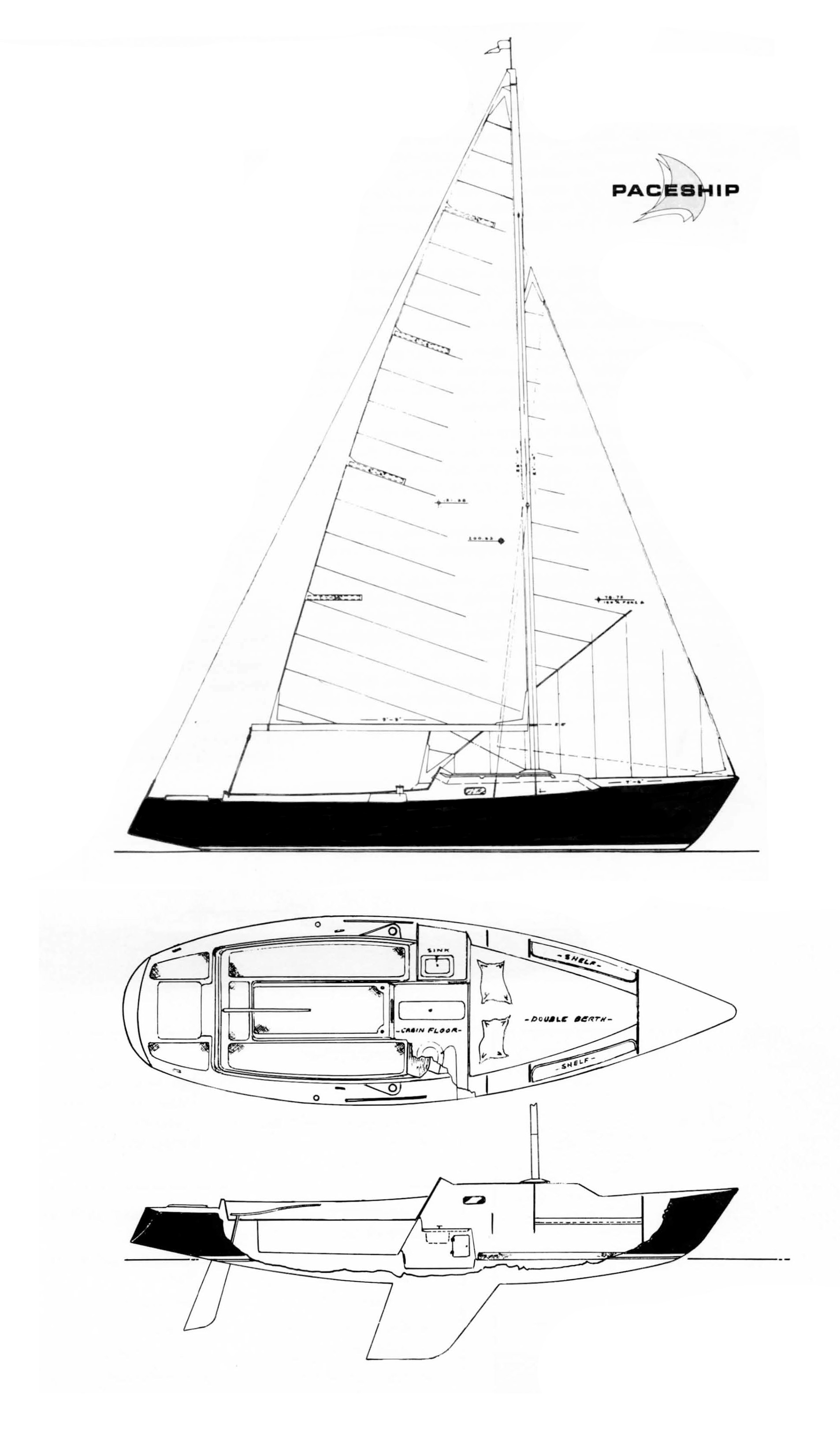
- MORCEE version shown

Development
- Designer: Cuthbertson & Cassian (C&C Designs)
- Location: Canada
- Year: 1967 - 1974
- No. built: 107
- Builder: Paceship Yachts
- Role: Daysailer and Midget Ocean Racing Club Rule (MORC) Racer
- Name: Bluejacket 23

Boat
- Displacement: 2,000 lb (907 kg)
- Draft: 3.75 ft (1.14 m)
- Air draft: 29.5 ft (9.0 m)

Hull
- Type: Monohull
- Construction: Fiberglass
- LOA: 22.83 ft (6.96 m)
- LWL: 17.50 ft (5.33 m)
- Beam: 7.00 ft (2.13 m)
- Engine: Outboard motor in well

Hull appendages
- Keel: Fin keel
- Ballast: 900 lb (408 kg)
- Rudder: Spade rudder

Rig
- General: Bermuda Fractional rig, deck stepped mast
- I foretriangle height: 21.00 ft (6.40 m)
- J foretriangle base: 7.50 ft (2.29 m)
- P mainsail luff: 25.00 ft (7.62 m)
- E mainsail foot: 9.8 ft (3.0 m)

Sails
- Sailplan: Fractional Sloop
- Mainsail area: 78.75 sq ft (7.316 m^{2})
- Jib/genoa area: 122.5 sq ft (11.38 m^{2})
- Upwind sail area: 201.25 sq ft (18.697 m^{2})

Racing
- Class association: MORC
- PHRF: 243

The Bluejacket 23 is a recreational keelboat built by Paceship Yachts in Mahone Bay, Nova Scotia, Canada. At least 107 were built, from 1967 to 1974.

The Bluejacket was first offered in the daysailer version, with a roomy cockpit and an open cuddy. In 1970 the MORCEE version was offered, adapted to comply with the Midget Ocean Racing Club Rule (MORC) by fitting a self-bailing cockpit and enclosed cabin.

== Design ==
Designed by Cuthbertson & Cassian, it is similar to several other Cuthbertson & Cassian designs built in Ontario around the same time, including the Classic 22 by Grampian Marine (which predated the Bluejacket), and the Viking 22 and later Gazelle 22 from Ontario Yachts.

=== Hull ===
The hull, deck and interior liners are built by the hand-layup method using polyester resins, 1/2 oz/sq yd (16.95 g/m^{2}) mat and 24 oz/sq yd (813.7 g/m^{2}) roving throughout the boat. Positive flotation is provided by large blocks of foam contained inside the cockpit seats and in the bow. The deck is reinforced with plywood that is sandwiched into the laminate.

The boat has a draft of 3.75 ft (1.14 m). It displaces 2,000 lb (907 kg) and carries 900 lb (408 kg) of iron ballast. The Bluejacket 23 has a theoretical hull speed of 5.61 kn (10.39 km/h). The design has a PHRF racing average handicap of 240 and a hull speed of 5.6 kn (10.4 km/h).

=== Keel ===
The fin keel is of cast iron with a double resin coating to prevent corrosion and is of a hydrodynamic design supplying maximum lift with good stability. The keel is mounted to the hull and has a separate moulded keel grid that provides greater strength in this area. The keel is attached with 3/4 in (19 mm) stainless steel flat head bolts, nuts and flat washers. No gasket is used to mount the keel as the mating surfaces are well matched. Keels are mounted at the factory using a silicone marine sealer between the keel and hull.

=== Rudder ===
The rudder is a spade type made of fiberglass with a brass rudder stock. The rudder port is a bronze tube with bushings top and bottom. Steering is by tiller. The tiller head is cast bronze and is held on with a pin. This pin passes horizontally through the head and stock. An allen screw locks into a key in the rudder stock. The tiller is straight grained ash. The rudder can be rotated a full 360 degrees if needed.

=== Deck hardware ===
The Bluejacket 23 has deck hardware of stainless steel, Marinium, and chromed brass. Fiberglass winch bases mount two No.1 snubbing winches used for headsail sheeting. All hardware is either bolted through or tapped into metal which is bonded into the laminate.

The boat includes running lights, interior light, switches, wiring, fuse box, battery and case.

=== Rig and sail plan ===
The anodized aluminum deck stepped mast and boom are aluminum type 6351 alloy and have integral sail slots and non-geared roller reefing.

Standing rigging is 1 x 19 stainless steel wire rope (breaking strength 2,100 lb (953 kg)) with swage terminals, stainless steel turnbuckles and chain plates. Running rigging is of Samson braid, including jib sheets and main sheet. Halyards are stainless steel having dacron rope tails.

The fractional rig comes equipped with a 122.5 sq ft (11.38 m^{2}) mainsail as well as a working jib as standard equipment. A No. 1 Genoa and a Spinnaker are optional.

=== Trim ===
All wood trim is No. 1 grade, oiled teak and includes hand rails on cabin, cabin trim, cockpit trim and rub rails. The tiller is straight grained ash.

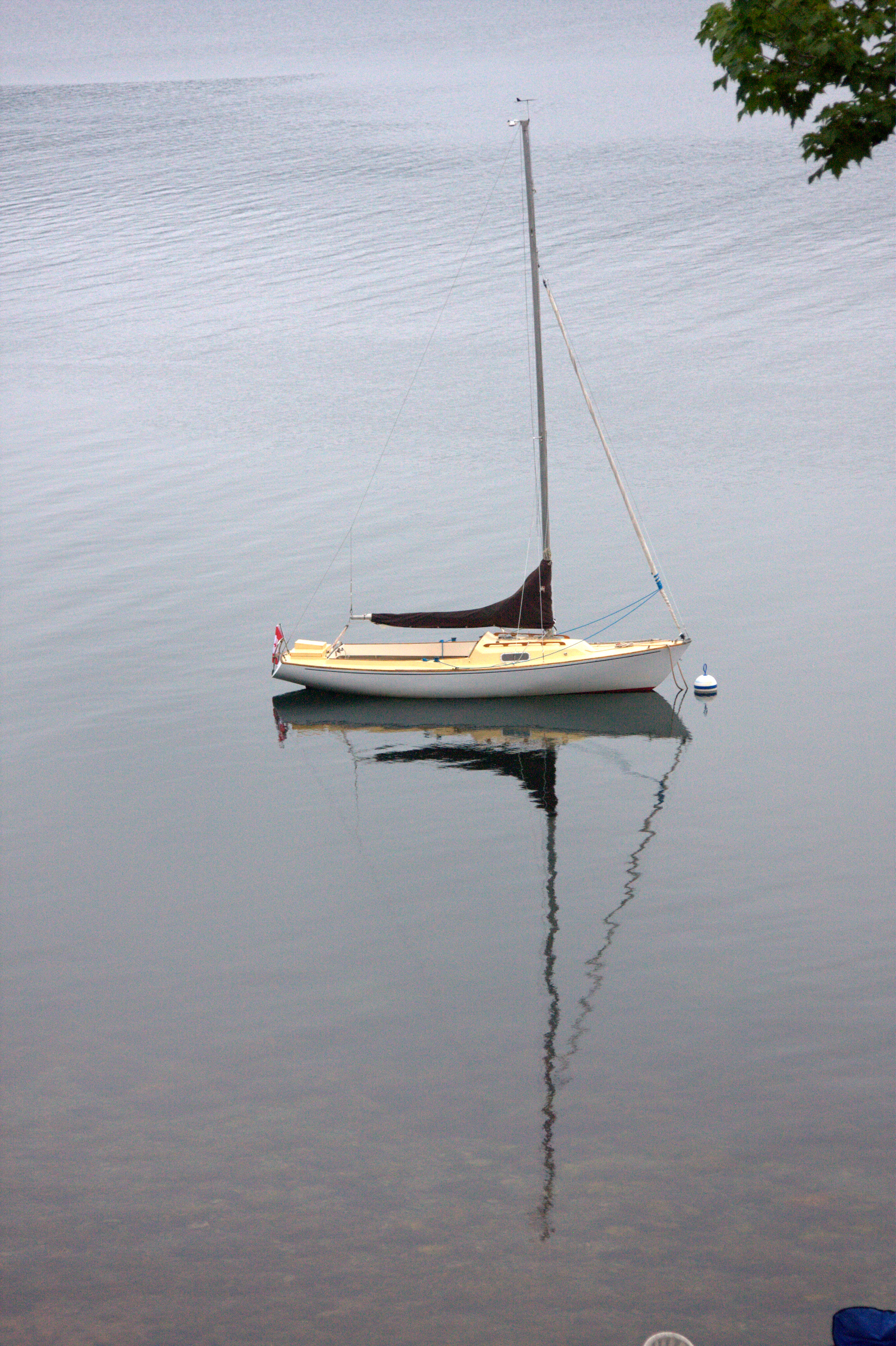
Bluejacket 23 at anchor on the Bras d'Or Lake.

=== Motor well ===
The lazarette contains a built in outboard well, which includes access hatch and well plug. This well is bulkheaded off from the main hull and is of the self-draining, non-filling type. There is an access door through the bulkhead for outboard operation [recommended 3 - 6 H.P. (not supplied)]. A shelf for gasoline tanks and a well plug that fairs the well opening in the hull for racing is supplied. The well can take on water in some conditions. The manufacturer recommend minimizing this by removing the motor from the well when not in use, inserting the drain plug when under way.

== MORC version accommodations ==
The cabin is fully enclosed and has two fixed lights in the cabin top for visibility and interior illumination. The companionway closes with teak hatch slides. Forward a double V berth is raised a few inches above the cabin sole and is fitted with two 3" foam cushions. To port, supplied as standard, is a galley unit with sink and integral water tank filled through a plug located in one corner. To starboard, provision has been made for installation of a marine head (optional). Two forward utility shelves are moulded above the berths. There is a small hatch in the cabin sole top access the bilge. Cabin headroom is 37 in (94 cm).
