= Spirit 23 =

1970s American recreational keelboat

Development
- Designer: Robert Finch
- Location: United States
- Year: 1978
- Builder: Glastron
- Role: Cruiser

Boat
- Displacement: 2,800 lb (1,270 kg)
- Draft: 5.00 ft (1.52 m) with centerboard down

Hull
- Type: monohull
- Construction: fiberglass
- LOA: 23.00 ft (7.01 m)
- LWL: 20.00 ft (6.10 m)
- Beam: 7.92 ft (2.41 m)
- Engine: outboard motor

Hull appendages
- Keel: stub keel and centerboard
- Ballast: 800 lb (363 kg)
- Rudder: transom-mounted rudder

Rig
- Rig type: Bermuda rig
- I foretriangle height: 25.00 ft (7.62 m)
- J foretriangle base: 8.67 ft (2.64 m)
- P mainsail luff: 22.50 ft (6.86 m)
- E mainsail foot: 9.50 ft (2.90 m)

Sails
- Sailplan: masthead sloop
- Mainsail area: 106.88 sq ft (9.929 m^{2})
- Jib/genoa area: 108.38 sq ft (10.069 m^{2})
- Total sail area: 215.25 sq ft (19.997 m^{2})

Racing
- PHRF: 240

The Spirit 23, also called the North American 23, is an American sailboat that was designed by Robert Finch as a cruiser and first built in 1978.

== Production ==
The design was built by Glastron in the United States, starting in 1976, initially by their North American Yachts subsidiary in Henderson, Tennessee, as the North American 23. Morgan Yachts, builders of the North American 40, threatened a lawsuit over the naming, resulting in North American Yachts being sold and the boat being built starting in 1978 by a different Glastron subsidiary, Spirit Yachts, in Austin, Texas as the Spirit 23. Production was ended in 1981.

== Design ==
The Spirit 23 is a recreational keelboat, built predominantly of fiberglass, with wood trim and an optional cabin "pop-top" for increased headroom. It has a masthead sloop rig, a raked stem, a reverse transom, a transom-hung rudder controlled by a tiller and a stub keel with a retractable centerboard or with a fixed fin keel. A "kick-up" rudder was a factory option.

The boat is normally fitted with a small 3 to 6 hp (2 to 4 kW) outboard motor for docking and maneuvering.

The design has sleeping accommodation for four people, with a double "V"-berth in the bow cabin, a drop-down dinette and a straight settee in the main cabin. An alternate main cabin plan provided two settee berths in place of the dinette. In this latter arrangement the starboard berth is 10.0 ft (3.0 m) long. The galley is located on the starboard side just aft of the bow cabin and is equipped with a two-burner stove and a sink. The head is located in the bow cabin on the port side under the "V"-berth. Cabin headroom is 57 in (145 cm) or 74 in (188 cm) with the optional "pop-top" open.

The design has a PHRF racing average handicap of 240 and a hull speed of 6.0 kn (11.1 km/h).

== Variants ==
North American 23
Original model built from 1976 to 1978 and equipped with a stub keel and centerboard. It displaces 2,800 lb (1,270 kg) and carries 800 lb (363 kg) of ballast. The boat has a draft of 5.00 ft (1.52 m) with the centerboard down and 2.00 ft (0.61 m) with it retracted.
Spirit 23
This centerboard model is the re-designated North American 23, introduced in 1978 under this name and built until 1981. It displaces 2,800 lb (1,270 kg) and carries 800 lb (363 kg) of ballast. The boat has a draft of 5.00 ft (1.52 m) with the centerboard down and 2.00 ft (0.61 m) with it retracted.
Spirit 23 K
This fixed keel model was introduced in 1978 and built until 1981. It has a swept fin keel, a taller mast with more sail area, a mid-cockpit mainsheet traveler and a one-piece rudder made from fiberglass. It displaces 3,150 lb (1,429 kg) and carries 1,150 lb (522 kg) of lead ballast. The boat has a draft of 3.50 ft (1.07 m).
