= Triangle 20 =

1960s Canadian recreational keelboat

Development
- Designer: Charles Angle
- Location: Canada
- Year: 1961
- No. built: 75
- Builder: Grampian Marine
- Role: Cruiser
- Name: Triangle 20

Boat
- Displacement: 2,300 lb (1,043 kg)
- Draft: 4.75 ft (1.45 m) with centreboard down

Hull
- Type: monohull
- Construction: fibreglass
- LOA: 20.50 ft (6.25 m)
- LWL: 16.67 ft (5.08 m)
- Beam: 7.08 ft (2.16 m)
- Engine: outboard motor

Hull appendages
- Keel: fin keel
- Ballast: 800 lb (363 kg)
- Rudder: keel-mounted rudder

Rig
- Rig type: Bermuda rig

Sails
- Sailplan: fractional rigged sloop
- Total sail area: 205.00 sq ft (19.045 m^{2})

The Triangle 20 is a recreational keelboat built by Grampian Marine in Canada, from 1961 to 1963, with 75 boats completed. It was also sold in the US by the designer's company, Triangle Marine. It was sold complete or as a kit, for owner completion.

The fibreglass hull has a raked stem, a plumb transom, a keel-mounted rudder controlled by a tiller and a fixed stub long keel, with a retractable centreboard. It has a draft of 4.75 ft (1.45 m) with the centreboard extended and 2.17 ft (0.66 m) with it retracted. It has a hull speed of 5.5 kn (10.2 km/h).

The design has sleeping accommodation for two people, with a double "V"-berth in the bow. The galley is located on the starboard side, just forward of the companionway ladder. The galley is equipped with a two-burner stove and an ice box. The head is located opposite the galley on the port side and includes a sink that drains into the toilet. Cabin headroom is 54 in (137 cm).

It has a fractional sloop rig.
