= Classic 22 =

Sailboat class

Development
- Designer: George Harding Cuthbertson
- Location: Canada
- Year: 1962
- Builder: Grampian Marine
- Role: Racer-Cruiser

Boat
- Displacement: 1,892 lb (858 kg)
- Draft: 3.75 ft (1.14 m)

Hull
- Type: monohull
- Construction: fibreglass
- LOA: 22.16 ft (6.75 m)
- LWL: 17.50 ft (5.33 m)
- Beam: 7.00 ft (2.13 m)

Hull appendages
- Keel: fin keel
- Ballast: 890 lb (404 kg)
- Rudder: internally-mounted spade-type rudder

Rig
- Rig type: Bermuda rig
- I foretriangle height: 21.00 ft (6.40 m)
- J foretriangle base: 7.50 ft (2.29 m)
- P mainsail luff: 23.71 ft (7.23 m)
- E mainsail foot: 9.75 ft (2.97 m)

Sails
- Sailplan: fractional rigged sloop
- Mainsail area: 115.59 sq ft (10.739 m^{2})
- Jib/genoa area: 78.75 sq ft (7.316 m^{2})
- Total sail area: 194.34 sq ft (18.055 m^{2})

Racing
- PHRF: 234

The Classic 22 is a Canadian trailerable sailboat that was designed by George Harding Cuthbertson of C&C Design, as a racer, daysailer and overnighter, first built in 1962.

The design was later developed into the Viking 22, Bluejacket 23 and the Gazelle 22.

The design was originally marketed by the manufacturer as the Classic 22, but was later sold as the Grampian Classic 22 and the Grampian 22 in slightly lightened versions.

It can be confused with the 1989 Classic 22 (Windley) design, which was also marketed as the Classic 22 by Classic Yachts.

== Production ==
The design was built by Grampian Marine in Canada, from 1962 until 1971, but it is now out of production.

== Design ==
The Classic 22 is a recreational keelboat, built predominantly of fibreglass, with wood trim. It has a fractional sloop rig; a raked stem; a raised counter, plumb transom; an internally mounted spade-type rudder controlled by a tiller and a fixed fin keel.

The boat has a draft of 3.75 ft (1.14 m) with the standard fin keel.

The design has sleeping accommodation for two people in a double "V"-berth in the bow cabin. The galley is located on port side of the cabin, just aft of the bow cabin and is equipped with a two-burner stove. The head is located just aft of the bow cabin on the starboard side. Cabin headroom is 41 in (104 cm).

The design has a PHRF racing average handicap of 234 and a hull speed of 5.6 kn (10.4 km/h).

== Variants ==
Classic 22
This model was introduced in 1962 and produced until about 1969. It displaces 1,892 lb (858 kg) and carries 890 lb (404 kg) of iron ballast.
Grampian 22
This model was introduced in about 1969 and produced until 1971. It displaces 1,650 lb (748 kg) and carries 850 lb (386 kg) of iron ballast.

== Operational history ==
The boat is supported by an active class club, the Grampian Owners Marina.

In a 2010 review Steve Henkel wrote, "even in 1962, the C&C 'look'” was apparent in this Grampian model. In her first year, she came in first in the keelboat class in the annual One-of-a-Kind regatta on Lake Ontario against more than ten other competitors, many with larger sail areas. Best features: A tall rig, high B/D ratio, ballast centered well below the waterline, and narrow hull all lead to good racing performance, similar to the J/22 ... The headroom may be low, but a big cockpit for daysailing and a single V-berth for two are the ingredients of a good overnighter ... And with her long overhangs and low silhouette, she looks quite graceful in a 'classic' way, we think. Worst features: Headroom is low and accommodation space minimal compared to her comp[etitor]s. She's also harder to launch and retrieve at a ramp, due to her fixed keel — as is the ]/22."

== See also ==
- List of sailing boat types

Related development

- Bluejacket 23
