= Grampian 30 =

Sailboat class

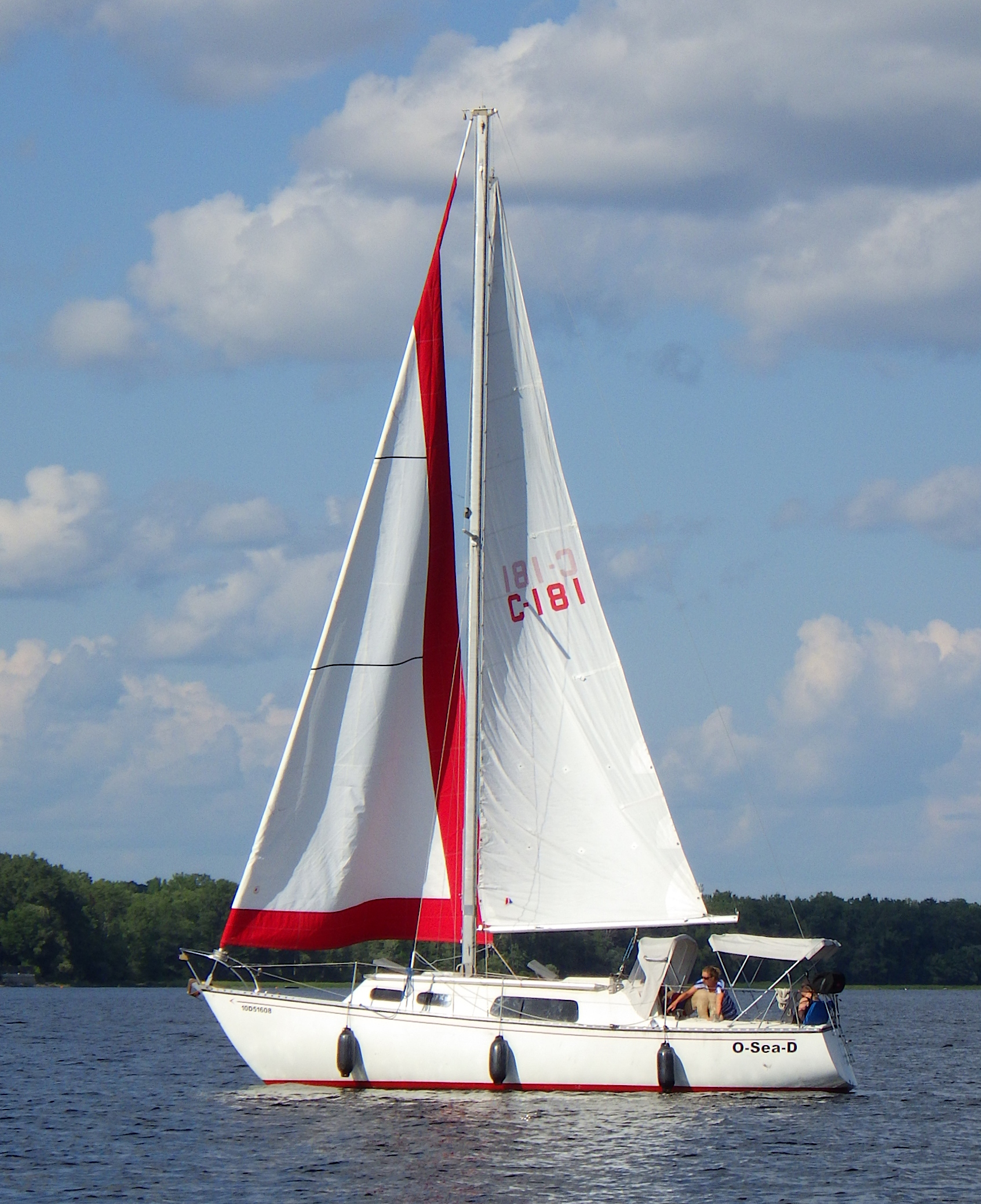

Development
- Designer: Alex McGruer
- Location: Canada
- Year: 1969
- No. built: 400
- Builder: Grampian Marine
- Name: Grampian 30

Boat
- Displacement: 8,600 lb (3,901 kg)
- Draft: 4.67 ft (1.42 m)

Hull
- Type: Monohull
- Construction: Fiberglass
- LOA: 29.75 ft (9.07 m)
- LWL: 25.50 ft (7.77 m)
- Beam: 9.50 ft (2.90 m)
- Engine: Universal Atomic 4 gasoline engine

Hull appendages
- Keel: fin keel
- Ballast: 3,870 lb (1,755 kg)
- Rudder: internally-mounted spade-type rudder

Rig
- Rig type: Bermuda rig
- I foretriangle height: 36.90 ft (11.25 m)
- J foretriangle base: 11.00 ft (3.35 m)
- P mainsail luff: 31.00 ft (9.45 m)
- E mainsail foot: 12.00 ft (3.66 m)

Sails
- Sailplan: Fractional rigged sloop
- Mainsail area: 202.95 sq ft (18.855 m^{2})
- Jib/genoa area: 186.00 sq ft (17.280 m^{2})
- Total sail area: 388.95 sq ft (36.135 m^{2})

The Grampian 30 is a Canadian sailboat, that was designed by Alex McGruer and first built in 1969.

== Production ==
The design was built by Grampian Marine in Canada between 1969 and 1977, with a total of 400 examples completed. The design is now out of production.

== Design ==
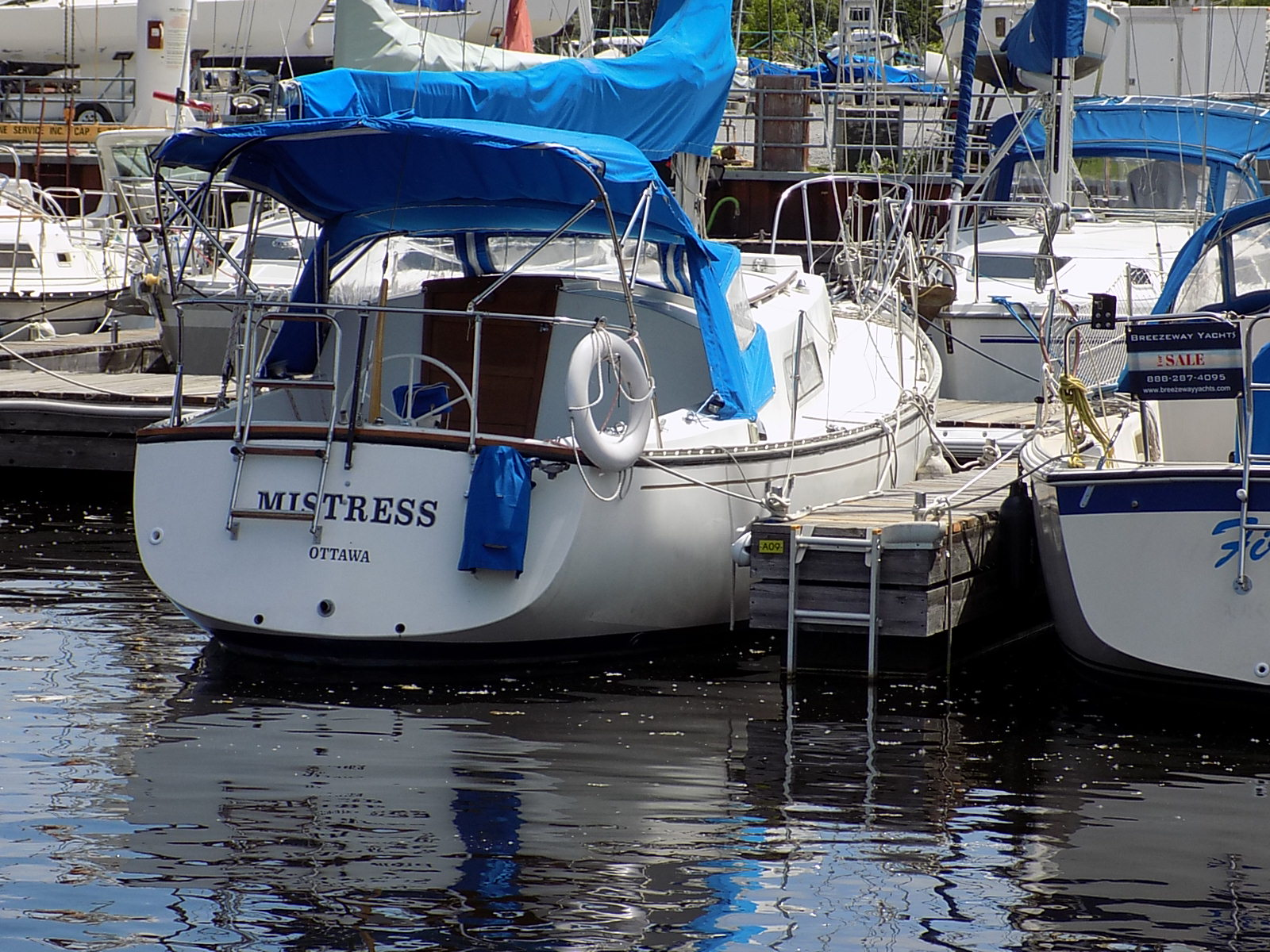
Grampian 30 transom view

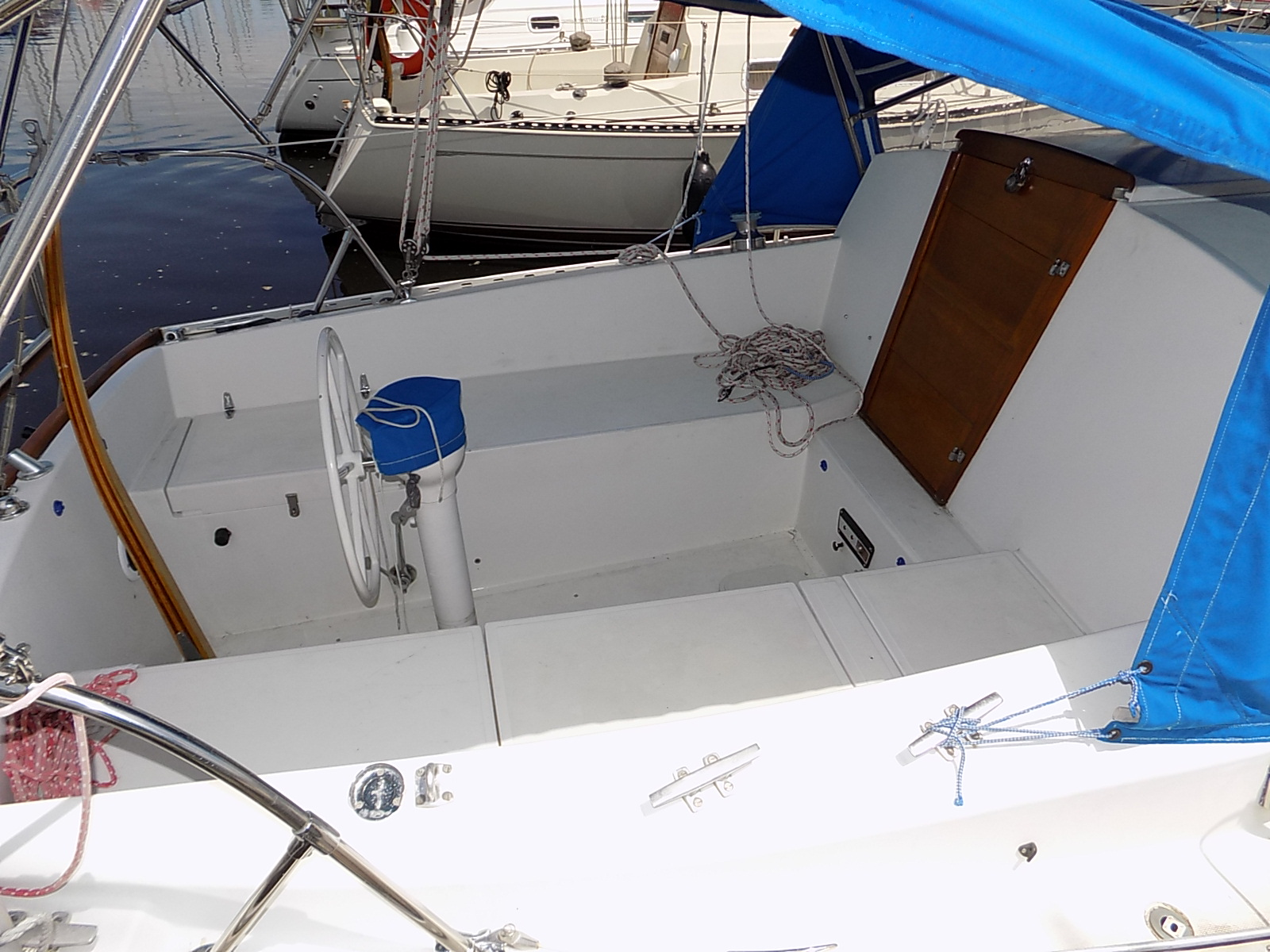
Grampian 30 cockpit

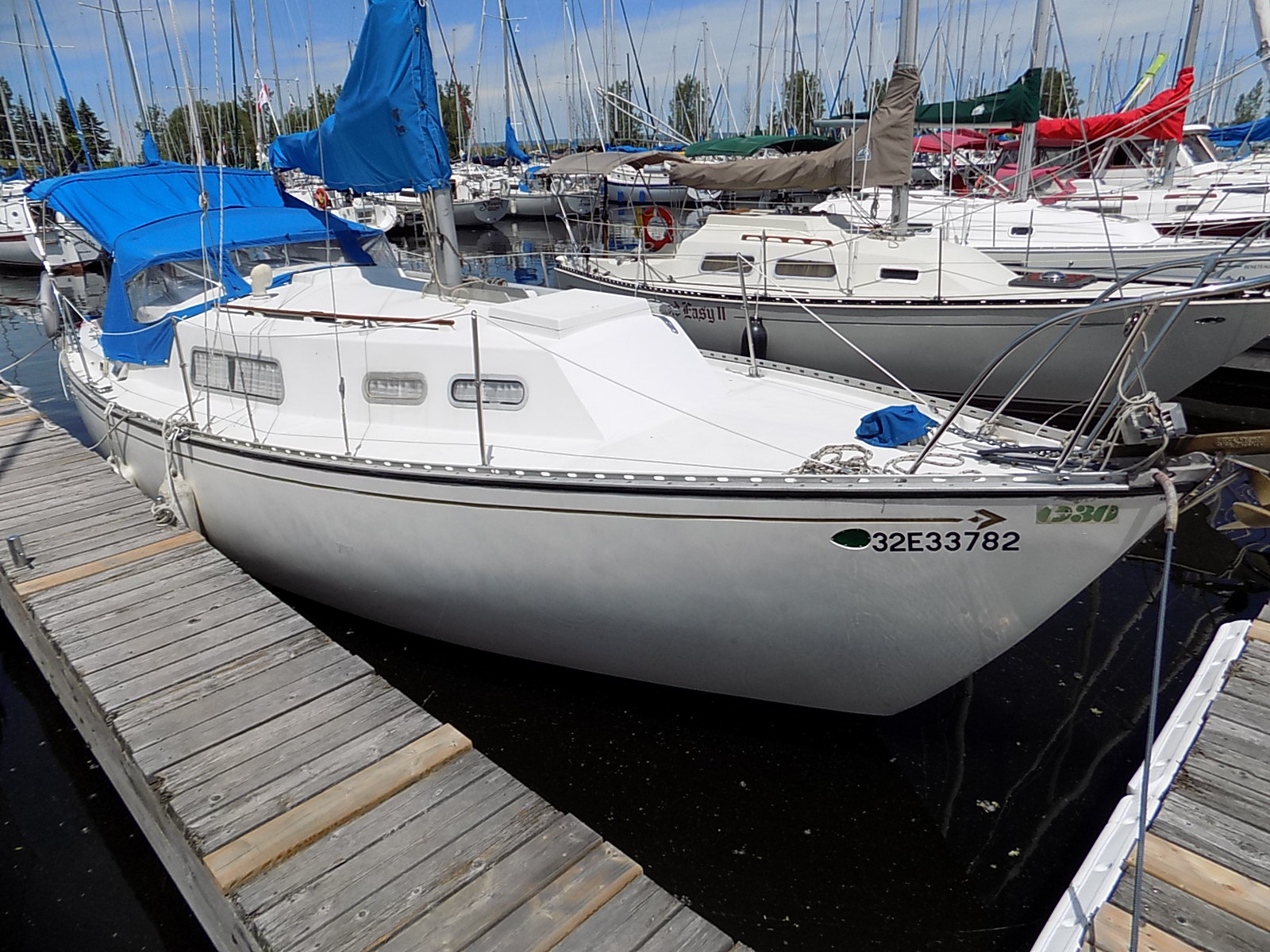
Grampian 30

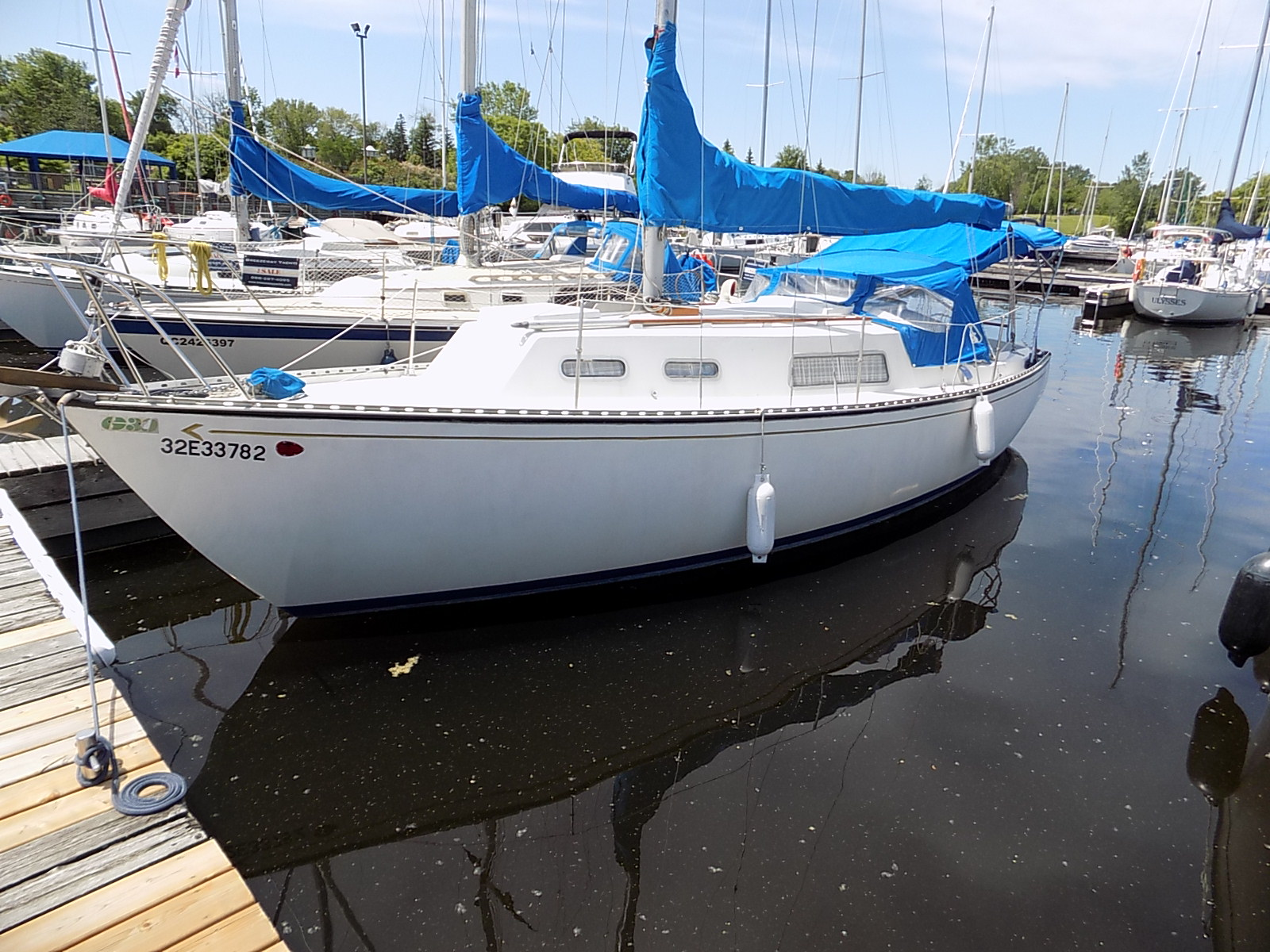
Grampian 30

The Grampian 30 is a small recreational keelboat, built predominantly of fiberglass, with wood trim. It has a masthead sloop rig, a raked stem, a reverse transom and an internally-mounted spade-type rudder controlled by a wheel. It may be fitted with a fixed fin keel or, optionally a centreboard and stub keel. It displaces 8,600 lb (3,901 kg) and carries 3,870 lb (1,755 kg) of ballast.

The boat has a draft of 4.67 ft (1.42 m) with the standard keel fitted. The centreboard version has a draft of 7.00 ft (2.13 m) with the centreboard extended and 3.00 ft (0.91 m) with it retracted, allowing ground transportation on a trailer.

A tall mast version was also produced that has a mast about 4.5 ft (1.4 m) higher.

The boat is fitted with a Universal Atomic 4 gasoline engine. The fuel tank holds 10 U.S. gallons (38 L; 8.3 imp gal) and the fresh water tank has a capacity of 15 U.S. gallons (57 L; 12 imp gal).

The centreboard version has a PHRF racing average handicap of 201 with a high of 180 and low of 216. The tall mast model has a PHRF racing average handicap of 195 with a high of 186 and low of 207. All models have hull speeds of 6.77 kn (12.54 km/h).

== Operational history ==
A Grampian 30 was run aground off Cape Hatteras in a severe storm. The crew remained on board while the boat was laid on its side for four hours as they had no escape in the storm. After the storm had abated and the tide went out, the boat was left high and dry. When the tide came back in the boat was floated off the shore. Back in port the only damage found was bent keel bolts.

In a review Michael McGoldrick wrote, "Regardless of their size category, the various Grampian models have one thing in common - they offer a lot of boat for relatively little money... Some people find that it isn't the sleekest looking sailboat, and that its appearance may be a little dated, but the Grampian 30 is very much a modern 30 foot production fiberglass sailboat of the 1970s. While it has been suggested that this model doesn't quite live up to the Grampian 26's reputation as a good sailing boat, it does have a nice interior layout with loads of room."

== See also ==
- List of sailing boat types
