= Grampian 23 =

1970s Canadian recreational keelboat

Development
- Designer: Alex McGruer
- Location: Canada
- Year: 1971
- No. built: 450
- Builder: Grampian Marine
- Role: Cruiser

Boat
- Displacement: 3,200 lb (1,451 kg)
- Draft: 5.33 ft (1.62 m) with keel down

Hull
- Type: monohull
- Construction: fibreglass
- LOA: 23.25 ft (7.09 m)
- LWL: 20.93 ft (6.38 m)
- Beam: 8.00 ft (2.44 m)
- Engine: outboard motor

Hull appendages
- Keel: swing keel
- Ballast: 1,033 lb (469 kg)
- Rudder: transom-mounted rudder

Rig
- Rig type: Bermuda rig
- I foretriangle height: 26.40 ft (8.05 m)
- J foretriangle base: 9.90 ft (3.02 m)
- P mainsail luff: 23.70 ft (7.22 m)
- E mainsail foot: 9.30 ft (2.83 m)

Sails
- Sailplan: masthead sloop
- Mainsail area: 110.21 sq ft (10.239 m^{2})
- Jib/genoa area: 130.68 sq ft (12.141 m^{2})
- Total sail area: 240.89 sq ft (22.379 m^{2})

Racing
- PHRF: 270

The Grampian 23 is a recreational keelboat built by Grampian Marine in Canada between 1971 and 1976 with 450 boats completed.

The fibreglass hull has a transom-hung rudder controlled by a tiller. With a swing keel it has a draft of 5.33 ft (1.62 m) with the swing keel extended and 2.36 ft (0.72 m) with it retracted. A fixed fin keel was optional.

It has five berths, with a double "V"-berth, a dinette table in the main cabin that converts to a double berth and an aft berth on the port side, under the cockpit. The galley is on the port side amidships, and is equipped with a two-burner stove and a sink. The head is just aft of the bow cabin on the starboard side. Cabin headroom is 64 in (160 cm). The cabin has a poptop. The spacious interior makes the cockpit is relatively small for the boat's size.

It has a masthead sloop rig. For sailing downwind the design may be equipped with a symmetrical spinnaker.

It has a hull speed of 6.1 kn (11.3 km/h).
