= Dawson 26 =

Sailboat class

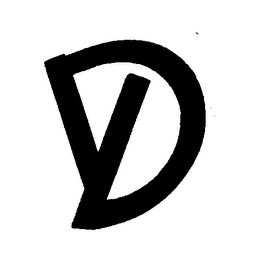
- Class symbol

Development
- Designer: Robert Finch
- Location: United States
- Year: 1973
- No. built: 300
- Builder: Dawson Yacht Corporation
- Role: Cruiser
- Name: Dawson 26

Boat
- Displacement: 4,700 lb (2,132 kg)
- Draft: 5.33 ft (1.62 m), centerboard down

Hull
- Type: Monohull
- Construction: Fiberglass
- LOA: 25.58 ft (7.80 m)
- LWL: 22.17 ft (6.76 m)
- Beam: 8.00 ft (2.44 m)
- Engine: Universal Atomic 4 gasoline engine

Hull appendages
- Keel: stub keel and centerboard
- Ballast: 1,165 lb (528 kg)
- Rudder: transom-mounted rudder

Rig
- Rig type: Bermuda rig
- I foretriangle height: 29.25 ft (8.92 m)
- J foretriangle base: 10.00 ft (3.05 m)
- P mainsail luff: 24.00 ft (7.32 m)
- E mainsail foot: 10.33 ft (3.15 m)

Sails
- Sailplan: Masthead sloop
- Mainsail area: 146.25 sq ft (13.587 m^{2})
- Jib/genoa area: 123.96 sq ft (11.516 m^{2})
- Total sail area: 270.21 sq ft (25.103 m^{2})

The Dawson 26 is an American trailerable sailboat that was designed by Robert Finch as a cruiser and first built in 1973.

Originally known as the Midship 26, the Dawson 26 design was later developed into the Parker Dawson 26, a boat with a lighter displacement and ballast.

== Production ==
The design was built by the Dawson Yacht Corporation in the United States, with 300 examples completed between 1973 and 1982, but it is now out of production.

A brochure, created in 1976, described it as, "a center cockpit, trailerable, auxiliary yacht, engineered and built without compromise for extended ocean going capability. Two separate cabins, five full size berths, sloop or ketch rigged." The "D" for Dawson became a trademark on 8 February 1977 and was used in company advertisements. It was cancelled on 5 July 1983.

== Design ==
The Dawson 26 is a recreational keelboat, built predominantly of fiberglass, with wood trim. It has a masthead sloop rig or optional ketch rig, with a mizzenmast. It features a raked stem, a plumb transom, a transom-hung rudder controlled by a wheel and a retractable centerboard. It displaces 4,700 lb (2,132 kg) and carries 1,165 lb (528 kg) of ballast.

The design has an unusual configuration for a boat of this size, with a center cockpit and an aft cabin.

The boat has a draft of 5.33 ft (1.62 m) with the centreboard extended and 1.67 ft (0.51 m) with it retracted, allowing beaching or road transportation on a trailer.

The boat is optionally fitted with a Universal Atomic 4 gasoline engine for docking and maneuvering. The fuel tank holds 18 U.S. gallons (68 L; 15 imp gal).

== Operational history ==
In the Story of the Windship 'Prodigal', Bob Lengyel wrote about a journey across the Atlantic Ocean on the Dawson 26 Prodigal. Lengyel sailed in June 1975, from Virginia Beach, Virginia, stopped at the Azores, arriving in Plymouth, England, on September 16, 1975, having sailed 4,400 nmi (8,149 km) in 42 days at sea. This was a "warm up" for the 1976 OSTAR, which Lengyel completed in his Dawson 26, during the summer of 1976.
