= Robert Finch (yacht designer) =

American yacht designer (1930-2016)

- Born: April 14, 1930; Houston, Texas, United States
- Died: August 9, 2016 (aged 86); Chicago, Illinois, United States
- Occupation: yacht designer

Robert Finch (April 14, 1930- August 9, 2016) was an American yacht designer who created 18 sailboat designs during the 1970s including the Catalina 27 (with Frank Butler), the Dawson 26 and the Parker Dawson 26.

== Early life ==
On April 4, 1930, Robert Joseph Finch was born in Houston, Texas to Margaret and Robert Arnold Finch; he grew up in Los Angeles, California. In 1947, he convinced sailors on a Dagmar Salen M/S (a Merchant Marine ship) that was traveling to China to become a deckhand for the summer. In 1950, he married Carol whom he met in high school and went on to have five children in Torrance, California.

== Career ==
During the 1950s, Finch constructed his first boat from plans in Popular Mechanics which ultimately started a fervor for designing, building and racing his own sailboats. He designed 14 production boats with some boats being for Catalina Yachts and Islander Yachts, as well as his own custom boats in which some he built himself. In 1971, he made the design for the Catalina 27 with Frank Butler. Unlike other boats, production of the boat started without any tweaks to the original design. A total of 6662 Catalina 27 boats were produced.

During the 1970s, National Geographic launched Bob Finch Books for Finch and became a popular dealer of the magazines. He had gained an interest in polar exploration, leading him to rename his company to "High Latitude," and became a noted expert on rare Arctic and Antarctic books and artifacts. He was described by Cardiologist William D. Priester in a tribute dinner saying that Finch had done more than anyone in his polar collecting field.

In 1980, he retired from Culver City Fire Department as captain.

== Death ==
On August 9, 2016, Finch died of a brain hemorrhage in Swedish Hospital at the age of 86. A private memorial service was held, with donations being accepted to the Bainbridge Island Fire Department.

== Personal life ==
In total, Finch had five children, six grandchildren and five great-grandchildren. He and his wife built three houses while on Bainbridge Island, Washington.
