= Nash 26 =

Sailboat class

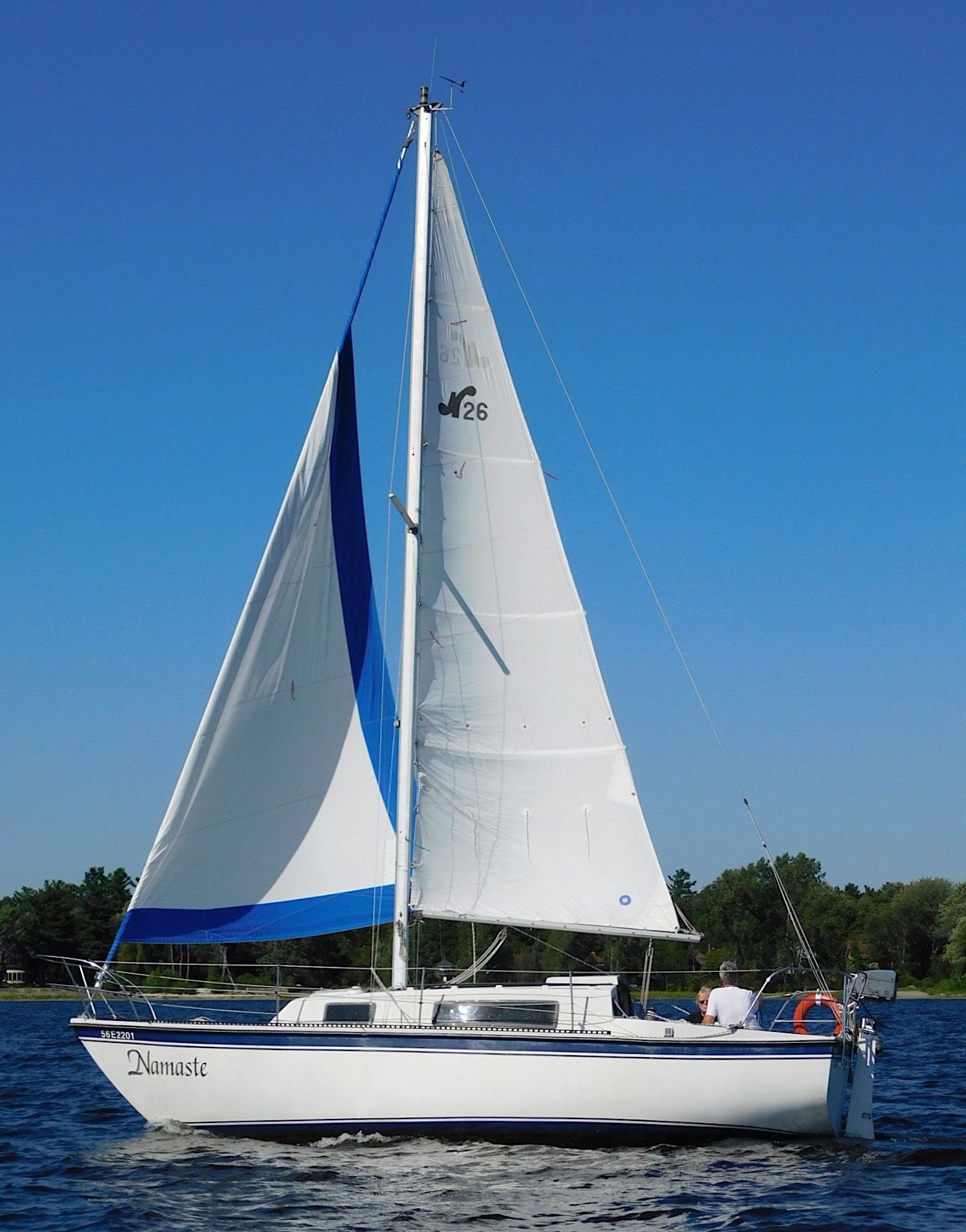

Development
- Designer: Joe Nash
- Location: Canada
- Year: 1975
- Builder: J. J. Nash Industries
- Name: Nash 26

Boat
- Displacement: 5,200 lb (2,359 kg)
- Draft: 3.83 ft (1.17 m)

Hull
- Type: Monohull
- Construction: Fiberglass
- LOA: 26.00 ft (7.92 m)
- LWL: 21.25 ft (6.48 m)
- Beam: 8.50 ft (2.59 m)

Hull appendages
- Keel: fin keel
- Ballast: 2,100 lb (953 kg)
- Rudder: transom-mounted rudder

Rig
- General: Masthead sloop
- I foretriangle height: 31.25 ft (9.53 m)
- J foretriangle base: 20.40 ft (6.22 m)
- P mainsail luff: 29.50 ft (8.99 m)
- E mainsail foot: 8.50 ft (2.59 m)

Sails
- Mainsail area: 125.38 sq ft (11.648 m^{2})
- Jib/genoa area: 162.50 sq ft (15.097 m^{2})
- Total sail area: 287.88 sq ft (26.745 m^{2})

Racing
- PHRF: 231 (average)

The Nash 26 is a Canadian sailboat designed by Joe Nash and first built in 1975.

== Production ==
The boat was built by J. J. Nash Industries in Strathroy, Ontario, Canada, but it is now out of production.

== Design ==
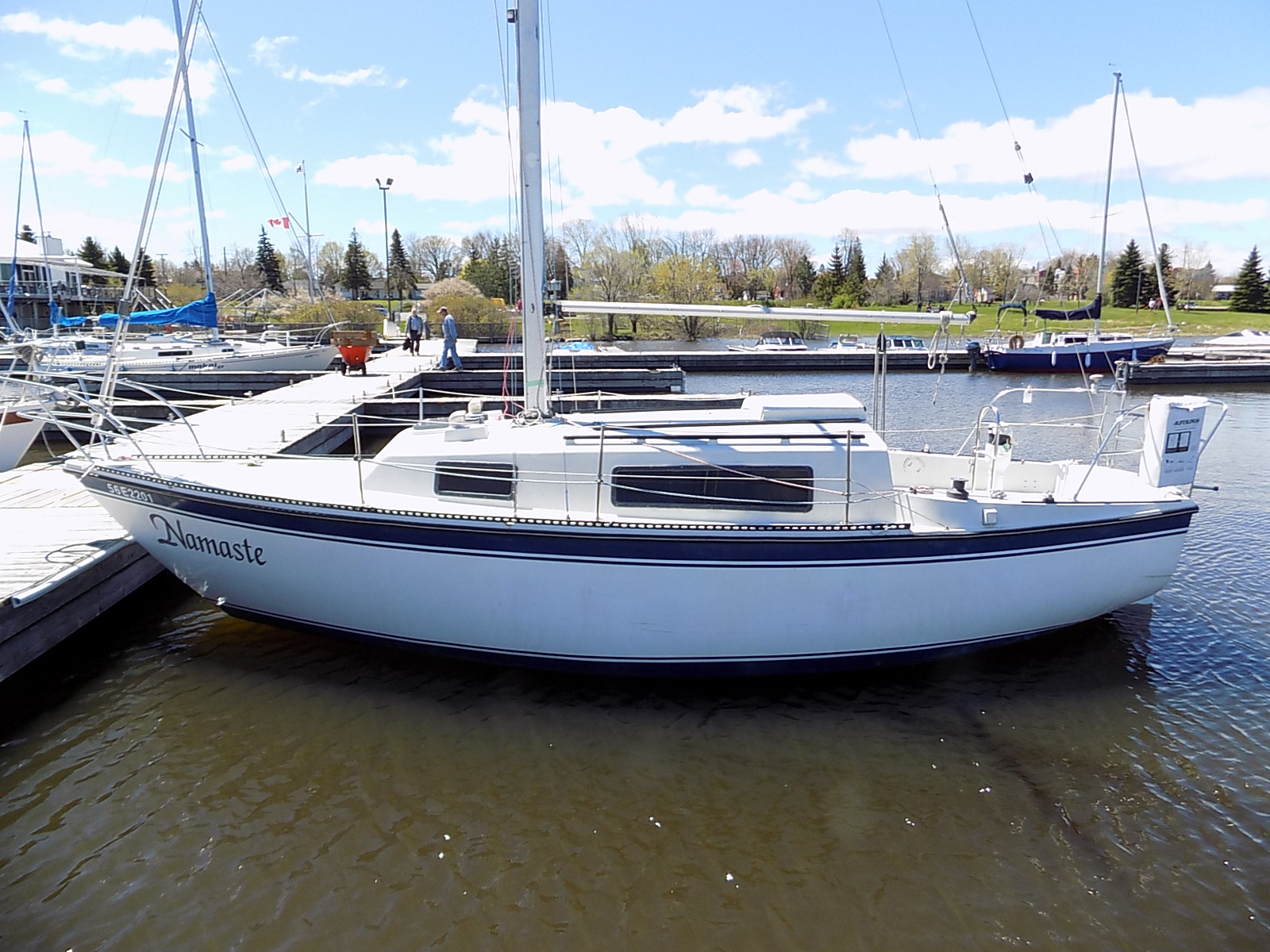
Nash 26

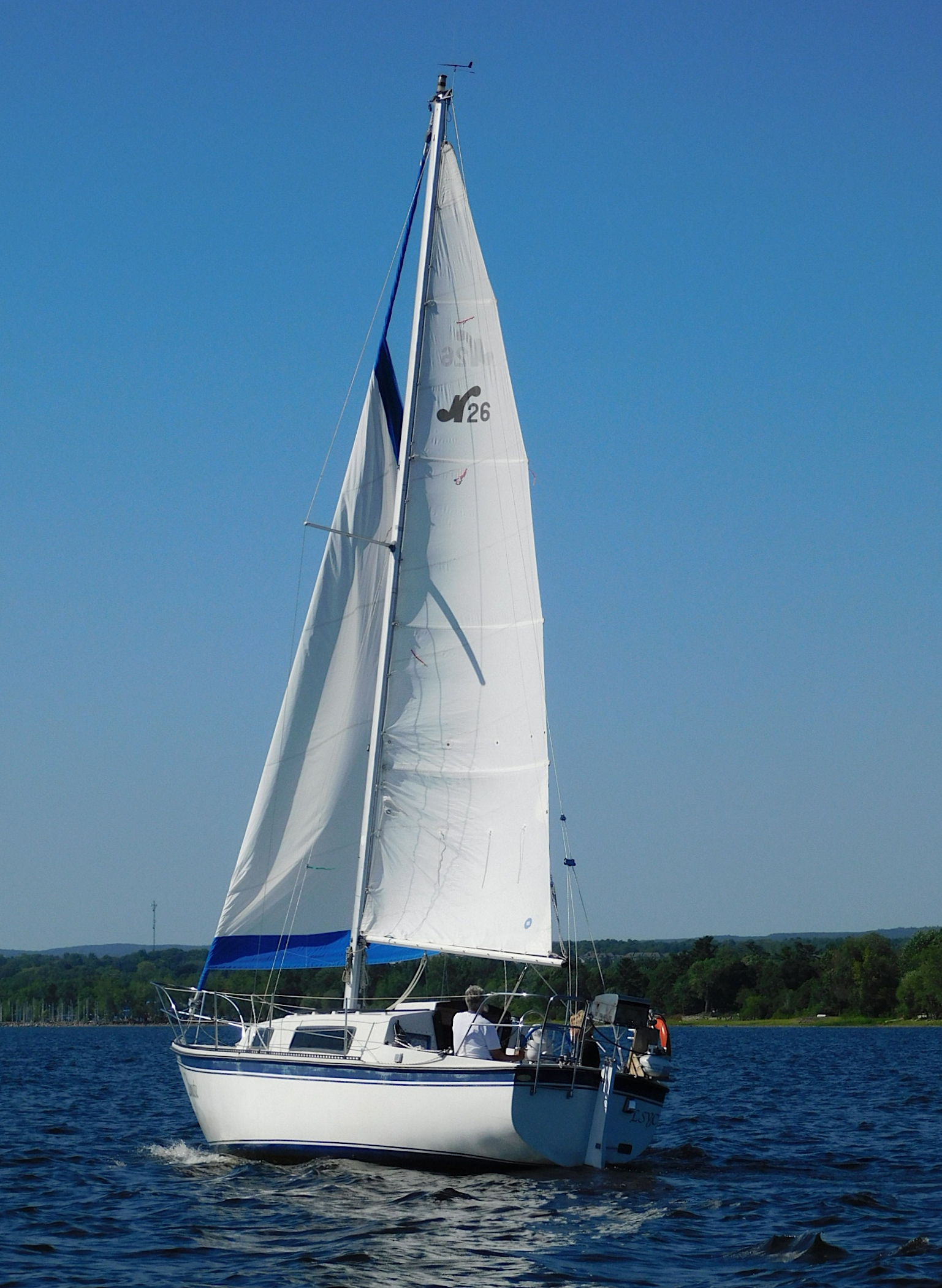
Nash 26 showing transom

The Nash 26 is a small recreational keelboat, built predominantly of fiberglass, with wood trim. It has a masthead sloop rig, a transom-hung rudder and a fixed fin keel. It displaces 5,200 lb (2,359 kg) and carries 2,100 lb (953 kg) of ballast.

The boat has a draft of 3.83 ft (1.17 m) with the standard keel fitted.

The boat has a PHRF racing average handicap of 231 and a hull speed of 6.18 kn (11.45 km/h).

== Operational history ==
In a review Michael McGoldrick wrote, "The Nash 26 ... is a relatively large 26 footer with a nice interior layout which includes the maximum in the way of cruising amenities for a boat in this size range. Despite the priority placed on interior space, it still has acceptable proportions for a cruising boat, although some later Nash 26s appear to have been built with a slightly boxy-looking cabin."

== See also ==
- List of sailing boat types
