= Parker Dawson 26 =

1970s US recreational keelboat

Development
- Designer: Robert Finch
- Location: United States
- Year: 1972
- No. built: about 300
- Builder: Parker Dawson Yachts
- Name: Parker Dawson 26

Boat
- Displacement: 4,000 lb (1,814 kg)
- Draft: 5.33 ft (1.62 m), keel down

Hull
- Type: Monohull
- Construction: Fiberglass
- LOA: 25.70 ft (7.83 m)
- LWL: 22.17 ft (6.76 m)
- Beam: 8.00 ft (2.44 m)
- Engine: Inboard Yanmar 7.5 hp (6 kW) diesel engine or outboard motor

Hull appendages
- Keel: lifting keel
- Ballast: 1,100 lb (499 kg)
- Rudder: lifting transom-mounted rudder

Rig
- Rig type: Bermuda rig
- I foretriangle height: 29.25 ft (8.92 m)
- J foretriangle base: 10.00 ft (3.05 m)
- P mainsail luff: 24.00 ft (7.32 m)
- E mainsail foot: 10.33 ft (3.15 m)

Sails
- Sailplan: Masthead sloop
- Mainsail area: 123.96 sq ft (11.516 m^{2})
- Jib/genoa area: 146.25 sq ft (13.587 m^{2})
- Total sail area: 270.21 sq ft (25.103 m^{2})

The Parker Dawson 26 is a recreational keelboat that has been sold by a number of different manufacturers under several names, including the Midship 25, Dawson 25, Nauset 26 and Bombay 26. It is a development of the Dawson 26.

== Production ==
The design was built by Midship Yacht Company and Parker Dawson Yachts, as well as other builders in the United States. About 200 were built by Midship between 1972 and 1974, then Parker Dawson built it from 1973 to 1982. Approximately 300 were completed by all manufacturers by the mid-1980s, but it is now out of production.

Midship Yachts was located in California, but later moved to Las Vegas, Nevada. Parker Dawson Yachts was located in Massachusetts.

It has been sailed across the Atlantic Ocean single-handedly.

== Design ==
The Parker Dawson 26 is a recreational keelboat, built predominantly of fiberglass, with wood trim. It has a masthead sloop rig, although some were built as ketches, a raked stem, a vertical transom, a lifting transom-hung rudder controlled by a wheel or geared tiller and a lifting or fixed fin keel. It displaces 4,000 lb (1,814 kg) and carries 1,100 lb (499 kg) of ballast.

The lifting keel version has a 50:1 worm gear to raise the keel. The rudder raises and lowers in an aluminum mounting frame.

The fixed keel-equipped version of the boat has a draft of 5.00 ft (1.52 m), while the lifting keel-equipped version has a draft of 5.18 ft (1.58 m) with the keel extended and 1.16 ft (0.35 m) with it retracted, allowing beaching or ground transportation on a trailer.

The boat is fitted either with a Yanmar inboard diesel engine of 7.5 hp (6 kW), other small inboard engines or a small outboard motor for docking and maneuvering. The fuel tank holds 15 U.S. gallons (57 L; 12 imp gal) and the fresh water tank has a capacity of 25 U.S. gallons (95 L; 21 imp gal).

The design has an unusual configuration for a boat of its size, with a cabin forward and one aft, with a center cockpit. The aft cabin has two bunks and a sink, with space for a portable or marine head. The forward cabin is located with the main cabin, as there are no internal bulkheads in the hull. The head is located under the starboard settee which can be used as a berth. There is a removable dinette table. The galley in the main cabin is to port. There are four fixed portlights in the forward cabin, while the aft cabin has two fixed ports and one that opens.

The boat has a hinged mast, mounted on the forward cabin roof. There are two jib sheet winches and one for the halyards and an anchor locker forward.

The design has a hull speed of 6.31 kn (11.69 km/h).

== Reception ==
In a 2010 review Steve Henkel wrote, "this pocket cruiser is unique in several respects: (1) she has two separate cabins plus a center cockpit, which can be enclosed in canvas to serve as a third cabin; (2) a fixed-keel version with beefed-up rigging has crossed the Atlantic and a good part of the Pacific, indicating at least a smidgen of seaworthiness; and (3) she is trailerable and ramp-launchable despite her relatively heavy displacement for her size—provided your truck or SUV can handle 8,000 pound loads. A variety of options were available from various marketers (Midship Yachts, Dawson, Parker-Dawson, Nauset Marine, others) who offered at various times inboard diesel, inboard gas, and outboard power; fixed shoal keel or swing keel; wheel or tiller steering; and sloop rig or ketch. Best features: The privacy that comes with two cabins and two heads is a great plus, especially if guests are aboard. Worst features: Speed is said to be so-so in light and medium air. Owners have complained about a lack of helm feel and drag on early models; later boats were given push-pull cable steering gear rather than the pull-pull variety, which evidently solved the problem. Rudder scabbards, originally of aluminum, were switched to fiberglass to eliminate rudder banging at moorings. And the swing keel can bang around in its trunk unless pinned in place, which owners sometimes forget to do."
