= Grampian Marine =

Sailboat manufacturer

Grampian Marine Limited
- Company type: Privately held company
- Industry: Boat building
- Founded: 1962
- Founder: Jim Bisiker
- Defunct: 1977
- Headquarters: Oakville, Ontario, Canada
- Products: Sailboats

Grampian Marine Limited was a Canadian boat builder based in Oakville, Ontario. The company specialized in the design and manufacture of fiberglass sailboats.

The company was founded by Jim Bisiker in 1962 and operated until 1977.

== History ==
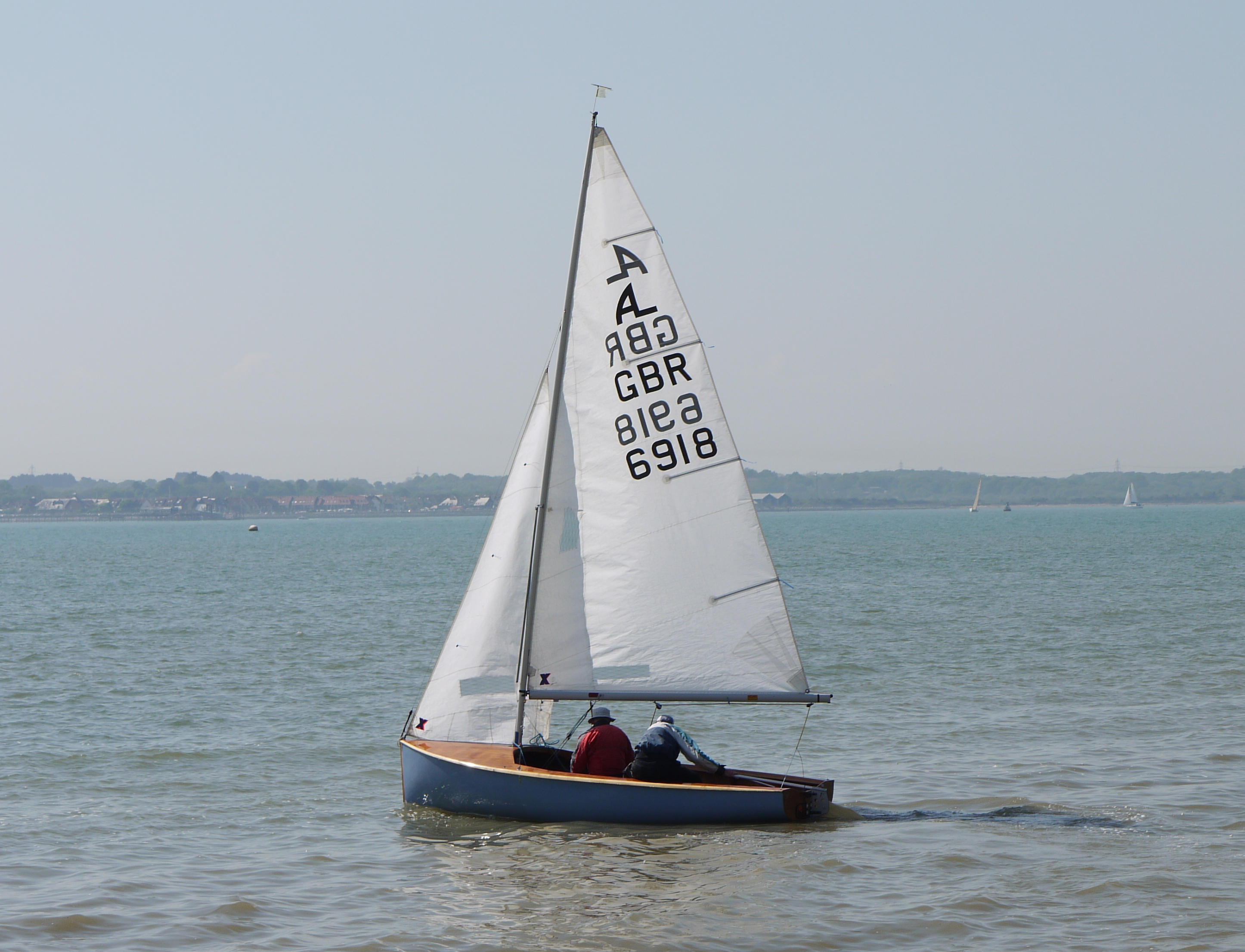
Albacore dinghy

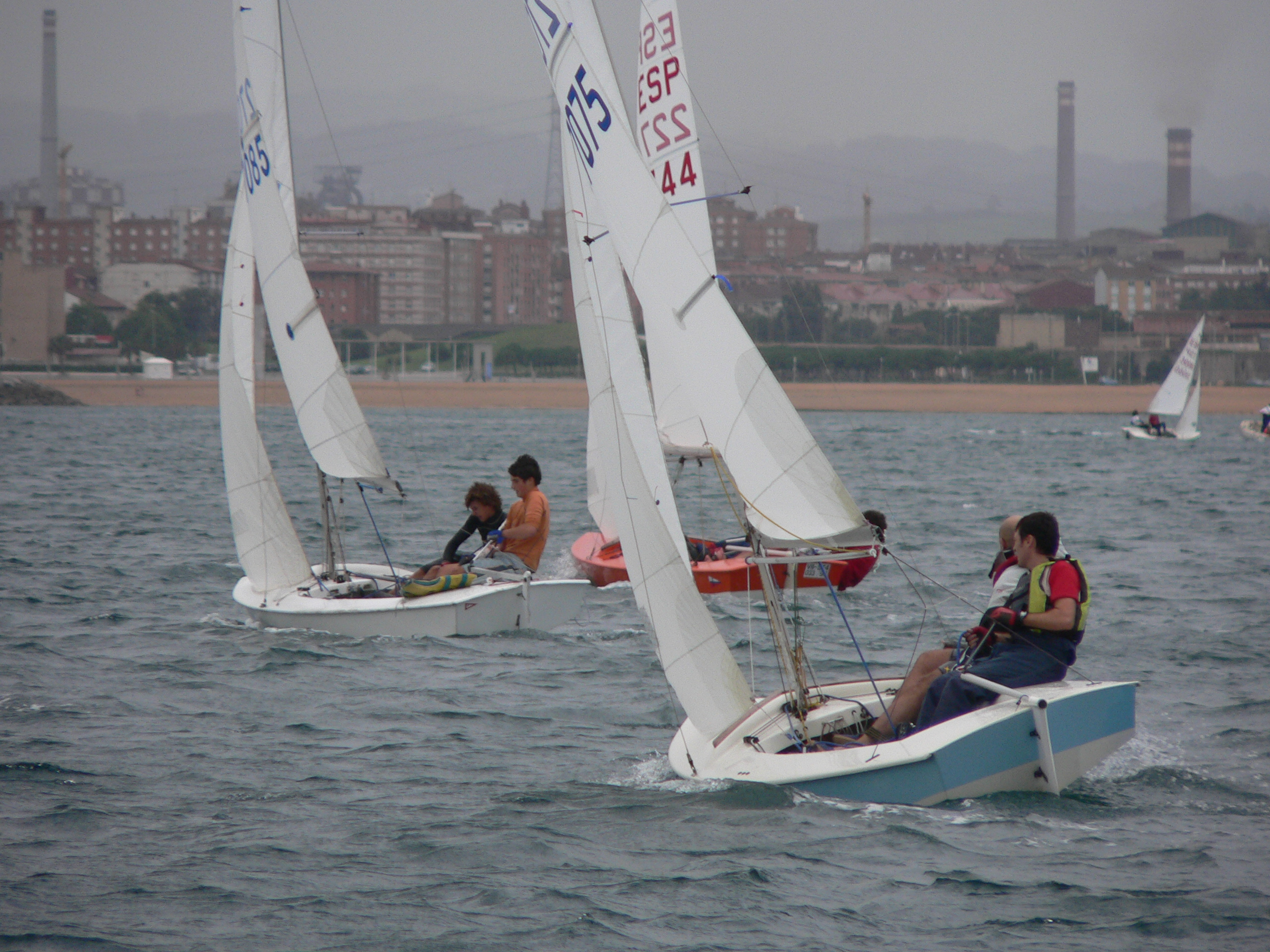
Snipe dinghy

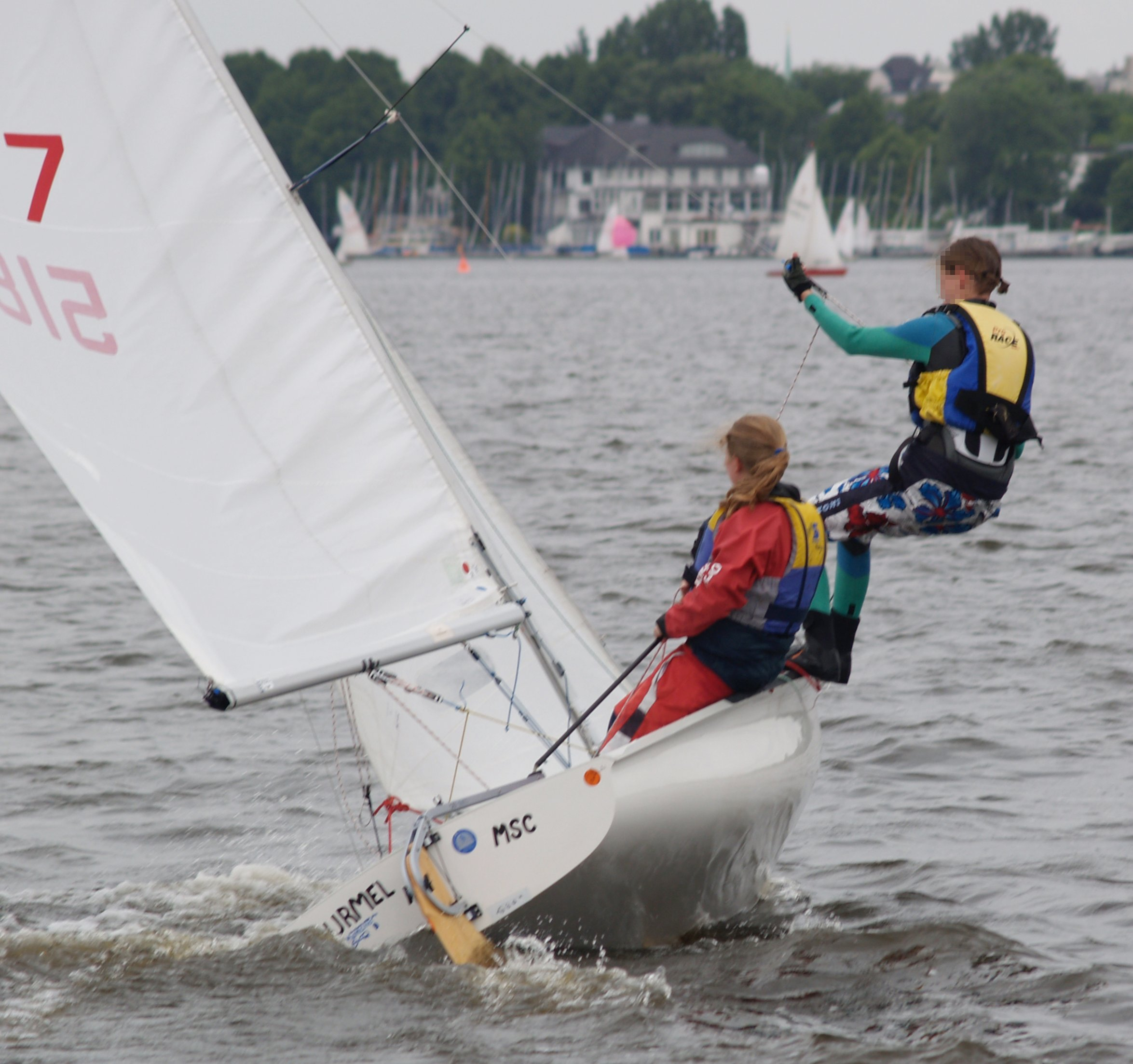
420 dinghy

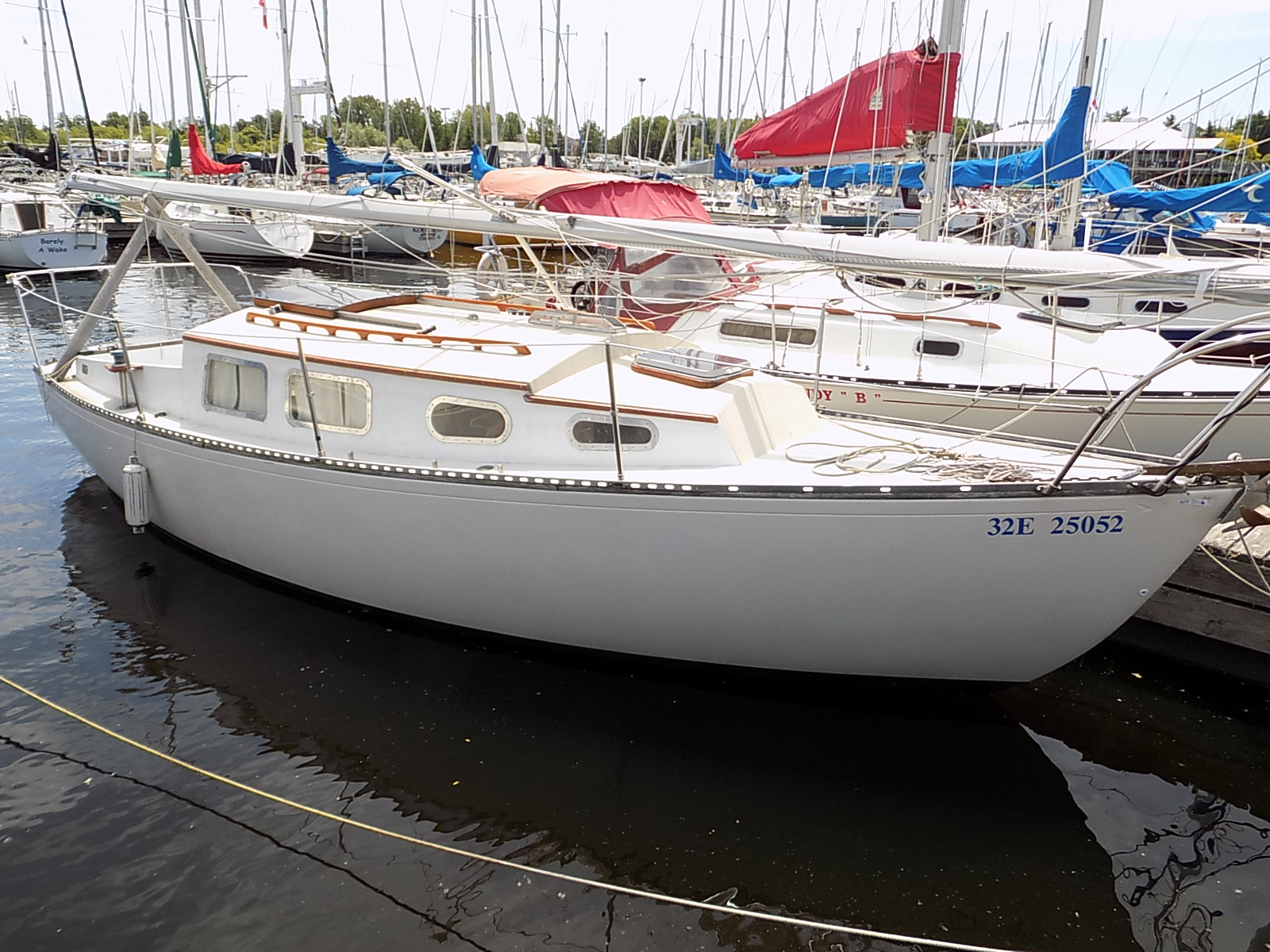
Grampian 26

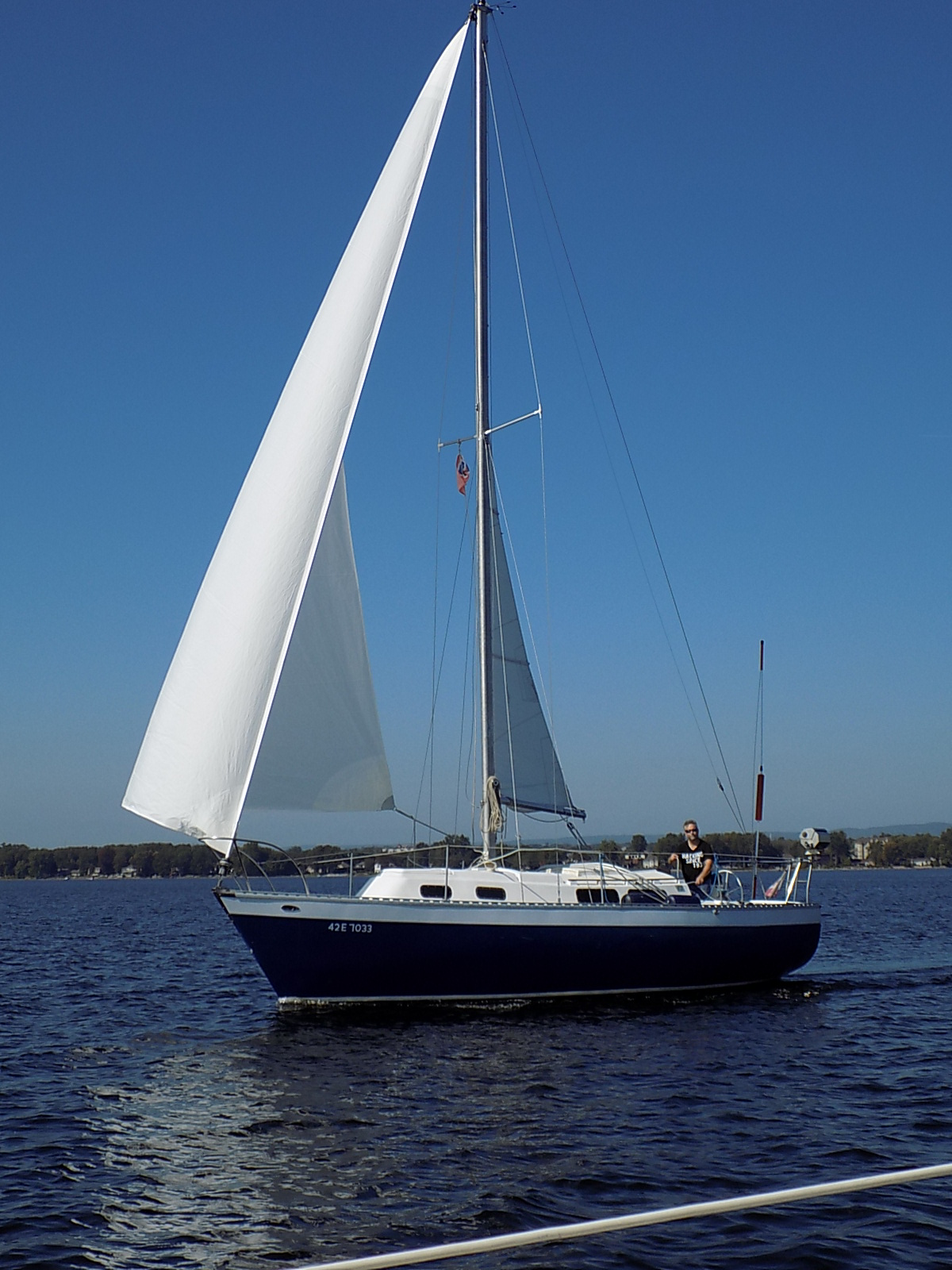
Grampian 28

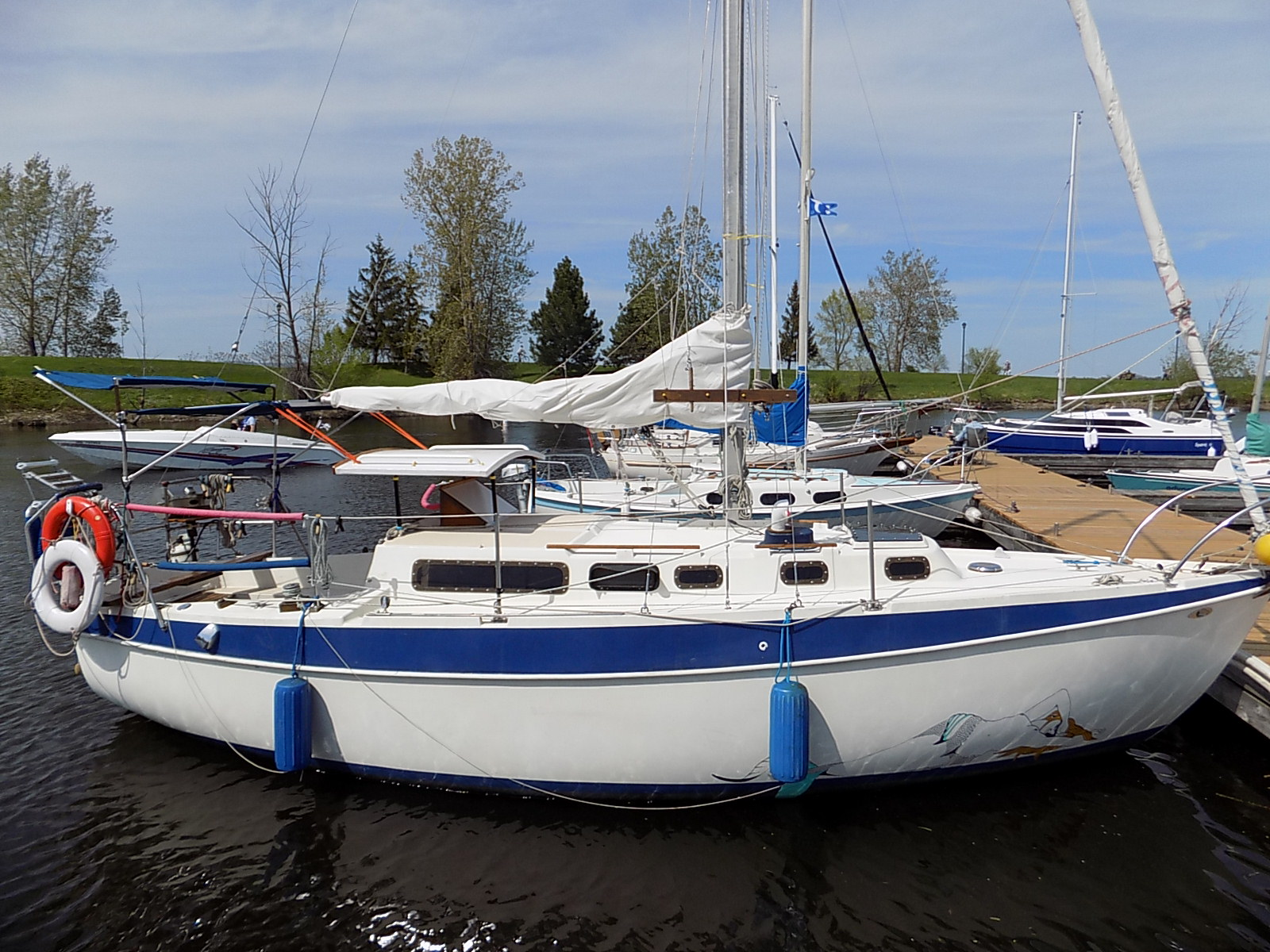
Discovery 7.9

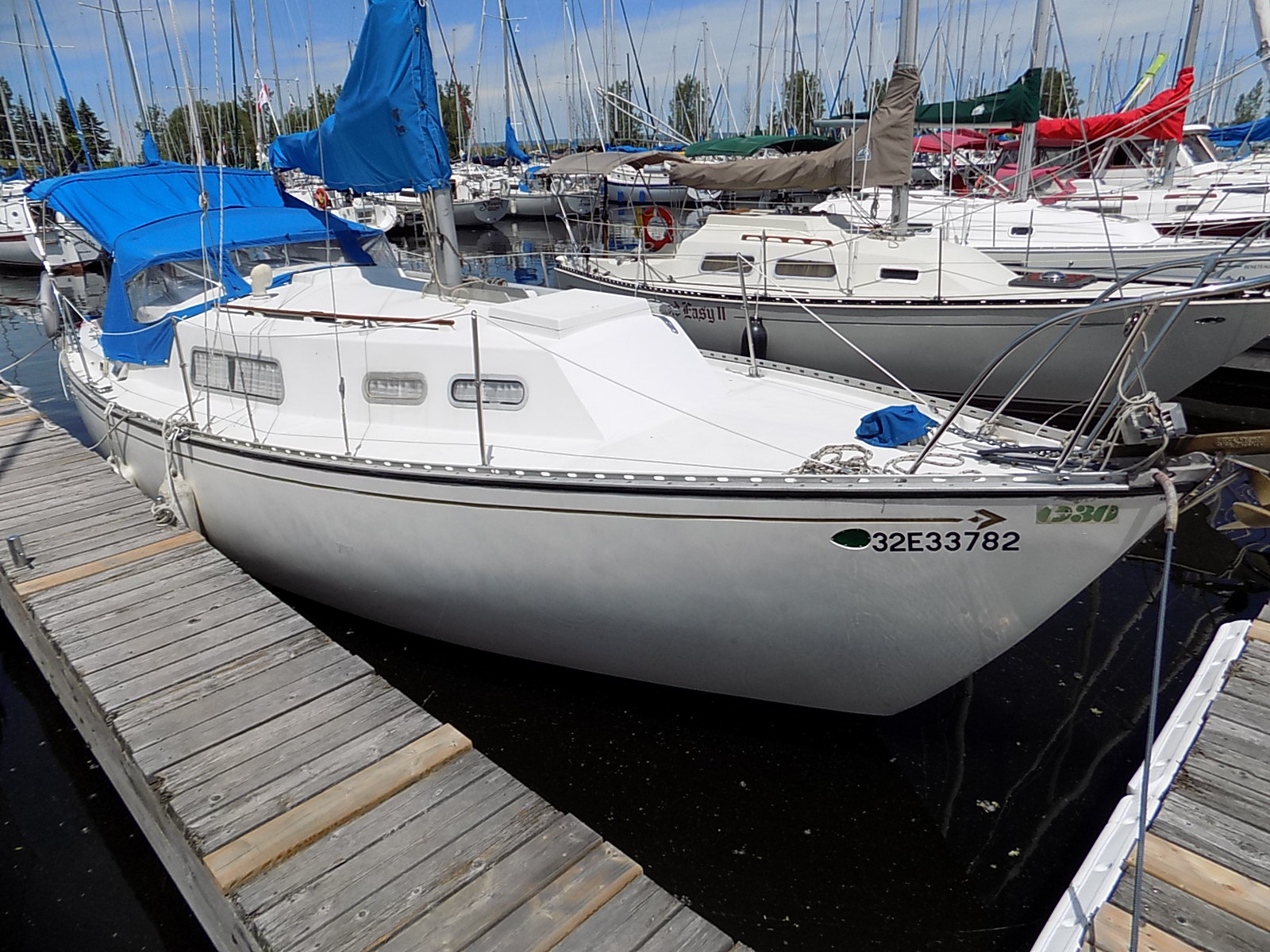
Grampian 30

The company was formed by Bisiker as a result of a downturn in his building construction business in the early 1960s in Oakville, Ontario. To learn the then-new art of fibreglass boat building Bisiker and colleagues Dick Kneulman and John Burn attended training at Dyer Yachts in Rhode Island, United States, a leader in fibreglass construction. The Grampian plant was established on land owned by Bisiker's construction company on Woody Road in Oakville and named for the Grampian Mountains of Scotland, where Jim Bisiker’s grandmother lived near Aberdeen.

The new company attracted boat builders wanting the manufacturer to build boats for them under contract. Charles Angle, of Rochester, New York approached Grampian to build his Triangle 20 and Triangle 32 designs and later on the US Yachts US 42 and its development version, the US Yachts US 46. Those designs were marketed by US Yachts, led by Bob Larsen and Warren Dellenbaugh, who were involved with O'Day Corp., founded by George O'Day and the O’Day company president, Lyman Bullard. As a result of this relationship Grampian began building US Yachts designs and also O'Day designs for the Canadian market. Grampian also worked on the development of the Hunt-designed O'Day ocean-going power boats, but did not actually produce the designs.

In the late 1960s the company refused an offer to be purchased by O'Day Yachts, although O'Day did buy US Yachts and Triangle Yachts before they went public with an initial public offering on the New York Stock Exchange.

Grampain's early offerings included a number of popular small dinghies of the period, including the 420, Snipe, Jumpahead, Albacore and Flying Tern. The Albacores were produced under licence from Fairey Marine. Early boat customers included the Government of Canada, which ordered 50 of the 420s.

The company expanded into small keelboats and built the Classic 22 and the Grampian 17. At the suggestion of George Walton Yachts of Annapolis, Maryland the company established its own line of yachts, starting with the Grampian Classic 31 and the Grampian Classic 37. As a result of the market success of these models the company hired its own designer, Scotsman Alex McGruer. He designed the Grampian 26, which sold 980 copies, making it one of the most successful Canadian designs in its size range. McGruer went on to design the Grampian 30 and Grampian 23. The Grampian 23 was not as successful, selling only a few hundred examples.

As the company expanded it opened a branch plant in North Carolina.

The company was approached by George Cuthbertson of C&C Yachts with a proposal for a merger, as C&C produced mostly racing boats, while Grampian was building boats for the cruising segment of the market. The deal was not pursued.

While he was the majority shareholder Bisiker did not run the company on a day-to-day basis, leaving that to paid staff. When the company was founded the Canadian dollar traded at about 70 cents US and that made Grampian's boats attractive in the US market. By the mid-1970s the Canadian dollar had climbed to over US$1 and exports were less competitive. Many other companies had also entered the boat-building market and provided a lot of competition, resulting in diminished sales.

The company was placed in receivership and closed in 1977. Its boat designs, tooling, molds and other assets were sold to a number of different companies. The North Carolina plant was sold to Tanzer Industries.

== Boats ==
Summary of boats built by Grampian Marine:

- 420
- Snipe
- Jumpahead
- Albacore
- Flying Tern
- International Flying Junior
- Triangle 32
- Triangle 20
- Classic 22
- Classic 31
- Eagle 27
- US Yachts US 41
- Walton 37
- Classic 37
- Grampian Classic 31
- Grampian Classic 37
- Grampian 26
- US Yachts US 46
- Grampian 30
- Grampian 22
- Grampian 17
- Grampian 46
- Grampian Classic 22
- Grampian 23
- Grampian 34
- Grampian 2-34
- Discovery 7.9
- Grampian 28

== See also ==
- List of sailboat designers and manufacturers
