= Grampian 26 =

Canadian keelboat built 1967–1977

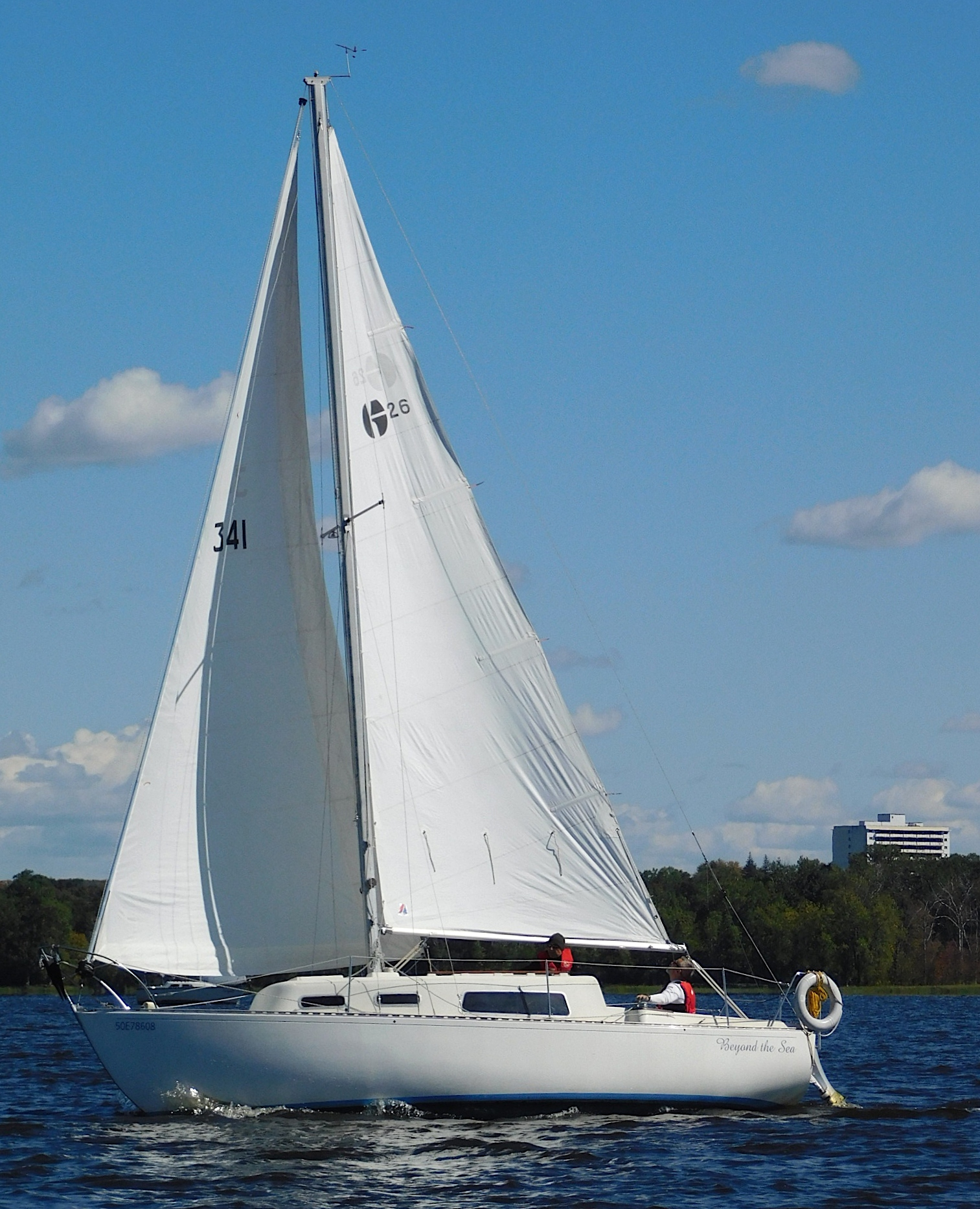

Development
- Designer: Alex McGruer
- Location: Canada
- Year: 1967
- No. built: 980
- Builder: Grampian Marine
- Name: Grampian 26

Boat
- Displacement: 5,600 lb (2,540 kg)
- Draft: 3.00 ft (0.91 m)

Hull
- Type: Monohull
- Construction: Fiberglass
- LOA: 26.00 ft (7.92 m)
- LWL: 21.75 ft (6.63 m)
- Beam: 8.33 ft (2.54 m)
- Engine: Palmer gasoline engine

Hull appendages
- Keel: fin keel
- Ballast: 2,600 lb (1,179 kg)
- Rudder: internally-mounted spade-type rudder

Rig
- Rig type: Bermuda rig
- I foretriangle height: 33.00 ft (10.06 m)
- J foretriangle base: 10.25 ft (3.12 m)
- P mainsail luff: 28.00 ft (8.53 m)
- E mainsail foot: 11.17 ft (3.40 m)

Sails
- Sailplan: Masthead sloop
- Mainsail area: 156.38 sq ft (14.528 m^{2})
- Jib/genoa area: 169.13 sq ft (15.713 m^{2})
- Total sail area: 325.51 sq ft (30.241 m^{2})

Racing
- PHRF: 228 (average)

The Grampian 26 is a recreational keelboat built by Grampian Marine in Oakville, Ontario between 1967 and 1977. It is one of the most successful Canadian designs of its size with 960 completed.

Designed by Alex McGruer, it has a raked stem, a vertical transom, an internally-mounted spade-type rudder and a fixed fin keel or centreboard.

A few centreboard models were built in 1967.

The Grampian 26 design was developed into the Discovery 7.9 in 1975 and which was built in small numbers.

The fresh water tank has a capacity of 20 U.S. gallons (76 L; 17 imp gal).

== Use as a cruiser ==
The cabin is spacious. In the 1970s a Grampian 26 was sailed down the St Lawrence River, to the Atlantic Ocean, down the east coast of North America, through the Panama Canal and north to Seattle on the US west coast.

Owners Dick and Theda Morris sailed their Grampian 26 from New York to Europe and cruised it there for two years. They then returned across the Atlantic to Key West, Florida via the Caribbean.

== Gallery ==
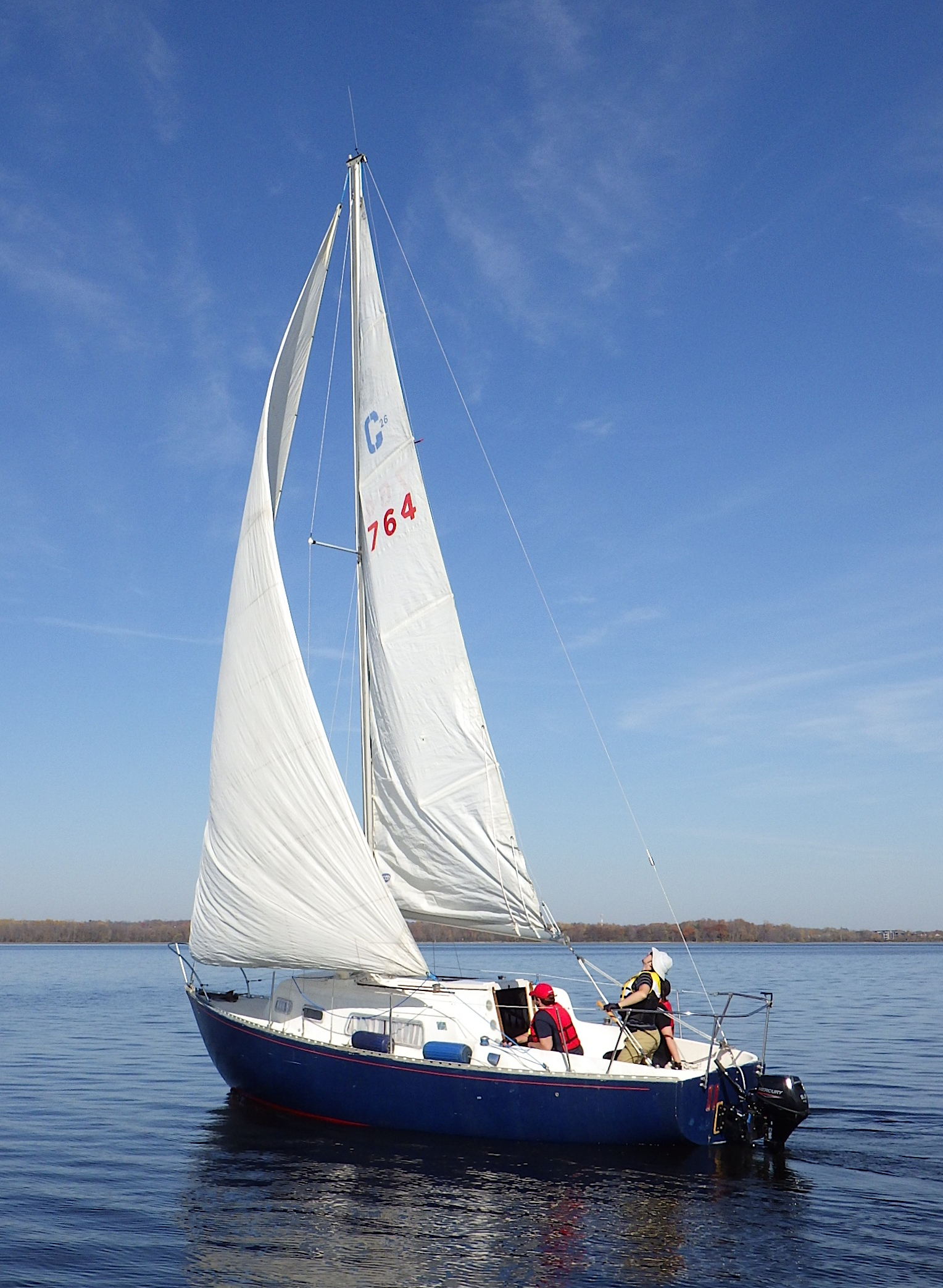
Grampian 26 CB

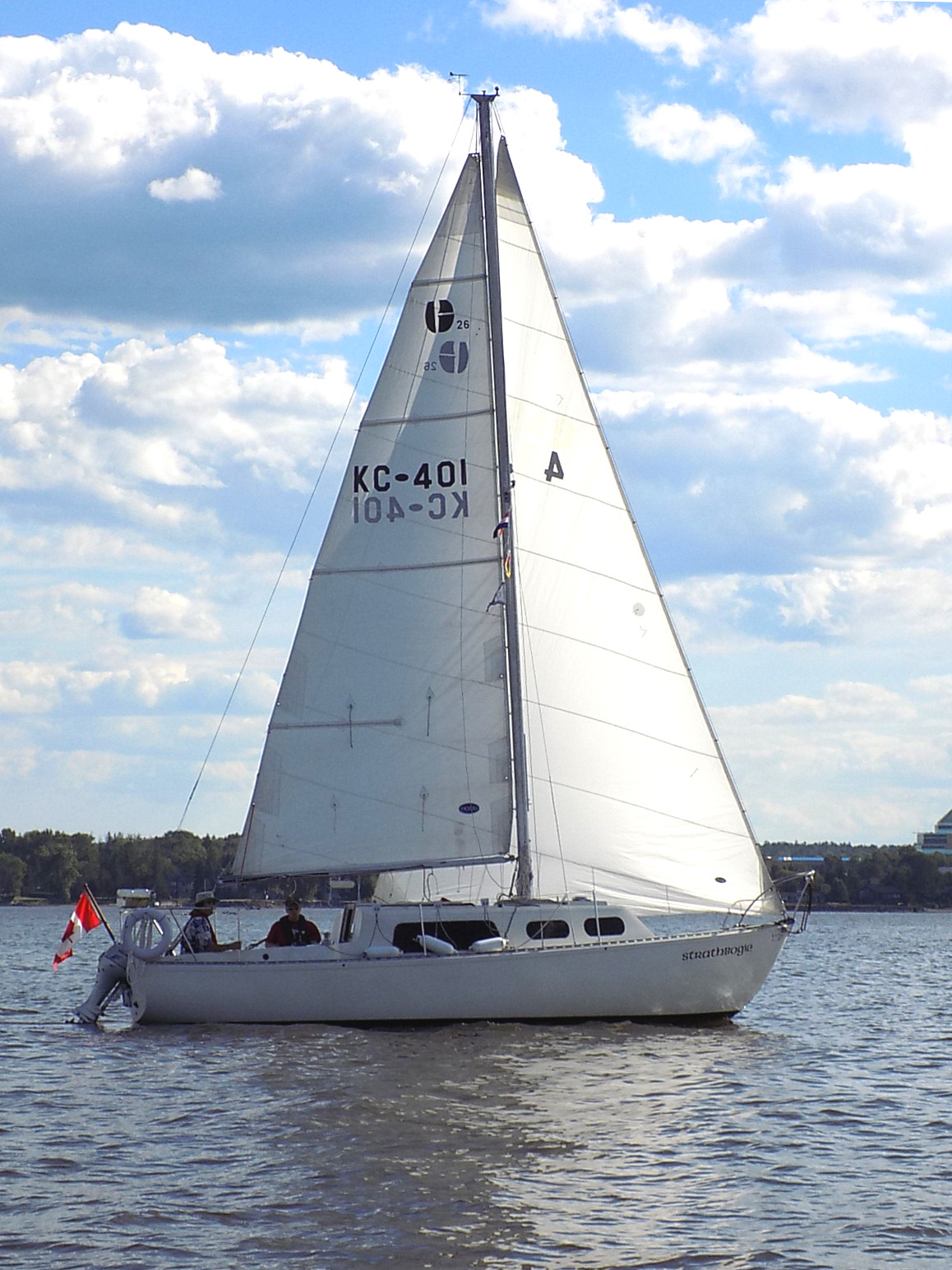
Grampian 26

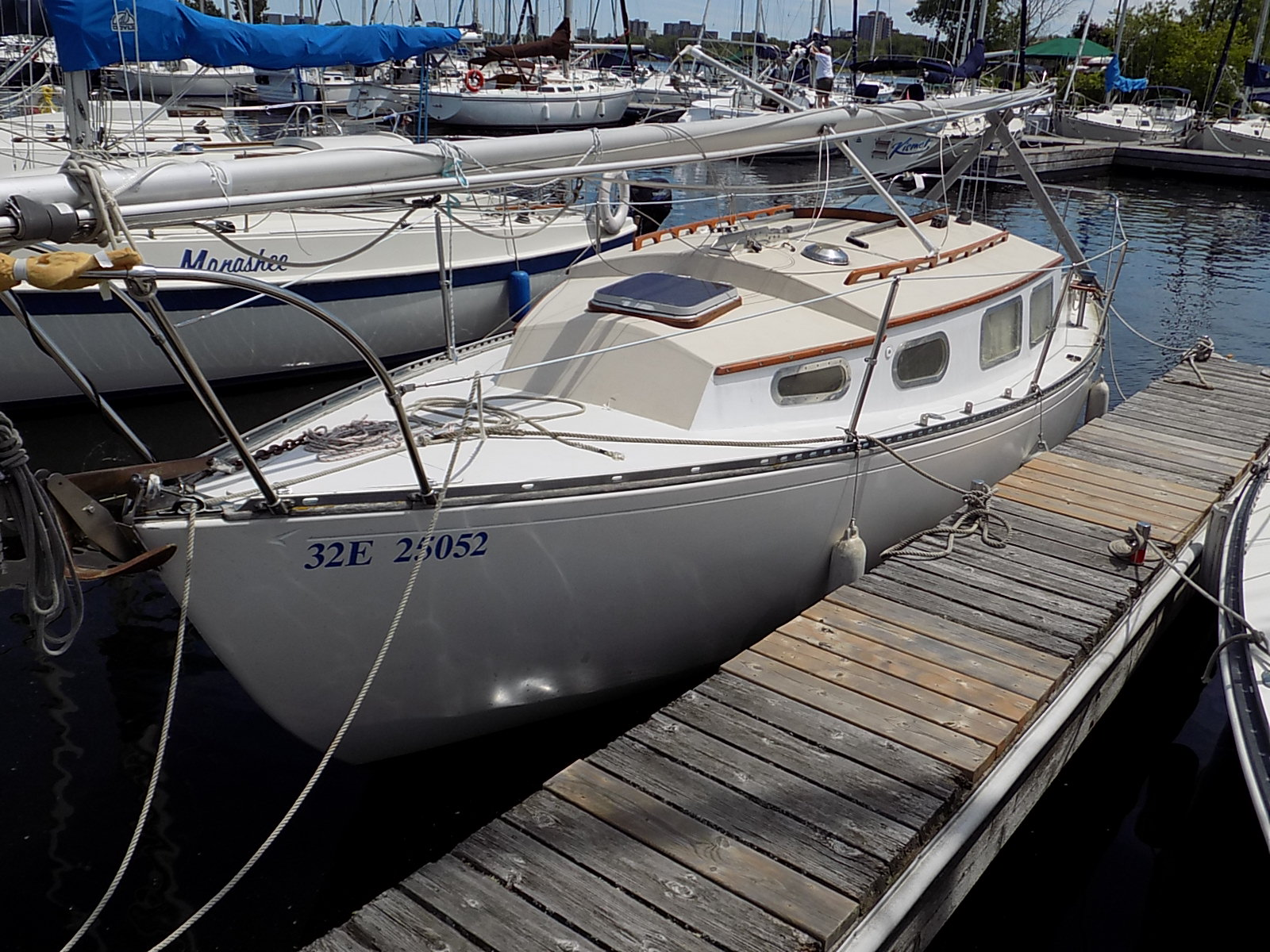
Grampian 26
