= Sandstream 26 =

Sailboat class

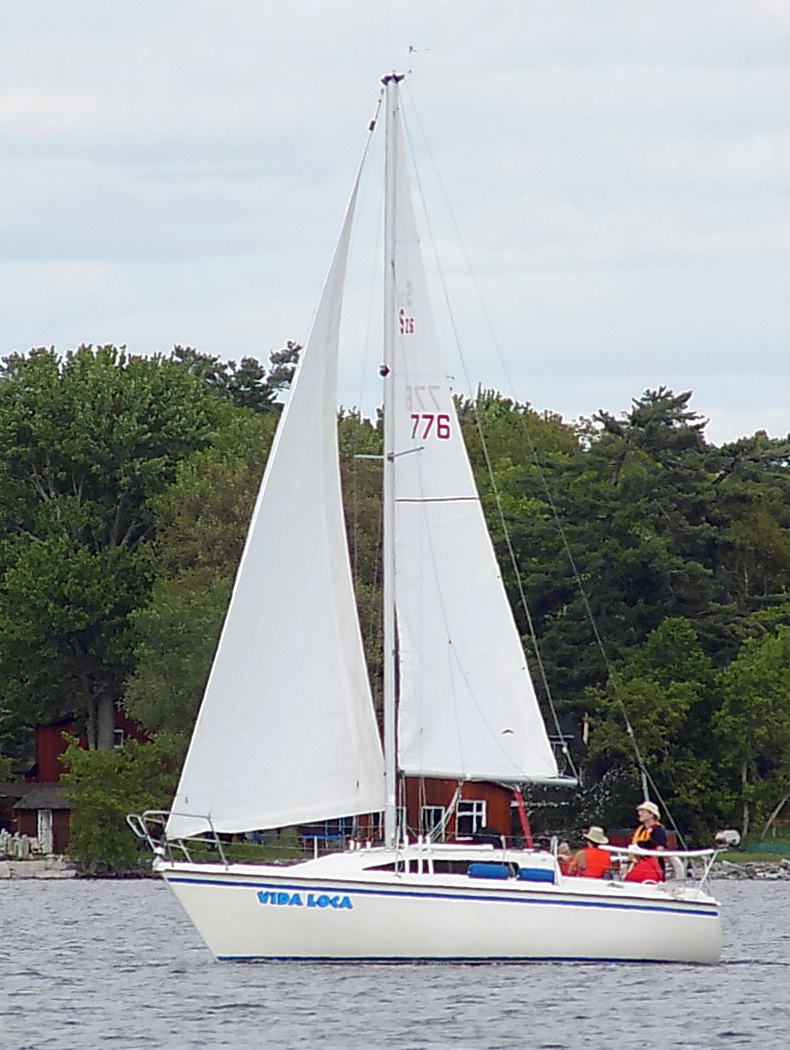

Development
- Location: Canada
- Year: late 1980s
- Builder: Stanlet Hatch
- Name: Sandstream 26

Boat
- Displacement: 4,500 lb (2,041 kg)
- Draft: 3.9 ft (1.2 m)

Hull
- Type: Monohull
- Construction: Fiberglass
- LOA: 26 ft (7.9 m)
- LWL: 24.5 ft (7.5 m)
- Beam: 9.4 ft (2.9 m)
- Engine: Yanmar 8 hp (6 kW) diesel engine

Hull appendages
- Keel: fin keel
- Ballast: 1,800 lb (816 kg)
- Rudder: internally-mounted spade-type rudder

Rig
- General: Masthead sloop
- Mast height: 32 ft (9.8 m)

Racing
- PHRF: 243 (average)

The Sandstream 26 is a Canadian sailboat, that was built in the late 1980s.

== Production ==
The boat was built by Sandstream Yachts a division of Stanlet Hatch, but it is now out of production. The company built boats from 1985 to 1997 in Stouffville, Ontario, Canada, before going out of business.

== Design ==
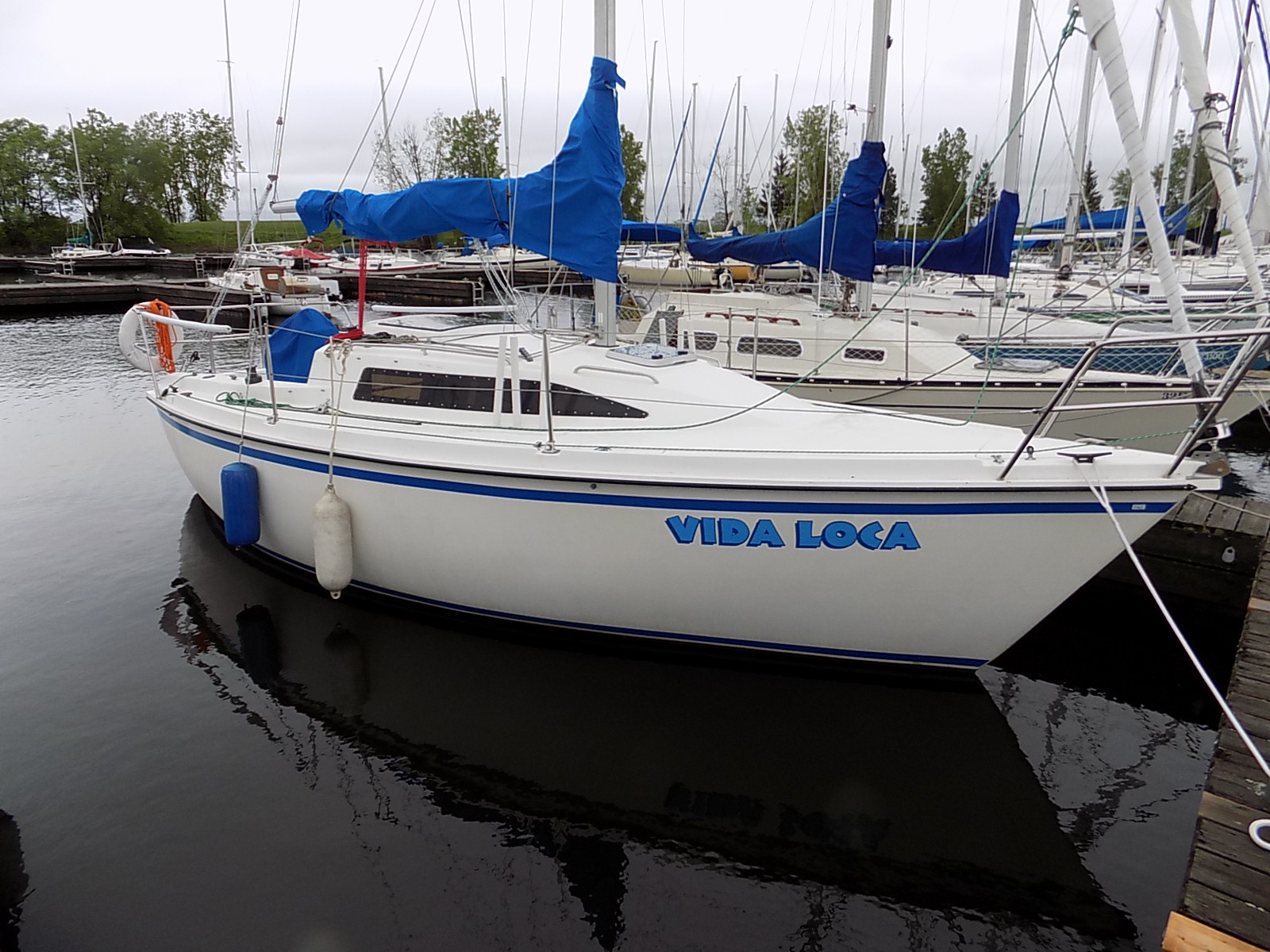
Sandstream 26

The Sandstream 26 is a small recreational keelboat, built predominantly of fiberglass. It has a masthead sloop rig, an internally-mounted spade-type rudder and a fixed fin keel. It displaces 4,500 lb (2,041 kg) and carries 1,800 lb (816 kg) of steel ballast.

The cabin has 71 in (1.8 m) of headroom.

The boat has a draft of 47 in (1.2 m) with the standard keel fitted. It is equipped with a Japanese Yanmar diesel engine of 8 hp (6 kW).

The boat has a PHRF racing average handicap of 243.

== See also ==
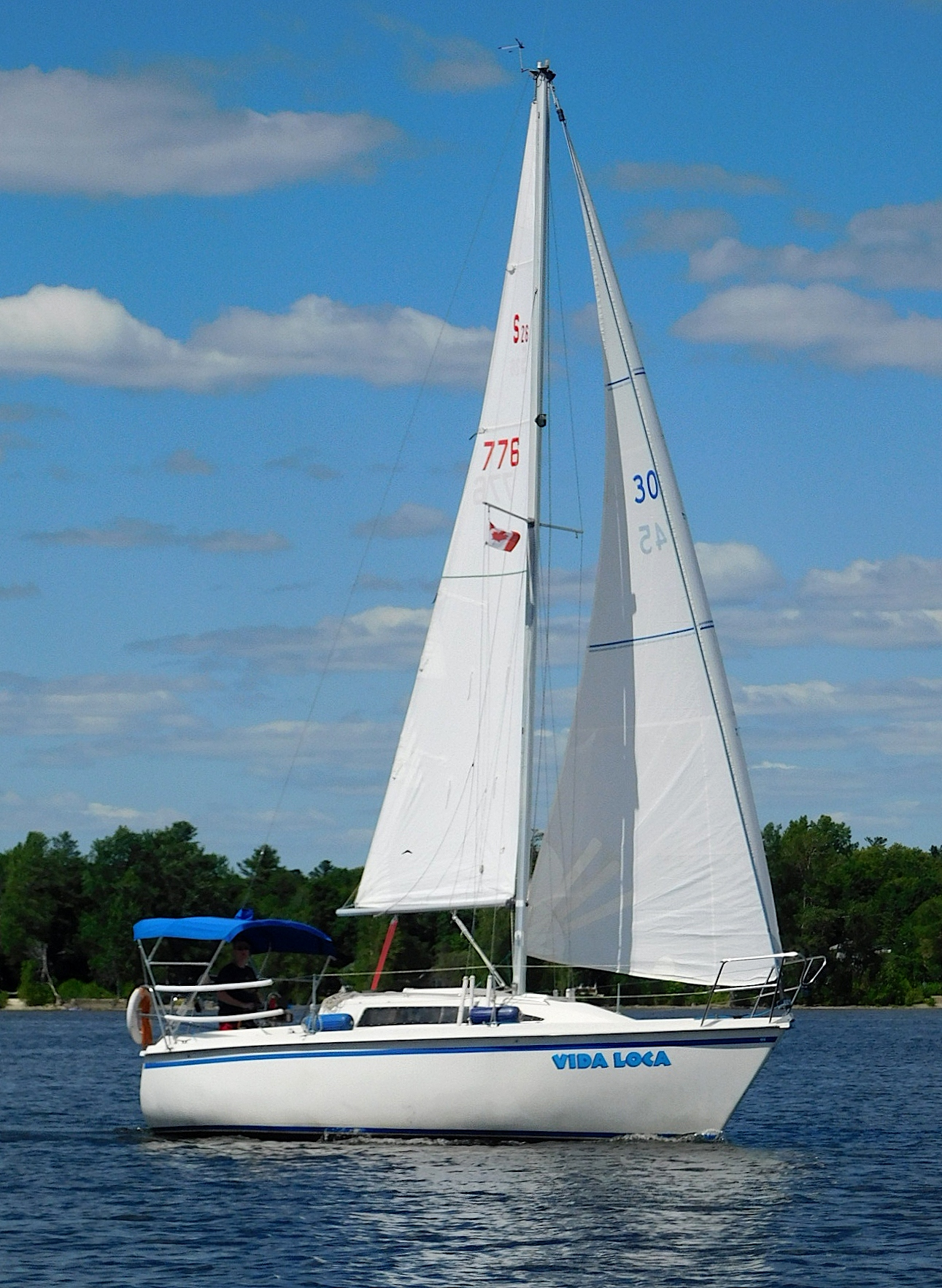
Sandstream 26

- List of sailing boat types
