= Discovery 7.9 =

Sailboat class

Development
- Designer: Alex McGruer
- Location: Canada
- Year: 1975
- Builder: Grampian Marine
- Name: Discovery 7.9

Boat
- Displacement: 5,100 lb (2,313 kg)
- Draft: 3.75 ft (1.14 m)

Hull
- Type: Monohull
- Construction: Fiberglass
- LOA: 26.00 ft (7.92 m)
- LWL: 21.75 ft (6.63 m)
- Beam: 8.33 ft (2.54 m)
- Engine: Inboard motor

Hull appendages
- Keel: fin keel
- Ballast: 2,300 lb (1,043 kg)
- Rudder: transom-mounted rudder

Rig
- Rig type: Bermuda rig
- I foretriangle height: 33.25 ft (10.13 m)
- J foretriangle base: 11.00 ft (3.35 m)
- P mainsail luff: 28.00 ft (8.53 m)
- E mainsail foot: 10.00 ft (3.05 m)

Sails
- Sailplan: Masthead sloop
- Mainsail area: 140.00 sq ft (13.006 m^{2})
- Jib/genoa area: 182.88 sq ft (16.990 m^{2})
- Total sail area: 322.88 sq ft (29.997 m^{2})

The Discovery 7.9 is a Canadian sailboat that was designed by Alex McGruer and first built in 1975.

The Discovery 7.9 is a development of the Grampian 26.

== Production ==
The boat was built by Grampian Marine in Canada between 1975 and 1977, but it is now out of production. Only a small number were completed.

After Grampian's end of production the molds were acquired by a new company who built a small number of boats with different window arrangements.

== Design ==
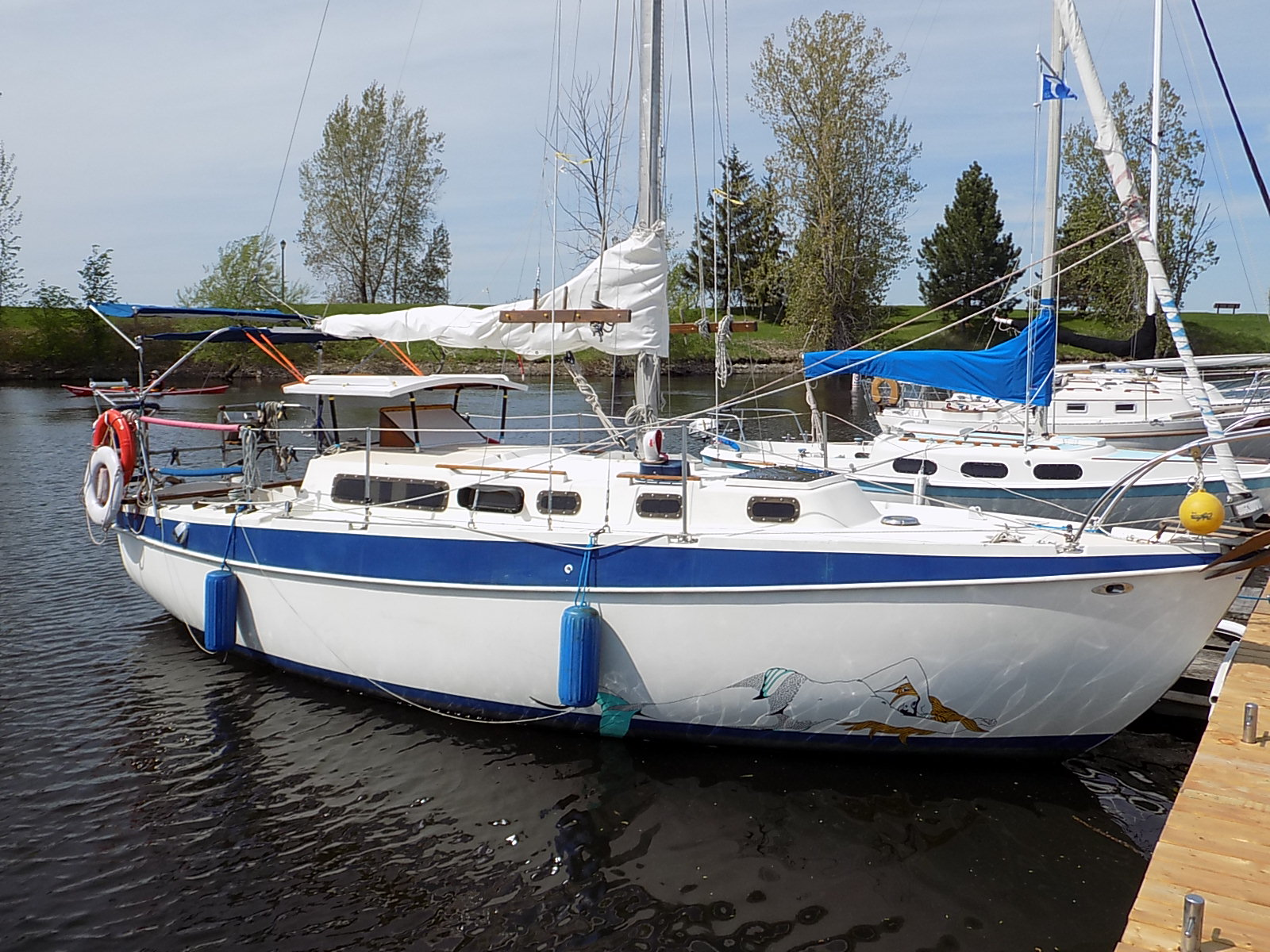
Discovery 7.9

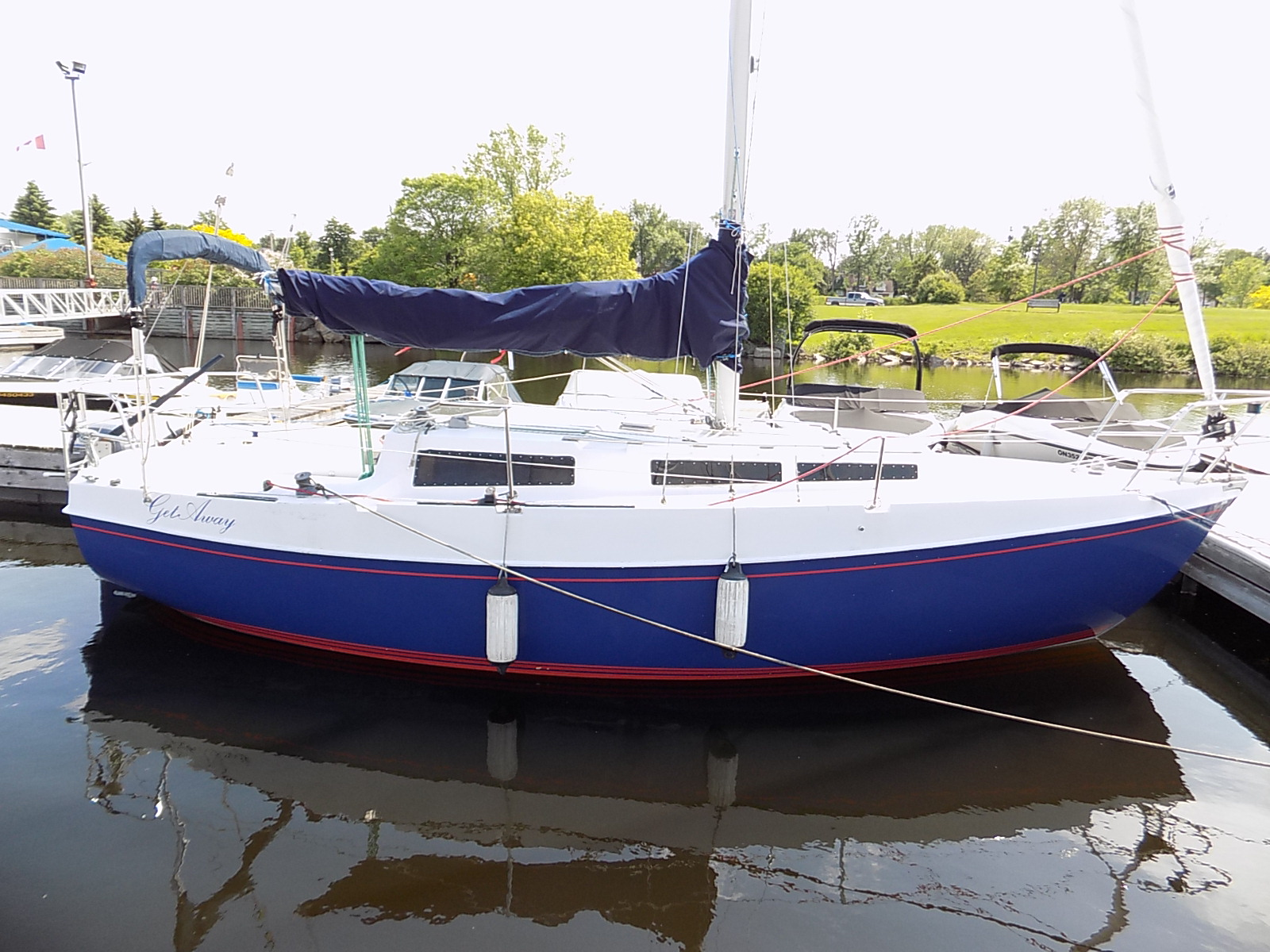
A post production boat, built by a later concern using the same molds, with a different window arrangement

The Discovery 7.9 is a small recreational keelboat, built predominantly of fiberglass, with wood trim. It has a masthead sloop rig, a raked stem, a vertical transom, a transom-hung rudder and a fixed fin keel. It displaces 5,100 lb (2,313 kg) and carries 2,300 lb (1,043 kg) of ballast.

The boat has a draft of 3.75 ft (1.14 m) with the standard keel fitted.

The design has a hull speed of 6.25 kn (11.58 km/h).

== See also ==
- List of sailing boat types
