= ETAP 23i =

Sailboat class

Development
- Designer: Jacques de Ridder
- Location: Belgium
- Year: 1982
- No. built: 700
- Builder: ETAP Yachting
- Role: Cruiser
- Name: ETAP 23i

Boat
- Displacement: 3,306 lb (1,500 kg)
- Draft: 4.80 ft (1.46 m) with the keel down

Hull
- Type: monohull
- Construction: glassfibre
- LOA: 22.44 ft (6.84 m)
- LWL: 19.03 ft (5.80 m)
- Beam: 8.17 ft (2.49 m)

Hull appendages
- Keel: lifting keel
- Ballast: 1,036 lb (470 kg)
- Rudder: transom-mounted rudder

Rig
- Rig type: Bermuda rig
- I foretriangle height: 23.80 ft (7.25 m)
- J foretriangle base: 8.10 ft (2.47 m)
- P mainsail luff: 24.20 ft (7.38 m)
- E mainsail foot: 9.00 ft (2.74 m)

Sails
- Sailplan: fractional rigged sloop
- Mainsail area: 108.90 sq ft (10.117 m^{2})
- Jib/genoa area: 96.39 sq ft (8.955 m^{2})
- Total sail area: 205.29 sq ft (19.072 m^{2})

The ETAP 23i is a Belgian trailerable sailboat that was designed by Jacques de Ridder as a cruiser and first built in 1982.

The ETAP 23i is a development of the ETAP 23. The design was developed into the ETAP 23iL in 1996.

== Production ==
The design was built by ETAP Yachting in Belgium between 1982 and 1994, with 700 boats completed, but it is now out of production.

== Design ==
The ETAP 23i is a recreational keelboat, built predominantly of glassfibre, with wood trim. It has a fractional sloop rig, a raked stem, a plumb transom, a transom-hung rudder controlled by a tiller and a lifting keel. It displaces 3,306 lb (1,500 kg) and carries 1,036 lb (470 kg) of ballast.

The boat has a draft of 4.80 ft (1.46 m) with the lifting keel extended and 2.30 ft (0.70 m) with it retracted, allowing ground transportation on a trailer.

For sailing downwind the design may be equipped with a spinnaker.

== Operational history ==
The boat was at one time supported by a class club, the ETAP Owners Association.

== See also ==
- List of sailing boat types
