= ETAP 34s =

Sailboat class

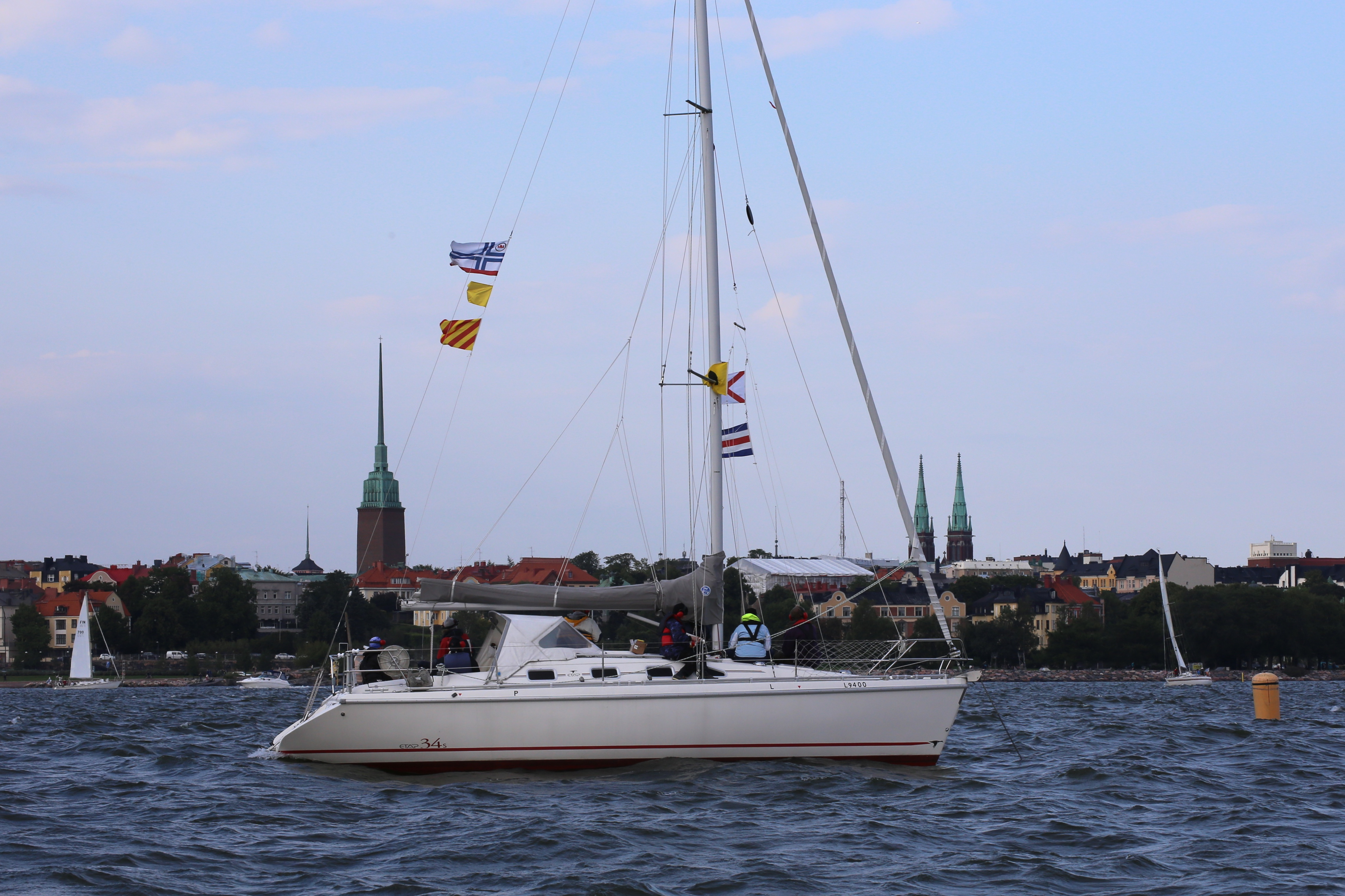

Development
- Designer: Mortain & Mavrikios
- Location: Belgium
- Year: 1997
- No. built: 85
- Builder: ETAP Yachting
- Role: Cruiser
- Name: ETAP 34s

Boat
- Displacement: 10,000 lb (4,536 kg)
- Draft: 6.07 ft (1.85 m)

Hull
- Type: monohull
- Construction: glassfibre
- LOA: 34.87 ft (10.63 m)
- LWL: 29.76 ft (9.07 m)
- Beam: 11.55 ft (3.52 m)
- Engine: Volvo diesel engine

Hull appendages
- Keel: fin keel
- Ballast: 3,200 lb (1,451 kg)
- Rudder: internally-mounted spade-type rudder

Rig
- Rig type: Bermuda rig

Sails
- Sailplan: fractional rigged sloop
- Total sail area: 680.00 sq ft (63.174 m^{2})

The ETAP 34s is a Belgian sailboat that was designed by Mortain & Mavrikios as a cruiser and first built in 1997.

The design is a development of the ETAP 35i.

== Production ==
The design was built by ETAP Yachting in Belgium between 1997 and 2006, with 85 boats completed, but it is now out of production.

== Design ==
The ETAP 34s is a recreational keelboat, built predominantly of polyester glassfibre, with wood trim. The design uses a glassfibre foam-cored structure that provides buoyancy and renders it unsinkable. It has a fractional sloop rig, a raked stem; a raised counter, reverse transom with steps and a swimming platform; an internally mounted spade-type rudder controlled by a wheel and a fixed fin keel. It displaces 10,000 lb (4,536 kg) and carries 3,200 lb (1,451 kg) of iron ballast.

The boat has a draft of 6.07 ft (1.85 m) with the standard keel.

The boat is fitted with a Swedish Volvo diesel engine for docking and manoeuvring. The fuel tank holds 24 U.S. gallons (91 L; 20 imp gal) and the fresh water tank has a capacity of 45 U.S. gallons (170 L; 37 imp gal).

The design has sleeping accommodation for six people, with a double "V"-berth in the bow cabin, two straight settees in the main cabin around a drop-leaf table and an aft cabin with a double berth on the port side. The galley is located on the port side just forward of the companionway ladder. The galley is L-shaped and is equipped with a two-burner stove, am ice box and two round sinks. A navigation station is opposite the galley, on the starboard side. The head is located just aft of the navigation station on the starboard side and includes a shower.

== Operational history ==
The boat was at one time supported by a class club, the ETAP Owners Association.

A 2005 review in Yachting Monthly described the design, "in 1997 Etap decided that its individualistic designs, while applauded in some quarters, were not working in the marketplace so the company decided on a makeover. This was the first result. She is based on the 1991 Harlé Mortain Etap 35 with a new, full length coachroof and a revised interior layout by Mortain & Mavrikios. She has a taller rig than her predecessor, is a sharp performer and handles well. Below decks, décor switched from light beech wood trims in the early 34s to striking, rich mahoganies later on. Headroom throughout is good but the fit-out is of the no-frills variety. She has six berths in three cabins, the galley is good and the heads is roomy."

== See also ==
- List of sailing boat types
