= Jakopin =

Jakopin is a Slovenian surname. As of 2024, it was the 1092th most common surname in Slovenia.

- Japec Jakopin (born 1951), Slovenian yacht concept designer
- John Jakopin (born 1975), Canadian ice hockey player
- Primož Jakopin (born 1949), Slovenian computer scientist and linguist
