= J&J Design =

Architecture company based in Ljubljana, Slovenia

- Type: Privately held company
- Industry: Naval architecture, Industrial design, Marine engineering
- Founded: 1983
- Founders: Japec Jakopin and Jernej Jakopin
- Headquarters: Ljubljana, Slovenia
- Area served: Worldwide
- Services: Yacht design and engineering
- Website: www.jnj.design

J&J Design is a naval architecture, design, boat and production-process engineering company, mainly for high-volume production sail and powerboat builders, headquartered in Slovenia. It introduced the carbon-epoxy technology from the America's Cup into cruising sailboats with the Shipman line. J&J also designed and engineered the first serial production hybrid powerboats, the Greenline Hybrid range.

== History ==
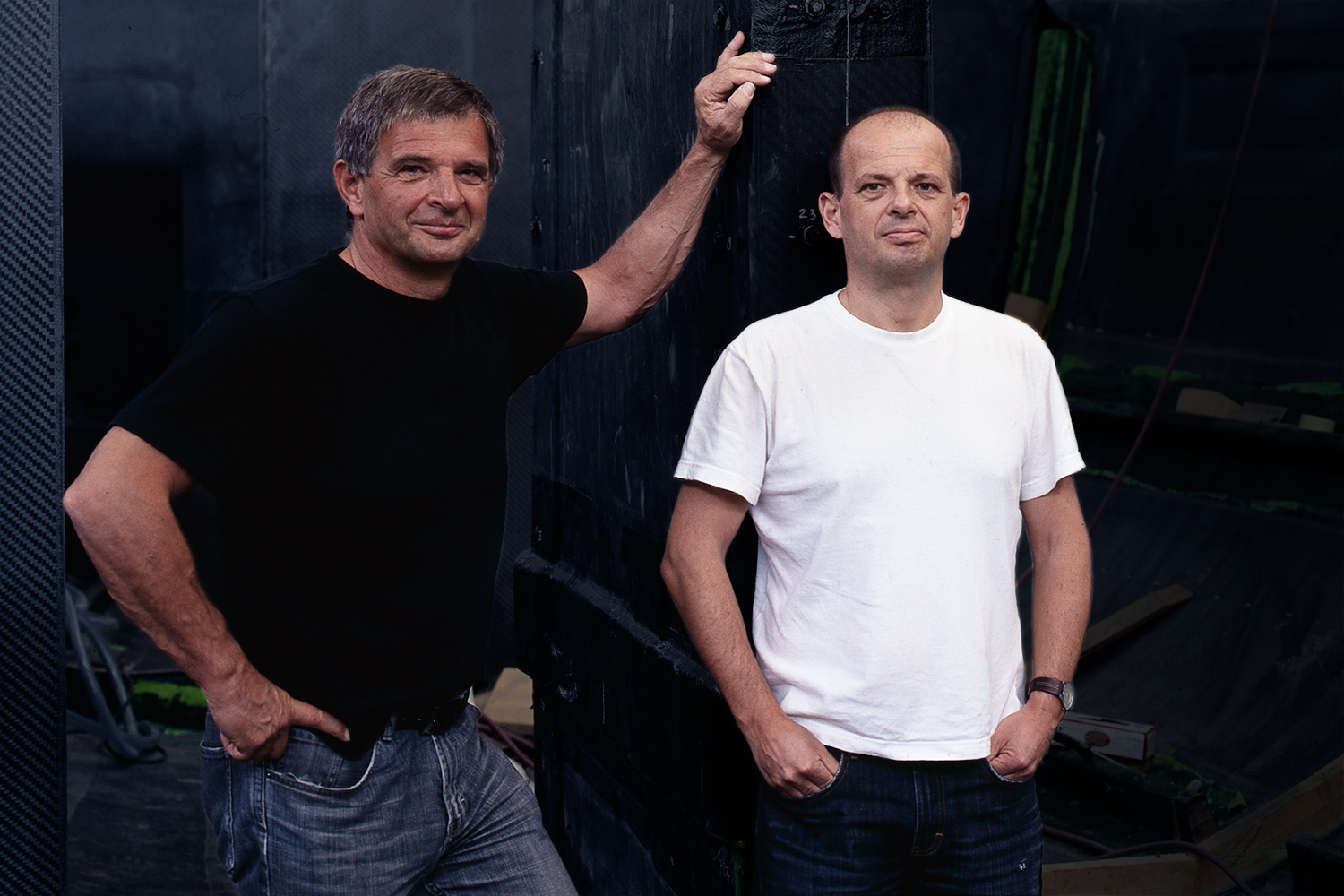
Founders of J&J Design

J&J Design was founded in 1983 by brothers Japec Jakopin and Jernej Jakopin in Ljubljana, SR Slovenia, Jugoslavia Japec, the elder brother learned to sail by the age of 13. After graduating from the Medical school at the University of Ljubljana in 1974 he pursued an academic career at that school's Institute of Physiology and at the University Medical Centre. During that time he spent the weekends designing and building do-it-yourself boats, and operating a sailboat charter base. In 1983 CEO of Elan, the main Slovenian sporting goods (including recreational boats) manufacturer, accepted his proposal to come up with a better sailboat model. Younger brother Jernej Jakopin, an architect with a degree from Westlawn Institute of Marine Technology, joined in and J&J Design was founded. Elan 31 sailboat was its first project.

Elan 31 was followed by Elan 33, 34, 38 and 43. In 1985, skippered by Dušan Puh, Elan 31R won the production boat prize at the Three Quarter Ton World Championship in Marstrand, Sweden. Elan sold 940 units of the Elan 31 and 33, and between 1983 and 1987 increased its marine sales from DEM 2 M to DEM 32 M (2.6 M US$ to 42 M US$, as of 2016, inflation adjusted). After 1987, when the new management of Elan decided to refocus on ski production, J&J Design continued designing boats for other European boatyards, mainly for Jeanneau.

== Seaway ==
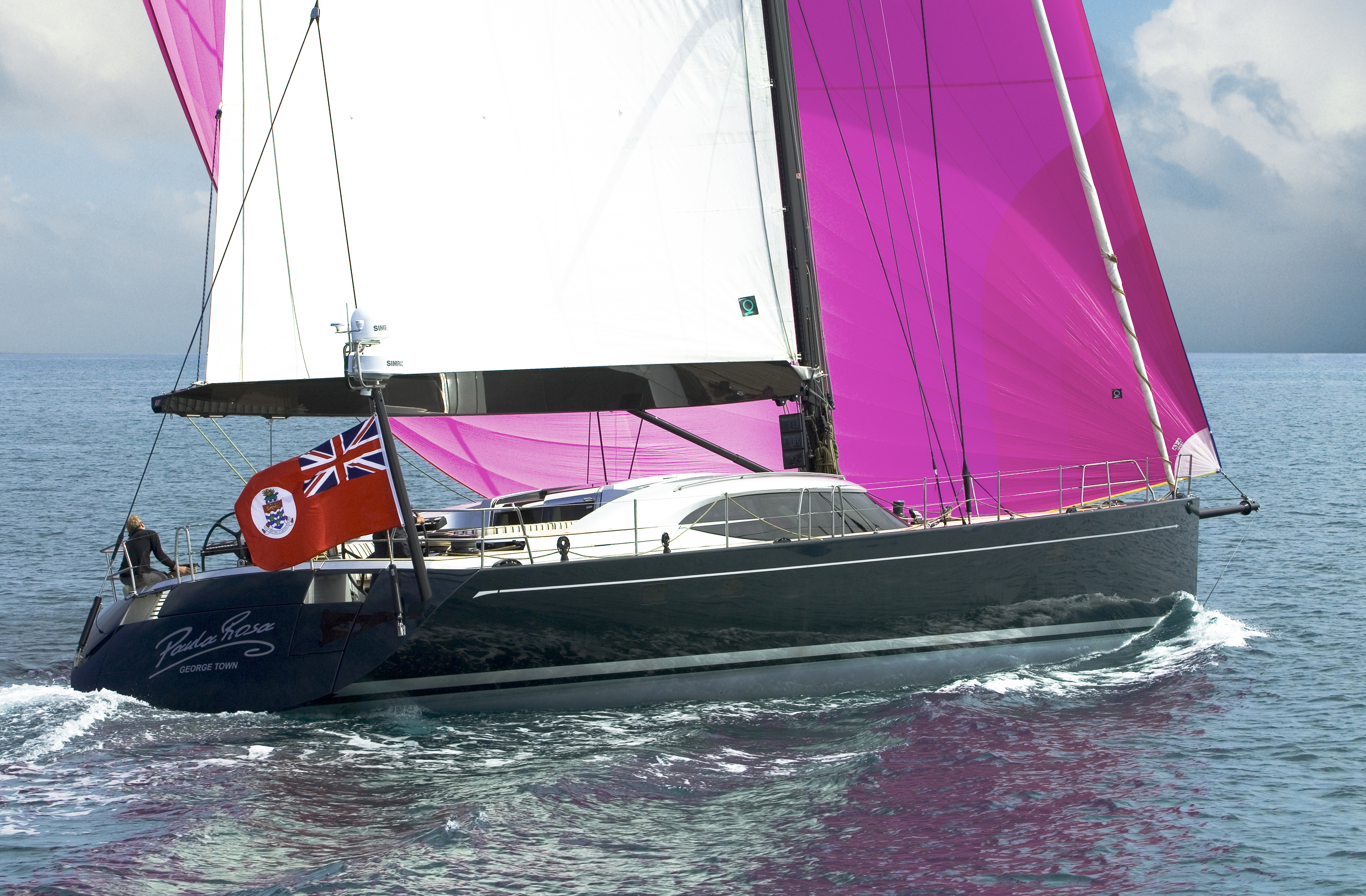
Shipman 80 carbon yacht under sail

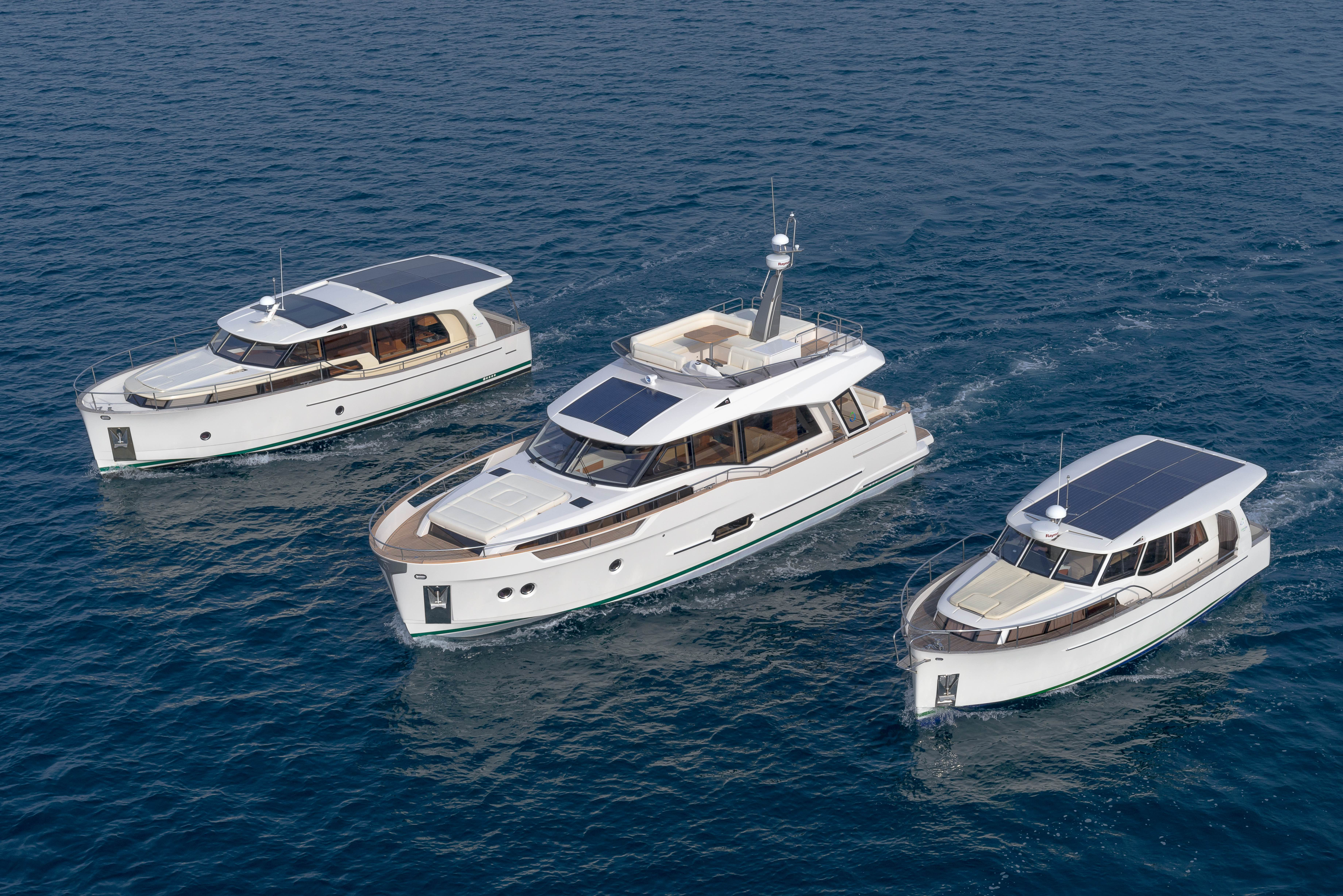
Greenline Hybrid lineup: GL 40, GL 48 and GL 33 in the Bay of Piran, 2014

In 1989 the two brothers founded a broader company, Seaway, expanding the design to engineering, tooling and prototyping for boat manufacturers.

By 2000 Seaway became the only independent company outside major yacht builders that could engage in the entire boat development process - from design to prototype and final moulds, for a list of clients that included Bavaria, Jeanneau, Dufour Yachts and Grand Soleil. Its revenue grew to 6.6 M Euros.

KD Group, one of the largest Slovenian private finance groups, invested 3 M Euros in the company in 2001, for a 50% share and a request for change of strategy to own boat production. This investment enabled the purchase of a robot for precise prototype and mould production, required by Seaway's customers and acquisition of new, larger premises for installation of the new tool.

In 2003 J&J Design developed, in cooperation with Jørgen Bonde from Denmark, the new-era Shipman sailing boat, Shipman 50, the first singlehanded high-performance pilothouse offshore cruiser. New carbon/epoxy prepreg technology (Carbon fiber reinforced polymer), previously only used in competition sailing such as the America's Cup, made possible the transition to lighter, faster and more efficient production cruising yachts. Shipman 50 was followed by bigger Shipman 63, Shipman 72 and Shipman 80 models.

In 2009 a hybrid powerboat with diesel, electric and solar propulsion was developed and produced, the 33 feet (10 m) long Greenline Hybrid 33.

Its main appeal besides the hybrid propulsion with zero-emission and no-noise sailing was the constant availability of 110/230 VAC power for appliances. Arguably the best-selling 10 m boat in 2010 and 2011 it sold 400 units by 2015, and was followed by larger models, GL 40 in 2011, Ocean Class 70 in 2012 and GL 48 in 2014.

Hybrid technology was also applied to the sailing boat line, to the Shipman 59 Hybrid Solar Carbon in 2014, designed together with Doug Peterson and the French naval architect Guillaume Verdier.

The Great Recession had a severe impact on the pleasure boat sector. It crippled the production at Seaway and despite the full order book in 2015 both divisions of the company went out of business.

== J&J Design Revival ==
The boatbuilding part of Seaway (Greenline and Shipman ranges) was taken over by Vladimir Zinchenko (SVP Yachts, later Greenline Yachts, as of 2024 they produced 8 Greenline models from 39 to 58 feet) while Jakopin brothers reestablished J&J Design as an independent company with Japec Jakopin and Jernej Jakopin as the CEOs and with a team of 25 designers and engineers.

The company continued to work for major volume boatbuilders in the power and sailing area, including the Greenline builder SVP Yachts, by providing design as well as boat engineering and production process engineering for vessels from 20 to 80 feet.

At 40 years of the office a monograph entitled Forty Years of J&J Studio 1983-2023, edited by Shannon Jamieson Vasquez, was published by the publishing house Morski vodiči in Zagreb, Croatia. The book covers the history, 40 projects with profile drawing, technical data, the yacht's story and accomplishments of the office in the fields of naval architecture, exterior and interior design, comfort and convenience features, materials and engineering as well as green boating. Until 2024 J&J produced more than 350 designs from which 75,000 boats and yachts were built by boatbuilders in 30 countries.

During the Boat Builder Awards 2024 event in Amsterdam, organized by RAI Amsterdam and Boat International Media, the founders of J&J Design were awarded the title of "Designer of the Year", as pioneers in carbon epoxy and hybrid power technologies as well as for their influence across a wide part of the boatbuilding industry.

== Awarded Designs ==
J&J designs have won over 121 Boat of the Year, Design or Environmental awards. European Yacht of the Year (awarded annually since 2001) and European Powerboat of the Year (since 2005) prize winning designs are listed below.

Year	Name	Propulsion	Category	Description
2004	Shipman 50	Sail	Overall winner	First production cruising sailboat in carbon technology
2006	Shipman 63	Sail	Yachts over 14 m	Shorthanded deckhouse performance cruiser
2007	Salona 37	Sail	Yachts 10 – 12 m	New generation cruiser-racer for the largest Croatian boatbuilder
2009	Bavaria 30 Sport HT	Power	Powerboats till 10 m	An intuitive handling boat
2009	Marex 37	Power	Powerboats 10 – 12 m	New aft cabin walkaround concept, with E. Thorup
2009	Windy 44	Power	Powerboats 12 – 14 m	High performance hull of light and strong build
2010	Greenline 33	Power	Special award for innovation	First production diesel-electric-photovoltaic boat
2011	Monte Carlo Yachts 76	Sail	Yachts over 50 feet	Innovative boat assembly concept, with Nuvolari Lenard
2012	Prestige 500 F	Power	Powerboats over 45 feet	New interior concept in a large volume hull, with Studio Garroni
2016	Grand Soleil 46 LC	Sail	Luxury cruisers	Shorthanded performance cruiser with a new protected steering station
2018	ClubSwan 50	Sail	Performance cruisers	Performance cruiser and grand-prix racing yacht, with Juan Kouyoumdjian
2019	Sunbeam 46.1	Sail	Luxury cruisers	Long distance cruiser suitable for shorthanded sailing
2021	Saxdor 200 Sport	Power	Powerboats up to 8 m	New family outboard powered watercraft
2021	Fjord 41 XL	Power	Powerboats up to 14 m	Fast weekend cruiser, with Patrick Banfield

== Other designs ==
- ETAP 39s
- Sun Dance 36
- Sun Odyssey 36
- Sun Way 21
- Bavaria 35 Match
- Bavaria 38 Match
- Bavaria 42 Match
