= ETAP 26 =

Sailboat class

Development
- Designer: E. G. van de Stadt
- Location: Belgium
- Year: 1982
- No. built: 500
- Builder: ETAP Yachting
- Role: Cruiser

Boat
- Displacement: 5,084 lb (2,306 kg)
- Draft: 5.25 ft (1.60 m) with keel down

Hull
- Type: monohull
- Construction: glassfibre
- LOA: 25.75 ft (7.85 m)
- LWL: 21.65 ft (6.60 m)
- Beam: 9.02 ft (2.75 m)
- Engine: inboard motor

Hull appendages
- Keel: lifting keel
- Ballast: 1,568 lb (711 kg)
- Rudder: internally-mounted spade-type rudder

Rig
- Rig type: Bermuda rig
- I foretriangle height: 29.36 ft (8.95 m)
- J foretriangle base: 9.68 ft (2.95 m)
- P mainsail luff: 29.20 ft (8.90 m)
- E mainsail foot: 9.84 ft (3.00 m)

Sails
- Sailplan: fractional rigged sloop
- Mainsail area: 143.66 sq ft (13.346 m^{2})
- Jib/genoa area: 142.10 sq ft (13.202 m^{2})
- Total sail area: 285.77 sq ft (26.549 m^{2})

The ETAP 26 is a Belgian trailerable sailboat that was designed by E. G. van de Stadt as a cruiser and first built in 1982.

== Production ==
The design was built by ETAP Yachting in Belgium between 1982 and 1989, with 500 boats completed, but it is now out of production.

== Design ==
The ETAP 26 is a recreational keelboat, built predominantly of glassfibre, with wood trim. It has a fractional sloop rig, a raked stem, plumb transom, an internally mounted spade-type rudder controlled by a tiller and a lifting keel. It displaces 5,084 lb (2,306 kg) and carries 1,568 lb (711 kg) of ballast.

The boat has a draft of 5.25 ft (1.60 m) with the lifting keel extended and 3.11 ft (0.95 m) with it retracted, allowing ground transportation on a trailer.

The boat is fitted with an inboard engine with a saildrive for docking and manoeuvring. The fuel tank holds 7 U.S. gallons (26 L; 5.8 imp gal).

The design has sleeping accommodation for five people, with a double "V"-berth in the bow cabin and two straight settee quarter berths in the main cabin with a drop-leaf table that allows one to be converted to a double berth. The galley is located on the port side just forward of the companionway ladder. The galley is L-shaped and is equipped with a two-burner stove, an icebox and a sink. A navigation station is amidships, on the starboard side. The head is located just aft of the bow cabin.

For sailing downwind the design may be equipped with a spinnaker.

The design has a hull speed of 6.24 kn (11.56 km/h).

== Operational history ==
The boat was at one time supported by a class club, the ETAP Owners Association.

A 2009 review in Yachting Monthly stated, "the largest of the lifting-keel Etaps, launched in 1981, the 26 manages a proper heads compartment amidships and an inboard engine powering a saildrive. She is designed to right herself with the keel fully up, but many owners tend to sail with it permanently down, because the mechanism for lifting this large chunk of ballast manually requires a good 15 minutes of winch-grinding at the foot of the mast. Some 26s have an electric servo motor to relieve this burden. The deck-stepped 7/8 fractional rig has sweptback spreaders and an adjustable backstay. All sail controls are led back to the cockpit. She is fast and commendably stiff under sail, and goes well to windward with a tacking angle of 75-80°, but needs to be sailed fairly flat to avoid weather helm. She has an unusual cabin layout, dictated by the large lifting keel. The chart table is at the forward end of the saloon and the navigator is obliged to work sitting sideways-on. She has four sea-going berths, or potentially five at anchor: two straight settees in the saloon, one of which converts to a double, and a vee-berth in the forepeak."

== See also ==
- List of sailing boat types
