= Japec Jakopin =

Slovenian yacht designer

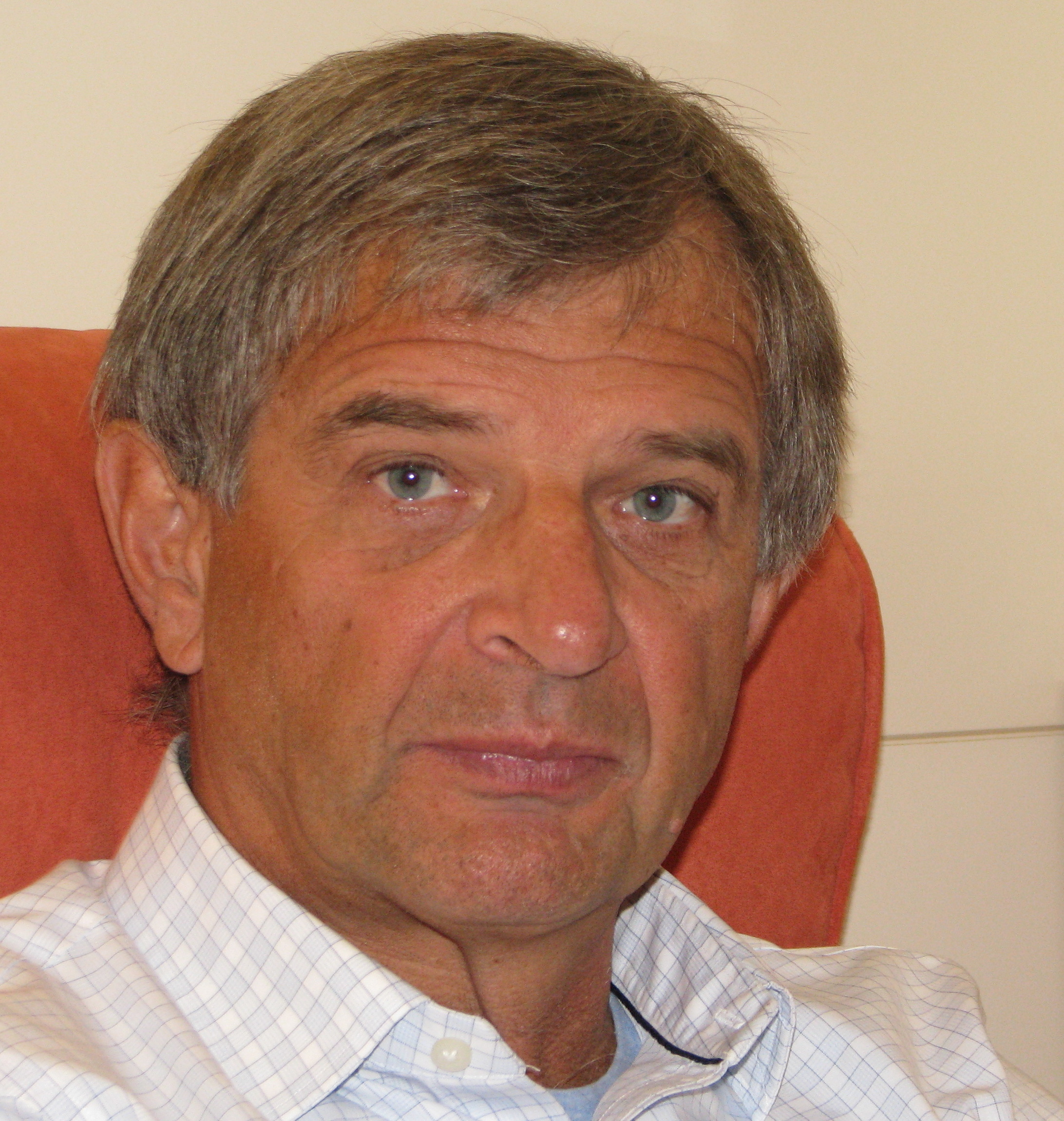
- Born: 19 April 1951 (age 74); Brežice, Slovenia
- Occupation: CEO of J&J Design
- Years active: 1971 - present
- Spouses: Nataša Jordan (m. 1974–1992); Maruša Mohorč (m. 1998)
- Children: Tilen, Eva, Jakob, Gitica and Jadran

Japec Jakopin (pron. Yapets Yacopeen), born 19 April 1951, is the CEO of J&J Design, a pleasure boat design company, based in Slovenia, which he founded in 1983, together with his brother Jernej. Jakopin is most known as a yacht concept designer.

== Early life and education ==
Jakopin was born in 1951 in Brežice, Slovenia. The family lived in the nearby village of Leskovec pri Krškem.

Japec began freediving at the age of six and learned to sail by the age of 13. From 1964 to 1972 he competed in diving at the Ljubljana Swimming Club. In 1964 he achieved 2nd place at the Slovenian championship and 3rd at the Yugoslavian championship (junior category, up to 15 years), in 1965 he won both championships, in 1967 and 1968 he won both championships in youth category (up to 18 years, in both disciplines: 3 m springboard and 10 m platform). In 1972 he was Yugoslavian champion in 10 m platform.

After graduating from the Medical school at the University of Ljubljana in 1974 he pursued an academic career at that school's Institute of Physiology and at the University Medical Centre, Department of Intensive Internal Medicine. In 1977 he obtained a master's degree in cardiology, of problems connected to arrhythmia, also during freediving, in 1980 a PhD and in 1981 the title academic specialist in cardiology. In 1983 he resigned from his academic (and medical) career because of political issues.

== Yacht design ==
During his academic years Jakopin spent his weekends in the Croatian seaside town of Punat building do-it-yourself boats, and later learned the charter yacht business. After leaving the medical profession in 1983 Japec, together with his younger brother Jernej, founded J&J Design studio, for production yacht design. In 1983 they designed the Elan 31 sailing boat for the Elan sporting goods factory of Begunje, Slovenia, followed by Elan 33. Between 1983 and 1987 Elan sold 940 units of the Elan 31, Elan 33 and Elan 43, increasing its marine sales from DEM 2 million to DEM 32 million. In 1987, Japec took a marketing and sales manager job at the French sailboat and powerboat builder Jeanneau where he stayed until 1990. In the meantime J&J Design continued designing boats for Jeanneau and several other European boatyards.

== Expansion into boat development and production ==
In 1989 the two brothers founded Seaway, also in Slovenia, to expand J&J Design activities to engineering, tooling and prototyping for boat manufacturers. By 2000 Seaway became the only independent company outside major yacht builders that could engage in the entire development process - from design to prototype and final moulds, and its revenue grew to 6.6 million euros. The list of clients included Bavaria, Beneteau and Jeanneau. In 2001 KD Group, the largest Slovenian private finance group, invested 3 million euros in the company, for a 50% share and a request for change of strategy to own boat production. Investment enabled the purchase of a robot for precise prototype and mould production, required by Seaway's customers and acquisition of new, larger premises for installation of the new tool.

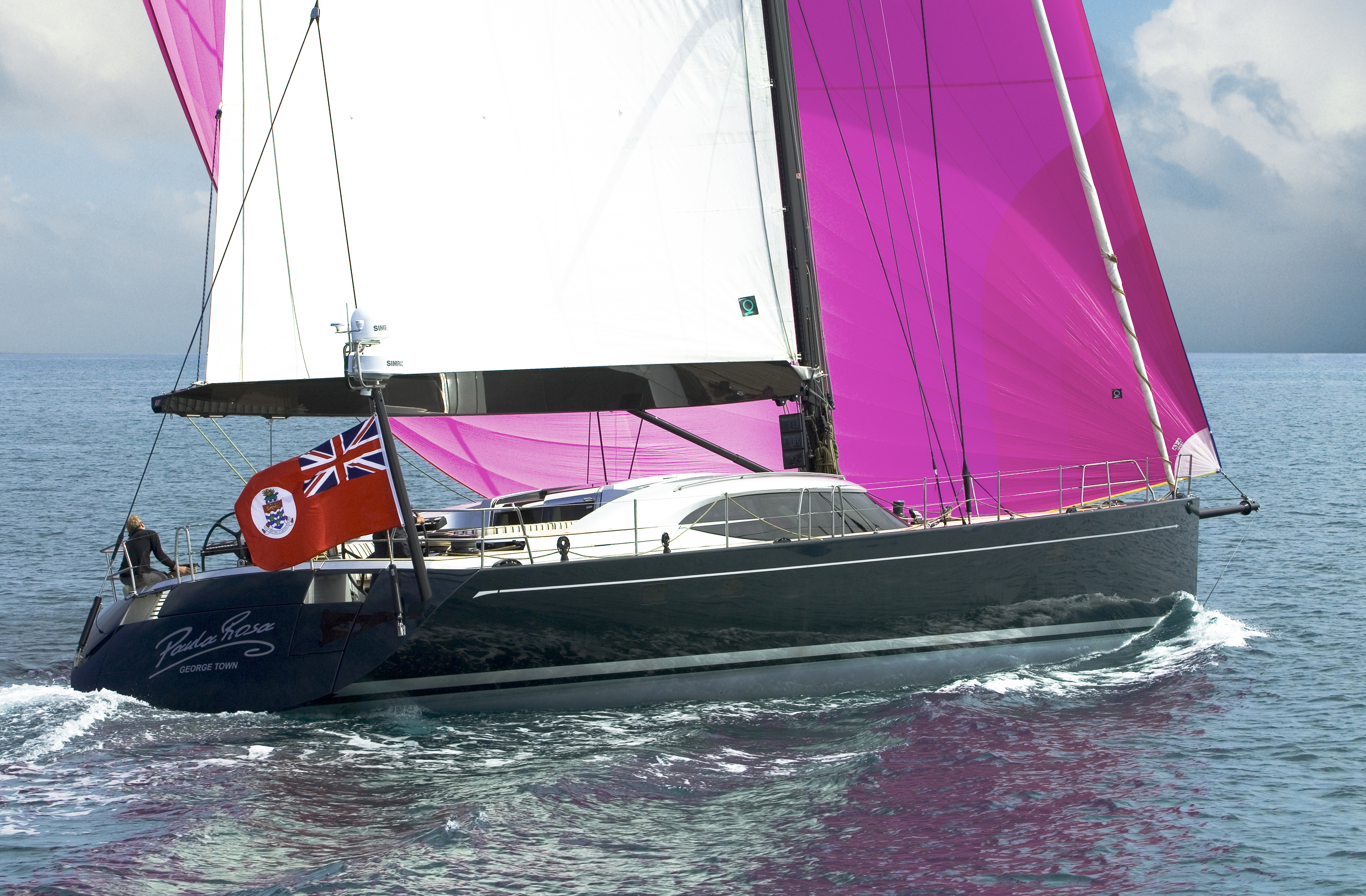
Shipman 80 carbon yacht sailing in apparent wind

Seaway produced a limited number of high-class yachts and powerboats, the Shipman carbon sailboat line from 2002 and Skagen powerboat line from 2004.

The Shipman 50 and Shipman 63 won the 2003 and 2006 European Boat of the Year Award at the Boot Düsseldorf boat show.

In 2009 a hybrid powerboat with diesel, electric and solar propulsion was developed and produced, the 33 feet (10 m) long Greenline Hybrid 33 (GH 33). It also won the 2010 European Boat of the Year Award at the Boot Düsseldorf boat show. Its main appeal besides the hybrid propulsion with zero-emission and no-noise sailing was the constant availability of 110/230 VAC power for appliances. It sold 400 units by 2015, claimed to be the best-selling 10 m boat in 2010 and 2011, and was followed by larger models, GL 40 in 2011, Greenline Ocean Class 70 in 2012 and GL 48 in 2014.

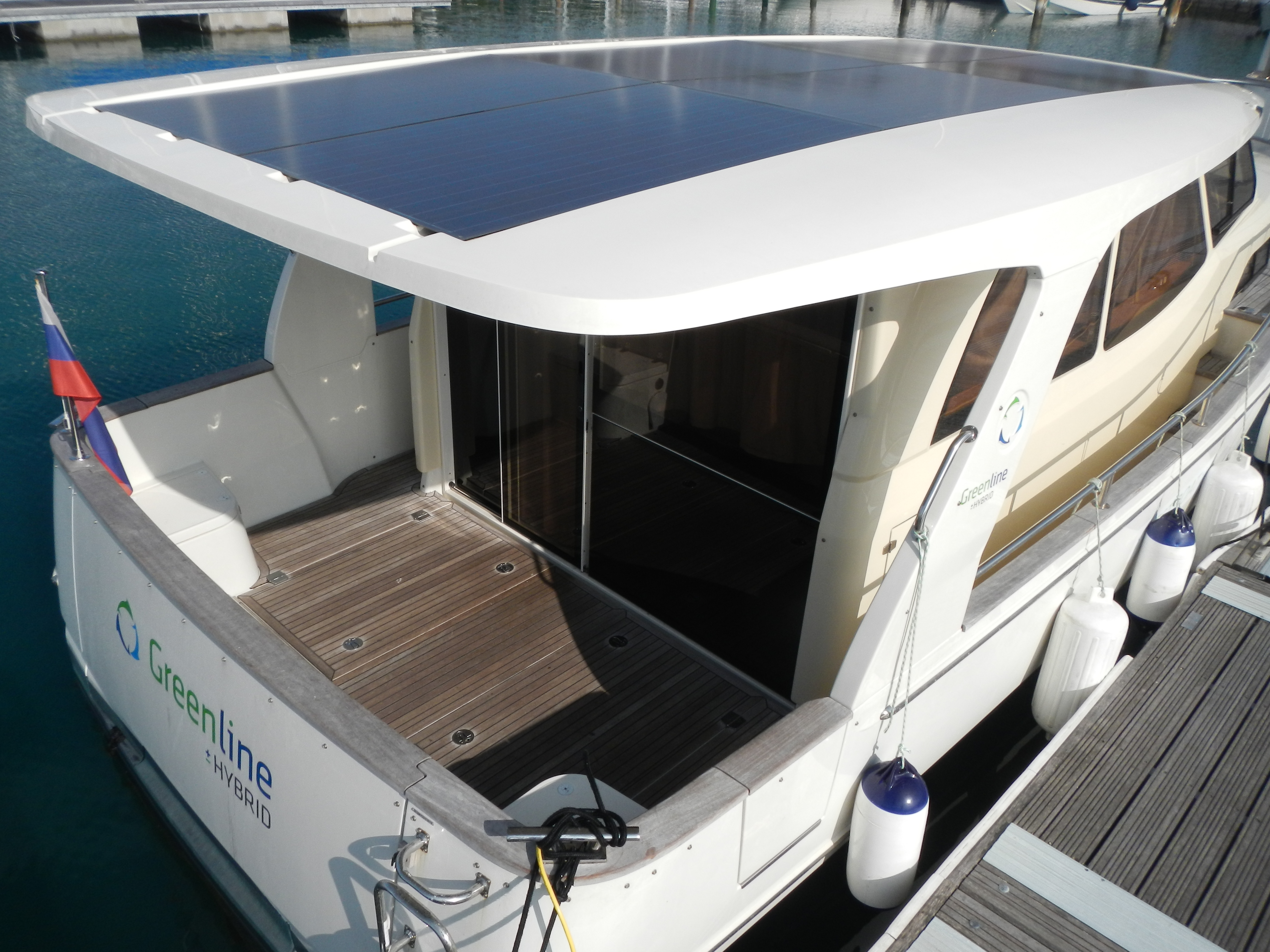
GH 33, stern view with photovoltaic cells on the roof

Hybrid technology was also applied to a Seaway's sailing boat, to the Shipman 59 Carbon, designed together with Doug Peterson and the French naval architect Guillaume Verdier.

In 2014 Seaway was in no shortage of orders for boats, but the enduring credit crunch after the 2008 crisis crippled further production and in 2015 both divisions of the company went out of business.

== J&J Design revived ==
In the meantime Jakopin brothers reestablished J&J Design as an independent company while the boatbuilding part of Seaway (Greenline and Shipman families) was taken over by SVP Yachts (Vladimir Zinchenko). The renewed venture continued to provide design as well as boat engineering and production process engineering for vessels from 20 to 80 feet, to major volume boatbuilders in the power and sailing area, including the Greenline builder SVP Yachts. Until 2024 J&J Design produced over 350 designs from which 75.000 boats were built, by boatbuilders in 30 countries. They won over 110 Boat of the Year, Design or Environmental awards.

During the Boat Builder Awards 2024 event in Amsterdam, organized by RAI Amsterdam and Boat International Media, Japec and Jernej Jakopin, the founders of J&J Design, were awarded the title of "Designer of the Year", as pioneers in carbon epoxy and hybrid power technologies as well as for their influence across a wide part of the boatbuilding industry.

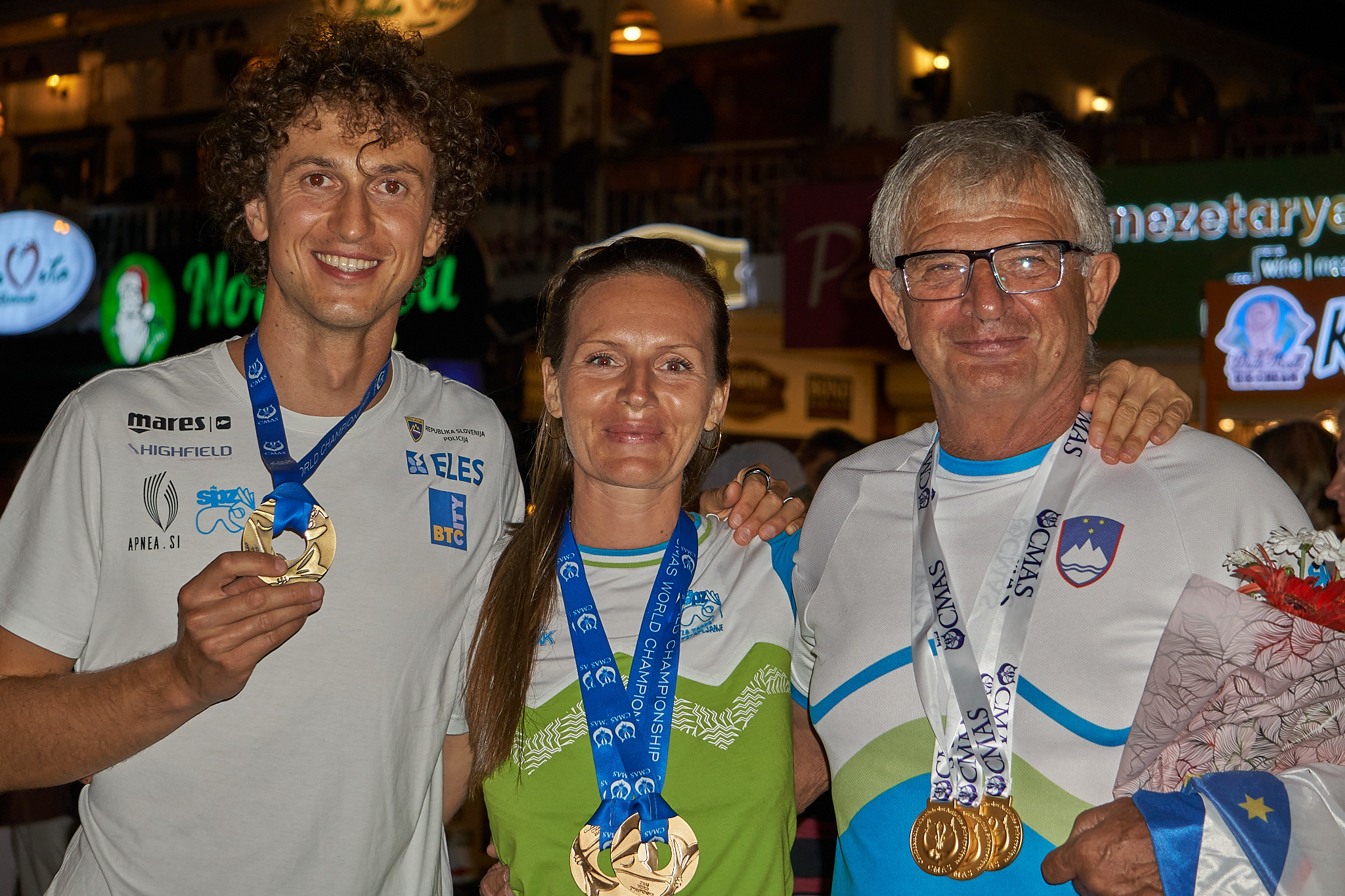
Jeranko, Artnik, Jakopin in Kaş, 2021

== Other activities ==
Jakopin was engaged in promoting new ideas in naval design, especially in the area of hybrid boat propulsion and environment friendly technologies, through lectures, public presentations and work in professional associations such as the Slovenian Academy of Engineering. In October 2021 he won three gold medals in the freediving world championship in Kaş, Turkey in the category over 70 years: in constant weight monofin dive, in free immersion and in constant weight bifin dive. As of 2021 Jakopin held three world records in the above category, in free immersion, bifin and monofin classes.

At the Freediving Indoor World Championship 2022, in June in Belgrade, Serbia he repeated the achievement from Kaş in Masters 70+ category, in Bifins (164 m), Monofin (186 m) and Static apnea (7 minutes 6 seconds) disciplines. In 2022 these results were the world records for the category. In Monofin and Static apnea they were also the best for all groups over 50 years of age.

During the CMAS Finswimming World Masters Championship on June 25 and 26, 2023 in Cairo, Egypt, Jakopin won four gold medals in 70-74 age group: 50 meter surface swimming with monofin (SF), 50 and 100 meter bi-fins (BF), and 50 meter apnoea with monofin (AP). The results achieved in 50 m BF (27.15 s), 100 m BF (1 m 2.78 s) and 50 m AP (21.70 s) were world records for the age group. At the Mediterranea Cup (September 7 to 10 2023) in Cefalu, Italy, he ranked 4th over all age groups in the CWT discipline with a dive to 80 m. Also in 2023, at the CMAS 6th Freediving Outdoor World Cup from October 7 to 15 in Kalamata, Greece, he achieved two world records in the Masters 70+ age group (M5) : constant weight bifin dive (76 m), and constant weight monofin dive (75 m).

At the CMAS Freediving Outdoor World Championship 2024 (October 2nd to 13th) in Kalamata, Greece, Jakopin won gold medals in the 70+ Masters age group in CWT, CWTB and FIM disciplines, and established a CWTB world record for his age group with a dive to 77 m. In 2025, on April 19 he achieved a pool DNF (dynamic no fins) result of 100.5 m at Slovenian national championship in Maribor, and on November 3 43 m in CNF (constant no fins) depth discipline at Egyptian national championship in Dahab; both results were better than world records of the time in the 70+ age group but not ratified by CMAS since they were not achieved at World Championships. In 2025 Jakopin was ranked 98th of the male freedivers, regardless of age, and 3rd Slovenian freediver.

== External References ==
- J&J Design website
- Greenline Hybrid boat site
- Shipman sailing yacht site
