= ETAP 24i =

Sailboat class

Development
- Designer: Marc-Oliver von Ahlen
- Location: Belgium
- Year: 1999
- Builder: ETAP Yachting
- Role: Cruiser
- Name: ETAP 24i

Boat
- Displacement: 4,012 lb (1,820 kg)
- Draft: 4.92 ft (1.50 m)

Hull
- Type: monohull
- Construction: glassfibre
- LOA: 26.31 ft (8.02 m)
- LWL: 22.01 ft (6.71 m)
- Beam: 8.20 ft (2.50 m)
- Engine: Yanmar 9 hp (7 kW) 1GM diesel engine or outboard motor

Hull appendages
- Keel: tandem keels
- Ballast: 1,146 lb (520 kg)
- Rudder: twin transom-mounted rudders

Rig
- Rig type: Bermuda rig

Sails
- Sailplan: fractional rigged sloop
- Total sail area: 327.00 sq ft (30.379 m^{2})

The ETAP 24i is a Belgian trailerable sailboat that was designed by Marc-Oliver von Ahlen as a cruiser and first built in 1999.

== Production ==
The design was built by ETAP Yachting in Belgium starting in 1999, but it is now out of production.

== Design ==
The ETAP 24i is a recreational keelboat, built predominantly of glassfibre, with wood trim. The construction uses a polyester glassfibre and foam sandwich, with provides buoyancy, making the boat unsinkable. It has a fractional sloop rig, a raked stem, a plumb transom, twin transom-hung rudders controlled by a tiller and a fixed fin keel or fixed tandem shoal draft keels. The tandem keel version displaces 4,012 lb (1,820 kg) and carries 1,146 lb (520 kg) of ballast, while the fin keel version displaces 3,964 lb (1,798 kg) and carries 1,101 lb (499 kg) of ballast.

The boat has a draft of 4.92 ft (1.50 m) with the standard fin keel and 2.79 ft (0.85 m) with the optional dual tandem shoal draft keels.

The boat is fitted with a Japanese Yanmar 1GM diesel engine of 9 hp (7 kW) or a small outboard motor for docking and manoeuvring. The fuel tank holds 5 U.S. gallons (19 L; 4.2 imp gal), the fresh water tank has a capacity of 13 U.S. gallons (49 L; 11 imp gal) and the waste tank has a capacity of 11 U.S. gallons (42 L; 9.2 imp gal).

The design has sleeping accommodation for four people, with a double "V"-berth in the bow cabin and two straight settee quarter berths in the main cabin. The galley is located on both sides just aft of the bow cabin. The galley is equipped with a two-burner stove and a sink. A navigation station is opposite the galley, on the starboard side. The head is located just aft of the bow cabin on the port side. Cabin headroom is 67.5 in (171 cm).

For sailing downwind the design may be equipped with a spinnaker.

== Operational history ==
The boat was at one time supported by a class club, the ETAP Owners Association.

A review in Better Sailing stated, "the Etap 24i is the boat that will do whatever you want it to. It is small enough to trail, big enough to cruise for a fortnight, and fast enough to win races, the Etap 24i is as versatile as they come."

Tom Dove wrote in a 2005 review in Sail magazine, "a single-reefed mainsail and full jib were just the right combination for my test sail in 15-plus knots of wind on a choppy Chesapeake Bay. The 24i was never overpowered in these conditions and always felt solid and controllable, whether tacking, gybing, working to windward, or skimming down waves. Boatspeed ranged from 5 knots upwind to 6 knots on a beam reach. The tacking angle was between 85 and 90 degrees ... The tandem keel does have a handling quirk. If you pinch the boat when going to windward, it makes noticeable leeway, but as soon as you fill the sails properly and foot off a bit, it digs in and behaves like a standard fin. The boat’s 3-foot draft would be perfect for the [Florida] Keys or the Bahamas. "

== See also ==
- List of sailing boat types
