= ETAP 22 =

Sailboat class

Development
- Designer: E. G. van de Stadt
- Location: Belgium
- Year: 1974
- No. built: 1830
- Builder: ETAP Yachting
- Name: ETAP 22

Boat
- Displacement: 2,756 lb (1,250 kg)
- Draft: 4.10 ft (1.25 m)

Hull
- Type: monohull
- Construction: glassfibre
- LOA: 21.65 ft (6.60 m)
- LWL: 18.70 ft (5.70 m)
- Beam: 7.87 ft (2.40 m)

Hull appendages
- Keel: lifting keel
- Ballast: 1,213 lb (550 kg)
- Rudder: transom-mounted rudder

Rig
- Rig type: Bermuda rig

Sails
- Sailplan: fractional rigged sloop
- Total sail area: 215.00 sq ft (19.974 m^{2})

The ETAP 22 is a Belgian trailerable sailboat that was designed by E. G. van de Stadt as a cruiser and first built in 1974.

== Production ==
The design was the first boat built by ETAP Yachting in Belgium. It was built between 1974 and 1984, with 1830 boats completed, but it is now out of production.

== Design ==
The ETAP 22 is a recreational keelboat, built predominantly of glassfibre and features a flush deck design. It has a fractional sloop rig, a raked stem, a plumb transom, a transom-hung rudder controlled by a tiller and a lifting keel or optional centreboard. It displaces 2,756 lb (1,250 kg) and carries 1,213 lb (550 kg) of ballast.

The lifting keel equipped model has a draft of 4.10 ft (1.25 m) with the keel fully down, while the centreboard model has a draft of 4.92 ft (1.50 m) with the centreboard extended and 2.3 ft (0.70 m) with it retracted, allowing ground transportation on a trailer.

For downwind sailing the design may be equipped with a spinnaker.

== Operational history ==
The boat was at one time supported by a class club, the ETAP Owners Association.

== See also ==
- List of sailing boat types
