= ETAP 32s =

Sailboat class

Development
- Designer: Mortain & Mavrikios
- Location: Belgium
- Year: 2003
- Builder: ETAP Yachting
- Role: Cruiser
- Name: ETAP 32s

Boat
- Displacement: 8,157 lb (3,700 kg)
- Draft: 5.92 ft (1.80 m)

Hull
- Type: monohull
- Construction: glassfibre
- LOA: 32.25 ft (9.83 m)
- LWL: 27.50 ft (8.38 m)
- Beam: 11.25 ft (3.43 m)
- Engine: Volvo 19 hp (14 kW) diesel engine

Hull appendages
- Keel: wing keel
- Ballast: 2,425 lb (1,100 kg)
- Rudder: internally-mounted spade-type rudder

Rig
- Rig type: Bermuda rig

Sails
- Sailplan: fractional rigged sloop
- Total sail area: 560.00 sq ft (52.026 m^{2})

The ETAP 32s is a Belgian sailboat that was designed by Mortain & Mavrikios as a cruiser and first built in 2003.

The design was named Boat of the Year in 2002 by Cruising World.

== Production ==
The design has been built by ETAP Yachting in Belgium since 2003. It remained advertised as still in production in 2021.

== Design ==
The ETAP 32s is a recreational keelboat, built predominantly of glassfibre, with wood trim. The construction is of a polyester glassfibre and closed-cell polyurethane foam sandwich, which provides buoyancy and makes the boat unsinkable. It has a fractional sloop rig, a raked stem, a reverse transom with steps, an internally mounted spade-type rudder controlled by a vertically mounted tiller and a fixed wing keel or optional twin tandem keels. It displaces 8,157 lb (3,700 kg) and carries 2,425 lb (1,100 kg) of ballast.

The boat has a draft of 5.92 ft (1.80 m) with the standard wing keel and 4.25 ft (1.30 m) with the optional shoal draft tandem keels.

The boat is fitted with a Swedish Volvo diesel engine of 19 hp (14 kW) for docking and manoeuvring. The fuel tank holds 21 U.S. gallons (79 L; 17 imp gal) and the fresh water tank has a capacity of 45 U.S. gallons (170 L; 37 imp gal).

The design has sleeping accommodation for six people, with a double "V"-berth in the bow cabin, two straight settees in the main cabin and an aft cabin with a double berth on the starboard side. The galley is located on the port side just forward of the companionway ladder. The galley is L-shaped and is equipped with a two-burner stove, an ice box and a double sink. A navigation station is opposite the galley, on the starboard side. The head is located aft of the navigation station on the starboard side. Cabin headroom is 74.8 in (190 cm) at the companionway.

== Operational history ==
The boat was at one time supported by a class club, the ETAP Owners Association.

In a 2003 review Cruising World writer Time Murphy describes the vertical tiller system, "the unique helm, called EVS for Etap Vertical Steering, is a tiller that moves athwartships in a vertical plane. The vertical post is attached by Delrin rack-and-pinion gears to the rudderstock. If you're accustomed to steering with a conventional tiller, the motion of this one runs counter to everything you've ever learned: Push the bar left, and the boat steers left. But as each of our judges learned, any confusion ends quickly. 'I really enjoyed steering that boat," said BOTY judge Carol Hasse. "It's quite responsive, and the helm felt balanced.'"

== See also ==
- List of sailing boat types
