= ETAP 30 =

Sailboat class

Development
- Designer: Jacques de Ridder
- Location: Belgium
- Year: 1985
- No. built: 220
- Builder: ETAP Yachting
- Role: Cruiser
- Name: ETAP 30

Boat
- Displacement: 7,940 lb (3,602 kg)
- Draft: 5.90 ft (1.80 m) with the keel down

Hull
- Type: monohull
- Construction: glassfibre
- LOA: 29.60 ft (9.02 m)
- LWL: 25.08 ft (7.64 m)
- Beam: 10.33 ft (3.15 m)
- Engine: Volvo 2002 18 hp (13 kW) diesel engine

Hull appendages
- Keel: fin keel
- Ballast: 3,032 lb (1,375 kg)
- Rudder: internally-mounted spade-type rudder

Rig
- Rig type: Bermuda rig
- I foretriangle height: 33.30 ft (10.15 m)
- J foretriangle base: 11.00 ft (3.35 m)
- P mainsail luff: 36.60 ft (11.16 m)
- E mainsail foot: 12.00 ft (3.66 m)

Sails
- Sailplan: fractional rigged sloop
- Mainsail area: 259 sq ft (24.1 m^{2})
- Jib/genoa area: 289 sq ft (26.8 m^{2})
- Spinnaker area: 593 sq ft (55.1 m^{2})
- Upwind sail area: 549 sq ft (51.0 m^{2})
- Downwind sail area: 852 sq ft (79.2 m^{2})

The ETAP 30 is a Belgian sailboat that was designed by Jacques de Ridder as a cruiser and first built in 1994.

== Production ==
The design was built by ETAP Yachting in Belgium between 1985 and 1994, with 220 boats completed, but it is now out of production.

== Design ==
The ETAP 30 is a recreational keelboat, built predominantly of polyester glassfibre-foam sandwich construction, with wood trim. The use of foam sandwich construction makes the boat unsinkable. It has a 7/8 fractional sloop masthead sloop rig with aluminum spars, a deck-stepped mast, wire standing rigging and a single set of swept spreaders. The hull has a raked stem, a reverse transom, an internally-mounted spade-type rudder controlled by a tiller and a fin keel or optional shoal draft keel. It displaces 7,940 lb (3,602 kg) and carries 3,032 lb (1,375 kg) of cast iron ballast.

The boat has a draft of 5.90 ft (1.80 m) with the standard keel and 4.25 ft (1.30 m) with the optional shoal draft keel.

The boat is fitted with a Volvo 2002 18 hp (13 kW) diesel engine for docking and manoeuvring. The fuel tank has a capacity of 11 U.S. gallons (42 L; 9.2 imp gal).

The design has sleeping accommodation for five people, with a double "V"-berth in the bow cabin, two straight settees in the main cabin, plus an aft berth on starboard side. The galley is located on the port side just forward of the companionway ladder. The L-shaped galley is equipped with a two-burner stove, an 11.4 U.S. gallons (43 L; 9.5 imp gal) capacity icebox and a sink. The head is located just aft of the bow cabin. The fresh water tank has a capacity of 21 U.S. gallons (79 L; 17 imp gal).

For sailing downwind the design may be equipped with a symmetrical spinnaker of 593 sq ft (55.1 m^{2}). It has a hull speed of 6.81 kn (12.61 km/h).

== Operational history ==
The boat was at one time supported by a class club, the ETAP Owners Association.

A 2009 Yachting Monthly review stated, "In many people's view, this was the best yacht Etap produced – and although she lacks an aft cabin, she was far ahead of her time in many other respects, not least her easily-driven hull, designed by Jac de Ridder, which was streets ahead of most other 30ft cruisers when she was launched, in 1983. She handles delightfully on all points of sail and is still a fairly fast cruiser for her length by today’s standards. The hull’s high freeboard is effectively masked by a thick gunwale stripe and the low-profile cabin top gives her an almost racy appearance. Down below she has five sea-berths (or six at anchor), including a quarterberth, and a heads compartment amidships. The galley is spacious and seamanlike, and she has a very practical chart table. Etap's tendency towards short coachroofs means that headroom in the heads and forecabin is restricted but it is fair in other parts of the boat The standard of fit-out is good, with solid teak trim, but stowage, as always with these double-skinned yachts, is limited."

== See also ==
- List of sailing boat types
