= Sun Dance 36 =

Sailboat class

Development
- Designer: Daniel Andrieu; J&J Design
- Location: France
- Year: 1988
- Builder: Jeanneau
- Role: Cruiser

Boat
- Displacement: 11,100 lb (5,035 kg)
- Draft: 6.42 ft (1.96 m)

Hull
- Type: monohull
- Construction: fiberglass
- LOA: 36.16 ft (11.02 m)
- LWL: 30.16 ft (9.19 m)
- Beam: 12.50 ft (3.81 m)
- Engine: Yanmar 27 hp (20 kW) diesel engine

Hull appendages
- Keel: fin keel
- Ballast: 3,774 lb (1,712 kg)
- Rudder: spade-type

Rig
- Rig type: Bermuda rig

Sails
- Sailplan: masthead sloop
- Total sail area: 575.00 sq ft (53.419 m^{2})

The Sun Dance 36 is a French sailboat that was designed by Daniel Andrieu and J&J Design a cruiser and first built in 1988.

The design was developed into the Sun Odyssey 36 in 1990.

== Production ==
The design was built by Jeanneau in France, from 1988 to 1990, but it is now out of production.

== Design ==
The Sun Dance 36 is a recreational keelboat, built predominantly of fiberglass, with wood trim. It has a masthead sloop rig. The hull has a raked stem, a step-equipped reverse transom, an internally mounted spade-type rudder controlled by a wheel and a fixed fin keel or optional shoal draft keel. It displaces 11,100 lb (5,035 kg) and carries 3,774 lb (1,712 kg) of ballast.

The boat has a draft of 6.42 ft (1.96 m) with the standard keel and 4.58 ft (1.40 m) with the optional shoal draft keel.

The boat is fitted with a Japanese Yanmar diesel engine of 27 hp (20 kW) for docking and maneuvering. The fuel tank holds 40 U.S. gallons (150 L; 33 imp gal) and the fresh water tank has a capacity of 98 U.S. gallons (370 L; 82 imp gal).

The design has sleeping accommodation for six people, with a double "V"-berth in the bow cabin, an U-shaped settee around a rectangular table in the main cabin and an two aft cabins, each with a double berth. The galley is located on the port side, admidships and opposite the table. The galley is equipped with a three-burner stove, an ice box and a double sink. A navigation station is aft of the galley, on the port side. There are two heads, one each forward of each aft cabin, plus a sink in the bow cabin on the port side.

The design has a hull speed of 7.36 kn (13.63 km/h).

== Operational history ==
A 1989 Cruising World review reported, "you'll have to see it to believe it. In the Sun Dance 36, Jeanneau has redefined that illusory point at which family cruiser stops and megayacht begins."

== See also ==
- List of sailing boat types
