= ETAP 39s =

Sailboat class

Development
- Designer: J&J Design
- Location: Belgium
- Year: 1998
- Builder: ETAP Yachting
- Role: cruising sailboat
- Name: ETAP 39s

Boat
- Displacement: 14,991 lb (6,800 kg)
- Draft: 6.40 ft (1.95 m)

Hull
- Type: monohull
- Construction: glassfibre
- LOA: 38.98 ft (11.88 m)
- LWL: 33.46 ft (10.20 m)
- Beam: 12.63 ft (3.85 m)
- Engine: Volvo Penta MD-2040s 40 hp (30 kW) diesel engine

Hull appendages
- Keel: fin keel
- Ballast: 4,960 lb (2,250 kg)
- Rudder: internally-mounted spade-type rudder

Rig
- Rig type: Bermuda rig
- I foretriangle height: 43.33 ft (13.21 m)
- J foretriangle base: 12.08 ft (3.68 m)
- P mainsail luff: 46.67 ft (14.23 m)
- E mainsail foot: 16.58 ft (5.05 m)

Sails
- Sailplan: fractional rigged sloop
- Mainsail area: 443 sq ft (41.2 m^{2})
- Jib/genoa area: 392 sq ft (36.4 m^{2})
- Gennaker area: 777 sq ft (72.2 m^{2})
- Other sails: Storm jib: 161 sq ft (15.0 m^{2})
- Upwind sail area: 835 sq ft (77.6 m^{2})
- Downwind sail area: 1,221 sq ft (113.4 m^{2})

The ETAP 39s is a Belgian sailboat that was designed by Slovenian designers J&J Design, as a cruiser and first built in 1998.

== Production ==
The design was built by ETAP Yachting in Belgium from 1998 to 2005, but it is now out of production.

== Design ==
The ETAP 39s is a recreational keelboat, built predominantly of polyester glassfibre-foam cored sandwich, with wood trim. It has a 7/8 fractional sloop rig with aluminum spars, a deck-stepped mast, wire standing rigging and a single set of swept spreaders. The hull has a raked stem, a reverse transom, with boarding steps, an internally mounted spade-type rudder controlled by a wheel and a fixed fin keel or shoal draft keel, both with weighted bulbs. It displaces 14,991 lb (6,800 kg) and carries 4,960 lb (2,250 kg) of lead ballast.

The foam-cored construction renders the boat unsinkable.

The boat has a draft of 6.40 ft (1.95 m) with the standard keel and 4.92 ft (1.50 m) with the optional shoal draft keel.

The boat is fitted with a Swedish Volvo Penta MD-2040s diesel engine of 40 hp (30 kW) for docking and manoeuvring. The fuel tank holds 37 U.S. gallons (140 L; 31 imp gal) and the fresh water tank has a capacity of 92.5 U.S. gallons (350 L; 77.0 imp gal).

The design has sleeping accommodation for eight people, with a double "V"-berth in the bow cabin, a U-shaped settee with a drop-down table that forms a double berth in the main cabin and two aft cabins with a double berth on each side. The galley is located amidships, on the port side. The galley is equipped with a stove, an ice box and a double sink. The head is located aft of the galley, on the port side, just forward of the companionway ladder and has a separate shower stall. The bow cabin is also equipped with a sink. A navigation station is opposite the head, on the starboard side.

For sailing downwind the design may be equipped with an asymmetrical spinnaker of 777 sq ft (72.2 m^{2}). The boat has a hull speed of 7.75 kn (14.35 km/h).

== Operational history ==
The boat was at one time supported by a class club, the ETAP Owners Association.

A 2001 review by Tim Murphy in Cruising World Magazine stated, "the two-cabin version we saw was comfortably laid out ... Boat of the Year judge Carol Hasse liked the aft head, which has a separate shower stall. However, it takes the spot near the companionway traditionally occupied by a U-shaped galley; the 39s's linear galley runs along the port side, an arrangement that none of our judges favored for cooking underway ... There were several details the BOTY judges didn't like. For example, the ports along the cabin top open outward ' onto the working deck. An extruded aluminum toerail, together with outward-angled stanchions, seemed a tripping hazard. Access to engine and through-hulls was tight. Under sail, she's a delight ... On the day we sailed her, she tracked along nicely, exhibiting no tendency to round up. Her balanced rudder felt light in our fingers."

In a 2001 review, naval architect Robert Perry wrote, "the Etap is built with what the brochure calls a "ship in ship" method, i.e., an outer hull and an inner hull with what the company describes as 'polyurethane foam with a minimum of 95-percent closed cells' injected between the two hulls. This increases the displacement of the structure to the point where the boat will not sink, even when holed. There are additional flotation cambers in the bow and the stern. I think what the company is telling us is that this is a liner-built boat with foam injected between the hull and the liner. While the term 'double skinned' may be factually accurate, it may also be misleading. The 'unsinkable' term makes me nervous. It's like tempting fate."

== See also ==
- List of sailing boat types
