= ETAP 30cq =

Sailboat class

Development
- Designer: Marc-Oliver von Ahlen
- Location: Belgium
- Year: 2010
- Builder: ETAP Yachting
- Role: Cruiser
- Name: ETAP 30cq

Boat
- Displacement: 8,157 lb (3,700 kg)
- Draft: 5.75 ft (1.75 m)

Hull
- Type: monohull
- Construction: glassfibre
- LOA: 29.42 ft (8.97 m)
- LWL: 27.75 ft (8.46 m)
- Beam: 11.25 ft (3.43 m)
- Engine: Volvo Penta D1-20 19 hp (14 kW) diesel engine

Hull appendages
- Keel: fin keel with weighted bulb
- Ballast: 2,579 lb (1,170 kg)
- Rudder: internally-mounted spade-type rudder

Rig
- Rig type: Bermuda rig

Sails
- Sailplan: fractional rigged sloop
- Mainsail area: 277 sq ft (25.7 m^{2})
- Jib/genoa area: 161 sq ft (15.0 m^{2})
- Other sails: Genoa: 205 sq ft (19.0 m^{2})
- Total sail area: 438 sq ft (40.7 m^{2})

The ETAP 30cq is a Belgian sailboat that was designed by Marc-Oliver von Ahlen as a cruiser and first built in 2010. The interior was designed by Stile Bertone.

The design replaced the ETAP 28s in the company line in about 2011.

== Production ==
The design has been built by ETAP Yachting in Belgium starting in 2010. It remained advertised as still in production in 2021.

== Design ==
The ETAP 30cq is a recreational keelboat, built predominantly of glassfibre. The construction is of a polyester glassfibre and closed-cell polyurethane foam sandwich, which provides buoyancy and makes the boat unsinkable. It has a 7/8 fractional sloop rig, a plumb stem, a walk-through reverse transom, an internally mounted spade-type rudder controlled by a tiller and a fixed fin keel or optional dual tandem keels. The fin keel version displaces 8,157 lb (3,700 kg) and carries 2,579 lb (1,170 kg) of ballast, while the tandem keel version displaces 8,422 lb (3,820 kg) and carries 2,844 lb (1,290 kg) of ballast.

The boat has a draft of 5.75 ft (1.75 m) with the standard fin keel and 3.58 ft (1.09 m) with the optional shoal draft tandem keels.

The boat is fitted with a Swedish Volvo Penta D1-20 diesel engine of 19 hp (14 kW) for docking and manoeuvring. The fuel tank holds 17 U.S. gallons (64 L; 14 imp gal) and the fresh water tank has a capacity of 30 U.S. gallons (110 L; 25 imp gal).

The design has sleeping accommodation for four people, with a double "V"-berth in the main cabin and an aft cabin with a transversely mounted double berth. The galley is located on the port side just forward of the companionway ladder. The galley is L-shaped and is equipped with a two-burner stove, ice box and a sink. A navigation station is opposite the galley, on the starboard side. The head is located just aft of the navigation station on the starboard side. There is a stowage area in the forepeak. The headroom at the companionway is 76 in (190 cm).

== Operational history ==
The boat was at one time supported by a class club, the ETAP Owners Association.

== See also ==
- List of sailing boat types
