= ETAP 48Ds =

Sailboat class

Development
- Designer: Marc-Oliver von Ahlen
- Location: Belgium
- Year: 2009
- Builder: ETAP Yachting
- Role: Cruiser
- Name: ETAP 48Ds

Boat
- Displacement: 26,350 lb (11,952 kg)
- Draft: 6.73 ft (2.05 m)

Hull
- Type: monohull
- Construction: glassfibre
- LOA: 47.44 ft (14.46 m)
- LWL: 41.01 ft (12.50 m)
- Beam: 14.76 ft (4.50 m)
- Engine: Yanmar 4JH4-TCE 75 hp (56 kW) diesel engine

Hull appendages
- Keel: wing keel
- Ballast: 9,259 lb (4,200 kg)
- Rudder: internally-mounted spade-type rudder

Rig
- Rig type: Bermuda rig
- I foretriangle height: 52.72 ft (16.07 m)
- J foretriangle base: 14.93 ft (4.55 m)
- P mainsail luff: 51.25 ft (15.62 m)
- E mainsail foot: 19.68 ft (6.00 m)

Sails
- Sailplan: fractional rigged sloop
- Mainsail area: 590.40 sq ft (54.850 m^{2})
- Jib/genoa area: 258.33 sq ft (24.000 m^{2})
- Spinnaker area: 1,068.85 sq ft (99.299 m^{2})
- Other sails: genoa 546.81 sq ft (50.800 m^{2}) storm jib 157.15 sq ft (14.600 m^{2})
- Total sail area: 897.85 sq ft (83.413 m^{2})

The ETAP 48Ds is a Belgian sailboat that was designed by Marc-Oliver von Ahlen, with the interior designed by Stile Bertone, as a cruiser and first built in 2009.

The design was originally marketed by the manufacturer as the ETAP 46Ds.

== Production ==
The design has built by ETAP Yachting in Belgium since 2009. It remained advertised as still in production in 2021.

== Design ==
The ETAP 48Ds is a recreational keelboat, built predominantly of glassfibre. The construction is of a polyester glassfibre and closed-cell polyurethane foam sandwich, which provides buoyancy and makes the boat unsinkable. It has a fractional sloop rig, a raked stem, a reverse transom an internally mounted spade-type rudder controlled by a wheel and a fixed fin keel or shoal draft tandem keels. The fin keel version displaces 26,350 lb (11,952 kg) and carries 8,490 lb (3,851 kg) of ballast, while the tandem keel version displaces 27,100 lb (12,292 kg) and carries 9,260 lb (4,200 kg) of ballast.

The boat has a draft of 6.73 ft (2.05 m) with the standard keel and 5.09 ft (1.55 m) with the optional shoal draft tandem keels.

The boat is fitted with a Japanese Yanmar 4JH4-TCE 75 hp (56 kW) diesel engine for docking and manoeuvring. The fuel tank holds 74 U.S. gallons (280 L; 62 imp gal) and the fresh water tank has a capacity of 111 U.S. gallons (420 L; 92 imp gal).

The design has sleeping accommodation for four people, with a double berth in the bow cabin and another in the aft cabin. The galley is located on the port side just forward of the companionway ladder. The galley is L-shaped and is equipped with a two-burner stove, a refrigerator and double sinks. There are two heads, one just aft of the bow cabin on the starboard side and one on the port side forward of the aft cabin. The main salon has a U-shaped settee around a table and a second table opposite.

For sailing downwind the design may be equipped with an gennaker of 1,068.85 sq ft (99.299 m^{2}).

The design has a hull speed of 8.58 kn (15.89 km/h).

== Operational history ==
The boat was at one time supported by a class club, the ETAP Owners Association.

== See also ==
- List of sailing boat types
