= ETAP 28s =

Sailboat class

Development
- Designer: Marc-Oliver von Ahlen and Stile Bertone
- Location: Belgium
- Year: 2007
- Builder: ETAP Yachting
- Role: Cruiser
- Name: ETAP 28s

Boat
- Displacement: 8,157 lb (3,700 kg)
- Draft: 5.75 ft (1.75 m)

Hull
- Type: monohull
- Construction: glassfibre
- LOA: 28.25 ft (8.61 m)
- LWL: 27.75 ft (8.46 m)
- Beam: 11.25 ft (3.43 m)
- Engine: Volvo Penta D1-20 19 hp (14 kW) diesel engine

Hull appendages
- Keel: fin keel
- Ballast: 2,579 lb (1,170 kg)
- Rudder: internally-mounted spade-type rudder

Rig
- Rig type: Bermuda rig

Sails
- Sailplan: fractional rigged sloop
- Mainsail area: 277.71 sq ft (25.800 m^{2})
- Jib/genoa area: 161.46 sq ft (15.000 m^{2})
- Other sails: genoa: 204.51 sq ft (19.000 m^{2})
- Total sail area: 438 sq ft (40.7 m^{2})

The ETAP 28s is a Belgian sailboat that was designed by Marc-Oliver von Ahlen, with the interior designed by Stile Bertone, as a cruiser and first built in 2007.

The ETAP 28s was replaced in the company line by the ETAP 30cq in about 2011.

== Production ==
The design was built by ETAP Yachting in Belgium between 2007 and 2011, but it is now out of production.

== Design ==
The ETAP 28s is a recreational keelboat, built predominantly of glassfibre, with wood trim. The construction is of a polyester glassfibre and closed-cell polyurethane foam sandwich, which provides buoyancy and makes the boat unsinkable. It has a 7/8 fractional sloop rig with a deck-stepped mast, a plumb stem, a walk-through reverse transom, an internally mounted spade-type rudder controlled by a tiller and a fixed fin keel or shoal draft keel. The fin keel version displaces 8,157 lb (3,700 kg) and carries 2,579 lb (1,170 kg) of ballast, while the shoal draft version displaces 8,421 lb (3,820 kg) and carries 2,843 lb (1,290 kg) of ballast.

The boat has a draft of 5.75 ft (1.75 m) with the standard fin keel and 3.16 ft (0.96 m) with the optional shoal draft keel.

The boat is fitted with a Swedish Volvo Penta D1-20 19 hp (14 kW) diesel engine for docking and manoeuvring. The fuel tank holds 17 U.S. gallons (64 L; 14 imp gal) and the fresh water tank has a capacity of 30 U.S. gallons (110 L; 25 imp gal).

The design has sleeping accommodation for four people, with a double "V"-berth in the main cabin and an aft cabin with a double berth mounted transversely. There is a stowage area in the forepeak. The galley is located on the port side just forward of the companionway ladder. The galley is L-shaped and is equipped with a two-burner stove, an icebox and a sink. A navigation station is opposite the galley, on the starboard side. The head is located just aft of the navigation station on the starboard side.

== Operational history ==
The boat was at one time supported by a class club, the ETAP Owners Association.

In a 2007 review in Sailing magazine, naval architect Robert Perry wrote, "it's amazing what you can do in 28 feet, 2 inches today. Italian designer Stile Bertone created this interior. I can almost see this little 28-footer being a comfortable liveaboard boat for a single, compact lifestyle fellow or gal. There is a large double berth aft, a compact but reasonable galley to port and a wide, open saloon. The settee extends forward of the forward bulkhead. I'm not sure what the idea is there unless it's to provide short berths for short kids. It's a clever layout done in attractive light wood veneer with stainless steel pipe rail accents. I'm not sure how easy it would be for me to squeeze myself into that aft berth and it makes me chuckle (stop that!) to think of the person sleeping aft having to get out during the night."

In a 2008 review in Practical Sailing, Darrell Nicholson wrote, "with a displacement of 8,400 pounds, the Etap 28s is a stocky pocket cruiser. In addition to offering the fail-safe of positive buoyancy, she sports a spacious cabin for her size, along with a no-nonsense sail plan that makes it an easy boat to sail. However, there's no free lunch, and the extra beam, weight, and volume needed to add space for flotation results in a 28-footer with nearly 11 feet maximum beam. This adds to the skin drag and makes the addition of light-air sails a welcome option."

In a Cruising World 2008 review Herb McCormick wrote, "we sailed the Etap on a day in which the breeze never topped 5 knots, and we couldn't begin to gauge the boat's real potential. The 28s would clearly be a lot of fun to drive and easily handled by a solo sailor or a couple. But its high boom, small headsail, and short rig-while no doubt ideal in the windy North Sea and other high-latitude destinations-suggests that it might be underpowered in such light-air venues as the Chesapeake. An overlapping genoa is an option we'd suggest for sailors who cover waters with low-to-moderate breeze."

== See also ==
- List of sailing boat types
