= Sun Odyssey 36 =

Sailboat class

Development
- Designer: Daniel Andrieu; J&J Design
- Location: France
- Year: 1990
- Builder: Jeanneau
- Role: Cruiser
- Name: Sun Odyssey 36

Boat
- Displacement: 12,820 lb (5,815 kg)
- Draft: 6.67 ft (2.03 m)

Hull
- Type: monohull
- Construction: fiberglass
- LOA: 36.09 ft (11.00 m)
- LWL: 30.16 ft (9.19 m)
- Beam: 12.50 ft (3.81 m)
- Engine: Yanmar 3GM 30 hp (22 kW) diesel engine

Hull appendages
- Keel: fin keel
- Ballast: 4,222 lb (1,915 kg)
- Rudder: spade-type rudder

Rig
- Rig type: Bermuda rig
- I foretriangle height: 45.08 ft (13.74 m)
- J foretriangle base: 12.30 ft (3.75 m)
- P mainsail luff: 39.40 ft (12.01 m)
- E mainsail foot: 15.09 ft (4.60 m)

Sails
- Sailplan: masthead sloop
- Mainsail area: 323 sq ft (30.0 m^{2})
- Jib/genoa area: 431 sq ft (40.0 m^{2})
- Spinnaker area: 1,076 sq ft (100.0 m^{2})
- Upwind sail area: 753 sq ft (70.0 m^{2})
- Downwind sail area: 1,399 sq ft (130.0 m^{2})

The Sun Odyssey 36 is a French sailboat that was designed by Daniel Andrieu and J&J Design as a cruiser and first built in 1990.

The Sun Odyssey 36 is a development of the 1988 Sun Dance 36.

== Production ==
The design was built by Jeanneau in France, from 1990 to 1992, but it is now out of production.

== Design ==
The Sun Odyssey 36 is a recreational keelboat, built predominantly of fiberglass, with wood trim. The Hull is made from solid polyester fiberglass, with Kevlar reinforcement, while the deck is of balsa and polyester fiberglass sandwich construction. It has a masthead sloop rig, with a deck-stepped mast, two sets of swept spreaders and aluminum spars with discontinuous stainless steel wire rigging. The hull has a raked stem, a reverse transom with steps and a swim platform, an internally mounted spade-type rudder controlled by a wheel and a fixed fin keel or optional shoal-draft keel. The fin keel model displaces 12,820 lb (5,815 kg) and carries 4,222 lb (1,915 kg) of cast iron ballast, while the shoal-draft version displaces 12,566 lb (5,700 kg) and carries 3,968 lb (1,800 kg) of cast iron ballast.

The boat has a draft of 6.67 ft (2.03 m) with the standard keel and 4.83 ft (1.47 m) with the optional shoal draft keel.

The boat is fitted with a Japanese Yanmar 3GM diesel engine of 30 hp (22 kW) for docking and maneuvering. The fuel tank holds 40 U.S. gallons (150 L; 33 imp gal) and the fresh water tank has a capacity of 80 U.S. gallons (300 L; 67 imp gal).

The design has sleeping accommodation for six people, with a double "V"-berth in the bow cabin, an open O-shaped settee around an octagonal table on the starboard side and two aft cabins, each with a double berth. The galley is located on the port side, amidships opposite the salon table. The galley is equipped with a two-burner stove, an ice box and a double sink. A navigation station is aft of the galley, on the port side. There are two heads, one each just forward of the aft cabins, plus a sink in the bow cabin. Cabin maximum headroom is 74 in (188 cm).

For sailing downwind the design may be equipped with a symmetrical spinnaker of 1,076 sq ft (100.0 m^{2}).

The design has a hull speed of 7.36 kn (13.63 km/h).

== See also ==
- List of sailing boat types
