= Sun Way 21 =

1990s French recreational keelboat

Development
- Designer: J&J Design
- Location: France
- Year: 1989
- No. built: 532
- Builder: Jeanneau
- Role: Cruiser

Boat
- Displacement: 1,874 lb (850 kg)
- Draft: 2.46 ft (0.75 m)

Hull
- Type: monohull
- Construction: fiberglass
- LOA: 21.33 ft (6.50 m)
- LWL: 17.88 ft (5.45 m)
- Beam: 8.17 ft (2.49 m)
- Engine: outboard motor

Hull appendages
- Keel: fin keel
- Ballast: 507 lb (230 kg)
- Rudder: spade-type rudder

Rig
- Rig type: Bermuda rig
- I foretriangle height: 22.96 ft (7.00 m)
- J foretriangle base: 7.38 ft (2.25 m)
- P mainsail luff: 24.93 ft (7.60 m)
- E mainsail foot: 8.86 ft (2.70 m)

Sails
- Sailplan: fractional rigged sloop
- Mainsail area: 129 sq ft (12.0 m^{2})
- Jib/genoa area: 118 sq ft (11.0 m^{2})
- Spinnaker area: 269 sq ft (25.0 m^{2})
- Upwind sail area: 248 sq ft (23.0 m^{2})
- Downwind sail area: 398 sq ft (37.0 m^{2})

The Sun Way 21 is a recreational keelboat built by Jeanneau in France from 1989 to 1995, with 532 boats completed.

Built predominantly of polyester fiberglass, with wood trim, the hull is solid fiberglass, while the deck has a balsa core. There is also injected foam that makes the boat unsinkable. The hull has a raked stem, a walk-through reverse transom, an internally mounted spade-type rudder controlled by a tiller and a fixed fin keel or optional stub keel and steel centerboard, with a folding rudder. The fin keel model displaces 1,874 lb (850 kg) and carries 507 lb (230 kg) of cast iron ballast, while the centerboard version displaces 1,852 lb (840 kg) and carries 441 lb (200 kg) of cast iron external ballast. The keel-equipped version of the boat has a draft of 2.46 ft (0.75 m), while the centerboard-equipped version has a draft of 4.27 ft (1.30 m) with the centerboard extended and 2.13 ft (0.65 m) with it retracted. It has a hull speed of 5.67 kn (10.50 km/h).

It has four berths, with a double V-berth and two settees in the main cabin around a table. Cabin headroom is 58 in (147 cm).

It has a 7/8 fractional sloop rig, with a deck-stepped pivoting mast, one set of swept spreaders and aluminum spars with continuous stainless steel wire rigging. For sailing downwind the design may be equipped with a symmetrical spinnaker of 269 sq ft (25.0 m^{2}).
