= ETAP 28i =

Sailboat class

Development
- Designer: Harlé-Mortain
- Location: Belgium
- Year: 1988
- No. built: about 450
- Builder: ETAP Yachting
- Role: cruising sailboat
- Name: ETAP 28i

Boat
- Displacement: 6,173 lb (2,800 kg)
- Draft: 5.00 ft (1.52 m)

Hull
- Type: monohull
- Construction: glassfibre
- LOA: 27.99 ft (8.53 m)
- LWL: 23.79 ft (7.25 m)
- Beam: 10.25 ft (3.12 m)
- Engine: Volvo 2002 18 hp (13 kW) diesel engine

Hull appendages
- Keel: fin keel
- Ballast: 1,808 lb (820 kg)
- Rudder: internally-mounted spade-type rudder

Rig
- Rig type: Bermuda rig
- I foretriangle height: 32.48 ft (9.90 m)
- J foretriangle base: 9.65 ft (2.94 m)
- P mainsail luff: 35.27 ft (10.75 m)
- E mainsail foot: 11.42 ft (3.48 m)

Sails
- Sailplan: fractional rigged sloop
- Mainsail area: 221 sq ft (20.5 m^{2})
- Jib/genoa area: 165 sq ft (15.3 m^{2})
- Spinnaker area: 593 sq ft (55.1 m^{2})
- Other sails: Genoa: 248 sq ft (23.0 m^{2})
- Upwind sail area: 469 sq ft (43.6 m^{2})
- Downwind sail area: 815 sq ft (75.7 m^{2})

The ETAP 28i is a Belgian sailboat that was designed by French designers Philippe Harlé and Alain Mortain (Harlé-Mortain), as a cruiser and first built in 1988.

== Production ==
The design was built by ETAP Yachting in Belgium from 1988 to 1997 with about 450 boats completed, but it is now out of production.

== Design ==
The ETAP 28i is a recreational keelboat, built predominantly of polyester glassfibre-foam cored sandwich, with wood trim. It has a 7/8 fractional sloop rig with aluminum spars, a deck-stepped mast, wire standing rigging and a single set of swept spreaders. The hull has a raked stem, a reverse transom, an internally mounted spade-type rudder controlled by a tiller and a fixed fin keel, with a lifting keel optional. It displaces 6,173 lb (2,800 kg) and carries 1,808 lb (820 kg) of cast iron ballast.

The foam-cored construction renders the boat unsinkable.

The boat has a draft of 5.00 ft (1.52 m) with the standard keel.

The boat is fitted with a Swedish Volvo 2002 diesel engine of 18 hp (13 kW) for docking and manoeuvring. The fuel tank holds 13 U.S. gallons (49 L; 11 imp gal) and the fresh water tank has a capacity of 21 U.S. gallons (79 L; 17 imp gal).

The design has sleeping accommodation for six people, with a double "V"-berth in the bow cabin, two straight settee quarter berths in the main cabin and an aft cabin with a double berth on the port side. The galley is located on the port side just forward of the companionway ladder. The galley is L-shaped and is equipped with a two-burner stove, an ice box and a sink. The head is located just forward of the aft cabin on the starboard side and includes a hanging locker.

For sailing downwind the design may be equipped with a symmetrical spinnaker of 593 sq ft (55.1 m^{2}). It has a hull speed of 6.62 kn (12.26 km/h).

== Operational history ==
The boat was at one time supported by a class club, the ETAP Owners Association.

In a 2009 Yachting Monthly review stated, "with a generously roached, fully-battened mainsail and working jib set on a sporty, 7/8 fractional rig and a fixed, deep-fin keel, she is a sharp performer, enjoyable to sail, good for short-handed cruising and ideal for a couple with two children. Some buyers opted for a lifting keel, which slightly blunts her performance but she still sails well. The main cabin and forepeak are open-plan, under a semi-flush deck, with good headroom up to the forecabin, which is curtained off from the saloon. There is a large aft cabin, a good galley, a spacious heads abaft the companionway and a reasonable chart table."

== See also ==
- List of sailing boat types
