= ETAP 30i =

Sailboat class

Development
- Designer: Mortain & Mavrikios
- Location: Belgium
- Year: 1995
- No. built: 280
- Builder: ETAP Yachting
- Role: cruising sailboat
- Name: ETAP 30i

Boat
- Displacement: 7,715 lb (3,499 kg)
- Draft: 5.58 ft (1.70 m)

Hull
- Type: monohull
- Construction: glassfibre
- LOA: 29.33 ft (8.94 m)
- LWL: 26.25 ft (8.00 m)
- Beam: 10.38 ft (3.16 m)
- Engine: Volvo 18 hp (13 kW) diesel engine

Hull appendages
- Keel: fin keel
- Ballast: 2,425 lb (1,100 kg)
- Rudder: internally-mounted spade-type rudder

Rig
- Rig type: Bermuda rig
- I foretriangle height: 33.50 ft (10.21 m)
- J foretriangle base: 9.55 ft (2.91 m)
- P mainsail luff: 35.63 ft (10.86 m)
- E mainsail foot: 12.47 ft (3.80 m)

Sails
- Sailplan: fractional rigged sloop
- Mainsail area: 262 sq ft (24.3 m^{2})
- Jib/genoa area: 137 sq ft (12.7 m^{2})
- Spinnaker area: 511 sq ft (47.5 m^{2})
- Other sails: Genoa: 175 sq ft (16.3 m^{2})
- Upwind sail area: 437 sq ft (40.6 m^{2})
- Downwind sail area: 772 sq ft (71.7 m^{2})

The ETAP 30i is a Belgian sailboat that was designed by French designers Mortain & Mavrikios, as a cruiser and first built in 1995.

== Production ==
The design was built by ETAP Yachting in Belgium from 1995 to 2005 with 280 boats completed, but it is now out of production.

== Design ==
The ETAP 30i is a recreational keelboat, built predominantly of polyester glassfibre-foam cored sandwich, with wood trim. It has a 7/8 fractional sloop rig with aluminum spars, a deck-stepped mast, wire standing rigging and a single set of swept spreaders. The hull has a raked stem, a walk-through reverse transom, an internally mounted spade-type rudder controlled by a tiller and a fixed fin, weighted bulb keel. It displaces 7,715 lb (3,499 kg) and carries 2,450 lb (1,111 kg) of cast iron ballast.

The foam-cored construction renders the boat unsinkable.

The boat has a draft of 5.58 ft (1.70 m) with the standard keel.

The boat is fitted with a Swedish Volvo diesel engine of 18 hp (13 kW) for docking and manoeuvring. The fuel tank holds 12.9 U.S. gallons (49 L; 10.7 imp gal).

The design has sleeping accommodation for six people, with a double "V"-berth in the bow cabin, two straight settee quarter berths in the main cabin and an aft cabin with a double berth on the port side. The galley is located on the port side just forward of the companionway ladder. The galley is L-shaped and is equipped with a two-burner stove, a 17.2 U.S. gallons (65 L; 14.3 imp gal) ice box and a sink. The head is located opposite the galley, on the starboard side and includes a hanging locker. The fresh water tank has a capacity of 34.3 U.S. gallons (130 L; 28.6 imp gal).

For sailing downwind the design may be equipped with a symmetrical spinnaker of 511 sq ft (47.5 m^{2}). It has a hull speed of 6.87 kn (12.72 km/h).

== Operational history ==
The boat was at one time supported by a class club, the ETAP Owners Association.

In a 2009 Yachting Monthly review stated, "the boat is stiff and sea-kindly under sail, well-suited to short-handed or family cruising, but the standard rig, which features a non-overlapping, self-tacking headsail, leaves her decidedly undercanvassed in light to moderate winds. The bright, cosy saloon – spacious for a 30-footer – has plentiful stowage in lockers along the gunwales, a centrally mounted dining table, a good-sized chart table with plenty of room for instruments, and a workable, L-shaped galley. The heads compartment is surprisingly roomy, with ample hanging space for wet oilskins. The aft cabin has a 6ft by 5ft double berth and the forepeak vee-berth is sealed off from the main cabin with two sliding doors."

== See also ==
- List of sailing boat types
