= ETAP 38i =

Sailboat class

Development
- Designer: Mortain & Mavrikios
- Location: Belgium
- Year: 1989
- No. built: 95
- Builder: ETAP Yachting
- Role: Cruiser

Boat
- Displacement: 14,120 lb (6,405 kg)
- Draft: 5.09 ft (1.55 m)

Hull
- Type: monohull
- Construction: glassfibre
- LOA: 37.96 ft (11.57 m)
- LWL: 31.96 ft (9.74 m)
- Beam: 12.70 ft (3.87 m)
- Engine: Volvo 2003T 40 hp (30 kW) diesel engine

Hull appendages
- Keel: wing keel
- Ballast: 4,850 lb (2,200 kg)
- Rudder: internally-mounted spade-type rudder

Rig
- Rig type: Bermuda rig
- I foretriangle height: 47.08 ft (14.35 m)
- J foretriangle base: 13.45 ft (4.10 m)
- P mainsail luff: 41.83 ft (12.75 m)
- E mainsail foot: 13.48 ft (4.11 m)

Sails
- Sailplan: masthead sloop
- Mainsail area: 281.93 sq ft (26.192 m^{2})
- Jib/genoa area: 316.61 sq ft (29.414 m^{2})
- Total sail area: 598.55 sq ft (55.607 m^{2})

The ETAP 38i is a Belgian sailboat that was designed by Mortain & Mavrikios as a cruiser and first built in 1989.

== Production ==
The design was built by ETAP Yachting in Belgium between 1989 and 1997, with 95 boats completed, but it is now out of production.

== Design ==
The ETAP 38i is a recreational keelboat, built predominantly of glassfibre. It has a masthead sloop rig, a raked stem, a reverse transom with steps, an internally mounted spade-type rudder controlled by a wheel and a fixed wing keel. It displaces 14,120 lb (6,405 kg) and carries 4,850 lb (2,200 kg) of ballast.

The boat has a draft of 5.09 ft (1.55 m) with the standard wing keel.

The boat is fitted with a Swedish Volvo 2003T diesel engine of 40 hp (30 kW) for docking and manoeuvring. The fuel tank holds 32 U.S. gallons (120 L; 27 imp gal) and the fresh water tank has a capacity of 74 U.S. gallons (280 L; 62 imp gal).

The design has sleeping accommodation for six people, with a double "V"-berth in the bow cabin, an L-shaped settee and a straight settee in the main cabin and an aft cabin with a double berth on the port side, around a drop-leaf table. The galley is located on the port side just forward of the companionway ladder. The galley is equipped with a three-burner stove and a sink. A navigation station is opposite the galley, on the starboard side. The head is located opposite the galley on the starboard side.

For sailing downwind the design may be equipped with a spinnaker.

== Operational history ==
The boat was at one time supported by a class club, the ETAP Owners Association.

A 2009 Yachting Monthly review wrote, "the company's flush deck designs work better on larger hulls and this was the largest of its type. She is a striking, sea-kindly Harlé Mortain creation with a robust masthead rig and fully battened mainsail. She performs and handles well on all points of sail, though the low boom can be a hazard. The accommodation is dramatically styled with contrasting light-and-dark stained veneers. Critics would say it is too obviously prefabricated, but supporters call it modern and liken the styling to Ikea. Under the bright wheelhouse, the galley is on one side, the chart table on the other and in the middle is an island unit which contains the sinks and stowage. You drop down a step to the saloon, where you run out of headroom going forward. She has a large heads aft and six berths in three cabins, including a spacious double berth in the aft cabin, a smaller double in the forepeak and two sea-berths in the saloon."

== See also ==
- List of sailing boat types
