= ETAP 37s =

Sailboat class

Development
- Designer: Mortain & Mavrikios
- Location: Belgium
- Year: 2003
- Builder: ETAP Yachting
- Role: Cruiser
- Name: ETAP 37s

Boat
- Displacement: 13,999 lb (6,350 kg)
- Draft: 6.40 ft (1.95 m)

Hull
- Type: monohull
- Construction: glassfibre
- LOA: 36.94 ft (11.26 m)
- LWL: 32.48 ft (9.90 m)
- Beam: 12.63 ft (3.85 m)
- Engine: Volvo diesel engine 28 hp (21 kW)

Hull appendages
- Keel: wing keel
- Ballast: 4,409 lb (2,000 kg)
- Rudder: internally-mounted spade-type rudder

Rig
- Rig type: Bermuda rig

Sails
- Sailplan: fractional rigged sloop
- Mainsail area: 389 sq ft (36.1 m^{2})
- Jib/genoa area: 427 sq ft (39.7 m^{2})
- Gennaker area: 904 sq ft (84.0 m^{2})
- Total sail area: 825 sq ft (76.6 m^{2})

The ETAP 37s is a Belgian sailboat that was designed by Mortain & Mavrikios as a cruiser and first built in 2003.

== Production ==
The design has been built by ETAP Yachting in Belgium since 2003.The Etap 37S remained in production until the shipyard's bankruptcy in 2009..

== Design ==
The ETAP 37s is a recreational keelboat, built predominantly of glassfibre, with wood trim. The construction is of a polyester glassfibre and closed-cell polyurethane foam sandwich, which provides buoyancy and makes the boat unsinkable. It has a 9/10 fractional sloop rig; a raked stem; a raised counter, reverse transom with steps and a swim platform; an internally mounted spade-type rudder controlled by a wheel and a fixed wing keel or optional tandem keels. It displaces 13,999 lb (6,350 kg) and carries 4,409 lb (2,000 kg) of ballast.

The boat has a draft of 6.40 ft (1.95 m) with the standard wing keel and 4.43 ft (1.35 m) with the optional tandem keels.

The boat is fitted with a Swedish Volvo diesel engine of 28 hp (21 kW) for docking and manoeuvring. The fuel tank holds 31 U.S. gallons (120 L; 26 imp gal) and the fresh water tank has a capacity of 66 U.S. gallons (250 L; 55 imp gal).

The design has sleeping accommodation for six people, with a double "V"-berth in the bow cabin, two straight settees in the main cabin and an aft cabin with a double berth on the port side. The galley is located on the port side just forward of the companionway ladder. The galley is equipped with a two-burner stove and double sinks. A navigation station is opposite the galley, on the starboard side. The head is located just aft of the navigation station on the starboard side and includes a shower.

For sailing downwind the design may be equipped with a gennaker of 904 sq ft (84.0 m^{2}).

== Operational history ==
The boat was at one time supported by a class club, the ETAP Owners Association.

In a 2003 review Barry Tranter of Yacht and Boat magazine described the design as "a boat for which seaworthiness was a major design factor, in a manner almost forgotten in the modern cruiser/racer. The hull is extremely well behaved, but you cannot help being impressed by the design detail. The boat gives every promise of being able to handle itself at sea, and the cook should be able to produce hot meals for as long as the crew is capable of eating them."

Darrell Nicholson wrote in a review in Practical Sailor, "the Etap 37 occupies a spot at the high end of the market when measured against most production boats of similar size. However, she is priced competitively compared to quality boats designed for offshore passages. Buyers will pay a premium for her unsinkability. Somers explained that “this construction method adds 20 to 30 percent” to the cost of construction, which raises a question about a) the necessity of an unsinkable boat, or b) the veracity of CE category A. The CE certification (required of all recreational boats sold in the European Union) does not hold offshore cruisers to an unsinkable standard, or require construction methods as stringent as a Lloyd's certification. Most sailors are aware of the risk of going to sea, but assume that a liferaft affords a great degree of protection in the event of a holing. Ultimately, then, a prospective owner may be forced to weigh the risks of an offshore catastrophe with the additional cost of an unsinkable craft. As with any monohull, if the keel falls off it will turtle, though this boat will be more buoyant than a conventionally constructed sailboat."

In a review in Sail magazine, Tom Dove concluded, "Etap has built more than 6,000 unsinkable boats, so this is a proven technology. The boats are comfortable, look sharp, and sail well. The engineering and construction costs a bit more than more conventional techniques and you lose a bit of interior space, but when you're offshore it should be comforting to know that nothing short of cannon fire will do you in."

Tim Murphy described the boat for Cruising World, "Etap Yachting has incorporated many of the Award Winning design features of its 2003 BOTY Award Winner, the Etap 32s, into its newest model in the acclaimed 'S' series from Etap--the new Etap 37s--big sister to the 32s. 'S' stands loosely for 'Sport' in the European vernacular, as in Adventure, and the new Etap 37s represents the series nicely..."

== See also ==
- List of sailing boat types
