= ETAP 22i =

Sailboat class

Development
- Designer: Jacques de Ridder
- Location: Belgium
- Year: 1983
- No. built: 550
- Builder: ETAP Yachting
- Role: Cruiser

Boat
- Displacement: 2,149 lb (975 kg)
- Draft: 4.10 ft (1.25 m) with keel down

Hull
- Type: monohull
- Construction: fibreglass
- LOA: 22.24 ft (6.78 m)
- LWL: 18.04 ft (5.50 m)
- Beam: 8.10 ft (2.47 m)
- Engine: outboard motor

Hull appendages
- Keel: lifting keel
- Ballast: 518 lb (235 kg)
- Rudder: transom-mounted rudder

Rig
- Rig type: Bermuda rig
- I foretriangle height: 21.82 ft (6.65 m)
- J foretriangle base: 7.22 ft (2.20 m)
- P mainsail luff: 24.44 ft (7.45 m)
- E mainsail foot: 8.53 ft (2.60 m)

Sails
- Sailplan: fractional rigged sloop
- Mainsail area: 104.24 sq ft (9.684 m^{2})
- Jib/genoa area: 78.77 sq ft (7.318 m^{2})
- Total sail area: 183.01 sq ft (17.002 m^{2})

The ETAP 22i is a Belgian trailerable sailboat that was designed by Jacques de Ridder as a cruiser and first built in 1983.

== Production ==
The design was built by ETAP Yachting in Malle, Belgium between 1983 and 1996, with 550 boats completed, but it is now out of production.

== Design ==
The ETAP 22i is a recreational keelboat, built predominantly of fibreglass, with wood trim. It has a fractional sloop rig, a raked stem, a plumb transom, a transom-hung rudder controlled by a tiller and a weighted bulb lifting keel. The keel is raised and lowered with a worm gear operated from on deck. It displaces 2,149 lb (975 kg) and carries 518 lb (235 kg) of cast iron ballast.

The boat has closed cell foam sandwich compartments that render it unsinkable.

The boat has a draft of 4.10 ft (1.25 m) with the lifting keel extended and 1.31 ft (0.40 m) with it retracted, allowing operation in shallow water, or ground transportation on a trailer.

The boat is normally fitted with a small 3 to 6 hp (2 to 4 kW) outboard motor for docking and manoeuvring, mounted in a stern well.

The design has sleeping accommodation for four people, with a double "V"-berth in the bow cabin and two straight settee quarter berths in the main cabin along with a drop-leaf table. The galley is located on both sides, just aft of the bow cabin. The galley is equipped with a two-burner stove and a sink. The head is located under the "V"-berth in the bow cabin. Cabin headroom is 54 in (140 cm).

The design has a hull speed of 5.9 kn (10.9 km/h).

== Operational history ==
The boat was at one time supported by a class club, the ETAP Owners Association.

In a 2010 review Steve Henkel wrote, "...this boat was popular with high-end small boaters, but there weren't enough of them willing to pay the relatively high price, which included overseas shipping ... This is an elegant and well-thought-out boat we'd consider buying if we were in the market for something in this size range. She has lots going for her. Best features: She has a very good fit and finish; maximum speed and headroom are at the top of her peer group; and her trailer towing weight is within striking distance of 3,000 pounds. She has niceties like a double hull sandwich with closed-cell polyurethane in the middle, which gives added stiffness and makes her virtually unsinkable. (The double skin also keeps the boat cool in direct sunlight, and warm on cold nights.) Add good-quality hardware including clutches and winches, and an outboard motor well as standard, plus optional "legs" drying out on the hard, and you've got quite a boat. Worst features: Lifting keels are not my favorite configuration. In the 22i's case, all is well as long as the 518-pound cast iron keel slides easily on its nylon guides, and no knocking of the keel against its casing is perceived. If something is heard, the boat may require major fixing."

== See also ==
- List of sailing boat types
