= ETAP Yachting =

Sailboat manufacturer

- Company type: Privately held company
- Industry: Boat building
- Founded: 1970
- Founder: Norbert Joris
- Defunct: 8 November 2010
- Headquarters: Malle, Belgium
- Products: Sailboats; Powerboats
- Parent: MIC Industries
- Website: www.etapyachting.com

ETAP Yachting is a Belgian boat builder based in Malle. The company specializes in the design and manufacture of fibreglass sailboats.

== History ==
The company was founded by Norbert Joris in 1970 and was originally a manufacturer of lighting, aluminium and fibreglass products. ETAP stands for Electro Technical Apparatus.

The first sailboat design produced was the ETAP 22 in 1974, followed by the ETAP 20 in 1975.

The designs have been noted for their use of fibreglass foam sandwich construction, which provides buoyancy, making them unsinkable, while providing rigidity, sound dampening and protection from condensation. The boats also received praise for their high quality of construction and value retention.

In the Great Recession the company was losing money and was purchased by Dehler Yachts in 2008. Dehler Deutschland then declared bankruptcy later in 2008 and in January 2009 ETAP was declared insolvent. The company brand and moulds were purchased by MIC Industries in March 2009 and up until at least 2012 no boats were produced. It was reported that the company had ceased operations in 2012, but in 2021 the company was advertising seven designs, the ETAP 22s, ETAP 26s, ETAP 30cq, ETAP 32s, ETAP 37s, ETAP 48Ds sailboats and the ETAP 1100 AC powerboat.

== Boats ==
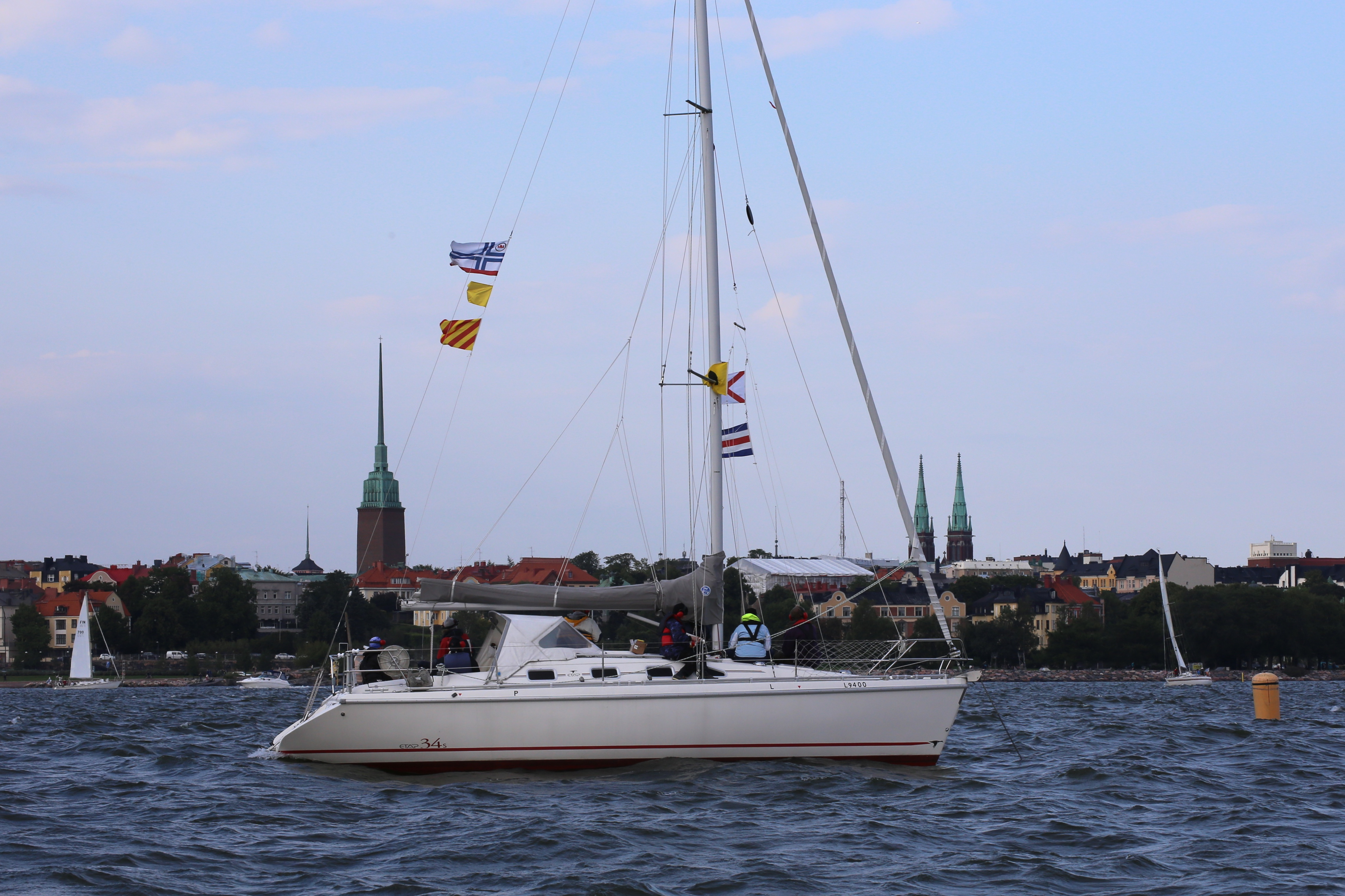
ETAP 34s

Summary of boats built by ETAP Yachting:

- ETAP 22 - 1974
- ETAP 20 - 1975
- ETAP 28 - 1978
- ETAP 23 - 1982
- ETAP 23i - 1982
- ETAP 26 - 1982
- ETAP 22i - 1983
- ETAP 30 - 1985
- ETAP 28i - 1988
- ETAP 38i - 1989
- ETAP 32i - 1992
- ETAP 35i - 1992
- ETAP 23il - 1994
- ETAP 26i - 1994
- ETAP 30i - 1995
- ETAP 21i - 1997
- ETAP 34s - 1997
- ETAP 39s - 1998
- ETAP 24i - 1999
- ETAP 32s - 2003
- ETAP 37s - 2004
- ETAP 26s - 2005
- ETAP 28s - 2007
- ETAP 22s - 2009
- ETAP 48Ds - 2009
- ETAP 30cq - 2010

== See also ==
- List of sailboat designers and manufacturers
