= ETAP 20 =

Sailboat class

Development
- Designer: E. G. van de Stadt
- Location: Belgium
- Year: 1980-1990
- No. built: 1,000
- Builder: ETAP Yachting
- Role: Cruiser
- Name: ETAP 20

Boat
- Displacement: 1,874 lb (850 kg)
- Draft: 3.74 ft (1.14 m) with keel down

Hull
- Type: monohull
- Construction: fibreglass
- LOA: 19.85 ft (6.05 m)
- LWL: 17.06 ft (5.20 m)
- Beam: 7.55 ft (2.30 m)
- Engine: outboard motor

Hull appendages
- Keel: lifting keel
- Ballast: 441 lb (200 kg)
- Rudder: transom-mounted rudder

Rig
- Rig type: Bermuda rig

Sails
- Sailplan: fractional rigged sloop
- Mainsail area: 10.40 m^{2} (111.9 sq ft)
- Jib/genoa area: 7.00 m^{2} (75.3 sq ft)
- Spinnaker area: 22.00 m^{2} (236.8 sq ft)
- Upwind sail area: 17.40 m^{2} (187.3 sq ft)
- Downwind sail area: 32.40 m^{2} (348.8 sq ft)

The ETAP 20 is a Belgian trailerable sailboat that was designed by E. G. van de Stadt as a cruiser and first built in 1975.

== Production ==
The design was built by ETAP Yachting in Lokeren, Belgium between 1975 and 1992, with 1,000 boats completed, but it is now out of production.

== Design ==
The ETAP 20 is a recreational keelboat, built predominantly of fibreglass, with wood trim. It has a fractional sloop rig, a raked stem, a plumb transom, a kick-up transom-hung rudder controlled by a tiller and a weighted bulb lifting keel. The keel is raised and lowered with a worm gear operated from on deck. It displaces 1,874 lb (850 kg) and carries 441 lb (200 kg) of ballast.

The boat has closed cell foam sandwich compartments that render it unsinkable and also will float it level, even when the boat is full of water.

The boat has a draft of 3.74 ft (1.14 m) with the lifting keel extended and 1.57 ft (0.48 m) with it retracted, allowing operation in shallow water, or ground transportation on a trailer.

The boat is normally fitted with a small 3 to 6 hp (2 to 4 kW) outboard motor for docking and manoeuvring.

The design has sleeping accommodation for four people, with a double "V"-berth in the bow cabin and two straight settee quarter berths in the main cabin along with a drop-leaf table. The galley is located on both sides just aft of the bow cabin. The galley is equipped with a single-burner stove and a sink. The head is located under the "V"-berth in the bow cabin. Cabin headroom is 48 in (120 cm).

For downwind sailing the design may be equipped with a spinnaker of 22.00 m^{2} (236.8 sq ft).

The design has a hull speed of 5.5 kn (10.2 km/h).

== Operational history ==
The boat was at one time supported by a class club, the ETAP Owners Association.

In a 2009 review Yachting Monthly described its as, "a stout and safe little 1980s starter boat designed by E G Van de Stadt, the Etap 20 sails nicely and handles rather like a big dinghy. She has a simple, open-plan interior with four berths and reasonable headroom under a raised, semi-flush deck. The lifting keel box takes up remarkably little room, yet she has enough ballast to right herself following a knockdown. There is space for a simple cooker and a chemical toilet stows under the forward bunks. Stowage is somewhat limited. She is easily trailed and can be rigged and launched in half an hour."

In a 2010 review Steve Henkel wrote, "this nicely conceived 20-footer was introduced in Europe in 1980 and in the U.S. in 1985, by Belgian builder ETAP (acronym for Electro Technical Apparatus, a diversified manufacturer of lighting, aluminum, and fiberglass products, which entered the boatbuilding business in 1970). Best features: Like the firm's other small sailboats (including the ETAP 29i and ETAP 23), the ETAP 20 is built to a very high standard, and is unsinkable ... Designated stowage space for sails and outboard engine, and a stowable dining-and-chart table, are nice touches ... The lifting keel with bulb at bottom keeps center of gravity low when lowered and gives easy trailering when raised using self-locking worm drive, operated from on deck. Worst features: None to speak of."

== See also ==
- List of sailing boat types
