= ETAP 21i =

Sailboat class

Development
- Designer: Mortain & Mavrikios
- Location: Belgium
- Year: 1997
- No. built: 549
- Builder: ETAP Yachting
- Name: ETAP 21i

Boat
- Displacement: 2,712 lb (1,230 kg)
- Draft: 2.30 ft (0.70 m)

Hull
- Type: monohull
- Construction: glassfibre
- LOA: 21.52 ft (6.56 m)
- LWL: 20.01 ft (6.10 m)
- Beam: 8.17 ft (2.49 m)
- Engine: outboard motor

Hull appendages
- Keel: tandem keels
- Ballast: 772 lb (350 kg)
- Rudder: transom-mounted rudder

Rig
- Rig type: Bermuda rig

Sails
- Sailplan: fractional rigged sloop
- Total sail area: 257.26 sq ft (23.900 m^{2})

The ETAP 21i is a Belgian trailerable sailboat that was designed by Mortain & Mavrikios as a cruiser and first built in 1997.

The ETAP 21i design was developed into the ETAP 22s after 2009, a design using the same hull, but it was not known if any had been produced by 2021.

== Production ==
The ETAP 21i was built by ETAP Yachting in Belgium between 1997 and 2009, with 549 boats completed, but it is now out of production.

== Design ==
The design is a recreational keelboat, built predominantly of glassfibre, with wood trim. It has a fractional sloop rig; a plumb stem; a vertical transom; twin transom-hung rudders controlled by a tiller and two fixed, shallow draft, tandem keels.

The boat is normally fitted with a small outboard motor for docking and maneuvering.

== Variants ==
ETAP 21i
This model was and produced from 1997 to 2009. It has a length overall of 21.52 ft (6.6 m), a waterline length of 20.01 ft (6.1 m), displaces 2,712 lb (1,230 kg), carries 772 lb (350 kg) of ballast and has a draft of 2.30 ft (0.70 m) with the standard twin tandem keels. It displaces 2,601 lb (1,180 kg), carries 661 lb (300 kg) of ballast and has a draft of 4.25 ft (1.30 m) with the optional fin keel.
ETAP 22s
This model was introduced after 2009 and uses the same hull as the 21i. It has a length overall of 21.5 ft (6.6 m), a waterline length of 20 ft (6.1 m), displaces 2,711 lb (1,230 kg), carries 771 lb (350 kg) of ballast and has a draft of 2.30 ft (0.70 m) with the standard dual tandem keels. It displaces 2,601 lb (1,180 kg), carries 661 lb (300 kg) of ballast and has a draft of 4.25 ft (1.30 m) with the optional fin keel.

== Operational history ==
The boat was at one time supported by a class club, the ETAP Owners Association.

In a 2003 review in Yacht and Boat magazine, Barry Tranter wrote, "as the wind builds she heels initially, then the cast-iron bulb keel stiffens her up. And just when you think you may need to reach for the traveller to ease a bit of pressure you realise that the leeward rudder is biting deep into the water and keeps the boat tracking straight. This is the most memorable aspect of the Etap's behaviour; because the rudders are inclined to the vertical at rest (i.e. their lower tips are canted outwards) the leeward rudder is more or less vertical as the boat heels and it is also pushed deeper into the water as the leeward bilge submerges (and the windward rudder lifts clear.) As a result directional stability is exceptional, vital on short, light hulls, which can get out of sorts when tiller, mainsheet and the skipper's brain get out of phase with sharp gusts and lulls. Handling the Etap is simple ... This is a delightful and refreshing boat to sail..."

== See also ==
- List of sailing boat types
