= ETAP 32i =

Sailboat class

Development
- Designer: Harlé-Mortain
- Location: Belgium
- Year: 1992
- No. built: about 150
- Builder: ETAP Yachting
- Role: cruising sailboat
- Name: ETAP 32i

Boat
- Displacement: 9,763 lb (4,428 kg)
- Draft: 4.60 ft (1.40 m)

Hull
- Type: monohull
- Construction: glassfibre
- LOA: 30.67 ft (9.35 m)
- LWL: 26.25 ft (8.00 m)
- Beam: 11.22 ft (3.42 m)
- Engine: 19 hp (14 kW) diesel engine

Hull appendages
- Keel: fin keel
- Ballast: 2,866 lb (1,300 kg)
- Rudder: internally-mounted spade-type rudder

Rig
- Rig type: Bermuda rig
- I foretriangle height: 38.51 ft (11.74 m)
- J foretriangle base: 11.30 ft (3.44 m)
- P mainsail luff: 38.71 ft (11.80 m)
- E mainsail foot: 12.63 ft (3.85 m)

Sails
- Sailplan: fractional rigged sloop
- Mainsail area: 280 sq ft (26 m^{2})
- Jib/genoa area: 308 sq ft (28.6 m^{2})
- Spinnaker area: 771 sq ft (71.6 m^{2})
- Other sails: Storm jib: 53 sq ft (4.9 m^{2})
- Upwind sail area: 588 sq ft (54.6 m^{2})
- Downwind sail area: 1,051 sq ft (97.6 m^{2})

The ETAP 32i is a Belgian sailboat that was designed by French designers Philippe Harlé and Alain Mortain (Harlé-Mortain), as a cruiser and first built in 1992.

== Production ==
The design was built by ETAP Yachting in Belgium from 1992 to 2000 with about 150 boats completed, but it is now out of production.

== Design ==
The ETAP 32i is a recreational keelboat, built predominantly of polyester glassfibre-foam cored sandwich, with wood trim. It has a 7/8 fractional sloop rig with aluminum spars, a deck-stepped mast, wire standing rigging and a single set of swept spreaders. The hull has a raked stem, a walk-through reverse transom, an internally mounted spade-type rudder controlled by a tiller and a fixed fin keel. It displaces 9,763 lb (4,428 kg) and carries 2,866 lb (1,300 kg) of ballast.

The foam-cored construction renders the boat unsinkable.

The boat has a draft of 4.60 ft (1.40 m) with the standard keel.

The boat is fitted with a diesel engine of 19 hp (14 kW) for docking and manoeuvring. The fuel tank holds 19 U.S. gallons (72 L; 16 imp gal) and the fresh water tank has a capacity of 34.3 U.S. gallons (130 L; 28.6 imp gal).

The design has sleeping accommodation for six people, with a double "V"-berth in the bow cabin, two straight settee quarter berths in the main cabin and an aft cabin with a double berth on the port side. The galley is located on the port side just forward of the companionway ladder. The galley is L-shaped and is equipped with a three-burner stove, a 17.2 U.S. gallons (65 L; 14.3 imp gal) ice box and a double sink. The head is located opposite the galley, on the starboard side and includes a shower. The main cabin has 72 in (183 cm) of headroom.

For sailing downwind the design may be equipped with a symmetrical spinnaker of 771 sq ft (71.6 m^{2}). The boat has a hull speed of 6.87 kn (12.72 km/h).

== Operational history ==
The boat was at one time supported by a class club, the ETAP Owners Association.

In a 2009 Yachting Monthly review stated, "from her short coachroof and acres of flush, TBS-covered decks and her custom deck gear, to her stainless steel and white oak-veneered interior, this Harlé Mortain model from 1993 was strikingly different from her contemporaries. Sales probably suffered as a result, though she was, and is, a very good boat in many ways. Under sail she is responsive and well mannered and capable of maintaining good average speeds. The galley is excellent but the chart table is too small. Headroom in the forward part of the saloon is too low for optimum comfort, but the all-round windows of the doghouse provide wonderful light and panoramic views. She has a large aft cabin and six berths."

== See also ==
- List of sailing boat types
