= ETAP 26s =

26-foot Belgian keelboat

Development
- Designer: Marc-Oliver von Ahlen
- Location: Belgium
- Year: 2005
- Builder: ETAP Yachting
- Role: Cruiser
- Name: ETAP 26s

Boat
- Displacement: 3,964 lb (1,798 kg)
- Draft: 4.92 ft (1.50 m)

Hull
- Type: monohull
- Construction: glassfibre
- LOA: 26.31 ft (8.02 m)
- LWL: 22.01 ft (6.71 m)
- Beam: 8.20 ft (2.50 m)
- Engine: Yanmar diesel engine or outboard motor

Hull appendages
- Keel: fin keel with weighted bulb
- Ballast: 1,101 lb (499 kg)
- Rudder: dual transom-mounted rudders

Rig
- Rig type: Bermuda rig

Sails
- Sailplan: fractional rigged sloop
- Mainsail area: 169 sq ft (15.7 m^{2})
- Jib/genoa area: 131 sq ft (12.2 m^{2})
- Gennaker area: 453 sq ft (42.1 m^{2})
- Total sail area: 327 sq ft (30.4 m^{2})

The ETAP 26s is a Belgian sailboat that was designed by Marc-Oliver von Ahlen as a cruiser and first built in 2005.

The design was Sail magazine's Yacht of the Year in 2017.

== Production ==
The design has been built by ETAP Yachting in Belgium since 2005. It remained advertised as still in production in 2023.

== Design ==
The ETAP 26s is a recreational keelboat, built predominantly of glassfibre, with wood trim. The construction is of a polyester glassfibre and closed-cell polyurethane foam sandwich, which provides buoyancy and makes the boat unsinkable. It has a fractional sloop rig with a bowsprit; a plumb stem; a vertical, walk-through transom; dual, canted, transom-hung rudders controlled by a tiller and a fixed fin keel or optional shoal draft dual keels. The fin keel version displaces 3,964 lb (1,798 kg) and carries 1,101 lb (499 kg) of lead ballast, while the dual keel version displaces 4,008 lb (1,818 kg) and carries 1,145 lb (519 kg) of ballast.

The boat has a draft of 4.92 ft (1.50 m) with the standard fin keel and 2.79 ft (0.85 m) with the optional shoal draft tandem keels.

The boat is fitted with a Japanese Yanmar diesel engine or a small outboard motor for docking and manoeuvring.

The design has sleeping accommodation for four people, with a double "V"-berth in the bow cabin and two straight settees in the main cabin. The galley is located on both sides, just aft of the bow cabin. The galley is equipped with a two-burner stove and a sink. The head is located in the bow cabin on the port side. The fresh water tank has a capacity of 13 U.S. gallons (49 L; 11 imp gal).

== Reception ==
A Xboat review reported, "right from its launch, the ETAP 26s was a trendsetter, with its safe, deep cockpit, the flowing lines of its cabin sofas, the recessed foredeck hatch and much more."

A profile in 2Yachts states, "Etap 26s was ... [a] landmark yacht and a kind of a trendsetter in the field of small cruisers. The yacht immediately after his birth became popular among the sailors due to a combination of several technical solutions. Among them: a deep, safe and well-planned cockpit, comfortable, spacious and well equipped below deck space, the ability to move the yacht on a trailer, the possibility of picking different keel options including a lifting keel and double that facilitate the possibility of walking on shallow waters and giving you the opportunity to pull the boat into the water right off the trailer on the slip, without any crane."
