= ETAP 26i =

Sailboat class

Development
- Designer: Mortain & Mavrikios
- Location: Belgium
- Year: 1994
- Builder: ETAP Yachting
- Role: Cruiser
- Name: ETAP 26i

Boat
- Displacement: 5,071 lb (2,300 kg)
- Draft: 3.77 ft (1.15 m)

Hull
- Type: monohull
- Construction: glassfibre
- LOA: 25.75 ft (7.85 m)
- LWL: 23.46 ft (7.15 m)
- Beam: 9.12 ft (2.78 m)
- Engine: Volvo Penta 2010 diesel engine 10 hp (7 kW)

Hull appendages
- Keel: fin keel
- Ballast: 1,433 lb (650 kg)
- Rudder: internally-mounted spade-type rudder

Rig
- Rig type: Bermuda rig
- I foretriangle height: 27.23 ft (8.30 m)
- J foretriangle base: 7.78 ft (2.37 m)
- P mainsail luff: 31.50 ft (9.60 m)
- E mainsail foot: 10.83 ft (3.30 m)

Sails
- Sailplan: fractional rigged sloop
- Mainsail area: 170.57 sq ft (15.846 m^{2})
- Jib/genoa area: 105.92 sq ft (9.840 m^{2})
- Total sail area: 276.50 sq ft (25.688 m^{2})

The ETAP 26i is a Belgian sailboat that was designed by Mortain & Mavrikios as a cruiser and first built in 1994.

== Production ==
The design was built by ETAP Yachting in Belgium between 1994 and 2006, but it is now out of production.

== Design ==
The ETAP 26i is a recreational keelboat, built predominantly of glassfibre, with wood trim. It has a fractional sloop rig, a plumb stem, a reverse transom with steps, an internally mounted spade-type rudder controlled by a tiller and a fixed fin keel or optional dual tandem keels. It displaces 5,071 lb (2,300 kg) and carries 1,433 lb (650 kg) of iron ballast, with either keel.

The boat has a draft of 3.77 ft (1.15 m) with the standard keel and 2.95 ft (0.90 m) with the optional tandem keels.

The boat is fitted with a Swedish Volvo Penta 2010 10 hp (7 kW) diesel engine with a saildrive, for docking and manoeuvring. The fuel tank holds 49 litres (11 imp gal; 13 US gal).

The design has sleeping accommodation for four people, with a double "V"-berth in the bow cabin and an aft cabin with a double berth on the port side. The galley is located on the port side just forward of the companionway ladder. The galley is L-shaped and is equipped with a two-burner stove, an ice box and a sink. A navigation station is opposite the galley, on the starboard side. The head is located opposite the galley, on the starboard side, aft of the navigation station.

For sailing downwind the design may be equipped with an asymmetrical spinnaker.

== Operational history ==
The boat was at one time supported by a class club, the ETAP Owners Association.

== See also ==
- List of sailing boat types
