= ETAP 35i =

Sailboat class

Development
- Location: Belgium
- Year: 1992
- Builder: ETAP Yachting
- Role: Cruiser

Boat
- Displacement: 11,464 lb (5,200 kg)
- Draft: 5.09 ft (1.55 m)

Hull
- Type: monohull
- Construction: glassfibre
- LOA: 34.84 ft (10.62 m)
- LWL: 29.00 ft (8.84 m)
- Beam: 11.52 ft (3.51 m)
- Engine: Volvo Penta 28 hp (21 kW) diesel engine

Hull appendages
- Keel: fin keel
- Ballast: 3,836 lb (1,740 kg)
- Rudder: internally-mounted spade-type rudder

Rig
- Rig type: Bermuda rig
- I foretriangle height: 39.37 ft (12.00 m)
- J foretriangle base: 11.81 ft (3.60 m)
- P mainsail luff: 40.85 ft (12.45 m)
- E mainsail foot: 13.29 ft (4.05 m)

Sails
- Sailplan: fractional rigged sloop
- Mainsail area: 271.45 sq ft (25.219 m^{2})
- Jib/genoa area: 232.48 sq ft (21.598 m^{2})
- Total sail area: 503.93 sq ft (46.817 m^{2})

The ETAP 35i is a Belgian sailboat that was designed as a cruiser and first built in 1992.

== Production ==
The design was built by ETAP Yachting in Belgium starting in 1992, but it is now out of production.

== Design ==
The ETAP 35i is a recreational keelboat, built predominantly of glassfibre, with wood trim. It is made from a polyester glassfibre foam sandwich that makes the boat unsinkable. It has a fractional sloop masthead sloop rig, a raked stem, a reverse transom with boarding steps, an internally mounted spade-type rudder controlled by a wheel and a fixed fin keel. It displaces 11,464 lb (5,200 kg) and carries 3,836 lb (1,740 kg) of ballast.

The boat has a draft of 5.09 ft (1.55 m) with the standard keel.

The boat is fitted with a Swedish Volvo Penta diesel engine of 28 hp (21 kW) for docking and manoeuvring. The fuel tank holds 28 U.S. gallons (110 L; 23 imp gal) and the fresh water tank has a capacity of 74 U.S. gallons (280 L; 62 imp gal).

The design has sleeping accommodation for six people, with a double "V"-berth in the bow cabin, two straight settees in the main cabin and a small aft cabin with a double berth on the port side. The galley is located on the port side just forward of the companionway ladder. The galley is L-shaped and is equipped with a three-burner stove and a double sink. A navigation station is opposite the galley, on the starboard side. The head is located just aft of navigation station on the starboard side and includes a shower. The bow cabin also has a sink.

For sailing downwind the design may be equipped with a spinnaker.

== Operational history ==
The boat was at one time supported by a class club, the ETAP Owners Association.

In a 2010 review in Yachting Monthly Dick Durham wrote, "An excellent cruising boat – fast, seaworthy, thoughtfully designed and very reasonably priced considering the high quality of build. Etaps also tend to hold their value well on the second-hand market. The unsinkability factor and double-skin construction is a reassuring bonus, offering soundproofing, thermal insulation and eradicating condensation. One fly in the ointment is the optimistic addition of the aft ‘cabin’. I believe that very few yachts under 40 ft LOA should have one, and on this boat it's no more than a giant locker."

== See also ==
- List of sailing boat types
