= ETAP 23iL =

Sailboat class

Development
- Designer: Jacques de Ridder
- Location: Belgium
- Year: 1994
- No. built: 110
- Builder: ETAP Yachting
- Role: Cruiser
- Name: ETAP 23iL

Boat
- Displacement: 3,420 lb (1,551 kg)
- Draft: 4.82 ft (1.47 m) with the keel down

Hull
- Type: monohull
- Construction: glassfibre
- LOA: 25.50 ft (7.77 m)
- LWL: 20.31 ft (6.19 m)
- Beam: 8.18 ft (2.49 m)
- Engine: outboard motor

Hull appendages
- Keel: lifting keel
- Ballast: 1,035 lb (469 kg)
- Rudder: transom-mounted rudder

Rig
- Rig type: Bermuda rig
- I foretriangle height: 23.80 ft (7.25 m)
- J foretriangle base: 8.10 ft (2.47 m)
- P mainsail luff: 26.12 ft (7.96 m)
- E mainsail foot: 9.00 ft (2.74 m)

Sails
- Sailplan: fractional rigged sloop
- Mainsail area: 151 sq ft (14.0 m^{2})
- Jib/genoa area: 62 sq ft (5.8 m^{2})
- Gennaker area: 295 sq ft (27.4 m^{2})
- Other sails: Genoa: 160 sq ft (15 m^{2}); Solent: 110 sq ft (10 m^{2}); Storm jib: 28 sq ft (2.6 m^{2})
- Upwind sail area: 311 sq ft (28.9 m^{2})
- Downwind sail area: 446 sq ft (41.4 m^{2})

The ETAP 23iL is a Belgian trailerable sailboat that was designed by Jacques de Ridder as a cruiser and first built in 1994.

== Production ==
The design was built by ETAP Yachting in Belgium between 1994 and 1999, with 100 boats completed, but it is now out of production.

== Design ==
The ETAP 23iL is a recreational keelboat, built predominantly of polyester glassfibre-foam sandwich construction, with wood trim. The use of foam sandwich construction makes the boat unsinkable. It has a 7/8 fractional sloop masthead sloop rig with aluminum spars, a deck-stepped mast, wire standing rigging and a single set of swept spreaders. The hull has a slightly raked stem, a plumb transom, a transom-hung rudder controlled by a tiller and a lifting keel with a weighted bulb. It displaces 3,420 lb (1,551 kg) and carries 1,035 lb (469 kg) of cast iron ballast.

The boat has a draft of 4.82 ft (1.47 m) with the lifting extended and 2.30 ft (0.70 m) with it retracted, allowing beaching or ground transportation on a trailer.

The boat is normally fitted with a small 6 to 9 hp (4 to 7 kW) outboard motor for docking and manoeuvring.

The design has sleeping accommodation for four people, with a double "V"-berth in the bow cabin and two straight settees in the main cabin. The galley is located on the port side just aft of the bow cabin. The galley is equipped with a two-burner stove, an icebox and a sink. The head is located in the bow cabin on the port side, under the "V"-berth. The fresh water tank has a capacity of 13.2 U.S. gallons (50 L; 11.0 imp gal)

For sailing downwind the design may be equipped with an asymmetrical spinnaker of 295 sq ft (27.4 m^{2}). It has a hull speed of 6.04 kn (11.19 km/h).

== Operational history ==
The boat was at one time supported by a class club, the ETAP Owners Association.

A review in Boat Specs, notes "the Lifting keel version features an appendage configuration without compromise between draft and performance. Only drawback: some space is taken inside by the keel."

A review in the Yacht Charter Guide described the design, "the ETAP 23iL is a very safe, fast seagoing yacht with a long waterline. It can sail superbly close to the wind and, in the hands of an experienced crew, it handles easily even in the roughest conditions. This yacht features a regatta deck which allows every manoeuvre - even reefing - to be carried out from the cockpit. Below deck there's a comfortable, luxuriously finished and almost condensation-free cabin with ample stowage space and a very convenient navigation area with a chart table and instruments' panel. The lifting keel allows the ETAP 23iL to be trailered easily..."

== See also ==
- List of sailing boat types
