= ETAP 23 =

Sailboat class

Development
- Designer: Jacques de Ridder
- Location: Belgium
- Year: 1982
- Builder: ETAP Yachting
- Role: Cruiser
- Name: ETAP 23

Boat
- Displacement: 3,320 lb (1,506 kg)
- Draft: 5.08 ft (1.55 m) with keel down

Hull
- Type: monohull
- Construction: fibreglass
- LOA: 24.20 ft (7.38 m)
- LWL: 19.00 ft (5.79 m)
- Beam: 8.20 ft (2.50 m)
- Engine: outboard motor

Hull appendages
- Keel: lifting keel
- Ballast: 1,036 lb (470 kg)
- Rudder: transom-mounted rudder

Rig
- Rig type: Bermuda rig

Sails
- Sailplan: fractional rigged sloop
- Total sail area: 190.00 sq ft (17.652 m^{2})

Racing
- PHRF: 240

The ETAP 23 is a Belgian trailerable sailboat that was designed by Jacques de Ridder as a cruiser and first built in 1982.

== Production ==
The design was built by ETAP Yachting in Lokeren, Belgium between 1982 and 1989, but it is now out of production.

== Design ==
The ETAP 23 is a recreational keelboat, built predominantly of foam-cored fibreglass, with wood trim. It has a fractional sloop rig, a raked stem, a plumb transom, a transom-hung rudder controlled by a tiller and a weighted bulb lifting keel. It displaces 3,320 lb (1,506 kg) and carries 1,036 lb (470 kg) of ballast.

The boat's construction renders it unsinkable.

The boat has a draft of 5.08 ft (1.55 m) with the lifting keel extended and 2.60 ft (0.79 m) with it retracted, allowing operation in shallow water, or ground transportation on a trailer.

The boat is normally fitted with a small 3 to 6 hp (2 to 4 kW) outboard motor for docking and manoeuvring, mounted in a stern well.

The design has sleeping accommodation for four people, with a double "V"-berth in the bow cabin and two straight settee quarter berths in the main cabin along with a drop-leaf table. The galley is located on the port side, just aft of the bow cabin. The galley is equipped with a two-burner stove, an icebox and a sink. The head is located under the "V"-berth on the port side in the bow cabin. Cabin headroom is 53 in (130 cm).

The design has a PHRF racing average handicap of 240 and a hull speed of 5.8 kn (10.7 km/h).

== Operational history ==
The boat was at one time supported by a class club, the ETAP Owners Association.

In a 2010 review Steve Henkel wrote, "like other small ETAP sailboats, the Belgian-made 23 ... is double skinned, with foam between outside and aside layers of fiberglass. Best features: The foam sandwich construction helps keep the cabin dry and condensation free, as well as muffling noise. It also stiffens the hull structure and makes the boat unsinkable even when filled with water. (We watched at the Annapolis Sailboat Show in 1986 while the ETAP’s seacocks were opened and the boat gradually settled until water was knee-high over the cabin sole, at which point equilibrium was reached and any added water bailed in from outside simply ran out through the seacocks, Then the boat was keeled over to 65 degrees of heel, but popped right up when the hauling lines were released.) The whole boat is extremely well-finished in mahogany and/or teak with polished brass hardware. The wide beam helps to create more usable space ... A ballasted vertical-retracting keel keeps minimum draft low while providing good lowered depth for going upwind. An outboard well is conveniently located in the cockpit near the helm station. Worst features: Price even of well-used boats is high. In this case, you may get what you pay for."

== See also ==
- List of sailing boat types
