= Boat International Media =

- Industry: Media
- Founded: 1983
- Headquarters: Hartfield Road, London, UK
- Products: Boat International; Boat International US Edition; Boat International Russia; Boat International Turkey; Dockwalk; The Superyachts; Futureyachts; Charterfleet

Boat International Media is a luxury lifestyle publishing company based in Wimbledon, London. The company publishes the magazines. Boat International Boat International US Edition and Dockwalk. It runs the websites boatinternational.com and dockwalk.com. It also publishes annual books including, The Superyachts a compendium of some of the biggest and best superyacht launches from the last year.

== Magazines ==
Boat International was launched in 1983 as the senior title in superyachting. It is a monthly, English language, superyachting magazine distributed in 55 different countries. The magazine was relaunched with the same title in 2014 and now includes more lifestyle content aimed at an affluent audience.

Boat International US Edition, originally launched in 1988 as ShowBoats International, is published 11 times a year and distributed throughout North America from a publishing base in Fort Lauderdale, Florida.

In the January editions of Boat International and Boat International US Edition, the company publishes the Top 101 – the list of the world’s biggest superyachts by length. In the same issue, the company publishes the annual Global Order Book, which shows the current state of the superyacht market.

In 2018, the company launched two new external supplements – 12/24, which focuses on yachts between 12 and 24 metres in length; and Life Under Sail, which centres on the sailing lifestyle.

Boat International Turkey is a licensed edition published in Turkish and launched in 2016.

Dockwalk was launched in 1998, and targets captains and crew of superyachts around the globe.

== Annuals ==
At the Monaco Yacht Show each year, the company releases its latest The Superyachts annual, which was originally launched in 1987. The hardback, coffee-table book features some of the biggest and hard-to-access superyachts launched throughout the year.

Charterfleet, first published in 1992, contains superyachts for charter at various locations around the world.

In 2018, the company launched Superyacht Interiors, featuring interviews with leading superyacht designers, and interiors companies serving the superyacht industry.

== Events ==
Each year Boat International Media organises the World Superyacht Awards, which celebrate the best yachts from the previous year. The awards are judged by a panel of superyacht owners and industry leaders who undertake to visit as many of the nominated yachts as possible before making their judgements. In 2020, the Awards will be held in London in May. Previous editions have been held in Istanbul, Venice, Amsterdam and Florence.

The Superyacht Design Festival is another annual event, originally launched in 2008, which attracts an audience of superyacht designers, builders and owners. After a number of years in the Austrian ski resort of Kitzbuhel, the event is moving to the Italian ski resort of Cortina d’Ampezzo in January 2019.

At the Superyacht Design Symposium each year, the winners of the annual Design & innovation Awards are also revealed. These are awarded to designers and builders of superyachts for styling, naval architecture, innovation and technology.

The Young Designer of the Year is an annual competition for up and coming designers.

The Ocean Awards were launched in 2015, and celebrate the people and projects working towards the protection of the oceans. The event aims to "recognise individuals, community groups, organisations and businesses that have made significant contributions to the health of the marine environment, to the sustainable management of marine resources, or to public engagement with the oceans and seas". Previous winners of awards have included charity founders, scientific researchers, lawyers and documentary producers.

In 2018, Boat International Media also launched Ocean Talks, a day of presentations and networking, bringing together activists, scientists and members from the superyacht community in order to discuss the issues facing our oceans. The 2018 edition was held at the Royal Geographical Society in London.

== Boat Pro ==
In 2018, the company launched its Boat Pro data service – available via paid subscription. The service aims to supply subscribers with live market data on the superyacht industry.

== The Owners' Club ==
Founded in October 2014, the Owners' Club is a newsletter for superyacht owners. That has a calendar of events throughout the year and around the world, from Mallorca to Monaco and Miami.
