= DB-2 =

Sailboat class

Development
- Designer: E. G. van de Stadt and Cees van Tongeren
- Location: West Germany
- Year: 1981
- Builder: Dehler Yachts
- Role: Racer
- Name: DB-2

Boat
- Displacement: 6,945 lb (3,150 kg)
- Draft: 6.23 ft (1.90 m)

Hull
- Type: Monohull
- Construction: Fiberglass
- LOA: 33.14 ft (10.10 m)
- LWL: 26.24 ft (8.00 m)
- Beam: 11.15 ft (3.40 m)
- Engine: Yanmar diesel engine

Hull appendages
- Keel: fin keel
- Ballast: 3,627 lb (1,645 kg)
- Rudder: internally-mounted spade-type rudder

Rig
- Rig type: Bermuda rig
- I foretriangle height: 38.55 ft (11.75 m)
- J foretriangle base: 11.64 ft (3.55 m)
- P mainsail luff: 43.30 ft (13.20 m)
- E mainsail foot: 15.75 ft (4.80 m)

Sails
- Sailplan: Fractional rigged sloop
- Mainsail area: 340.99 sq ft (31.679 m^{2})
- Jib/genoa area: 224.36 sq ft (20.844 m^{2})
- Total sail area: 565.35 sq ft (52.523 m^{2})

Racing
- PHRF: 129 (average)

The DB-2 is a West German sailboat that was designed by E. G. van de Stadt and Cees van Tongeren as an International Offshore Rule Three-Quarter Ton class racer and first built in 1981.

The DB-1 design was developed into the DB-2 in 1981, with modifications that included a walk-through transom, lighter weight, more ballast and increased sail area.

== Production ==
The design was built by Dehler Yachts, owned by the Dehler brothers, Willi and Heinz, in West Germany starting in 1981, but it is now out of production.

== Design ==
Like the DB-1, the DB-2 is one of several variations of Stadt design 320. It is a recreational keelboat, built predominantly of fiberglass, with wood trim. It has a fractional sloop rig with running backstays, a raked stem, a reverse transom, an internally mounted spade-type rudder controlled by a tiller and a fixed fin keel. It displaces 6,945 lb (3,150 kg) and carries 3,627 lb (1,645 kg) of lead ballast.

The boat has a draft of 6.23 ft (1.90 m) with the standard keel fitted.

The boat is fitted with a Yanmar diesel engine for docking and maneuvering. The fuel tank holds 10 U.S. gallons (38 L; 8.3 imp gal) and the fresh water tank has a capacity of 19.8 U.S. gallons (75 L; 16.5 imp gal).

The design has a head located forward and no "V"-berth, the bow area being reserved for sail storage since the boats were delivered with 11 different sails. The galley is amidships on the port side and includes a two-burner stove. No icebox is provided. Sleeping accommodation consists of two settee berths, two quarter berths and two pilot berths. A navigation station id provided on the starboard side and includes chart storage.

For racing all the lines are led to the cockpit. Storage is provided under the cockpit. The design uses both standing and running backstays and has winches for the running backstays. There are also two winches for the genoa sheets and two winches for the halyards. The mainsheet traveller is located across the cockpit. Track-mounted Barber haulers are provided for both the jib and genoa to control sail twist downwind when sheets are eased. The boom vang is a solid tube design and a Cunningham is fitted for sail adjustment.

The design has a PHRF racing average handicap of 129.

== Operational history ==
The design came in first, second, third and fifth places in the 1984 IOR 3/4 ton cup races held in Kiel, West Germany.

In a 1992 review Richard Sherwood wrote, "The db is claimed to be the fastest one-design production 3/4-tonner in the world, and she has won at Cowes, at Kiel, and in the Southern Ocean Racing Circuit. The emphasis is on racing rather than cruising."

Sailboatdata notes "On the international racing circuit, the DB models proved unbeatable for a few years in 3/4 ton level racing. (1983-84)."

== See also ==
- List of sailing boat types

Related development

- DB-1

Similar sailboats

- C&C 3/4 Ton
- C&C SR 33
- Hobie 33
- San Juan 33S
- Tartan Ten
