= San Juan 33S =

Sailboat class

Development
- Designer: David Pedrick
- Location: United States
- Year: 1981
- Builder: Clark Boat Company
- Role: Racer
- Name: San Juan 33S

Boat
- Displacement: 5,700 lb (2,585 kg)
- Draft: 5.50 ft (1.68 m)

Hull
- Type: Monohull
- Construction: Fiberglass
- LOA: 33.10 ft (10.09 m)
- LWL: 27.80 ft (8.47 m)
- Beam: 7.95 ft (2.42 m)
- Engine: optional

Hull appendages
- Keel: fin keel
- Ballast: 3,500 lb (1,588 kg)
- Rudder: internally-mounted spade-type rudder

Rig
- Rig type: Bermuda rig
- I foretriangle height: 35.10 ft (10.70 m)
- J foretriangle base: 11.48 ft (3.50 m)
- P mainsail luff: 40.03 ft (12.20 m)
- E mainsail foot: 13.12 ft (4.00 m)

Sails
- Sailplan: Fractional rigged sloop
- Mainsail area: 262.60 sq ft (24.396 m^{2})
- Jib/genoa area: 201.47 sq ft (18.717 m^{2})
- Total sail area: 464.07 sq ft (43.114 m^{2})

Racing
- D-PN: 76.2

The San Juan 33S (sometimes just called the San Juan 33) is an American sailboat that was designed by David Pedrick as racer and first built in 1981.

== Production ==
The design was built by the Clark Boat Company in Kent, Washington, United States from 1981 to 1982, but it is now out of production.

== Design ==
The San Juan 33S is a recreational keelboat, built predominantly of fiberglass. It has a fractional sloop rig with aluminum spars, a raked stem, a reverse transom, an internally mounted spade-type rudder controlled by a tiller and a fixed fin keel. It displaces 5,700 lb (2,585 kg) and carries 3,500 lb (1,588 kg) of ballast.

The boat has a draft of 5.50 ft (1.68 m) with the standard keel fitted.

The boat may be optionally fitted with an inboard engine for docking and maneuvering. The fresh water tank has a capacity of 9 U.S. gallons (34 L; 7.5 imp gal).

A galley is optional and can include a two-burner stove. A head is also optional and can be a marine type or portable. If fitted, it is located in the bow. Sleeping accommodation consists of four single settee berths, along with sail storage space.

For sailing all halyards are led to the cockpit. The cockpit also has six winches, two primary, two secondary and two for the spinnaker. The mainsail features a mainsheet traveler, jiffy reefing and a reefing flattening system. The boat is also equipped with a boom vang, an internal mainsail outhaul and an optional jib headfoil (a headsail airfoil-shaped reinforcement). The standing rigging is of steel rod and there is an adjustable split backstay to shape the highly flexible mast.

The design has a Portsmouth Yardstick racing average handicap of 76.2.

== Operational history ==
In a 1994 review Richard Sherwood wrote, "this San Juan is designed for racing, and accommodations are somewhat austere. She is ultra light. The fractional rig allows for a larger-than-normal mainsail; the smaller foresails are easier to handle. The unusually narrow beam means that initial stability is limited, but the ballast/displacement ratio of 60 percent is very high. The designer claims that the only need for a genoa to replace the self-tending jib is in very light airs."

== See also ==
- List of sailing boat types

=== Similar sailboats ===
- C&C 3/4 Ton
- C&C SR 33
- DB-1
- DB-2
- Hobie 33
- Tartan Ten
