= Hobie 33 =

33-foot one-design sailboat

Development
- Designer: Hobie Alter and Phil Edwards
- Location: United States
- Year: 1982
- No. built: 187
- Builder: Hobie Cat
- Name: Hobie 33

Boat
- Displacement: 4,000 lb (1,814 kg)
- Draft: 5.50 ft (1.68 m)

Hull
- Type: Monohull
- Construction: Fiberglass
- LOA: 33.00 ft (10.06 m)
- LWL: 30.50 ft (9.30 m)
- Beam: 8.00 ft (2.44 m)
- Engine: Outboard motor

Hull appendages
- Keel: Lifting keel
- Ballast: 1,900 lb (862 kg)
- Rudder: internally-mounted spade-type rudder

Rig
- Rig type: Bermuda rig
- I foretriangle height: 33.83 ft (10.31 m)
- J foretriangle base: 12.40 ft (3.78 m)
- P mainsail luff: 35.13 ft (10.71 m)
- E mainsail foot: 12.50 ft (3.81 m)

Sails
- Sailplan: 7/8 Fractional rigged sloop
- Mainsail area: 219.56 sq ft (20.398 m^{2})
- Jib/genoa area: 209.75 sq ft (19.486 m^{2})
- Spinnaker area: 838 sq ft (77.9 m^{2})
- Total sail area: 429.31 sq ft (39.884 m^{2})

Racing
- D-PN: 73.0

The Hobie 33 is an American sailboat that was designed by Hobie Alter and Phil Edwards as one-design racer and first built in 1982. It was the first monohull design for Alter and his company, after establishing their reputations for their lines of surfboards and catamarans

== Production ==
The design was built by Hobie Cat in the United States from 1982 until 1987, with 187 examples completed, but it is now out of production.

== Design ==
The Hobie 33 is a recreational keelboat, built predominantly of a polyester and fiberglass sandwich, with wood trim. Very light for its size with a displacement of 4,000 lb (1,814 kg), it has a 7/8 fractional sloop rig with aluminum spars, a raked stem, a reverse transom, an internally mounted spade-type rudder controlled by a tiller and a fixed fin keel or lifting keel with a bulb weight. It displaces 4,000 lb (1,814 kg) and carries 1,900 lb (862 kg) of lead ballast.

The lifting keel version of the design uses a "bolt-down" style of keel, It has a draft of 5.50 ft (1.68 m) with the lifting keel extended and 1.83 ft (0.56 m) with it retracted, allowing ground transportation on a trailer. It has a very narrow beam of 8.00 ft (2.44 m) to meet the legal requirements for highway trailer widths. It mast is hinged at the mast step and the spinnaker pole is used to raise the mast for quick launching with a small crew.

The boat is normally fitted with a small outboard motor for docking and maneuvering. The outboard is fitted into a stern well, that allows the motor to be swung up and a hatch closed to fair the opening.

The galley is limited to a dish locker, an icebox under the companionway steps and provisions for an optional alcohol-fired stove. The fresh water tank has a capacity of 5 U.S. gallons (19 L; 4.2 imp gal). There is a sink fed by pumped water, vanity and space for a portable-type head to be installed. Sleeping accommodations are provided for five people on a bow "V"-berth, two under-cockpit single berths and one main cabin settee berth.

There are six port fixed lights in a tapered shape and a forward acrylic plastic hatch for ventilation.

The cockpit has two sheet winches and all lines, including the halyards, lead to the cockpit. A 838 sq ft (77.9 m^{2}) spinnaker can be used for downwind sailing. The genoa employs a headfoil (a headsail airfoil-shaped reinforcement) and a concealed backstay adjuster. The mainsheet and the boom vang both have 4:1 mechanical advantages. There is a topping lift and an internal outhaul line.

The design has a Portsmouth Yardstick racing average handicap of 73.0 and a hull speed of 7.44 kn (14 km/h).

== Reception ==
In a 1994 review, Richard Sherwood, described the boat, "This boat is Hobie Alter’s first venture into monohulls and off-shore boats. She is ultra-light-displacement and designed for one-design racing, but will sleep two couples. The 33 tends to sail well heeled. The narrow beam is required so the boat can be trailered. The keel is lifted for trailering, and it is bolted down for sailing."

== See also ==
- List of sailing boat types

Similar sailboats

- C&C 3/4 Ton
- C&C SR 33
- DB-1
- DB-2
- San Juan 33S
- Tartan Ten
