= Sealine =

English motor yacht brand

- Current owner: Aurelius SE
- Produced by: HanseYachts AG
- Country: Germany
- Introduced: 1972
- Website: www.sealine.com

Sealine is an English brand of motor yachts. It is originated in the former Sealine boatyard in Kidderminster that was founded in the 1970s by Tom Murrant. As of 2013, the brand belongs to the parent company of German HanseYachts AG.

== History ==
=== Founding and rise (1972–1997) ===
The English aircraft engineer and boating enthusiast Tom Murrant (1939–2005) founded the Sealine parent company Fibrasonic Marine Ltd. in 1972 with the help of three other persons. Manufacturing started near Bobbington, Staffordshire. The first model was a 23 ft GRP family cruiser with sterndrive (23 Continental). In the wake of the world oil crisis 1973, the young company suffered and survived several years by producing items for other sectors and as subcontractor for other boat builders. In 1978, Fibrasonic Marine presented two models under the new brand name C-Line. Furthermore, the company moved to a larger site in Kidderminster, Worcestershire. In 1979, C-Line became Sealine, and an 18 ft weekender with coloured hull was launched. More and more, the brand stood out with clever space utilisation and versatility.

In the 1980s, the models 30 Fly and 285 Ambassador were brought to the market and became best sellers. In the 1990s, Sealine entered the US-market and rose to one of the "Big Four" British motorboat builders (alongside Fairline, Sunseeker and Princess).

=== Changes of ownership (1998–2013) ===
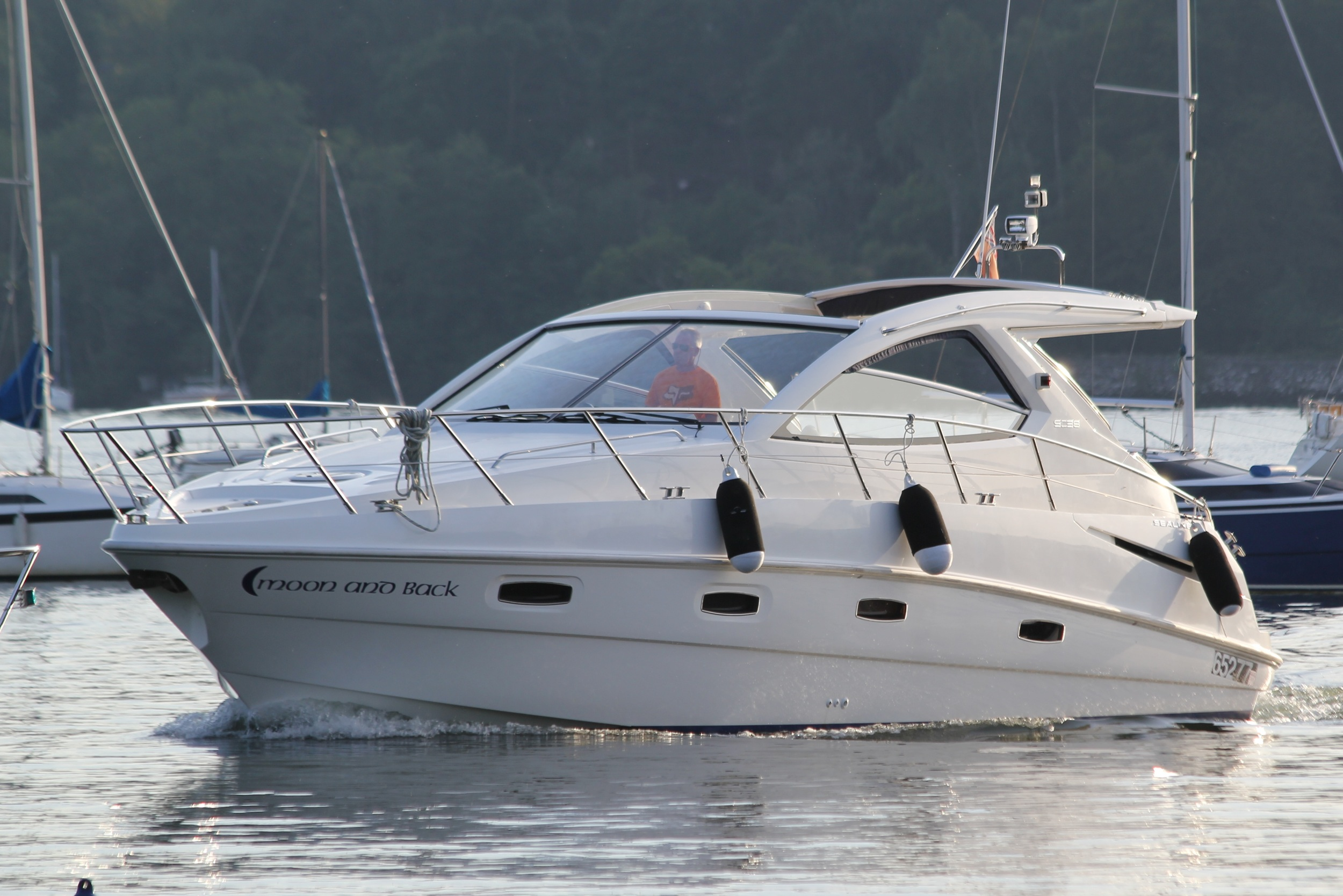
Sealine SC38 (2007–2011)

In 1998, a period of substantial changes began. Tom Murrant and his Co-partners sold the company for US$45 million to a group of venture capitalists headed by the English industrialist Gerard Wainwright who started to improve build-quality and design. Only three years later, Wainwright sold Sealine for US$68 million to US-based Brunswick Corporation. The new owner implemented advanced manufacturing structures, widened the range upwards and tried to attract the market with luxury. In 2004, a T60 was launched, the biggest Sealine ever.

Like the whole sector, Sealine was severely affected by the 2008 financial crisis. In 2011, Brunswick sold the company to US-based private equity firm Oxford Investment Group. In April 2013, Sealine went into administration. Attempts to sell the company as a whole came to nothing. The manufacturing site in Kidderminster was closed. Around 300 employees (that had left from the 600-strong staff in the best days) lost their jobs. The brand besides moulds, plans, parts lists and equipment was purchased by German Aurelius SE, Munich, the parent company of German boat manufacturer HanseYachts.

=== Restart in Germany (2014–present) ===
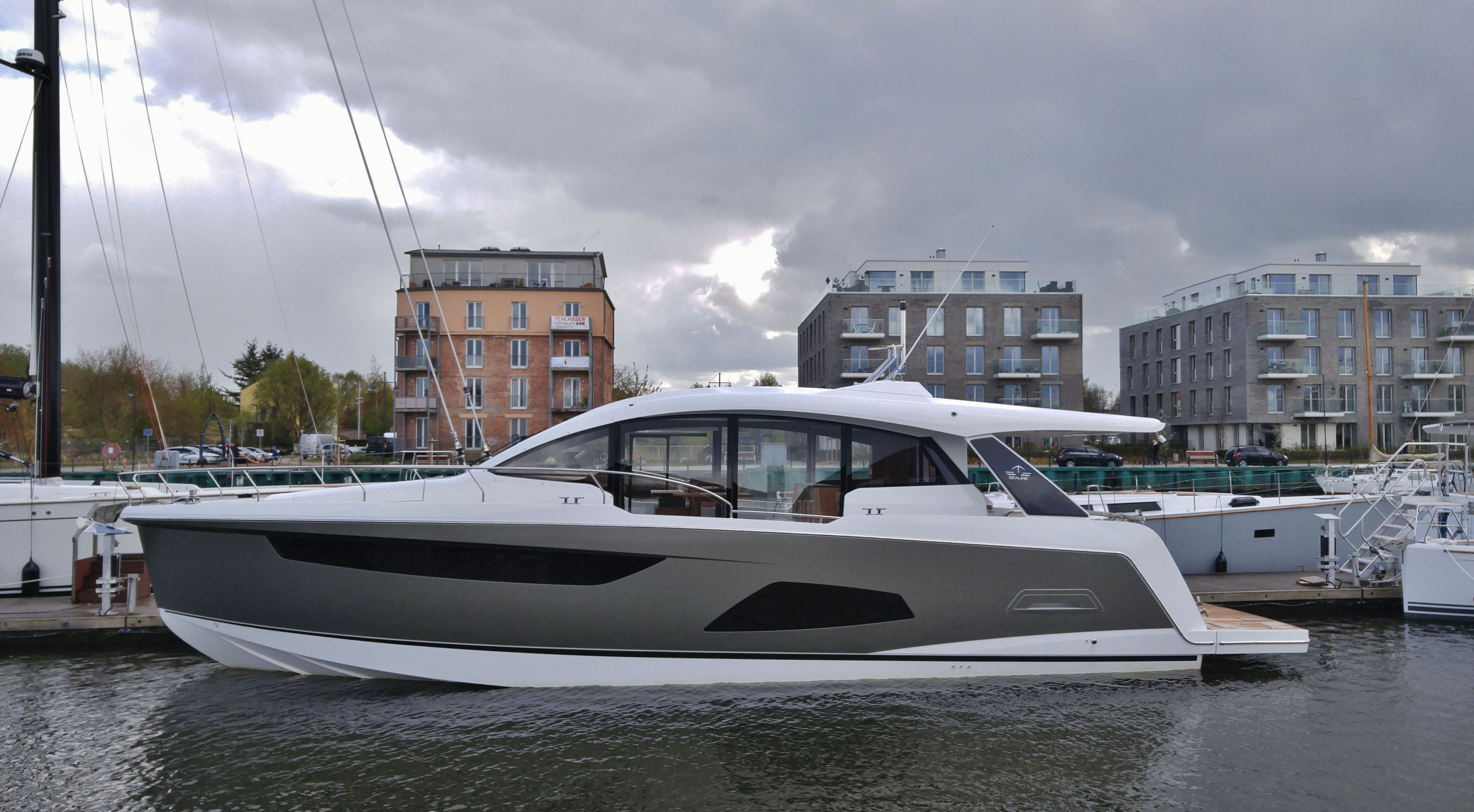
Sealine C530 (since 2017)

In 2014, HanseYachts started to produce the adopted Sealine models S450 (formerly SC42) and F450 (formerly F42). A German subcontractor temporarily produced the also adopted S380 (formerly SC35). Furthermore, HanseYachts appointed the British naval architect Bill Dixon as designer for all Sealine models and presented the first new model F380 (SC35 advancement). In 2014/15, the first two Dixon designed models S330 and C330 were launched.

== Trivia ==
In the late 1980s, a Sealine 285 Ambassador named "Sea Gybsy" starred in the BBC drama "Howards Way".

== Current models (specs) ==
Model	Launch	L max (m)	L max (ft)	Beam (m)	Beam (ft)	Displ. (t)	Displ. (lbs)	Engines	Power (hp)
S330 ^{1}	2014	10.31	33' 10"	3.50	11' 6"	6.1	13,500	Volvo Penta, 1 × D6-340 / 1 × D6-400 / 2 × D3-220	340–440
S330v ^{1, 4}	2018	11.01	36' 1"	3.50	11' 6"	7.1	15,600	Mercury or Suzuki, 2 × 300 / 2 × 350	600–700
C335 ^{2}	2021	10.31	33' 10"	3.50	11' 6"	6.7	14,700	Volvo Penta, 1 × D6-340 / 1 × D6-400 / 2 × D3-220	340–440
C335v ^{2, 4}	2021	11.01	36' 1"	3.50	11' 6"	7.3	16,000	Mercury or Suzuki, 2 × 300 / 2 × 350	600–700
C390 ^{2}	2019	12.50	41' 0"	3.85	12' 8"	10.5	23,200	Volvo Penta, 2 × D4-300 / 2 × D6-380	600–760
C390v ^{2, 4}	2020	12.42	40' 9"	3.85	12' 8"	10.4	22,800	Suzuki, 2 × 350	700
S430 ^{1}	2020	13.55	44' 4"	4.20	13' 9"	12.4	27,200	Volvo Penta, 2 × IPS 450 / 2 × IPS 500 / 2 × IPS 600	680–880
C430 ^{2}	2017	13.55	44' 4"	4.20	13' 9"	13.4	29,600	Volvo Penta, 2 × IPS 500 / 2 × IPS 600	760–880
F430 ^{3}	2018	13.55	44' 4"	4.20	13' 9"	13.6	29,900	Volvo Penta, 2 × IPS 500 / 2 × IPS 600	760–880
C530 ^{2}	2017	16.13	52' 11"	4.56	14' 11"	20.3	44,800	Volvo Penta, 2 × IPS 700 / 2 × IPS 800	1,100–1,200
F530 ^{3}	2016	16.13	52' 11"	4.56	14' 11"	20.4	45,000	Volvo Penta, 2 × IPS 700 / 2 × IPS 800	1,100–1,200

^{1} Sport model, ^{2} Cruiser model,^{3} Flybridge model, ^{4} Model with outboard engines

Naval architect: Bill Dixon

== Awards ==
- Sealine F380 – “Motor Boat Award 2015” for the “Best Flybridge under 55 ft”
- Sealine S330 and C330 – "Motor Boat Award 2016" for the "Best Sportscruiser up to 45 ft"
