= ETAP 28 =

Sailboat class

Development
- Designer: E. G. van de Stadt
- Location: Belgium
- Year: 1978
- No. built: 375
- Builder: ETAP Yachting
- Role: Cruiser
- Name: ETAP 28

Boat
- Displacement: 6,610 lb (2,998 kg)
- Draft: 5.40 ft (1.65 m)

Hull
- Type: monohull
- Construction: glassfibre
- LOA: 27.62 ft (8.42 m)
- LWL: 22.67 ft (6.91 m)
- Beam: 10.00 ft (3.05 m)
- Engine: Volvo Penta MD 7A 13 hp (10 kW) diesel engine

Hull appendages
- Keel: fin keel
- Ballast: 2,557 lb (1,160 kg)
- Rudder: internally-mounted spade-type rudder

Rig
- Rig type: Bermuda rig
- I foretriangle height: 33.00 ft (10.06 m)
- J foretriangle base: 11.20 ft (3.41 m)
- P mainsail luff: 29.10 ft (8.87 m)
- E mainsail foot: 9.20 ft (2.80 m)

Sails
- Sailplan: masthead sloop
- Mainsail area: 133.86 sq ft (12.436 m^{2})
- Jib/genoa area: 184.80 sq ft (17.168 m^{2})
- Total sail area: 318.66 sq ft (29.604 m^{2})

The ETAP 28 is a Belgian sailboat that was designed by E. G. van de Stadt as a cruiser and first built in 1978.

== Production ==
The design was built by ETAP Yachting in Belgium between 1978 and 1987, with 375 boats completed, but it is now out of production.

== Design ==
The ETAP 28 is a recreational keelboat, built predominantly of glassfibre. It has a masthead sloop rig, a raked stem, a plumb transom, an internally mounted spade-type rudder controlled by a tiller and a fixed fin keel. It displaces 6,610 lb (2,998 kg) and carries 2,557 lb (1,160 kg) of ballast.

The boat has a draft of 5.40 ft (1.65 m) with the standard keel.

The boat is fitted with a Swedish Volvo Penta MD 7A diesel engine of 13 hp (10 kW) for docking and manoeuvring.

For sailing downwind the design may be equipped with a spinnaker.

The design has a hull speed of 6.38 kn (11.82 km/h).

== Operational history ==
The boat was at one time supported by a class club, the ETAP Owners Association.

== See also ==
- List of sailing boat types
