= Prospect 900 =

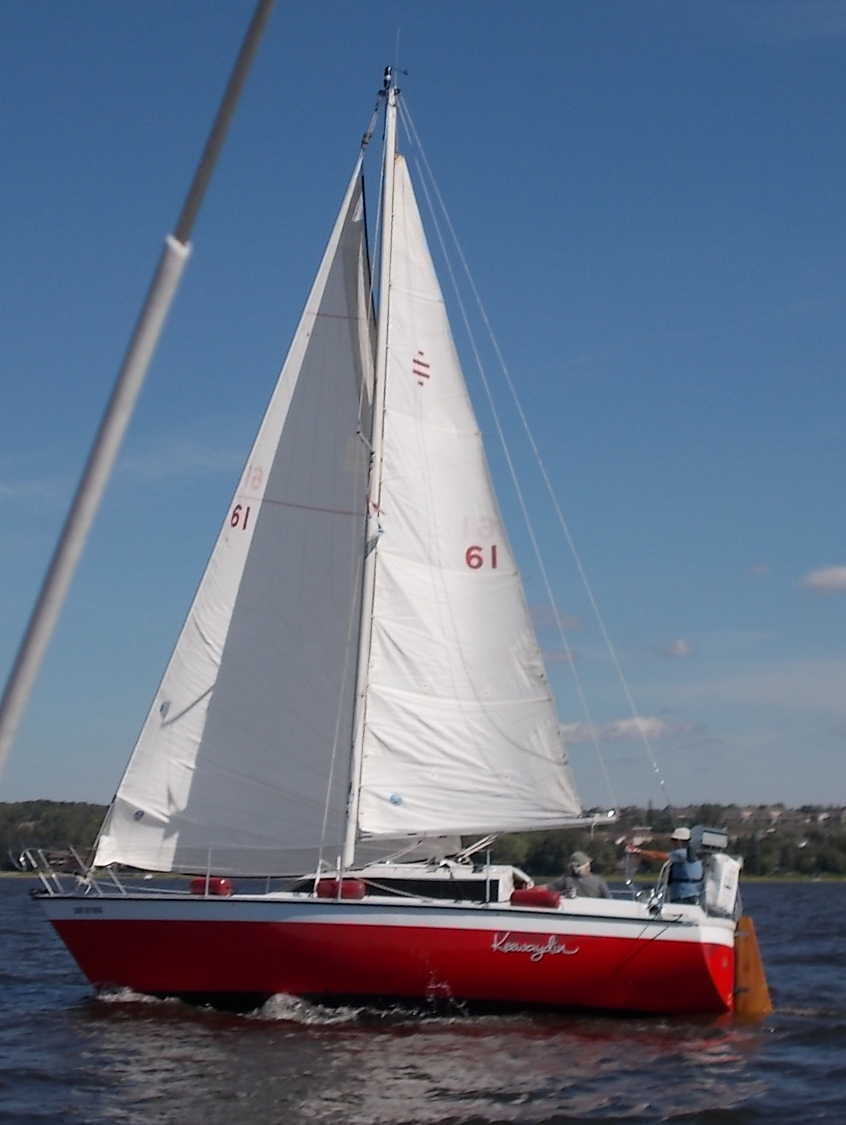

Development
- Designer: Ericus Gerhardus van de Stadt
- Location: Netherlands
- Year: 1975
- Builder: Rydgeway Marine
- Name: Prospect 900

Boat
- Displacement: 7,275 lb (3,300 kg)
- Draft: 4.92 ft (1.50 m)

Hull
- Type: Monohull
- Construction: Fiberglass
- LOA: 28.83 ft (8.79 m)
- LWL: 22.42 ft (6.83 m)
- Beam: 9.17 ft (2.80 m)
- Engine: Volvo MD5A diesel engine 8 hp (6 kW)

Hull appendages
- Keel: lifting keel
- Ballast: 3,086 lb (1,400 kg)
- Rudder: internally-mounted spade-type/transom-mounted rudder

Rig
- General: Masthead sloop

Sails
- Total sail area: 291 sq ft (27.0 m^{2})

The Prospect 900 is a sailboat that was designed by Dutch naval architect Ericus Gerhardus van de Stadt and first built in 1975.

== Production ==
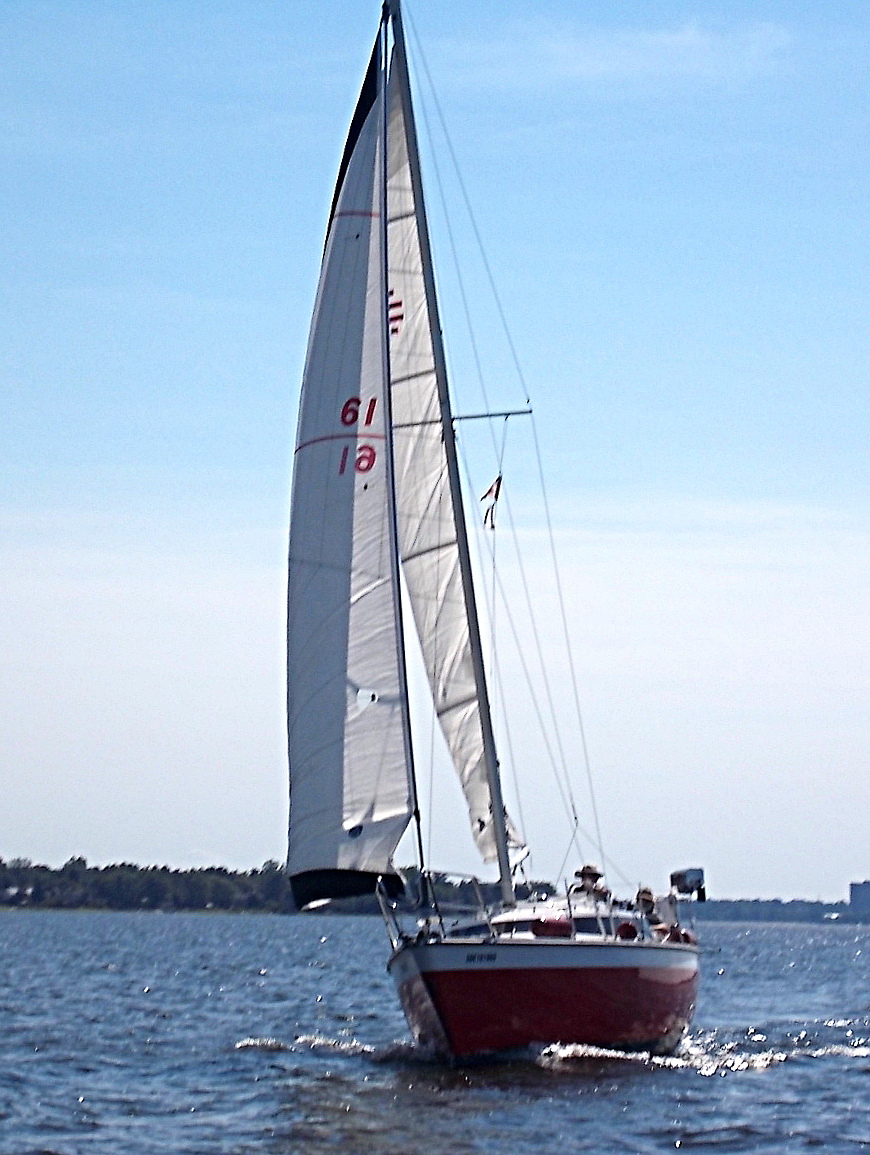
Prospect 900

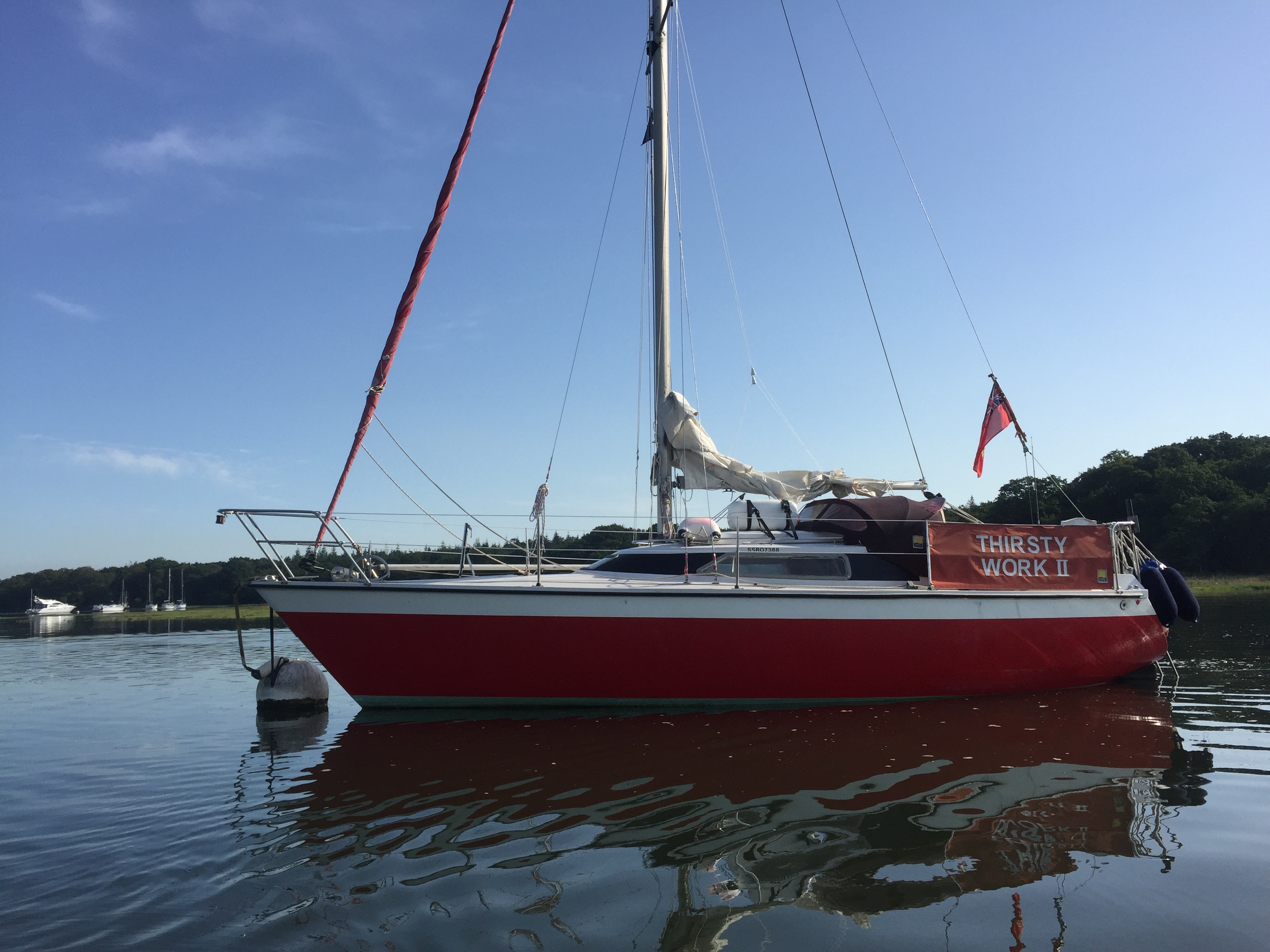
Prospect 900

The boat was built by Rydgeway Marine in the United Kingdom, starting in 1975, but is now out of production.

== Design ==
The Prospect 900 is a small recreational keelboat, built predominantly of fiberglass. It has a masthead sloop rig, an internally-mounted spade-type rudder and a lifting keel. It displaces 7,275 lb (3,300 kg) and carries 3,086 lb (1,400 kg) of iron ballast. The boat has a draft of 4.92 ft (1.50 m) with the lifting keel extended.

The boat is fitted with a Volvo MD5A diesel engine of 8 hp (6 kW). It has a 35 U.S. gallons (130 L; 29 imp gal) fresh water tank and 10 U.S. gallons (38 L; 8.3 imp gal) fuel tank.

The boat has a hull speed of 6.34 kn (11.74 km/h).

== See also ==
- List of sailing boat types
