= Dehler Yachts =

Yacht manufacturer and brand

Dehler
- Current owner: HanseYachts AG
- Produced by: HanseYachts AG
- Country: Germany
- Introduced: 1963
- Website: www.dehler.com

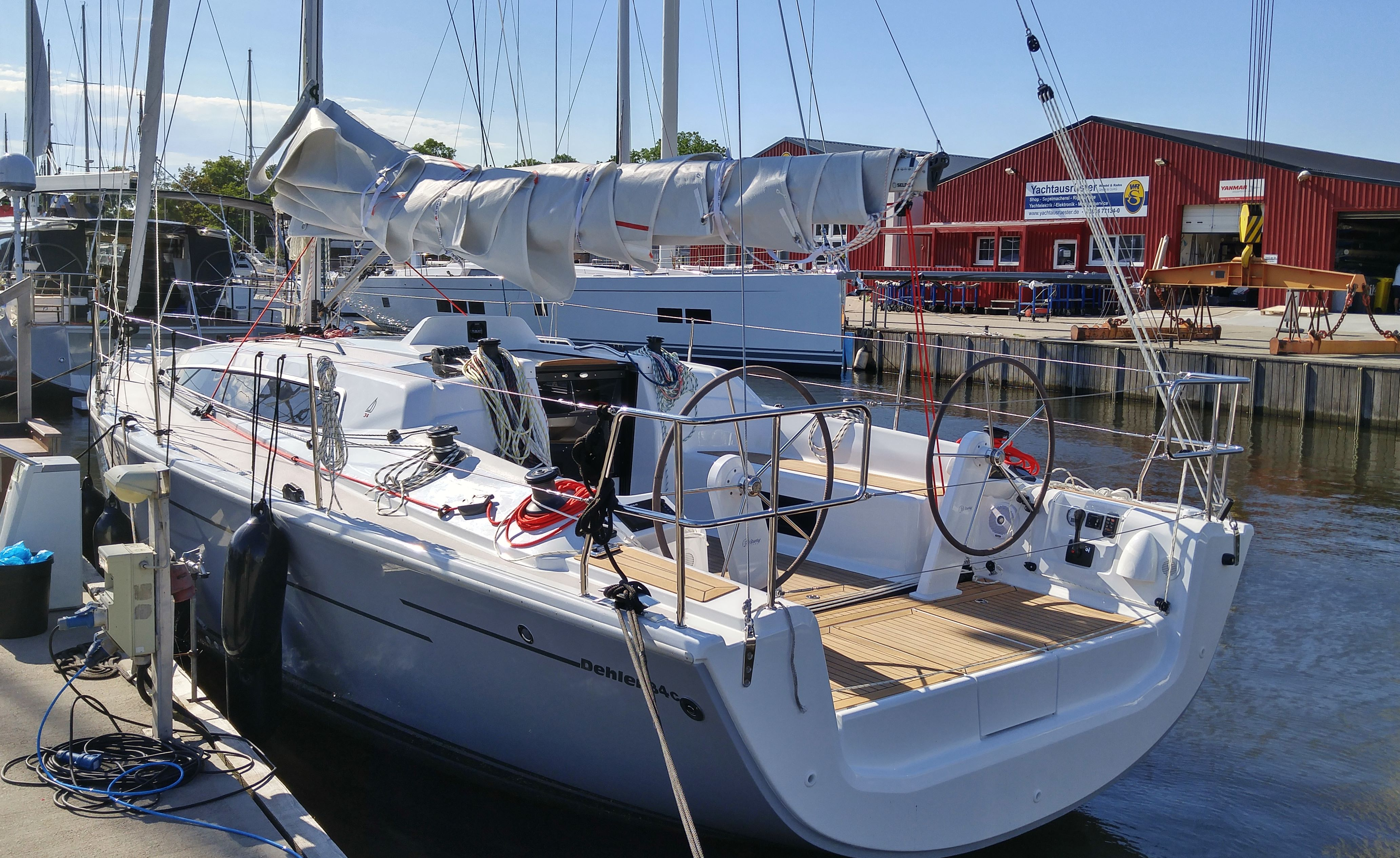
Dehler 34 (since 2016)

Dehler is a German brand of sailing yachts. It is originated in the former Dehler shipyard that was founded in the 1960s by Willi and Heinz Dehler. As of 2009, the brand belongs to German yacht manufacturer HanseYachts, Greifswald. Dehler cooperates with the yacht design studio Judel/Vrolijk & Co. The current range comprises six models from 29 to 46 ft in length.

== History ==
=== Founding and rise ===
Willi Dehler (1929-1999) was one of the first in Europe, who recognized the capability of GRP for boat building. In 1963, he started to produce small dinghies in the former foyers of a cinema and had success. He took his brother Heinz in, and in 1966 they launched the Varianta, their first sailboat. This 21 ft long cabin boat with keel centerboard and removable coach roof (design: E.G. van de Stadt) became the most successful family cruiser ever, with a total production of about 4,000 units until 1982. Further cruising models like the Optima and the Delanta followed and Dehler Yachtbau rose to become a leading manufacturer of sailboats in Germany.

=== Sportive successes in the 1970s and 80s ===
In the 1970s, Willi Dehler also began to develop innovative boats for racing. He launched the Sprinta (design: E.G. van de Stadt/Cees van Tongeren), a Quarter-Tonner, whose sharpened version - the Sprinta Sport - became a popular one-design class and could excel in IOR regattas. As a licensed manufacturer of 470 class dingies since 1974, Dehler could record a gold medal in the Olympic Games 1976 won by Frank Hübner and Harro Bode. In the Three-Quarter Ton class the DB-1 (1980) and DB-2 (1981) made a splash (both designs: E.G. van de Stadt/Cees van Tongeren). The cruising version of this models - the Dehler 34 - sold very well and is popular till now.

=== Changes of ownership and further development ===
In 1979, Heinz Dehler left the company. Willi Dehler followed in 1995. In the wake of a slump in yacht building during the mid-1990s, Dehler Yachtbau got into an economic crisis which culminated in a first bankruptcy in 1998. The shipyard was taken over by Dutch Neptunus Group. In cooperation with the yacht design studio Judel/Vrolijk & Co, a new range of fast cruisers up to 47 ft was launched.

In 2004, Dehler was sold to the Dutch businessman Wilan van den Berg who joined as managing director, appointed a cooperation with the yacht designers Simonis Voogd and forced growth. In 2007, German private equity firm Buchanan Capital Partners acquired a minority stake in Dehler. Few weeks later, Dehler acquired the Belgium yacht manufacturer ETAP Yachting. In 2008, a Dehler 60 was introduced, the largest Dehler ever which was too costly for the company at that time. Hull number one remained a single piece.

During the 2008 financial crisis, Dehler Yachtbau had to file for bankruptcy again. Etap was cut off, and the Dehler yard was taken over by German HanseYachts AG in 2009. As a consequence, the cooperation with Judel/Vrolijk & Co was renewed. In 2012, HanseYachts announced the close-down of the Dehler factory in Freienohl and relocated the entire production to HanseYachts headquarters in Greifswald (Baltic Sea).

In 2014, the Dehler 38 was displayed as "European Yacht of the Year" in the category "Performance Cruiser".

=== Dehler 30 od (one-design class) ===
In 2019, Dehler presented a one-design class focusing on short-handed offshore racing. The Dehler 30 one design has a water ballast system and a retractable shaft line with fixed propeller and 10 hp diesel engine ("Dehler Stealth Drive"). The initial plan of a retractable electric drive was discarded in the course of development. The Dehler 30 od has been awarded as "European Yacht of the Year 2020" in the category "Race Yachts".

== Current models (specs) ==
Weights and measures (metric)
Model	Length o. a. (m)	Beam (m)	Draught (m) stand^{1} / comp^{2} / shall^{3} / L^{4}	Displacement (t) stand / comp / shall / L	Sail area (sq m) stand / comp / comp carb^{6}
Dehler 29	8.75	2.99	1.58 / 1.80 / 1.22 / -	3.7 / 3.6 / 3.9 / -	43.1 / 43.1 / -
Dehler 30 od^{5}	10.30	3.25	2.20	2.8	63.0
Dehler 34	10.70	3.60	1.95 / 2.10 / 1.55 / -	6.0 / 5.6 / 6.1 / -	65.0 / 71.0 / -
Dehler 38 SQ	11.64	3.75	2.03 / 2.24 / 1.60 / -	7.5 / 7.0 / 7.6 / -	78.6 / 83.6 / 84.6
Dehler 42	12.84	3.91	2.15 / 2.38 / 1.98 / 2.16	9.1 / 8.7 / 9.5 / 9.2	93.0 / 105.5 / -
Dehler 46	14.76	4.35	2.25 / 2.58 / 1.87 / 2.48	11.5 / 11.2 / 11.9 / 11.4	114.1 / 121.0 / -

^{1} standard version, ^{2} competition version, ^{3} shallow keel, ^{4} L-keel (medium, west coast), ^{5} one design class,
^{6} competition version with carbon mast

Weights and measures (imperial)
Model	Length o. a. (ft)	Beam (ft)	Draught (ft) stand^{1} / comp^{2} / shall^{3} / L^{4}	Displacement (lbs) stand / comp / shall / L	Sail area (sq ft) stand / comp / comp carb^{6}
Dehler 29	28' 8"	9' 10"	5' 2" / 5' 11" / 3' 12" / -	8,200 / 7,900 / 8,600 / -	463 / 463 / -
Dehler 30 od^{5}	33' 10"	10' 8"	7' 3"	6,200	678
Dehler 34	35' 1"	11' 10"	6' 5" / 6' 11" / 5' 1" / -	13,200 / 12,300 / 13,400 / -	700 / 764 / -
Dehler 38 SQ	38' 2"	12' 4"	6' 8" / 7' 5" / 5' 3" / -	16,500 / 15,400 / 16,800 / -	846 / 900 / 911
Dehler 42	42' 2"	12' 10"	7' 1" / 7' 10" / 6' 6" / 7' 1"	20,100 / 19,200 / 20,900 / 20,300	1,001 / 1,135 / -
Dehler 46	48' 5"	14' 3"	7' 5" / 8' 6" / 6' 2" / 8' 2"	25,400 / 24,700 / 26,200 / 25,100	1,228 / 1,302 / -

^{1} standard version, ^{2} competition version, ^{3} shallow keel, ^{4} L-keel (medium, west coast), ^{5} one design class,
^{6} competition version with carbon mast

Sail area to displacement ratio (metric and imperial)
Model	SA/D (metric) stand^{1} / comp^{2} / comp carb^{3} / shall^{4} / L^{5}	SA/D (imperial) stand / comp / comp carb / shall / L
Dehler 29	4.2 / 4.3 / - / 4.2 / -	18.3 / 18.6 / - / 17.7 / -
Dehler 30 od^{6}	5.6	32.2
Dehler 34	4.4 / 4.7 / - / 4.4 / -	20.0 / 22.9 / - / 19.8 / -
Dehler 38 SQ	4.5 / 4.8 / 4.8 / 4.5 / -	20.8 / 23.2 / 23.5 / 20.7 / -
Dehler 42	4.6 / 5.0 / - / 4.5 / 4.6	21.7 / 25.3 / - / 21.1 / 21.5
Dehler 46	4.7 / 4.9 / - / 4.7 / 4.7	22.8 / 24.6 / - / 22.3 / 22.9

^{1} standard version, ^{2} competition version, ^{3} competition version with carbon mast, ^{4} shallow keel, ^{5} L-keel (medium, west coast)
^{6} one design class

Naval architecture: Judel/Vrolijk & Co

== Previous models produced ==
- Dehler 22
- Dehler 25
