= E. G. van de Stadt =

Ericus (Ricus) Gerhardus van de Stadt (4 February 1910 – 7 September 1999) was a Dutch yacht designer. He was the founder of industrial yacht building in the Netherlands.

== Yacht designer ==
E.G. van de Stadt went through the HTS (technical college), completing his training as a naval architect in 1932. With the help of family and friends, he started a shipyard in Zaandam and a ships wharf and design company for small wooden boats. In 1936, he went to the Olympic Games as a reserve for the Netherlands Olympic sailing team.

In 1939, van de Stadt designed the Valk for the Bruynzeel company to demonstrate the possibilities of their new product "hechthout" (a type of plywood). The Valk has been a resounding success over many years. Adding the later polyester versions ("Polyvalk"), this boat is now probably the most popular open sailboat on the Dutch waters.

Ricus van de Stadt later designed a seaworthy race version of the Valk for Kees Bruynzeel, the Zeevalk. In 1952 this boat would come first in her class and second overall in the Fastnet race.

The Pioneer followed in 1958, a 9-metre-long sailboat with the then relative new material polyester. The design was a great success. The light boat won many international matches.

The hull lines for the first maxi yacht came from Ricus van de Stadt's drawing board. The 70-foot ocean racer Stormvogel emerged in 1960.

A few other boats that Ricus van de Stadt designed are the Voortrekker, Efsix, Stern (One Design dinghy class), Spanker (the name was used for both '19' and '42' -feet loa- designs), Randmeer and Wibo. From the open-decked Randmeer was to follow the Trotter the next year (in 1963; with a small cabin), and the Trotter-Pandora in 1967 (with more freeboard). In turn, this was to evolve to the Pandora (Mk1) in 1968, the Pandora International in 1973 and the Pandora 700 in 1976. The Prospect 900 was designed circa 1975, and many other yacht designs began on his drawing board. Key to the designs of Van de Stadt are their daring design, simplicity and good sailing.

From 1973, the Van de Stadt company fully concentrated on design after it sold the yard to Dehler. The name was changed to EG van de Stadt & Partners. Ricus continued working there until 1978. The design team now works using the name Van De Stadt Design, and is still led by Cees van Tongeren who started working for Ricus in the late 1960s.

Sailboatdata.com lists a total of 150 yachts designed by E.G. van de Stadt.

== Designs ==
- Alize 20
- DB-1
- DB-2
- Dehler 22
- Dehlya 22
- Dehler 25
- Dehlya 25
- ETAP 20
- ETAP 22
- ETAP 28
- Jeanneau Storm
