= Jeanneau Storm =

Sailboat class

Development
- Designer: E. G. van de Stadt
- Location: France
- Year: 1966
- Builder: Jeanneau
- Role: Cruiser-Racer
- Name: Jeanneau Storm

Boat
- Displacement: 3,527 lb (1,600 kg)
- Draft: 6.07 ft (1.85 m) with centerboard down

Hull
- Type: monohull
- Construction: fiberglass
- LOA: 27.23 ft (8.30 m)
- LWL: 21.49 ft (6.55 m)
- Beam: 8.20 ft (2.50 m)

Hull appendages
- Keel: stub keel with centerboard
- Ballast: 1,323 lb (600 kg)
- Rudder: transom-mounted rudder

Rig
- Rig type: Bermuda rig

Sails
- Sailplan: masthead sloop
- Total sail area: 336.00 sq ft (31.215 m^{2})

The Jeanneau Storm is a French trailerable sailboat that was designed by E. G. van de Stadt as a cruiser-racer and first built in 1966.

== Production ==
The design was built by Jeanneau in France, starting in 1966, but it is now out of production.

== Design ==
The Storm is a recreational keelboat, built predominantly of fiberglass. It has a masthead sloop rig, a raked stem, a slightly angled transom, a transom-hung rudder controlled by a wheel and a fixed stub keel, with a retractable centerboard. It displaces 3,527 lb (1,600 kg) and carries 1,323 lb (600 kg) of ballast.

The boat has a draft of 6.07 ft (1.85 m) with the centerboard extended and 2.46 ft (0.75 m) with it retracted, allowing operation in shallow water or ground transportation on a trailer.

The design has sleeping accommodation for six people, with a double "V"-berth in the bow cabin, two straight settees in the main cabin and two aft quarter berths. The galley is located on the port side at the companionway ladder. The galley is equipped with a two-burner stove. The head is located just aft of the bow cabin on the starboard side. The fresh water tank has a capacity of 18 U.S. gallons (68 L; 15 imp gal).

The design has a hull speed of 6.21 kn (11.50 km/h).

== See also ==
- List of sailing boat types
