= Dehler 22 =

Sailboat class

Development
- Designer: E. G. van de Stadt
- Location: West Germany
- Year: 1983
- Builder: Dehler Yachts

Boat
- Displacement: 1,980 lb (898 kg)
- Draft: 4.00 ft (1.22 m) with the keel down

Hull
- Type: monohull
- Construction: fiberglass
- LOA: 21.65 ft (6.60 m)
- LWL: 18.05 ft (5.50 m)
- Beam: 7.87 ft (2.40 m)
- Engine: outboard motor

Hull appendages
- Keel: lifting keel
- Ballast: 880 lb (399 kg)
- Rudder: internally-mounted spade-type rudder

Rig
- Rig type: Bermuda rig
- I foretriangle height: 23.80 ft (7.25 m)
- J foretriangle base: 7.00 ft (2.13 m)
- P mainsail luff: 25.90 ft (7.89 m)
- E mainsail foot: 9.80 ft (2.99 m)

Sails
- Sailplan: fractional rigged sloop
- Mainsail area: 126.91 sq ft (11.790 m^{2})
- Jib/genoa area: 83.30 sq ft (7.739 m^{2})
- Total sail area: 210.21 sq ft (19.529 m^{2})

Racing
- PHRF: 225

The Dehler 22 is a West German trailerable sailboat that was designed by E. G. van de Stadt and first built in 1983. It is van de Stadt's design number 374.

A kit version for amateur completion, was marketed as the Dehlya 22.

== Production ==
The design was built by Dehler Yachts in West Germany from 1983 to 1987, but it is now out of production.

== Design ==
The Dehler 22 is a recreational keelboat, built predominantly of fiberglass, with wood trim. It has a fractional sloop rig; a raked stem; an open, walk-through reverse transom with a gate; an internally mounted spade-type rudder controlled by a tiller and a fixed fin keel or stub keel with a swing keel. It displaces 1,980 lb (898 kg) and carries 440 lb (200 kg) of lead ballast and 440 lb (200 kg) of flooding water ballast. The water ballast is drained, making the boat lighter for road transport. The lifting keel is raised and lowered by a worm gear operated from the deck by a winch handle.

The lifting keel version has a draft of 4.00 ft (1.22 m) with the centerboard extended and 1.30 ft (0.40 m) with it retracted, allowing operation in shallow water or ground transportation on a trailer.

The boat is normally fitted with a small 4 to 6 hp (3 to 4 kW) outboard motor for docking and maneuvering, on a vertical sliding mount.

The design has sleeping accommodation for four people, with a double "V"-berth in the bow cabin and two straight settees quarter berths in the main cabin. The galley is a slide out unit, located under the companionway ladder. The galley is equipped with a two-burner stove and a sink. The head is located in the bow cabin, under the "V"-berth. Cabin headroom is 51 in (130 cm).

The design has a PHRF racing average handicap of 225 and a hull speed of 5.8 kn (10.7 km/h).

== Operational history ==
In a 2010 review Steve Henkel wrote, "compare this design to the Sirius 21 and 22 ... by the same designer. All have a number of high-quality features. All are well-finished and good looking, and are among our favorites in this size range. Best features: Clever and unusual features (of which some were optional) include an outboard motor which slides up and down the transom to reduce drag under sail; a combination of lifting keel and water ballast tank (440 pounds of water, 440 pounds of lead shot in the lifting keel) to keep towing weight low; a worm-drive operated on deck with a standard winch handle to raise and lower the keel; easily removable rudder; floating slipway trolley that rides piggyback on a roll-on, roll-off road trailer; extra stays to prevent mast sway at the launching site and to allow singlehanded rigging and unrigging; slide-out galley unit; opening transom gate for swimming; and availability of kits for finishing at home. Worst features: Price new was high, and remains high on resale."

== See also ==
- List of sailing boat types
