= Hanse (yacht brand) =

German yacht brand

- Current owner: HanseYachts AG
- Produced by: HanseYachts AG
- Country: Germany
- Website: www.hanseyachts.com

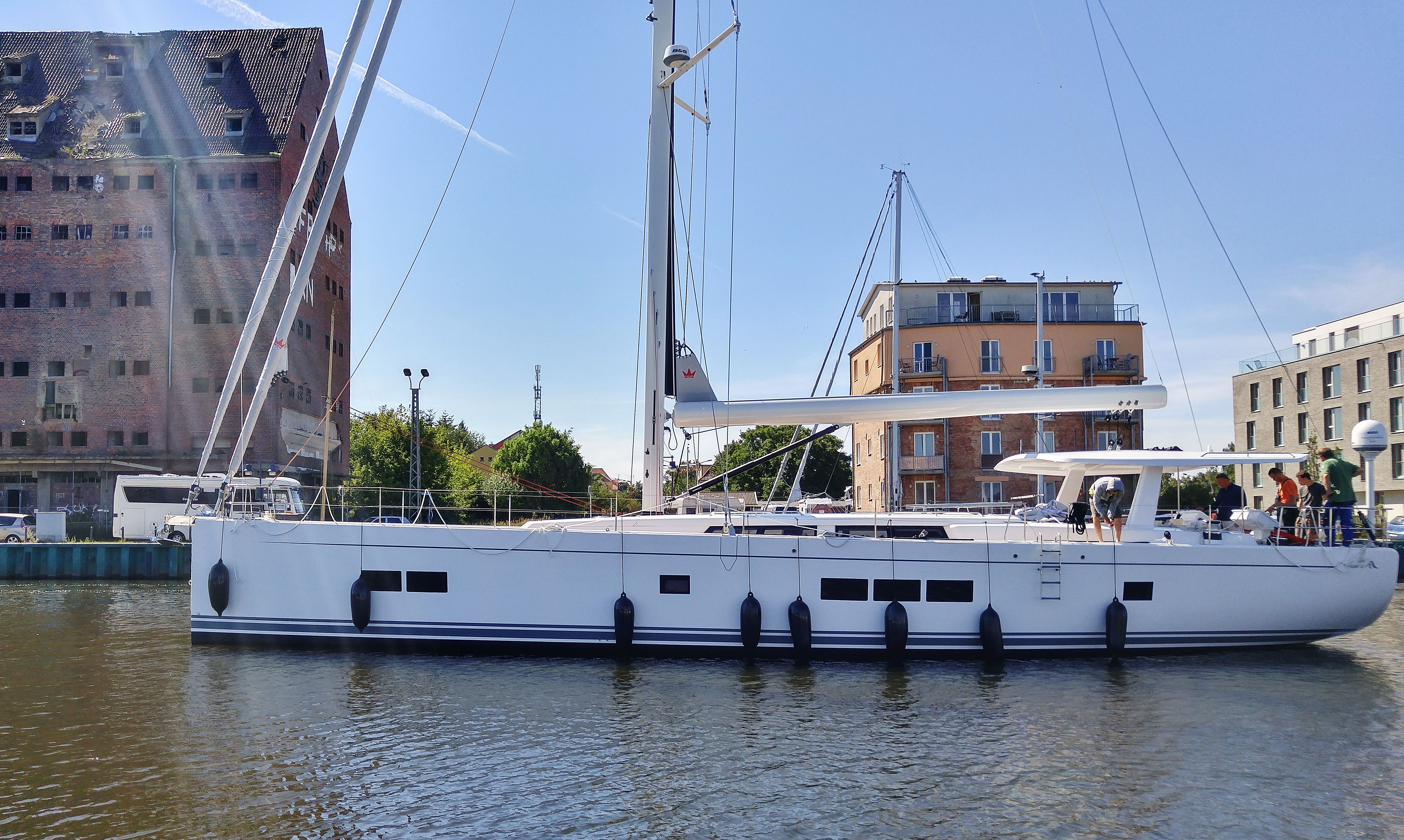
Hanse 675, launched in 2016

Hanse is a brand of sailing yachts that was created by Michael Schmidt in 1993. It is the core brand of German yacht manufacturer HanseYachts, Greifswald. The current range comprises 9 models from 32 to 69 ft in length. Naval architect for all models since 1999 was the German yacht design studio Judel/Vrolijk & Co, Bremerhaven. In 2021, the French designers Berret-Racoupeau followed in this footsteps with their first Hanse model 460.

== Current models (specs) ==
Weights and measures (metric)

Model	Launch	Length o.a. (m)	Beam (m)	Draught (m)	Displ.^{1} (t)	Air draught (m)	Sail area^{1} (sq m)	SA/D^{2} stand.
Hanse 315	2015	9.62	3.35	1.35 / 1.85	5.1	14.35	46.0	3.9
Hanse 348	2018	10.40	3.55	1.55 / 1.95	6.6	16.25	55.9	3.9
Hanse 388	2017	11.40	3.90	1.62 / 2.06	8.3	17.60	69.0	4.1
Hanse 418	2017	12.40	4.17	1.74 / 2.07	10.1	19.60	86.8	4.3
Hanse 460	2021	14.60	4.79	1.75 / 2.25	12.6	21.90	106.0	4.4
Hanse 508	2018	15.55	4.75	1.98 / 2.40	14.7	22.05	117.8	4.4
Hanse 548	2017	16.22	5.05	2.20 / 2.55 / 2.80	19.6	24.70	136.1	4.3
Hanse 588	2016	17.20	5.20	2.25 / 2.60 / 2.85	22.8	25.85	156.8	4.4
Hanse 675	2016	21.10	5.90	2.70 / 3.10	37.1	31.95	246.7	4.7

^{1} Standard version, ^{2} Sail area to displacement ratio (standard version)

Weights and measures (imperial)

Model	Launch	Length o.a. (ft)	Beam (ft)	Draught (ft)	Displ.^{1} (lbs)	Air draught (ft)	Sail area^{1} (sq ft)	SA/D^{2} stand.
Hanse 315	2015	31′ 7″	10′ 12″	4' 5″ / 6′ 1″	11,200	47′ 1″	495	15.8
Hanse 348	2018	34′ 1″	11′ 8″	5′ 1″ / 6′ 5″	14,500	53′ 4″	602	16.2
Hanse 388	2017	37′ 5″	12′ 1″	5′ 7″ / 6′ 8″	18,200	57′ 9″	725	16.7
Hanse 418	2017	40′ 8″	13′ 8″	5′ 9″ / 6′ 9″	22,400	64′ 4″	934	18.8
Hanse 460	2021	47′ 11″	15′ 9″	5′ 9″ / 7′ 5″	27,800	71′ 10″	1,141	19.9
Hanse 508	2018	51′	15′ 7″	6′ 6″ / 7′ 10″	32,400	72′ 4″	1,268	20.0
Hanse 548	2017	53′ 3″	16′ 7″	7′ 3″ / 8′ 4″ / 9′ 2″	43,200	80′ 12″	1,485	19.0
Hanse 588	2016	56′ 5″	17′ 1″	7′ 5″ / 8′ 8″ / 9′ 4″	50,300	84′ 1″	1,688	19.8
Hanse 675	2016	69′ 3″	19′ 4″	8′ 10″ / 10′ 2″	81,800	104′ 1″	2,655	22.5

^{1} Standard version, ^{2} Sail area to displacement ratio (standard version)
