= HanseYachts =

German yacht manufacturer

HanseYachts AG

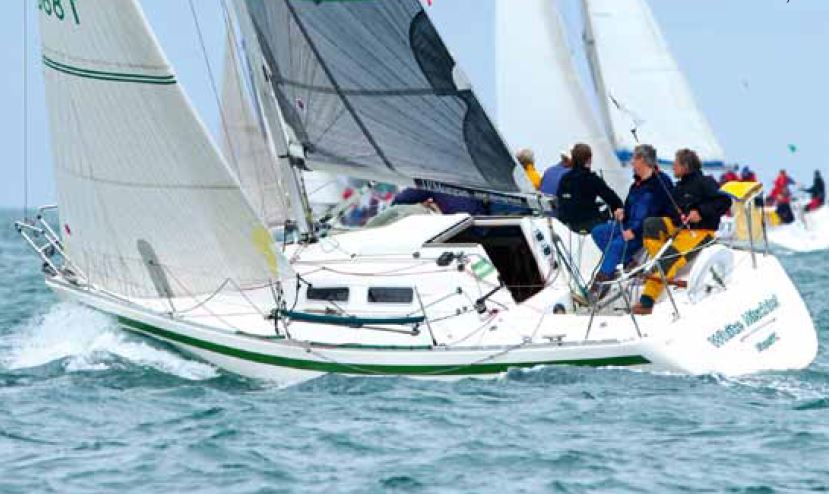
- Hanse 291 – the first model
- Type: Public
- ISIN: DE000A0KF6M8
- Industry: Boat building
- Founded: 1990
- Founder: Michael Schmidt
- Headquarters: Greifswald, Germany
- Area served: Europe, North America, South America, Middle East, Arabia, Asia, Australia, New Zealand
- Key people: Holger Passauer (Executive Board)
- Products: sailing yachts motor yachts
- Owner: Aurelius SE (79.5 %); Vesting Holding AG (5.9 %)
- Number of employees: 1,370 (2021/22)
- Subsidiaries: HanseYachts Sp. z o.o., Goleniów, Poland
- Website: www.hanseyachtsag.com status: October 2022

HanseYachts AG is a German yacht manufacturer headquartered in the city of Greifswald (Baltic Sea). The company is one of the world's largest manufacturers of sailing yachts with lengths of 29 ft (ca. 9 meters) to 67 ft (20.42 meters). The company offers monohull sailboats under the Hanse, Dehler and Moody brands. Motorboats are sold under the Fjord and Sealine brands. HanseYachts is cooperating with the yacht designers Patrick Banfield, Berret-Racoupeau, Bill Dixon and Judel/Vrolijk & Co.

HanseYachts offers several different products. Different types of yachts are offered under each brand. The expansion of the product portfolio is part of the Group's strategy, and the entire portfolio now comprises 40 different models. The Group's sales companies are located in Germany and the United States, and their products are sold by a worldwide network of around 230 dealers. Boats are manufactured only upon customer request.

== Corporate affairs ==
HanseYachts AG is the parent company of the HanseYachts Group. It performs central holding company functions and manages most of the operating business of the Group. HanseYachts AG holds 100 % of the equity in nearly all subsidiaries, either directly or indirectly. The subsidiaries are Hanse (Deutschland) Vertriebs GmbH & Co. KG, Verwaltung Hanse (Deutschland) Vertriebs GmbH, HanseYachts Marken Portfolio AG & Co. KG, Moody Yachts GmbH, Dehler Yachts GmbH, Sealine Yachts GmbH, Hanse Yachts US, LLC, USA, HanseYachts Sp. z o.o. in Poland (known as Technologie Tworzyw Sztucznych Sp. z o.o., or “TTS” for short, until 3 October 2022) with its subsidiary Balticdesign Institut Sp. z o.o., and Yachtzentrum Greifswald Beteiligungs-GmbH with its no longer operationally active subsidiary Mediterranean Yacht Service Center SARL, France.

Effective 17 October 2022, HanseYachts AG sold its equity interest in Privilege Marine as a portfolio optimization step. The French catamaran manufacturer based in Port Olona, Les Sables d'Olonne, France, was purchased by a consortium headed by the related person and longtime CEO Gilles Wagner, along with a group of the company's customers.

One of the world's oldest catamaran brands, Privilege builds ocean-going luxury catamarans sold at prices of €1.5 million to €5 million. The company had been acquired by HanseYachts AG in June 2019, but remained operationally autonomous. Since the acquisition, the entire product line was completely renewed with great market success. Because the anticipated synergy effects did not materialize to the hoped-for extent, HanseYachts sold the company and can now focus on its remaining six brands.

The HanseYachts Group is included in the consolidated financial statements of AURELIUS Equity Opportunities SE & Co. KGaA, Grunwald.

HanseYachts AG has been listed in the General Standard section of the Frankfurt Stock Exchange since 2007.

== History ==
=== Founding, rise, IPO (1990–2007) ===
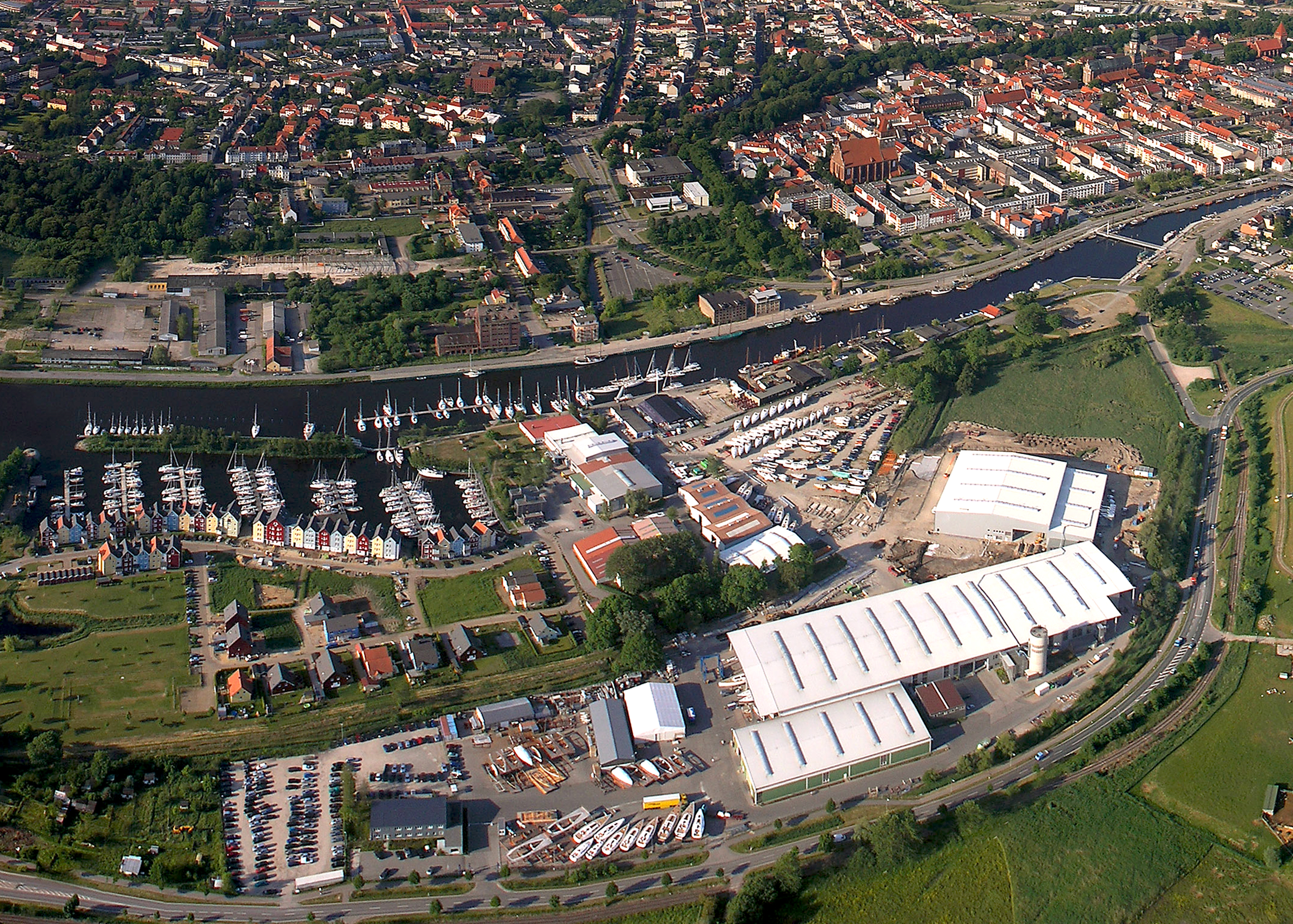
HanseYachts yard, Greifswald

HanseYachts is originated in an old-established shipyard for fishing cutters and other workboats. The today's company was founded in 1990 – after the fall of the Iron Curtain – by Michael Schmidt, the winner of the 1985 Admiral's Cup. At the beginning, Yachtzentrum Greifswald – so the former name of HanseYachts – focused on yacht refit and other services. The first model Hanse 291 (which based on the design of the Aphrodite 291) was launched in 1993. In the years to come, the company successively extended the model range and grew rapidly. In the late 1990s, HanseYachts and the yacht designers Judel/Vrolijk & Co started their still existing collaboration. In 2003, the range comprised eight models up to 53 ft. In 2007, HanseYachts AG went public (General Standard, Frankfurt). Founder Michael Schmidt remained majority shareholder.

=== Brand acquisitions and powerboat market entry (2006–2009) ===
For more than a decade, HanseYachts built sailing yachts only. In 2006, the company acquired the majority of Norwegian powerboat manufacturer Fjord Boats AS and started to develop seagoing powerboats. In 2007, the English Moody brand (sailing yachts) was added, and the creation of a new Moody range with decksaloon and aftcockpit models began. Furthermore, HanseYachts bought the remaining shares in Fjord Boats AS and introduced a first new Fjord model (Fjord 40 open). In 2008, the company completed the enlargement of its plant in Greifswald and the construction of a new production facility in Goleniów. In 2009, HanseYachts purchased its German competitor Dehler Yachtbau comprising the Dehler and Varianta brands as well as a production facility located in Freienohl, Germany.

=== Great Recession, change of ownership and recovery (2008–2016) ===
During the Great Recession, the boating industry was affected by a slump in global sales. The company's turnover dropped by 57% within one year. A period of high losses began. In 2011, founder Michael Schmidt sold his stake to German Investment holding Aurelius SE, Munich, and left the company. At the end of 2012, HanseYachts closed the Dehler factory in Freienohl and relocated the entire Dehler production to its lamination factory in Goleniów and its main factory in Greifswald. In 2013, HanseYachts parent company Aurelius SE purchased the English Sealine brand (motor yachts) together with plans, moulds, parts lists and equipment. In 2014, HanseYachts started to produce Sealine yachts.

== Current models ==
=== Sailing yachts ===
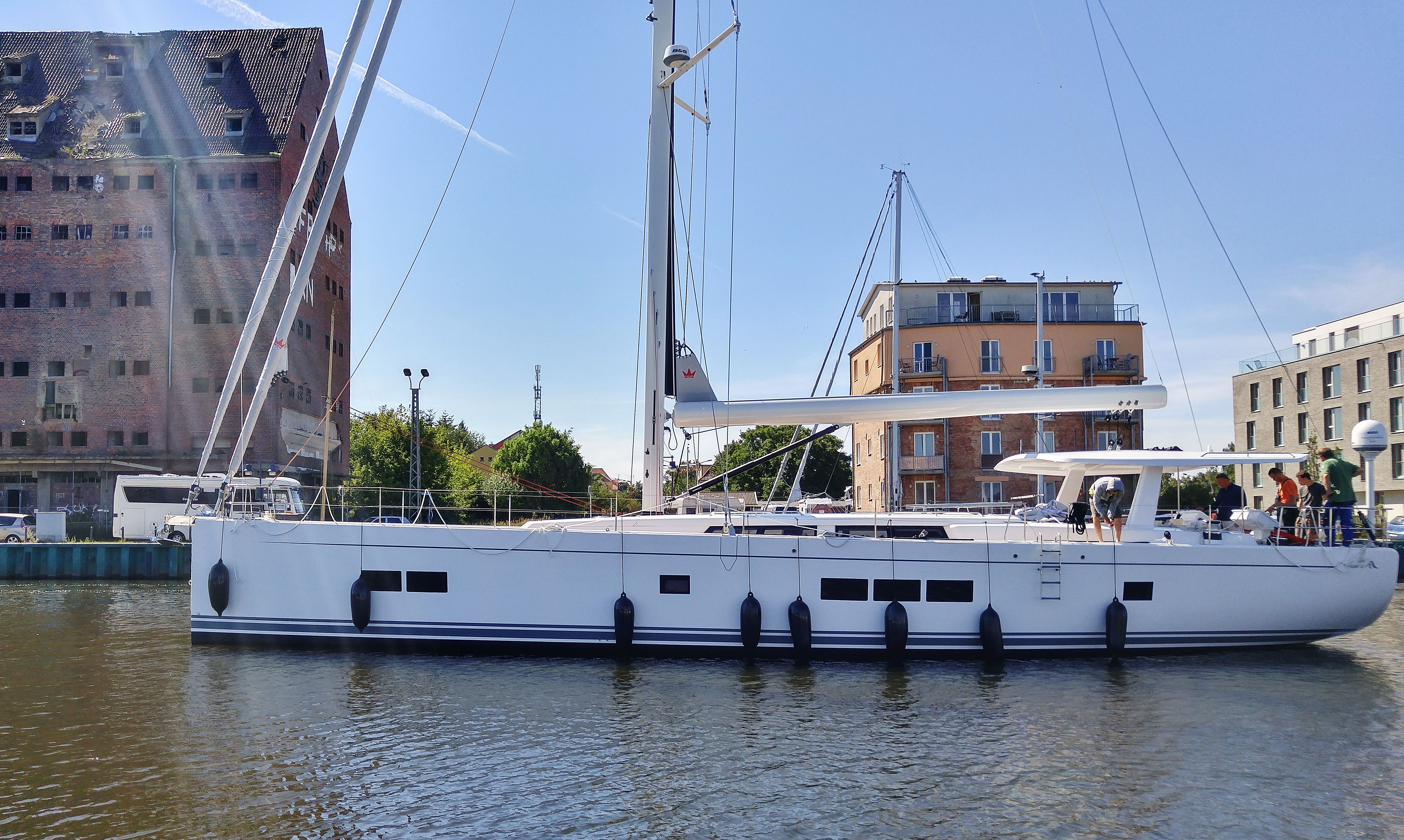
Hanse 675

Model	Launch	Model	Launch	Model	Launch
Hanse 315	2015	Dehler 29	2010	Moody 41 AC	2009
Hanse 348	2018	Dehler 30 od ^{1}	2019	Moody 41 DS	2020
Hanse 388	2017	Dehler 34	2016	Moody 45 DS	2008
Hanse 418	2017	Dehler 38 SQ	2020	Moody 54 DS	2014
Hanse 460	2021	Dehler 42	2016		
Hanse 510	2022	Dehler 46 SQ	2022		
Hanse 548	2017				
Hanse 588	2016				
Hanse 675	2016				
Hanse 510	2022				

^{1} one design class
Naval architects: Berret-Racoupeau (Hanse), Judel/Vrolijk & Co (Hanse, Dehler), Bill Dixon (Moody)

=== Motor yachts ===
Model	Launch	Model	Launch	Model	Launch
Sealine S335	2022	Fjord 38 open	2019	Ryck 280 ^{1}	2021
Sealine S335v	2022	Fjord 38 xpress ^{1}	2018		
Sealine C335	2021	Fjord 41 XL	2020		
Sealine C335v ^{1}	2021	Fjord 44 open	2018		
Sealine S390	2021	Fjord 44 coupé	2018		
Sealine C390	2019	Fjord 53 XL	2022		
Sealine C390v ^{1}	2020				
Sealine S430	2020				
Sealine C430	2017				
Sealine F430	2018				
Sealine C530	2017				
Sealine F530	2016				

^{1} model with outboard engines
Naval architects: Patrick Banfield (Fjord), Bill Dixon (Sealine, Ryck)

== Sales figures and turnover ==
Year	Sales (units)	Chg/yr.
2012/13	519	
2013/14	531	2.3 %
2014/15	499	-6.0 %
2015/16	557	11.6 %
2016/17	589	5.7 %
2017/18	564	-4.2 %
2018/19	575	2.0 %
2019/20	499	-13.2 %
2020/21	463	-7.2 %

View source data.

Sources: 2004/05 until 2020/21

== Awards ==
- "Boatbuilder of the Year 2016" (British Yachting Awards)
- "Boatbuilder of the Year 2018" (British Yachting Awards)
