= Dehler 25 =

Sailboat class

Development
- Designer: E. G. van de Stadt
- Location: West Germany
- Year: 1984
- No. built: 350
- Builder: Dehler Yachts
- Role: Cruiser
- Name: Dehler 25

Boat
- Displacement: 3,245 lb (1,472 kg)
- Draft: 4.50 ft (1.37 m)

Hull
- Type: monohull
- Construction: fiberglass
- LOA: 24.77 ft (7.55 m)
- LWL: 21.83 ft (6.65 m)
- Beam: 8.27 ft (2.52 m)
- Engine: inboard diesel engine or outboard motor

Hull appendages
- Keel: lifting keel
- Ballast: 1,488 lb (675 kg)
- Rudder: internally-mounted spade-type rudder

Rig
- Rig type: Bermuda rig
- I foretriangle height: 26.30 ft (8.02 m)
- J foretriangle base: 7.50 ft (2.29 m)
- P mainsail luff: 28.80 ft (8.78 m)
- E mainsail foot: 10.80 ft (3.29 m)

Sails
- Sailplan: fractional rigged sloop
- Mainsail area: 170 sq ft (16 m^{2})
- Jib/genoa area: 108 sq ft (10.0 m^{2})
- Spinnaker area: 360 sq ft (33 m^{2})
- Other sails: genoa: 166 sq ft (15.4 m^{2}), storm jib: 37 sq ft (3.4 m^{2})
- Upwind sail area: 336 sq ft (31.2 m^{2})
- Downwind sail area: 530 sq ft (49 m^{2})

Racing
- PHRF: 186

The Dehler 25 is a German trailerable sailboat that was designed by E. G. van de Stadt as a cruiser and first built in 1984.

A kit version for amateur completion, was marketed as the Dehlya 25.

== Production ==
The design was built by Dehler Yachts in West Germany (later Germany) between 1984 and 1995, with 350 boats completed, but it is now out of production.

== Design ==
The Dehler 25 is a recreational keelboat, built predominantly of fiberglass, with wood trim. The hull is single skin fiberglass polyester, while the deck is a balsa fiberglass polyester sandwich. It has a 7/8 fractional sloop rig, with aluminum spars, wire standing rigging, a deck-stepped mast and a single set of swept spreaders. The hull has a raked stem; a walk-through reverse transom with a gate; an internally mounted spade-type rudder controlled by a tiller and a fixed fin keel or lifting keel with a stub keel. It displaces 3,245 lb (1,472 kg). The swing keel version carries 1,654 lb (750 kg) of ballast, 827 lb (375 kg) as fixed lead ballast and 827 lb (375 kg) of flooding water ballast. The water ballast is drained for road transport. The fixed keel version has 827 lb (375 kg) of fixed ballast and no water ballast.

The fixed fin keel-equipped version of the boat has a draft of 4.33 ft (1.32 m), while the lifting keel-equipped version has a draft of 4.50 ft (1.37 m) with the keel extended and 1.30 ft (0.40 m) with it retracted, allowing operation in shallow water or ground transportation on a trailer.

The boat is fitted with a saildrive diesel engine or a small 4 to 6 hp (3 to 4 kW) outboard motor on a sliding vertical mount for docking and maneuvering. The fuel tank holds 10 U.S. gallons (38 L; 8.3 imp gal) and the fresh water tank has a capacity of 19 U.S. gallons (72 L; 16 imp gal).

For downwind sailing the boat may be fitted with a spinnaker of 360 sq ft (33 m^{2}).

The design has sleeping accommodation for four people, with a double "V"-berth in the bow cabin and two straight settee quarter berths in the main cabin. The galley is located on the starboard side just aft of the bow cabin. The galley is equipped with a two-burner stove and a sink. A navigation station is opposite the galley, on the starboard side. The head is located under the bow cabin "V"-berth. Cabin headroom is 57 in (140 cm).

The design has a PHRF racing average handicap of 186 and a hull speed of 6.3 kn (11.7 km/h).

== Operational history ==
In a 2010 review Steve Henkel wrote, "Here's something unusual: a water ballasted boat with an additional equal amount of lead ballast in a lifting keel—827 pounds in each form. That gives her a very high ballast-to-displacement ratio of 51%, and—unlike some other water ballasted boats—makes the Dehler suitably stiff. She is designed with trailering in mind, and consequently includes an automatic water ballast system, an easily removable rudder, well designed mast lowering equipment, and a specially built road trailer fitted with a four-wheeled 'floating slip-way trolley.' The heavy lifting keel is raised using a standard winch handle in a socket on deck just forward of the mast that operates a worm gear mechanism, which does the actual lifting. The boat was available either factory-finished or in various stages of construction for home finishing by using various kits and subassemblies offered as options at the factory. Best features: The Dehler is very well made and cleverly designed for easy launching and retrieval at a ramp. For example, a motor mount rides on tracks on her reverse transom for easily raising and lowering an outboard motor. She is also nicely finished. Worst features: Headroom is only 4' 9", making stays of more than a few days aboard a test of will. A canvas dodger may help in this department."

== See also ==
- List of sailing boat types
