= Alize 20 =

Sailboat class

Development
- Designer: E. G. van de Stadt
- Location: France
- Year: 1963
- No. built: 350
- Builder: Jeanneau
- Role: Day sailer-cruiser
- Name: Alize 20

Boat
- Displacement: 992 lb (450 kg)
- Draft: 3.94 ft (1.20 m) with centerboard down

Hull
- Type: monohull
- Construction: fiberglass
- LOA: 19.85 ft (6.05 m)
- LWL: 18.04 ft (5.50 m)
- Beam: 6.73 ft (2.05 m)
- Engine: outboard motor

Hull appendages
- Keel: stub keel with centerboard
- Ballast: 287 lb (130 kg)
- Rudder: transom-mounted rudder

Rig
- Rig type: Bermuda rig

Sails
- Sailplan: fractional rigged sloop
- Total sail area: 179.00 sq ft (16.630 m^{2})

The Alize 20 (English: Trade wind) is a French trailerable sailboat that was designed by E. G. van de Stadt as a day sailer and pocket cruiser, first built in 1963.

== Production ==
The boat was the first sailboat design built by Jeanneau and marked their entry into that market. The Alize 20 was constructed in France, from 1963 until 1975, with 360 boats completed.

== Design ==
The Alize 20 is a recreational keelboat, built predominantly of fiberglass, with wood trim. It has a fractional sloop rig. The hull has a raked stem, a plumb transom, a transom-hung rudder controlled by a tiller and a fixed stub keel with a retractable centerboard. It displaces 992 lb (450 kg) and carries 287 lb (130 kg) of ballast, of which 66 lb (30 kg) is the centerboard weight.

The boat has a draft of 3.94 ft (1.20 m) with the centerboard extended and 1.31 ft (0.40 m) with it retracted, allowing operation in shallow water or ground transportation on a trailer.

The design has sleeping accommodation for two people, with a double "V"-berth in the bow cabin.

For sailing downwind the design may be equipped with a symmetrical spinnaker.

The design has a hull speed of 5.69 kn (10.54 km/h).
