= Tartan Ten =

1978 one-design racing keelboat

- Class symbol

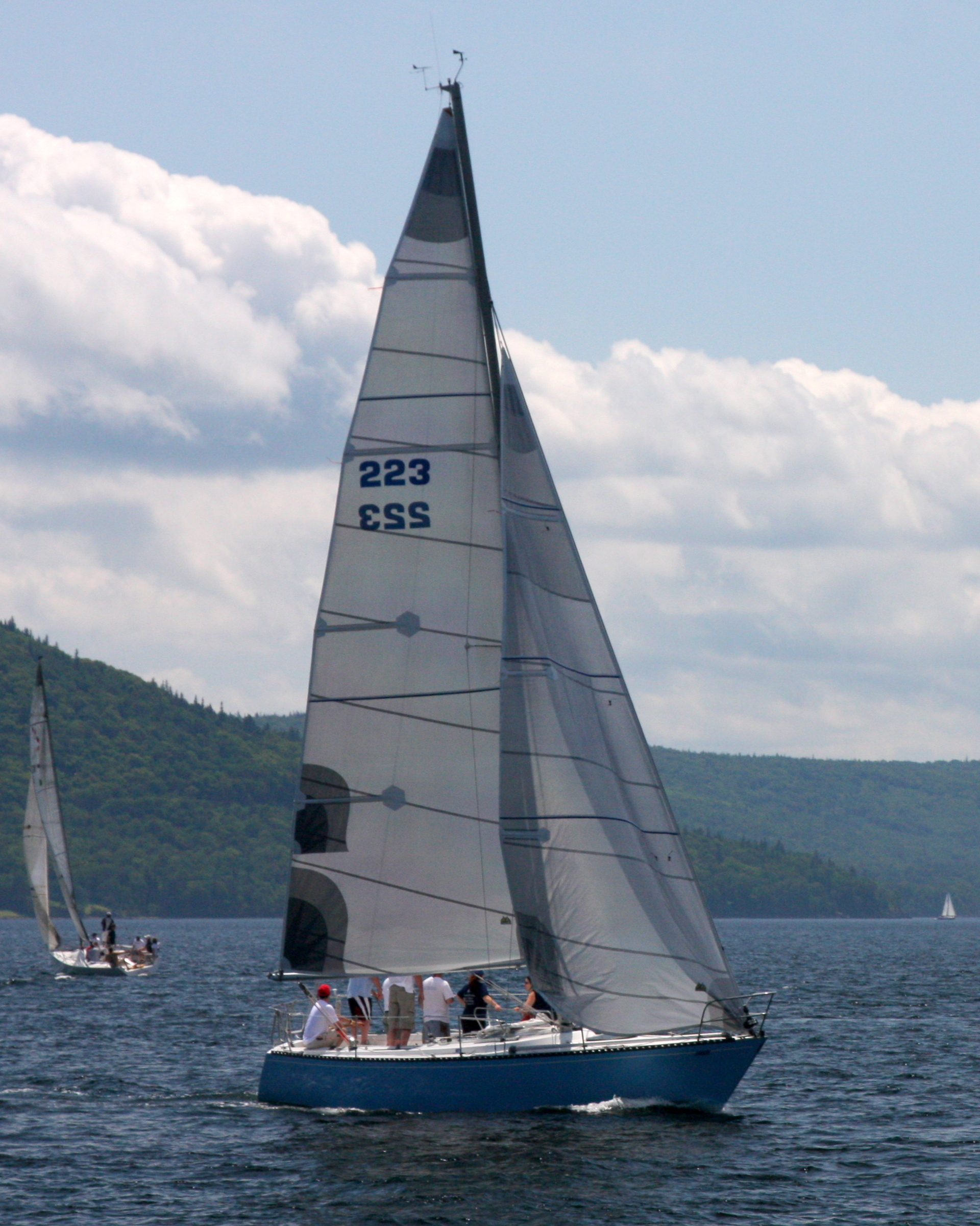

Development
- Designer: Sparkman & Stephens
- Location: United States
- Year: 1978
- No. built: 400
- Builder: Tartan Marine
- Role: One-design racer
- Name: Tartan Ten

Boat
- Displacement: 7,100 lb (3,221 kg)
- Draft: 5.83 ft (1.78 m)

Hull
- Type: Monohull
- Construction: Fiberglass
- LOA: 33.15 ft (10.10 m)
- LWL: 27.00 ft (8.23 m)
- Beam: 9.25 ft (2.82 m)
- Engine: Faryman 9 hp (7 kW) diesel engine

Hull appendages
- Keel: fin keel
- Ballast: 3,340 lb (1,515 kg)
- Rudder: internally-mounted spade-type rudder

Rig
- Rig type: Bermuda rig
- I foretriangle height: 35.00 ft (10.67 m)
- J foretriangle base: 12.00 ft (3.66 m)
- P mainsail luff: 40.25 ft (12.27 m)
- E mainsail foot: 13.75 ft (4.19 m)

Sails
- Sailplan: Fractional sloop
- Mainsail area: 276.72 sq ft (25.708 m^{2})
- Jib/genoa area: 210.00 sq ft (19.510 m^{2})
- Total sail area: 486.72 sq ft (45.218 m^{2})

Racing
- PHRF: 126 (average)

The Tartan Ten, is a one-design racing keelboat built by Tartan Marine in the United States. The company produced 400 examples between 1978 and 1988.

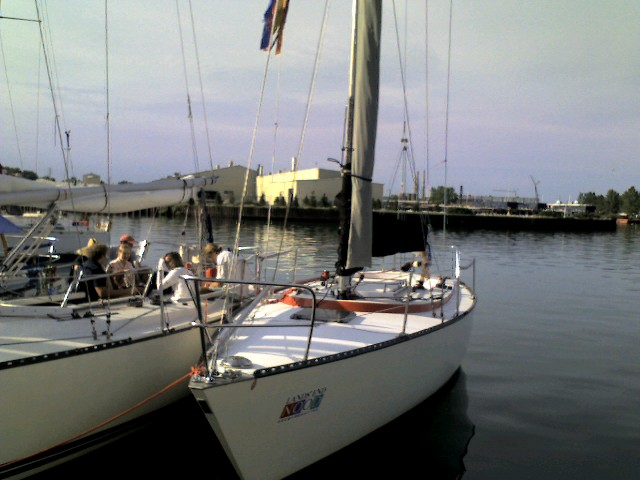
Tartan TensIt

It has a raked stem, a reverse transom, an internally mounted spade-type rudder controlled by a tiller and a fixed fin keel.

It has a 7/8 fractional sloop rig. The halyards are all internally-mounted, as is the reefing system and the 4:1 outhaul. The mast can be shaped by the shrouds and 4:1 mechanical advantage backstay. There are two jib sheet winches in the cockpit and two halyard winches on the cabin top. The boom vang has a 4:1 mechanical advantage and can also be employed as a preventer, when attached to the rail. A genoa track system was a factory option.

It has a flush deck and very little interior space. There are six berths, including a V-berth, which has the head underneath and a privacy curtain. The galley is located amidships and includes a manual pump sink and a portable ice box. The chart table doubles as a galley table. Lacking any cabin windows, ventilation is provided by a large deck hatch on the foredeck, which is also used to pass sails below for storage.

The design has a PHRF racing average handicap of 126.

It was inducted into the American Sailboat Hall of Fame in 1998.

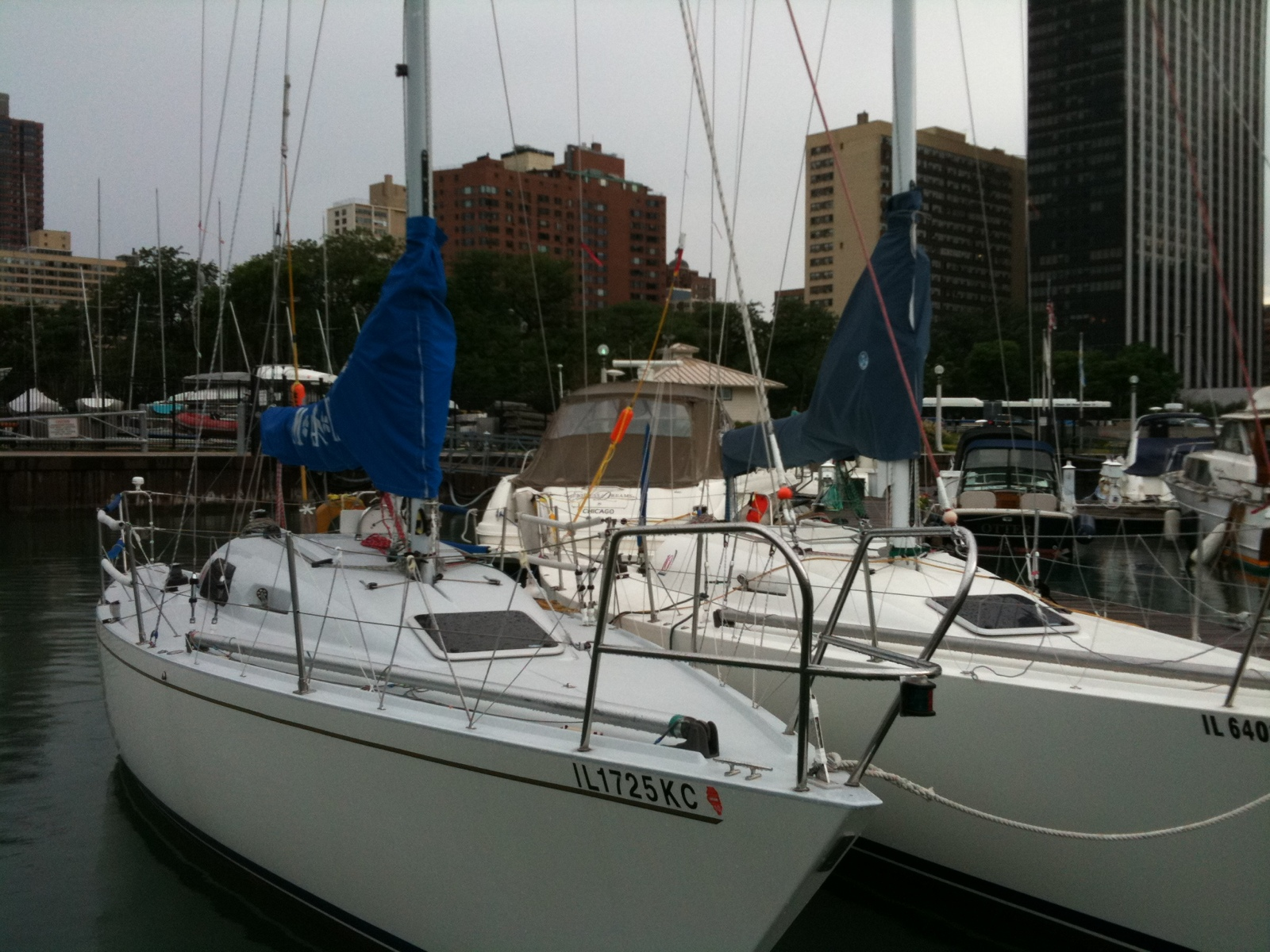
LS-10s

Southern Caribbean (SOCA) Sailboats produced an updated version of the Tartan Ten from the early-2000s until mid-2010s called the LS-10. It was built using the original hull molds and designed to conform to the Tartan Ten class rules for one-design racing, but with improved comfort, functionality and layout.
