= Hunter 33.5 =

Sailboat class

Development
- Location: United States
- Year: 1987
- Builder: Hunter Marine
- Name: Hunter 33.5

Boat
- Displacement: 11,000 lb (4,990 kg)
- Draft: 4.50 ft (1.37 m)

Hull
- Type: Monohull
- Construction: Fiberglass
- LOA: 33.33 ft (10.16 m)
- LWL: 26.83 ft (8.18 m)
- Beam: 10.92 ft (3.33 m)
- Engine: Diesel inboard motor

Hull appendages
- Keel: fin keel
- Ballast: 4,500 lb (2,041 kg)
- Rudder: internally-mounted spade-type rudder

Rig
- Rig type: B&R rig
- I foretriangle height: 39.16 ft (11.94 m)
- J foretriangle base: 11.67 ft (3.56 m)
- P mainsail luff: 43.16 ft (13.16 m)
- E mainsail foot: 13.50 ft (4.11 m)

Sails
- Sailplan: Fractional B&R rigged sloop
- Mainsail area: 291.33 sq ft (27.065 m^{2})
- Jib/genoa area: 228.50 sq ft (21.228 m^{2})
- Total sail area: 519.83 sq ft (48.294 m^{2})

Racing
- PHRF: 147 (average)

The Hunter 33.5 is an American sailboat that was designed for cruising and first built in 1987.

The Hunter 33.5 design was developed into the Moorings 335 in 1988, as a charter version for Moorings Yacht Charter.

== Production ==
The design was built by Hunter Marine in the United States, but it is now out of production.

== Design ==
The Hunter 33.5 is a recreational keelboat, built predominantly of fiberglass, with wood trim. It has a fractional sloop B&R rig, a raked stem, a walk-through reverse transom, an internally-mounted spade-type rudder controlled by a wheel and a fixed fin keel. It displaces 11,000 lb (4,990 kg) and carries 4,500 lb (2,041 kg) of ballast.

The boat has a draft of 4.50 ft (1.37 m) with the standard keel fitted. It was also available with a bulb wing keel, an elliptical wing keel or a Collins tandem keel.

The boat is fitted with a diesel engine. The fuel tank holds 42 U.S. gallons (160 L; 35 imp gal) and the fresh water tank has a capacity of 56 U.S. gallons (210 L; 47 imp gal).

The design has a PHRF racing average handicap of 147 with a high of 156 and low of 141. It has a hull speed of 6.96 kn (12.89 km/h).

== Operational history ==
Yacht designer Robert Perry wrote a review of the design in 2000 for Sailing magazine. He described the boat as, "The sailplan shows this to be a handsome design with, by today's standards, moderate freeboard, short ends and a clean wedge-shaped house. Initially, I was struck by the tall fractional rig." He concluded, "The basic hull shape is pretty conservative. The stern is broad to help with sailing length, cockpit size and accommodations aft, although not necessarily in that order. I like the short bow overhang."

== See also ==
- List of sailing boat types

Related development

- Hunter 333
- Moorings 335

Similar sailboats

- Abbott 33
- Arco 33
- C&C 3/4 Ton
- C&C 33
- C&C 101
- C&C SR 33
- Cape Dory 33
- Cape Dory 330
- CS 33
- Endeavour 33
- Hans Christian 33
- Hunter 33
- Hunter 33-2004
- Hunter 336
- Hunter 340
- Marlow-Hunter 33
- Mirage 33
- Nonsuch 33
- Tanzer 10
- Viking 33
- Watkins 33
