= C&C SR 33 =

Sailboat class

SR 33
Development
- Designer: Glenn Henderson
- Location: Canada
- Year: 1992
- No. built: 13
- Builder: C&C Yachts
- Name: SR 33

Boat
- Displacement: 5,372 lb (2,437 kg)
- Draft: 7.00 ft (2.13 m) with keel down

Hull
- Type: Monohull
- Construction: Fibreglass
- LOA: 33.07 ft (10.08 m)
- LWL: 27.75 ft (8.46 m)
- Beam: 11.42 ft (3.48 m)
- Engine: Inboard motor

Hull appendages
- Keel: lifting keel
- Rudder: internally-mounted spade-type rudder

Rig
- Rig type: Bermuda rig
- I foretriangle height: 38.90 ft (11.86 m)
- J foretriangle base: 11.50 ft (3.51 m)
- P mainsail luff: 40.83 ft (12.44 m)
- E mainsail foot: 15.54 ft (4.74 m)

Sails
- Sailplan: Fractional rigged sloop
- Mainsail area: 317.25 sq ft (29.473 m^{2})
- Jib/genoa area: 223.68 sq ft (20.781 m^{2})
- Total sail area: 540.92 sq ft (50.253 m^{2})

Racing
- PHRF: 75 (average)

The C&C SR 33 is a racing sailboat that was designed by Glenn Henderson and first built in 1992.

== Production ==
The design was initially built by Henderson himself - three boats in total starting in 1992. The fourth boat was a combination build with C&C Yachts. The design and tooling was then sold to the Canadian company C&C Yachts, who built nine more. Only thirteen boats were completed in total.

== Design ==
The SR 33 is a small racing keelboat, built predominantly of fibreglass. It has a fractional sloop rig, a nearly plumb stem, a reverse transom, an internally-mounted spade-type rudder controlled by a tiller and a lifting fin keel. It displaces 5,372 lb (2,437 kg).

The boat has a draft of 7.00 ft (2.13 m) with the lifting keel extended and 3.90 ft (1.19 m) with it retracted.

The boat may be optionally fitted with an inboard motor for docking and maneuvering. The fresh water tank has a capacity of 26 U.S. gallons (98 L; 22 imp gal).

The design has a PHRF racing average handicap of 75 with a high of 81 and low of 69. It has a hull speed of 7.05 kn (13.06 km/h).

== See also ==
- List of sailing boat types

Related development

- C&C SR 21
- C&C SR 25
- C&C SR 27

Similar sailboats

- Abbott 33
- BB 10 (keelboat)
- C&C 3/4 Ton
- C&C 33
- C&C 101
- CS 33
- DB-1
- DB-2
- Endeavour 33
- Hunter 33
- Hunter 33-2004
- Hunter 33.5
- Hunter 333
- Hunter 336
- Hunter 340
- Marlow-Hunter 33
- Mirage 33
- Moorings 335
- Nonsuch 33
- San Juan 33S
- Tanzer 10
- Tartan Ten
- Viking 33
