= Mirage 33 =

Sailboat class

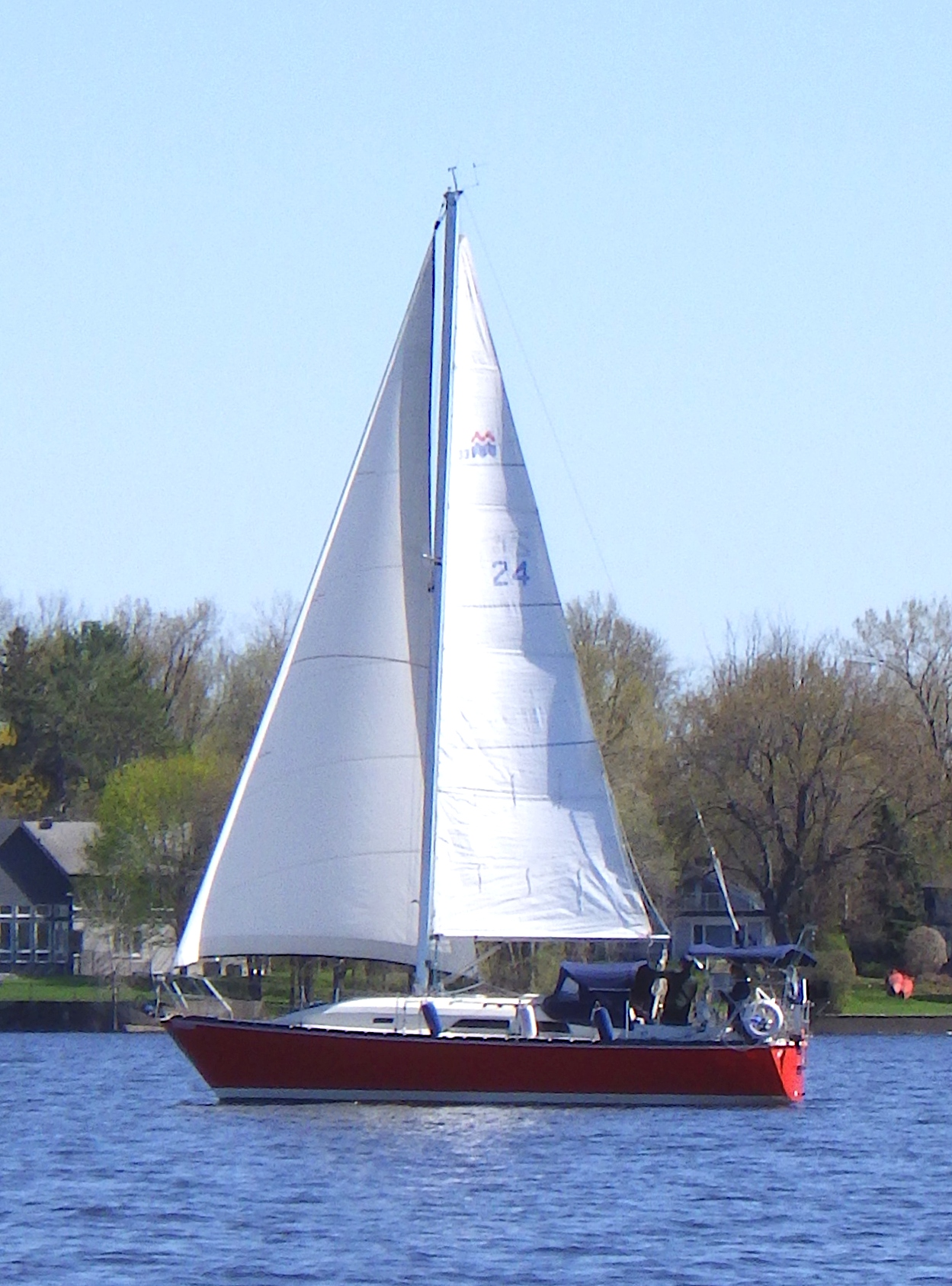

Development
- Designer: Robert Perry
- Location: Canada
- Year: 1982
- Builder: Mirage Yachts
- Name: Mirage 33

Boat
- Displacement: 9,300 lb (4,218 kg)
- Draft: 5.00 ft (1.52 m)

Hull
- Type: Monohull
- Construction: Fibreglass
- LOA: 33.50 ft (10.21 m)
- LWL: 26.75 ft (8.15 m)
- Beam: 11.67 ft (3.56 m)
- Engine: internally-mounted

Hull appendages
- Keel: fin keel
- Ballast: 3,500 lb (1,588 kg)
- Rudder: internally-mounted spade-type rudder

Rig
- General: Masthead sloop
- I foretriangle height: 42.00 ft (12.80 m)
- J foretriangle base: 13.00 ft (3.96 m)
- P mainsail luff: 35.50 ft (10.82 m)
- E mainsail foot: 11.00 ft (3.35 m)

Sails
- Mainsail area: 195.25 sq ft (18.139 m^{2})
- Jib/genoa area: 273.00 sq ft (25.363 m^{2})
- Total sail area: 468.25 sq ft (43.502 m^{2})

The Mirage 33 is a Canadian sailboat, that was designed by American Robert Perry and first built in 1982.

The Mirage 33 design was developed into the Mirage 35 in 1983, by fitting a reverse transom to the design, which adds 2.00 ft (0.61 m) to the length overall.

== Production ==
The boat was built by Mirage Yachts in Canada, but it is now out of production.

== Design ==
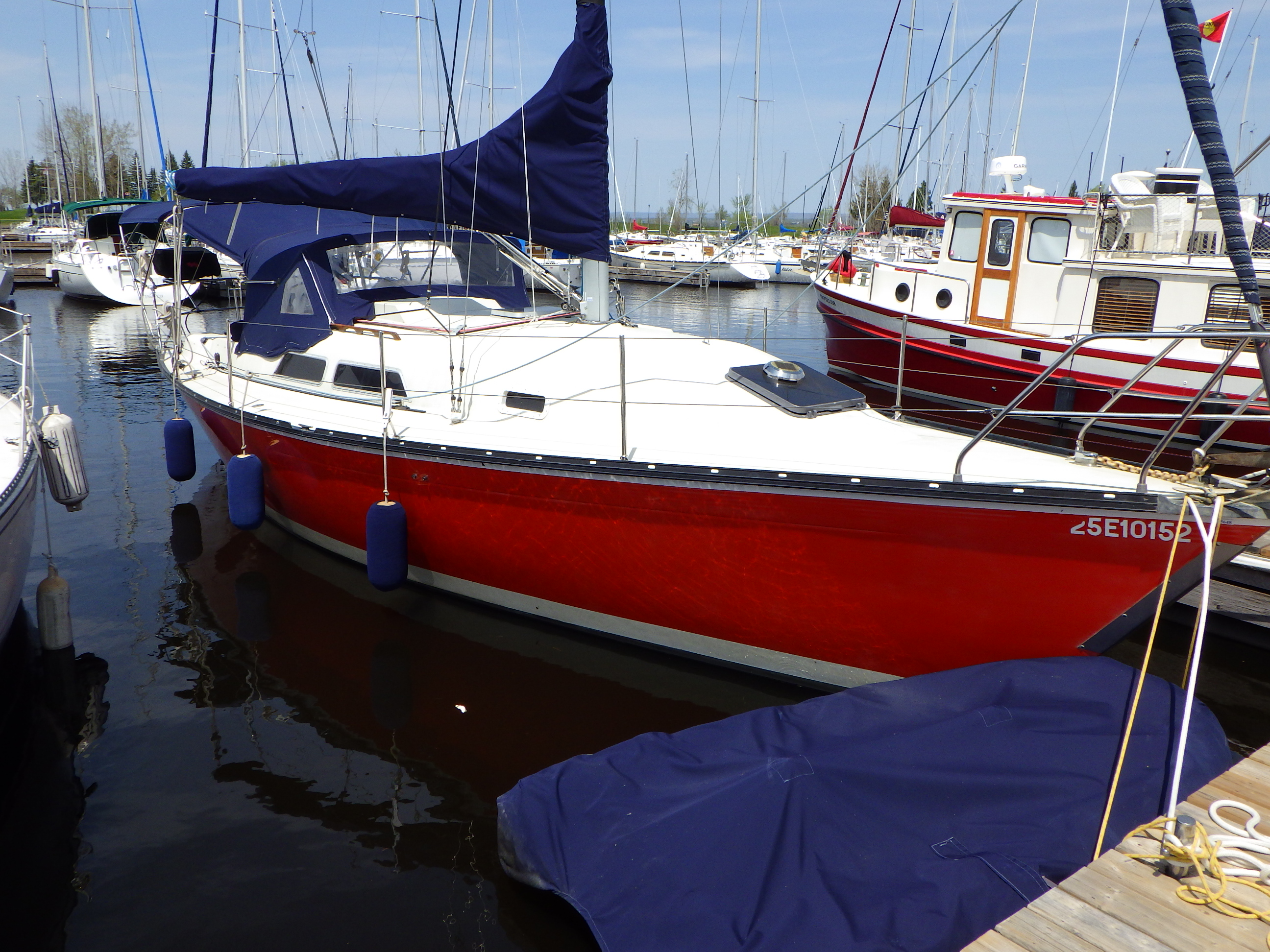
Mirage 33

The Mirage 33 is a small recreational keelboat, built predominantly of fibreglass. It has a masthead sloop rig, an internally-mounted spade-type rudder and a fixed fin keel. It displaces 9,300 lb (4,218 kg) and carries 3,500 lb (1,588 kg) of ballast.

The boat has a draft of 5.00 ft (1.52 m) with the standard keel.

The boat has a hull speed of 6.93 kn (12.83 km/h).

== See also ==
- List of sailing boat types

Related development

- Mirage 35

Similar sailboats

- Abbott 33
- Alajuela 33
- Arco 33
- C&C 3/4 Ton
- C&C 33
- C&C 101
- C&C SR 33
- Cape Dory 33
- Cape Dory 330
- CS 33
- Endeavour 33
- Hans Christian 33
- Hunter 33
- Hunter 33-2004
- Hunter 33.5
- Hunter 333
- Hunter 336
- Hunter 340
- Marlow-Hunter 33
- Moorings 335
- Nonsuch 33
- Tanzer 10
- Viking 33
- Watkins 33
