= C&C 101 =

Sailboat class

Development
- Designer: Tim Jackett
- Location: United States
- Year: 2012
- Builder: C&C Yachts
- Name: C&C 101

Boat
- Displacement: 8,100 lb (3,674 kg)
- Draft: 6.50 ft (1.98 m)

Hull
- Type: Monohull
- Construction: Fiberglass
- LOA: 32.81 ft (10.00 m)
- Beam: 10.96 ft (3.34 m)
- Engine: inboard

Hull appendages
- Keel: fin keel
- Ballast: 3,351 lb (1,520 kg)
- Rudder: internally-mounted spade-type rudder

Rig
- General: Fractional rigged sloop
- I foretriangle height: 44.75 ft (13.64 m)
- J foretriangle base: 12.50 ft (3.81 m)
- P mainsail luff: 45.00 ft (13.72 m)
- E mainsail foot: 14.83 ft (4.52 m)

Sails
- Mainsail area: 333.68 sq ft (31.000 m^{2})
- Jib/genoa area: 279.69 sq ft (25.984 m^{2})
- Total sail area: 613.36 sq ft (56.983 m^{2})

The C&C 101 is an American sailboat, that was designed by Tim Jackett and first built in 2012.

The C&C 101 was developed into the Tartan 101, another Jackett design, in 2013.

== Production ==
The boat was built by C&C Yachts in the United States, starting in 2012, but it is now out of production.

== Design ==
The C&C 101 is a small recreational keelboat, built predominantly of fiberglass. It has a fractional sloop, an internally-mounted spade-type rudder and a fixed fin keel. It displaces 8,100 lb (3,674 kg) and carries 3,351 lb (1,520 kg) of lead ballast.

The boat has a draft of 6.50 ft (1.98 m) with the standard keel fitted.

The boat is fitted with an inboard engine. Its fuel tank holds 20 U.S. gallons (76 L; 17 imp gal) and the fresh water tank has a capacity of 30 U.S. gallons (110 L; 25 imp gal).

The design has a hull speed of 7.32 kn (13.56 km/h)

== See also ==
- List of sailing boat types

Similar sailboats

- Abbott 33
- C&C 3/4 Ton
- C&C 33
- C&C SR 33
- CS 33
- Endeavour 33
- Hunter 33
- Hunter 33-2004
- Hunter 33.5
- Hunter 333
- Hunter 336
- Hunter 340
- Marlow-Hunter 33
- Moorings 335
- Nonsuch 33
- Tanzer 10
- Viking 33
