= Alajuela 33 =

Sailboat class

Development
- Designer: Raymond Richards
- Location: United States
- Year: 1977
- Builder: Alajuela Yacht Corp
- Role: Cruiser
- Name: Alajuela 33

Boat
- Displacement: 13,500 lb (6,123 kg)
- Draft: 4.75 ft (1.45 m)

Hull
- Type: Monohull
- Construction: Fiberglass
- LOA: 33.00 ft (10.06 m)
- LWL: 27.50 ft (8.38 m)
- Beam: 10.67 ft (3.25 m)
- Engine: Isuzu Pisces 27 hp (20 kW) diesel engine

Hull appendages
- Keel: fin keel
- Ballast: 4,700 lb (2,132 kg)
- Rudder: skeg-mounted rudder

Rig
- Rig type: Cutter rig
- I foretriangle height: 42.00 ft (12.80 m)
- J foretriangle base: 15.91 ft (4.85 m)
- P mainsail luff: 36.17 ft (11.02 m)
- E mainsail foot: 13.33 ft (4.06 m)

Sails
- Sailplan: Cutter rigged sloop
- Mainsail area: 241.07 sq ft (22.396 m^{2})
- Jib/genoa area: 334.11 sq ft (31.040 m^{2})
- Total sail area: 575.18 sq ft (53.436 m^{2})

The Alajuela 33 is an American sailboat that was designed by Raymond Richards for cruising and first built in 1977.

== Production ==
The design was built by the Alajuela Yacht Corp in the United States, but it is now out of production.

== Design ==
The Alajuela 33 is a recreational keelboat, built predominantly of fiberglass, with wood trim. It has a cutter rig, with aluminum spars, a spooned raked stem, a canoe transom, a skeg-mounted rudder controlled by a wheel or a tiller and a fixed fin keel. It displaces 13,500 lb (6,123 kg) and carries 4,700 lb (2,132 kg) of ballast.

The boat has a draft of 4.75 ft (1.45 m) with the standard keel fitted.

The boat is fitted with a Japanese Isuzu Pisces diesel engine of 27 hp (20 kW) for docking and maneuvering. The fuel tank holds 50 U.S. gallons (190 L; 42 imp gal) and the fresh water tank has a capacity of 75 U.S. gallons (280 L; 62 imp gal).

The design provides sleeping accommodation for six people. There is a forward "V"-berth, two main cabin settee berths and two aft quarter berths. The interior trim is teak wood, with a vinyl headliner. The galley is located on the starboard side, amidships and includes a three-burner propane-fired stove, plus an oven. The head is located amidships, on the port side, dividing the cabin into two areas, with the navigation station aft.

Ventilation is provided by two dorade vents, eight bronze-framed ports that open, plus three deck hatches.

The design has wide decks and a cockpit that incorporates seats that are 7.5 ft (229 cm) long. The cockpit lazarette provides stowage for propane bottles.

Running backstays are optional and the baby stay for the inner jib may be removed. The design has tracks for the genoa, the staysail and the spinnaker. Sheeting for the mainsail is to a cockpit-mounted traveler with a 4:1 mechanical advantage. The mainsail also has a 2:1 outhaul that is mounted internally.

== Operational history ==
In a 1994 review Richard Sherwood wrote, "there is a long keel for tracking, and the forefoot is cut away for turning. With significant sheer, this boat has a traditional look. The keel is quite thick, as it contains ballast, water, fuel, and the holding tank."

== See also ==
- List of sailing boat types

Related development

- Alajuela 38

Similar sailboats

- Abbott 33
- Arco 33
- C&C 33
- Cape Dory 33
- Cape Dory 330
- CS 33
- Endeavour 33
- Hans Christian 33
- Hunter 33
- Mirage 33
- Moorings 335
- Nonsuch 33
- Tanzer 10
- Viking 33
- Watkins 33
