= Endeavour 33 =

Sailboat class

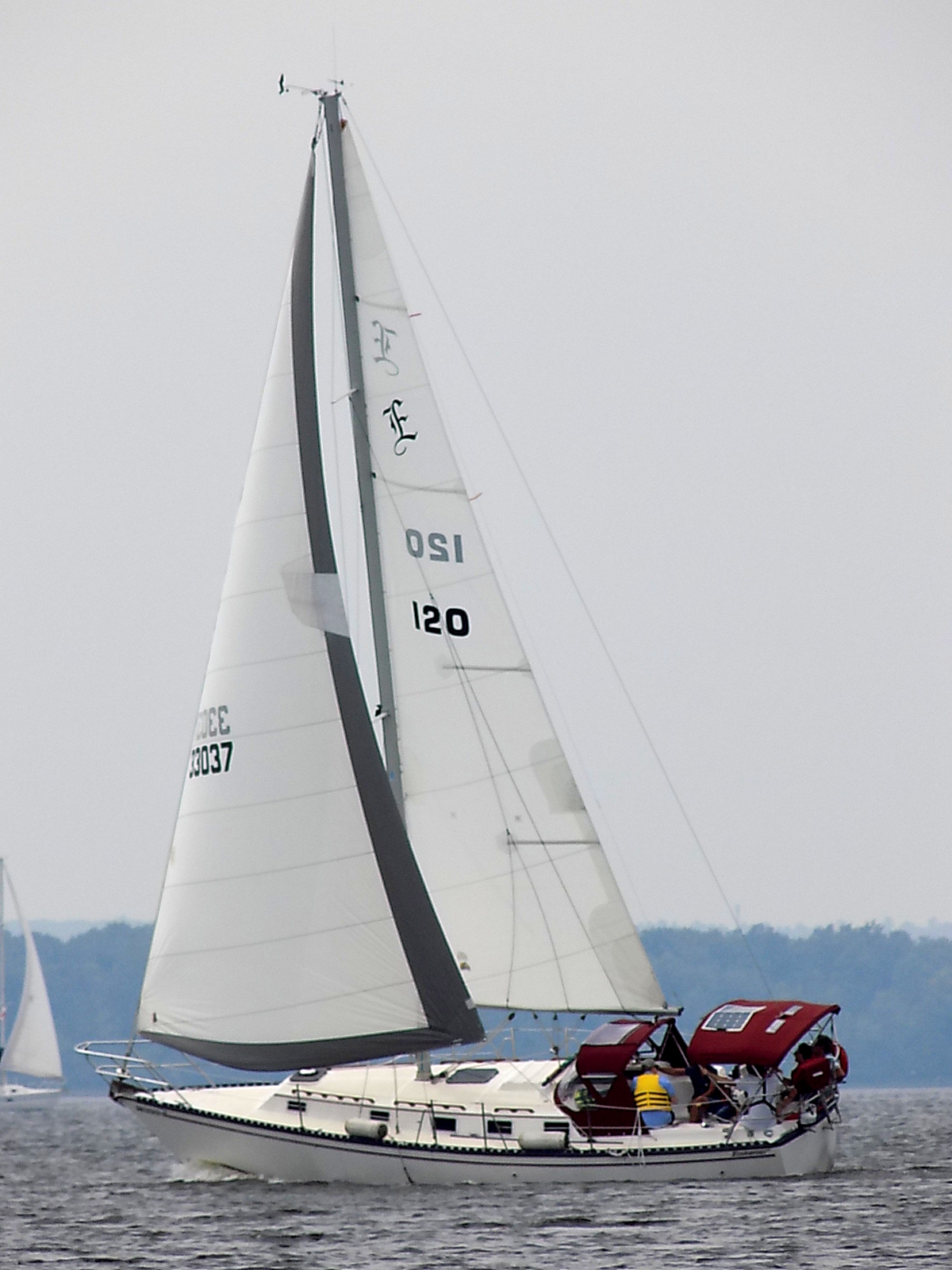

Development
- Designer: Bruce Kelley
- Location: United States
- Year: 1983
- Builder: Endeavour Yacht Corp.
- Name: Endeavour 33

Boat
- Displacement: 11,350 lb (5,148 kg)
- Draft: 4.50 ft (1.37 m)

Hull
- Type: Monohull
- Construction: Fiberglass
- LOA: 33.00 ft (10.06 m)
- LWL: 27.50 ft (8.38 m)
- Beam: 11.50 ft (3.51 m)
- Engine: Yanmar 22 hp (16 kW) diesel engine

Hull appendages
- Keel: fin keel
- Ballast: 4,600 lb (2,087 kg)
- Rudder: skeg-mounted spade-type rudder

Rig
- Rig type: Bermuda rig
- I foretriangle height: 45.00 ft (13.72 m)
- J foretriangle base: 13.82 ft (4.21 m)
- P mainsail luff: 39.00 ft (11.89 m)
- E mainsail foot: 11.72 ft (3.57 m)

Sails
- Sailplan: Masthead sloop
- Mainsail area: 228.54 sq ft (21.232 m^{2})
- Jib/genoa area: 310.95 sq ft (28.888 m^{2})
- Total sail area: 539.49 sq ft (50.120 m^{2})

Racing
- PHRF: 168 (average)

The Endeavour 33 is an American sailboat, that was designed by Bruce Kelley and first built in 1983.

== Production ==
The design was built by Endeavour Yacht Corporation in the United States between 1983 and 1986, but it is now out of production.

== Design ==
The Endeavour 33 is a small recreational keelboat, built predominantly of fiberglass, with wood trim. It has a masthead sloop rig, a raked stem, a near-vertical transom, a skeg-mounted rudder controlled by a wheel and a fixed fin keel. It displaces 11,350 lb (5,148 kg) and carries 4,600 lb (2,087 kg) of ballast.

The boat has a draft of 4.50 ft (1.37 m) with the standard keel fitted.

The boat is fitted with a Japanese Yanmar diesel engine of 22 hp (16 kW). The fuel tank holds 36 U.S. gallons (140 L; 30 imp gal) and the fresh water tank also has a capacity of 36 U.S. gallons (140 L; 30 imp gal).

The design has a PHRF racing average handicap of 168 with a high of 180 and low of 162. It has a hull speed of 7.03 kn (13.02 km/h).

== See also ==
- List of sailing boat types

Similar sailboats

- Abbott 33
- Alajuela 33
- Arco 33
- C&C 3/4 Ton
- C&C 33
- C&C 101
- C&C SR 33
- Cape Dory 33
- Cape Dory 330
- CS 33
- Hans Christian 33
- Hunter 33
- Hunter 33-2004
- Hunter 33.5
- Hunter 333
- Hunter 336
- Hunter 340
- Marlow-Hunter 33
- Mirage 33
- Moorings 335
- Nonsuch 33
- Tanzer 10
- Viking 33
- Watkins 33
