= Cape Dory 33 =

Sailboat class

Development
- Designer: Carl Alberg
- Location: United States
- Year: 1980
- No. built: 124
- Builder: Cape Dory Yachts
- Role: Cruiser
- Name: Cape Dory 33

Boat
- Displacement: 13,300 lb (6,033 kg)
- Draft: 4.83 ft (1.47 m)

Hull
- Type: Monohull
- Construction: Fiberglass
- LOA: 33.04 ft (10.07 m)
- LWL: 24.50 ft (7.47 m)
- Beam: 10.25 ft (3.12 m)
- Engine: Universal 24 hp (18 kW) diesel engine

Hull appendages
- Keel: long keel
- Ballast: 5,500 lb (2,495 kg)
- Rudder: keel-mounted rudder

Rig
- Rig type: Bermuda rig
- I foretriangle height: 43.00 ft (13.11 m)
- J foretriangle base: 13.00 ft (3.96 m)
- P mainsail luff: 37.00 ft (11.28 m)
- E mainsail foot: 14.00 ft (4.27 m)

Sails
- Sailplan: Masthead sloop
- Mainsail area: 252.00 sq ft (23.412 m^{2})
- Jib/genoa area: 279.50 sq ft (25.966 m^{2})
- Total sail area: 538.50 sq ft (50.028 m^{2})

The Cape Dory 33 is an American sailboat that was designed by Carl Alberg as a cruiser, and first built by Cape Dory Yachts in 1980.

The Cape Dory 33 design was developed into the Cape Dory 330 in 1985.

== Design ==
The Cape Dory 33 is a recreational keelboat, built predominantly of fiberglass, with a balsa-cored deck and teak wooden cockpit coamings and trim. It has a masthead sloop rig or optional cutter rig, a spooned raked stem, a raised counter transom, a keel-mounted rudder controlled by a wheel and a fixed long keel. The boat has a medium-aspect rig, and a wide beam extended well aft. Draft is 4.83 ft (1.47 m) with the standard long keel. The boat displaces 13,300 lb (6,033 kg) and carries 5,500 lb (2,495 kg) of lead ballast, equal to 42 percent of its displacement.

The mainsheet is attached to a mainsheet traveler on the bridge deck. There are five winches for the mainsail halyard, genoa halyard, jiffy reefing and the genoa sheets. Either a Universal diesel engine of 24 hp (18 kW) or a Swedish Volvo diesel engine of 23 hp (17 kW) is installed. The fuel tank holds 21 U.S. gallons (79 L; 17 imp gal) and fresh water storage is 74 U.S. gallons (280 L; 62 imp gal).

Rather than a V-berth forward, a single berth is mounted in the port side of the bow, with a seat and bureau in its cabin. The berth may be also converted into a double. In the main cabin are settee berths, including one that converts to a double and a third quarter berth in the aft main cabin, partially under the cockpit and adjoining the navigation table. The head is forward and to the port side and includes a privacy door and shower. The galley is on the port side, at the bottom of the companionway steps and includes a three-burner, alcohol-fired stove. The cabin sole is made from teak and holly.

Ventilation is provided by two opening hatches, one each above the main cabin and the bow cabin, five opening bronze ports on each side of the cabin, and dorade vents.

== Production ==
A total of 124 examples of the design were completed between 1980 and 1985, but it is now out of production.

== Operational history ==
As of 2020 the boat was supported by an active class club that organizes racing events, the Cape Dory Sailboat Owners Association.

== See also ==
- List of sailing boat types

Related development

- Cape Dory 330

Similar sailboats

- Abbott 33
- Alajuela 33
- Arco 33
- C&C 33
- CS 33
- Endeavour 33
- Hans Christian 33
- Hunter 33
- Hunter 33.5
- Mirage 33
- Nonsuch 33
- Tanzer 10
- Viking 33
- Watkins 33
