= Arco 33 =

Sailboat class

Development
- Designer: Wirth Munroe
- Location: United States
- Year: 1958
- No. built: 15
- Builder: Crystaliners Corporation (Glassco Inc.)
- Name: Arco 33

Boat
- Displacement: 12,000 lb (5,443 kg)
- Draft: 6.50 ft (1.98 m) with centerboard down

Hull
- Type: Monohull
- Construction: Fiberglass
- LOA: 33.00 ft (10.06 m)
- LWL: 23.25 ft (7.09 m)
- Beam: 9.83 ft (3.00 m)
- Engine: Palmer H-60 22 hp (16 kW) gasoline engine

Hull appendages
- Keel: stub keel with centerboard
- Rudder: keel-mounted rudder

Rig
- Rig type: Bermuda rig

Sails
- Sailplan: Fractional rigged sloop Masthead sloop
- Total sail area: 550 sq ft (51 m^{2})

The Arco 33 is an American sailboat that was designed by Wirth Munroe as a cruiser and first built in 1958. The design is noted as one of the first fiberglass production sailboats of its size built.

== Production ==
The design was built by Crystaliners Corporation (Glassco Inc.) in Miami, Florida, United States. The company completed 15 boats starting in 1958, but it is now out of production.

The Arco 33 molds were later sold to Columbia Yachts and the design was developed into the Columbia 33 Caribbean in 1963.

== Design ==
The Arco 33 is a recreational keelboat, built predominantly of fiberglass, with wood trim. It has a masthead sloop rig or optional yawl rig with the addition of a mizzen mast. Features include a spooned raked stem, a raised counter transom, a keel-mounted rudder and a fixed stub keel with a retractable centerboard. It displaces 12,000 lb (5,443 kg).

The boat has a draft of 6.50 ft (1.98 m) with the centreboard extended and 3.50 ft (1.07 m) with it retracted.

The boat is fitted with a Palmer H-60 22 hp (16 kW) gasoline engine for docking and maneuvering.

The design has a hull speed of 6.46 kn (11.96 km/h).

== See also ==
- List of sailing boat types

Related development

- Columbia 33 Caribbean

Similar sailboats

- Abbott 33
- Alajuela 33
- C&C 33
- Cape Dory 33
- Cape Dory 330
- CS 33
- Endeavour 33
- Hans Christian 33
- Hunter 33
- Hunter 33.5
- Mirage 33
- Nonsuch 33
- Tanzer 10
- Viking 33
- Watkins 33
