= Moorings 335 =

Sailboat class

Development
- Location: United States
- Year: 1988
- Builder: Hunter Marine
- Name: Moorings 335

Boat
- Displacement: 10,900 lb (4,944 kg)
- Draft: 4.50 ft (1.37 m)

Hull
- Type: Monohull
- Construction: Fiberglass
- LOA: 32.66 ft (9.95 m)
- LWL: 27.00 ft (8.23 m)
- Beam: 10.92 ft (3.33 m)
- Engine: Diesel inboard motor

Hull appendages
- Keel: fin keel
- Ballast: 4,500 lb (2,041 kg)
- Rudder: internally-mounted spade-type rudder

Rig
- Rig type: Bermuda rig

Sails
- Sailplan: Fractional rigged sloop
- Total sail area: 522.00 sq ft (48.495 m^{2})

The Moorings 335 is an American sailboat that was designed for Moorings Yacht Charter and first built in 1988.

The Moorings 335 is a development of the Hunter 33.5 specially for the charter market, with a shorter length overall, but longer waterline length and lighter displacement.

== Production ==
The design was built for Moorings by Hunter Marine in the United States, but it is now out of production. The design is no longer in service with Moorings and the fleet has been sold for private use.

== Design ==
The Moorings 335 is a recreational keelboat, built predominantly of fiberglass. It has a fractional sloop rig, an internally-mounted spade-type rudder controlled by a wheel and a fixed fin keel. It displaces 10,900 lb (4,944 kg) and carries 4,500 lb (2,041 kg) of ballast.

The boat has a draft of 4.50 ft (1.37 m) with the standard keel fitted.

The design has a hull speed of 6.96 kn (12.89 km/h).

== See also ==
- List of sailing boat types

Related development

- Hunter 33.5
- Hunter 333
- Moorings 295

Similar sailboats

- Abbott 33
- Alajuela 33
- C&C 3/4 Ton
- C&C 33
- C&C 101
- C&C SR 33
- CS 33
- Endeavour 33
- Hunter 33
- Hunter 33-2004
- Hunter 336
- Hunter 340
- Marlow-Hunter 33
- Mirage 33
- Nonsuch 33
- Tanzer 10
- Viking 33
- Watkins 33
