= Cape Dory 330 =

Sailboat class

Development
- Designer: Carl Alberg
- Location: United States
- Year: 1985
- No. built: 27
- Builder: Cape Dory Yachts
- Name: Cape Dory 330

Boat
- Displacement: 13,300 lb (6,033 kg)
- Draft: 4.83 ft (1.47 m)

Hull
- Type: Monohull
- Construction: Fiberglass
- LOA: 33.05 ft (10.07 m)
- LWL: 24.50 ft (7.47 m)
- Beam: 10.25 ft (3.12 m)
- Engine: Inboard engine

Hull appendages
- Keel: long keel
- Ballast: 5,500 lb (2,495 kg)
- Rudder: keel-mounted rudder

Rig
- Rig type: Bermuda rig
- I foretriangle height: 44.75 ft (13.64 m)
- J foretriangle base: 13.75 ft (4.19 m)
- P mainsail luff: 39.00 ft (11.89 m)
- E mainsail foot: 13.00 ft (3.96 m)

Sails
- Sailplan: Cutter rigged sloop
- Mainsail area: 253.50 sq ft (23.551 m^{2})
- Jib/genoa area: 307.66 sq ft (28.583 m^{2})
- Total sail area: 561.16 sq ft (52.133 m^{2})

The Cape Dory 330 is an American sailboat that was designed by Carl Alberg as a cruiser and first built by Cape Dory Yachts in 1985.

The Cape Dory 330 is a development of the Cape Dory 33, with a bowsprit and cutter rig, plus interior changes.

== Design ==
The Cape Dory 330 is a recreational keelboat, built predominantly of fiberglass, with wood trim. It has a cutter rig, a spooned raked stem, a bowsprit, a raised counter transom, a keel-mounted rudder controlled by a wheel and a fixed long keel. The mainsail is sheeted mid-boom to a mainsheet traveler on the cabin roof. The inner jib is self-tacking and is boom mounted. It displaces 13,300 lb (6,033 kg) and carries 5,500 lb (2,495 kg) of ballast. Designed hull speed is 6.63 kn (12.28 km/h).

The boat has a draft of 4.83 ft (1.47 m) with a standard keel and is fitted with an auxiliary inboard engine.

The galley is located on the port side at the foot of the companionway steps and includes a sink and two-burner stove. The head is forward on the starboard side and has a privacy door. Accommodations include a bow "V"-berth and two main cabin settee berths. There is a folding dinette table and a chart table in the main cabin.

== Production ==
A total of 27 examples of the type were built between 1985 and 1988, but it is now out of production.

== Operational history ==
As of 2020 the boat was supported by an active class club that organizes racing events, the Cape Dory Sailboat Owners Association.

== See also ==
- List of sailing boat types

Related development

- Cape Dory 33

Similar sailboats

- Abbott 33
- Alajuela 33
- Arco 33
- C&C 33
- CS 33
- Endeavour 33
- Hans Christian 33
- Hunter 33
- Hunter 33.5
- Mirage 33
- Nonsuch 33
- Tanzer 10
- Viking 33
- Watkins 33
