= C&C 33 =

Sailboat class

C&C 33-1
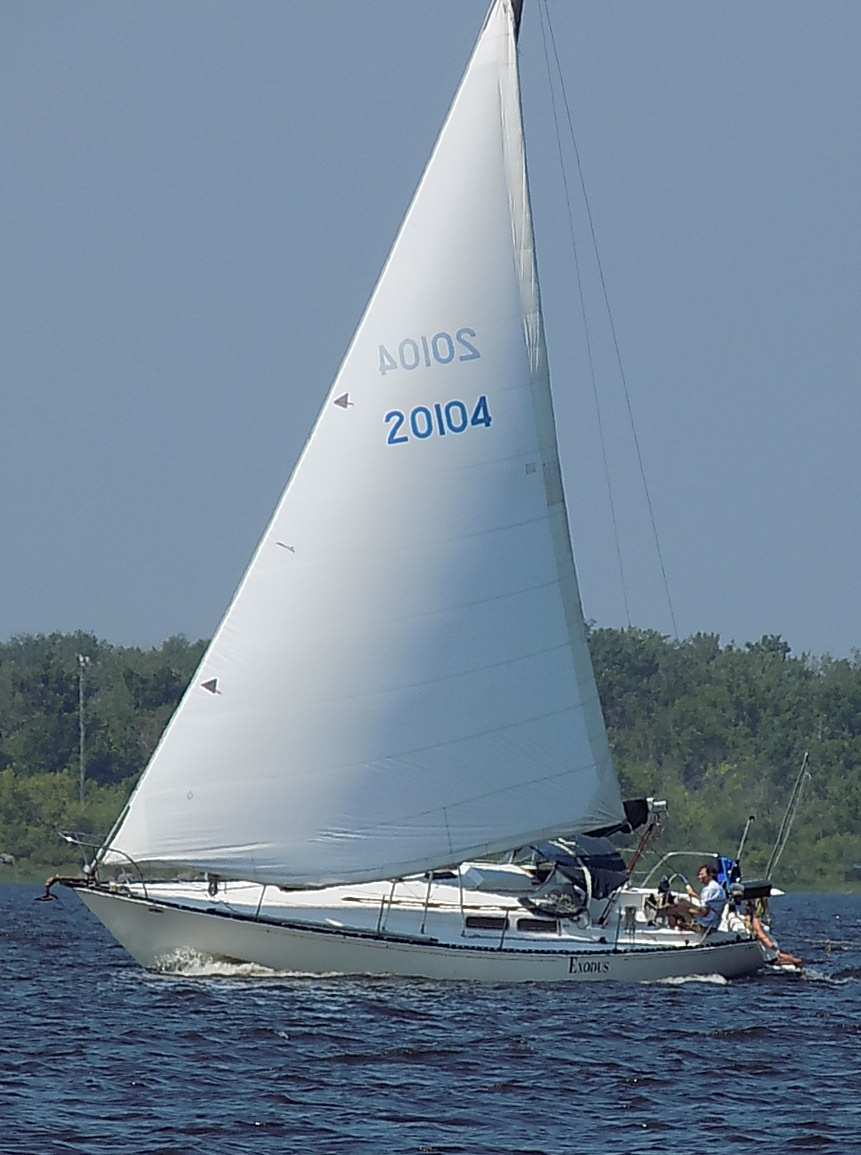
- C&C 33-1

Development
- Designer: Robert W. Ball, C&C Design
- Location: Canada
- Year: 1974
- No. built: 209
- Builder: C&C Yachts
- Name: C&C 33-1

Boat
- Displacement: 9,800 lb (4,445 kg)
- Draft: 5.50 ft (1.68 m)

Hull
- Type: Monohull
- Construction: Fibreglass
- LOA: 32.87 ft (10.02 m)
- LWL: 26.42 ft (8.05 m)
- Beam: 10.51 ft (3.20 m)
- Engine: Universal Atomic 4 30 hp (22 kW) gasoline engine

Hull appendages
- Keel: fin keel
- Ballast: 4,075 lb (1,848 kg)
- Rudder: internally-mounted spade-type rudder

Rig
- General: Masthead sloop
- I foretriangle height: 43.00 ft (13.11 m)
- J foretriangle base: 14.00 ft (4.27 m)
- P mainsail luff: 37.25 ft (11.35 m)
- E mainsail foot: 10.75 ft (3.28 m)

Sails
- Mainsail area: 200.22 sq ft (18.601 m^{2})
- Jib/genoa area: 301.00 sq ft (27.964 m^{2})
- Total sail area: 501.22 sq ft (46.565 m^{2})

The C&C 33 is a series of Canadian sailboats, that were designed by Robert W. Ball of C&C Design and first built in 1974.

The C&C 33 Mark I is a development of the C&C 3/4 Ton, which was introduced earlier in 1974.

== Production ==
The boat designs were built by C&C Yachts in Canada, but are now out of production.

== Design ==
The C&C 33 series are small recreational keelboats, built predominantly of fibreglass, with wood trim. They have masthead sloop rigs with internally-mounted spade-type rudders.

== Variants ==
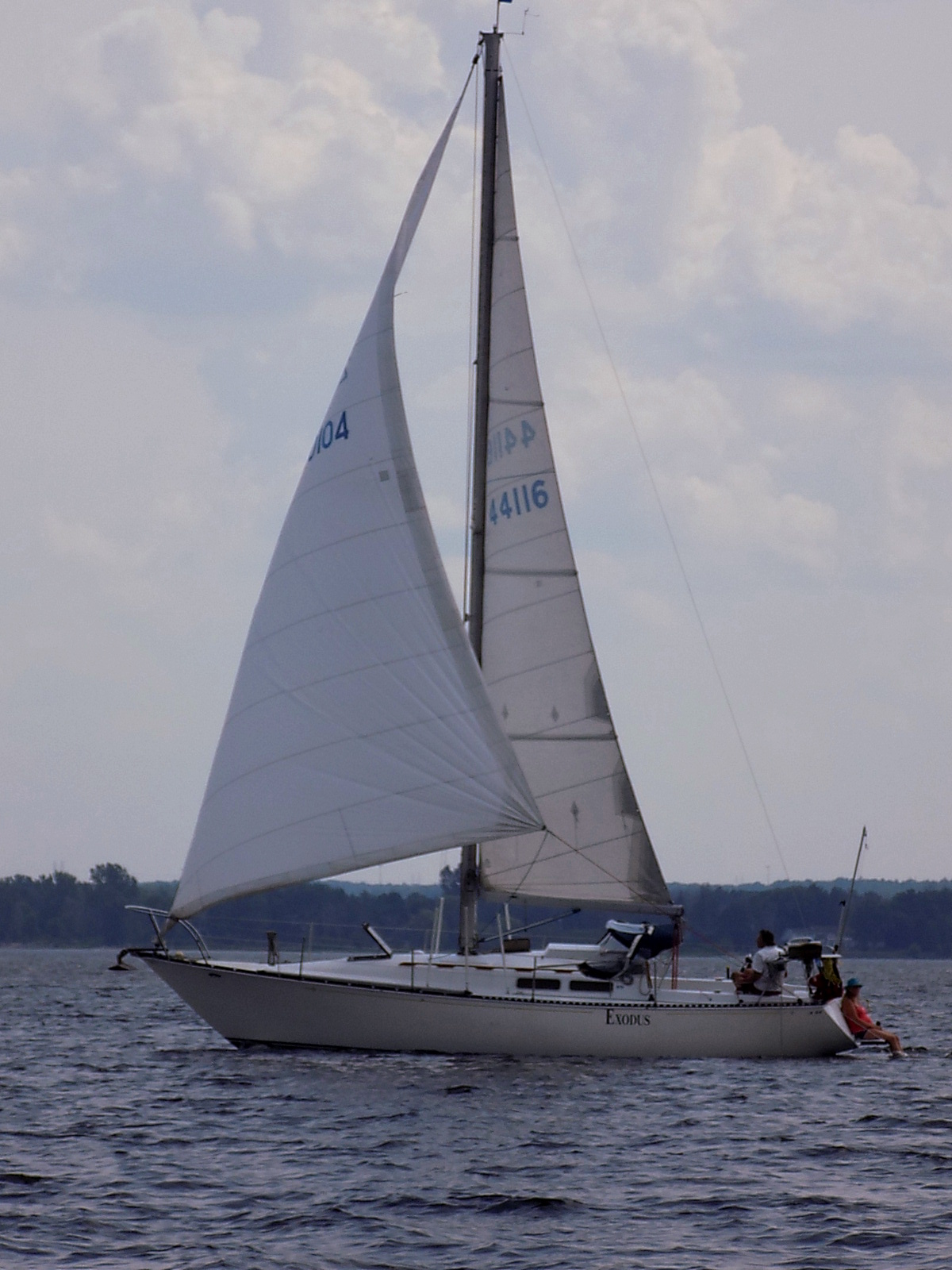
C&C 33-1

C&C 33-1 or Mark I
This model was introduced in 1974 and was produced until 1977, with 209 produced. It has a length overall of 32.87 ft (10.0 m), a waterline length of 26.42 ft (8.1 m), displaces 9,800 lb (4,445 kg) and carries 4,075 lb (1,848 kg) of lead ballast. The boat has a draft of 5.50 ft (1.68 m) with the standard keel. The boat is fitted with a Universal Atomic 4 gasoline engine of 30 hp (22 kW). The fuel tank holds 20 U.S. gallons (76 L; 17 imp gal) and the fresh water tank also has a capacity of 20 U.S. gallons (76 L; 17 imp gal). It has a hull speed of 6.89 kn (12.76 km/h).
C&C 30E
Built from 1977 until 1982 in Europe, this boat was based upon the Mark I design.
C&C 33-2 or Mark II
Smaller and lighter than the Mark I, this entirely new design was introduced in 1984 and was built until 1988, with 200 completed. It has a length overall of 32.58 ft (9.9 m), a waterline length of 26.17 ft (8.0 m), displaces 9,450 lb (4,286 kg) and carries 3,975 lb (1,803 kg) of lead ballast. The boat has a draft of 6.33 ft (1.93 m) with the standard keel and 6.5 ft (2.0 m) with the optional keel and centreboard in the down position and 4.33 ft (1.32 m) with the centreboard up. The boat is fitted with a Japanese Yanmar 2GM diesel engine of 20 hp (15 kW). The fuel tank holds 18 U.S. gallons (68 L; 15 imp gal) and the fresh water tank has a capacity of 30 U.S. gallons (110 L; 25 imp gal). The centreboard version has a PHRF racing average handicap of 150 with a high of 158 and low of 141. It has a hull speed of 6.85 kn (12.69 km/h).

== See also ==
- List of sailing boat types

Related development

- C&C 3/4 Ton

Similar sailboats

- Abbott 33
- Alajuela 33
- Arco 33
- C&C 101
- C&C SR 33
- Cape Dory 33
- Cape Dory 330
- CS 33
- Endeavour 33
- Hans Christian 33
- Hunter 33
- Hunter 33-2004
- Hunter 33.5
- Hunter 333
- Hunter 336
- Hunter 340
- Marlow-Hunter 33
- Mirage 33
- Moorings 335
- Nonsuch 33
- Tanzer 10
- Viking 33
- Watkins 33
