= Marlow-Hunter 33 =

Sailboat class

Development
- Designer: Glenn Henderson and the Hunter Design Team
- Location: United States
- Year: 2011
- Builder: Hunter Marine

Boat
- Displacement: 12,400 lb (5,625 kg)
- Draft: 5.50 ft (1.68 m)

Hull
- Type: Monohull
- Construction: Fiberglass
- LOA: 33.50 ft (10.21 m)
- LWL: 29.42 ft (8.97 m)
- Beam: 11.50 ft (3.51 m)
- Engine: Yanmar 21 or 29 hp (16 or 22 kW) diesel inboard motor

Hull appendages
- Keel: fin keel
- Ballast: 3,459 lb (1,569 kg)
- Rudder: internally-mounted spade-type rudder

Rig
- Rig type: Bermuda rig
- I foretriangle height: 37.42 ft (11.41 m)
- J foretriangle base: 10.83 ft (3.30 m)
- P mainsail luff: 36.42 ft (11.10 m)
- E mainsail foot: 13.83 ft (4.22 m)

Sails
- Sailplan: Fractional B&R rigged sloop
- Mainsail area: 251.84 sq ft (23.397 m^{2})
- Jib/genoa area: 202.63 sq ft (18.825 m^{2})
- Total sail area: 454.47 sq ft (42.222 m^{2})

The Marlow-Hunter 33 (at the time of introduction called the Hunter E33) is an American sailboat that was designed by Glenn Henderson and the Hunter Design Team and first built in 2012.

The Marlow-Hunter 33 is a development of the Hunter 33-2004.

The Marlow-Hunter 33 design was originally marketed by the manufacturer as the Hunter E33, but it can also be confused with the 1977 Hunter 33 and the 2004 model Hunter 33-2004 (also called the Hunter 33-2), both of which were also sold as the Hunter 33.

== Production ==
The design was built by Hunter Marine in the United States starting in 2011 under the designation Hunter E33. When the company became Marlow-Hunter in 2012 the design was re-designated as the Marlow-Hunter 33. It remained in production in November 2018 at a base price of US$148,998.

== Design ==
The Marlow-Hunter 33 is a recreational keelboat, built predominantly of fiberglass. It has a fractional sloop B&R rig, a nearly plumb stem, a reverse transom, an internally-mounted spade-type rudder controlled by a wheel and a fixed fin keel. It displaces 12,400 lb (5,625 kg) and carries 3,459 lb (1,569 kg) of ballast.

The Marlow-Hunter 33 uses a similar hull mold as the predecessor Hunter 33-2004, with a below waterline chine added and the same rig. The primary changes from the Hunter 33-2004 include a larger cockpit, new deck layout and new window geometry, moving from the 33-2004's three small windows of varying sizes, to three new abutting windows in an arched shape, plus the addition of a fold down swim platform on the transom.

The boat has a draft of 5.50 ft (1.68 m) with the standard keel and 4.5 ft (1.4 m) with the optional shoal draft keel.

The boat is fitted with a Japanese Yanmar inboard engine diesel engine of 21 hp (16 kW), with a 29 hp (22 kW) engine optional. The fuel tank holds 25 U.S. gallons (95 L; 21 imp gal) and the fresh water tank has a capacity of 50 U.S. gallons (190 L; 42 imp gal). The water/toilet holding tank has a capacity of 15 U.S. gallons (57 L; 12 imp gal).

== Operational history ==
At its introduction in 2011, the design was named Cruising World's "Best Compact Cruiser" of the year. The winning details noted included that it meets its mission statement as an "affordable, introductory family coastal cruiser." Other items praised include the "tremendous attention to detail in hardware selection and A.B.Y.C. standards compliance" and that the "smart and effective layouts grace the cockpit, the side decks, and the interior space".

In 2012 Cruising World reviewer Alvah Simon wrote, "The innovations and improvements found in the new and completely revamped Hunter 33 aren’t mere window dressing; they’re genuine leaps forward in speed, handling, comfort, and value. Always lurking is the risk of trying to squeeze too much into a small hull, such as larger cockpits, more spacious decks, increased interior volume, and a plethora of modern gadgetry. But Glen Henderson and the Hunter Design Group have found a superb balance in this package of upgrades." Simon continued, "small but ultimately significant adjustments to the deck design add up to notable ergonomic efficiency. The cockpit pedestal has been moved back a few inches to create a larger cockpit area. A clever drop-down/walk-through transom adds to the usable space, and because this is a relatively high-sided vessel, it will be the preferred boarding point". The conclusion is, "The Hunter 33 shows no incongruities in its core concept. This is a contemporary-looking, modern-feeling coastal or near-offshore cruiser designed to take an entire family to sea in ease, style, and comfort."

In a 2014 review for charter operator Norton Yachts, Jon Grant described the boat, "the Marlow Hunter 33 comes with a hard chine, dual ended main sheeting, internal halyards led back to the cockpit, self-tailing winches, a jib furling system, and an optional in mast furling system with a rigid vang that make sailing this boat so easy." and states, "It’s hard to believe what Marlow Hunter can pack into a 33’ boat and still make it so comfortable and easy to sail."

Charter and sailing school, Great Lakes Sailing noted in a review, "The Award-Winning Hunter 33 is a stunning New sailing yacht. Hunter’s signature window line gives this yacht the sleek feel of the latest Hunters, but the improvements don’t end there. The hull design has been improved, featuring a wider beam further aft as well as a more profound bow hollow. The result of this hull design is a longer dynamic waterline, which means more speed. The deck features a sleek, modern profile with large side windows allowing for increased interior light. The deck hatches are flush-mount, offering an enhanced look that complements the new profile. Lengthening the cockpit has allowed the new Hunter 33 to have a cockpit that is longer than its predecessor. The cockpit of the Hunter 33 also features a fold-down swim platform that extends the already lengthy cockpit when folded down while the boat is docked or at anchor."

== See also ==
- List of sailing boat types

Related development

- Hunter 33-2004

Similar sailboats

- Abbott 33
- C&C 3/4 Ton
- C&C 33
- C&C 101
- C&C SR 33
- CS 33
- Endeavour 33
- Hunter 33
- Hunter 33.5
- Hunter 333
- Hunter 340
- Mirage 33
- Hunter 336
- Moorings 335
- Nonsuch 33
- Tanzer 10
- Viking 33
