= Hunter 33 =

Sailboat class

Development
- Designer: John Cherubini
- Location: United States
- Year: 1977
- Builder: Hunter Marine
- Name: Hunter 33

Boat
- Displacement: 10,600 lb (4,808 kg)
- Draft: 5.25 ft (1.60 m)

Hull
- Type: Monohull
- Construction: Fiberglass
- LOA: 32.67 ft (9.96 m)
- LWL: 27.08 ft (8.25 m)
- Beam: 10.17 ft (3.10 m)
- Engine: Inboard motor

Hull appendages
- Keel: fin keel
- Ballast: 4,100 lb (1,860 kg)
- Rudder: internally-mounted spade-type rudder

Rig
- Rig type: Bermuda rig
- I foretriangle height: 42.50 ft (12.95 m)
- J foretriangle base: 14.00 ft (4.27 m)
- P mainsail luff: 37.08 ft (11.30 m)
- E mainsail foot: 10.75 ft (3.28 m)

Sails
- Sailplan: Masthead sloop
- Mainsail area: 199.31 sq ft (18.517 m^{2})
- Jib/genoa area: 297.50 sq ft (27.639 m^{2})
- Total sail area: 496.81 sq ft (46.155 m^{2})

Racing
- PHRF: 144 (average)

The Hunter 33 is an American sailboat that was designed by John Cherubini and first built in 1977.

The design was originally marketed by the manufacturer as the Hunter 33, but is often confused with the 2004 Hunter 33-2004, which was also sold as the Hunter 33, and the 2012 Hunter E33, which is in production as the Marlow-Hunter 33.

== Production ==
The design was built by Hunter Marine in the United States, but it is now out of production.

== Design ==
The Hunter 33 is a small recreational keelboat, built predominantly of fiberglass, with wood trim. It has a masthead sloop rig, a raked stem, a raised reverse transom, an internally-mounted spade-type rudder controlled by a wheel and a fixed fin keel. It displaces 10,600 lb (4,808 kg) and carries 4,100 lb (1,860 kg) of ballast.

The boat has a draft of 5.25 ft (1.60 m) with the standard keel and 4.0 ft (1.2 m) with the optional shoal draft keel.

The boat is fitted with an inboard motor for docking and maneuvering.

With the standard keel the design has a PHRF racing average handicap of 144 with a high of 150 and low of 141. With the shoal draft keel the design has a PHRF average handicap of 165 with a high of 174 and low of 156. Both configurations have hull speeds of 6.97 kn (12.91 km/h).

== See also ==
- List of sailing boat types

Similar sailboats

- Abbott 33
- Alajuela 33
- Arco 33
- C&C 3/4 Ton
- C&C 33
- Cape Dory 33
- Cape Dory 330
- CS 33
- Endeavour 33
- Hans Christian 33
- Hunter 33-2
- Hunter 33-2004
- Hunter 33.5
- Hunter 333
- Hunter 336
- Hunter 340
- Mirage 33
- Moorings 335
- Nonsuch 33
- Tanzer 10
- Viking 33
- Watkins 33
