= Hunter 333 =

Sailboat class

Development
- Location: United States
- Year: 1988
- Builder: Hunter Marine
- Name: Hunter 333

Boat
- Displacement: 10,500 lb (4,763 kg)
- Draft: 4.50 ft (1.37 m)

Hull
- Type: Monohull
- Construction: Fiberglass
- LOA: 33.18 ft (10.11 m)
- LWL: 26.83 ft (8.18 m)
- Beam: 10.98 ft (3.35 m)
- Engine: Yanmar diesel inboard motor

Hull appendages
- Keel: fin keel
- Ballast: 4,000 lb (1,814 kg)
- Rudder: internally-mounted spade-type rudder

Rig
- Rig type: Bermuda rig
- I foretriangle height: 39.37 ft (12.00 m)
- J foretriangle base: 11.75 ft (3.58 m)
- P mainsail luff: 43.16 ft (13.16 m)
- E mainsail foot: 13.60 ft (4.15 m)

Sails
- Sailplan: Fractional B&R rigged sloop
- Total sail area: 522 sq ft (48.5 m^{2})

The Hunter 333 is an American sailboat that was first built in 1988.

== Production ==
The design was built by Hunter Marine in the United States, but it is now out of production.

== Design ==
The Hunter 333 is a recreational keelboat, built predominantly of fiberglass. It has a fractional sloop B&R rig, a raked stem, a reverse transom, an internally-mounted spade-type rudder controlled by a wheel and a fixed fin keel. It displaces 10,500 lb (4,763 kg) and carries 4,000 lb (1,814 kg) of ballast.

The boat has a draft of 4.50 ft (1.37 m) with the standard fin keel, but was also optionally available with a shoal draft wing keel. The boat is fitted with a Japanese Yanmar diesel engine.

The design has a hull speed of 6.94 kn (12.85 km/h).

== See also ==
- List of sailing boat types

Related development

- Hunter 33.5
- Moorings 335

Similar sailboats

- Abbott 33
- C&C 3/4 Ton
- C&C 33
- C&C 101
- C&C SR 33
- CS 33
- Endeavour 33
- Hunter 33
- Hunter 33-2004
- Hunter 340
- Marlow-Hunter 33
- Mirage 33
- Nonsuch 33
- Tanzer 10
- Viking 33
