= Hunter 33-2 =

Sailboat class

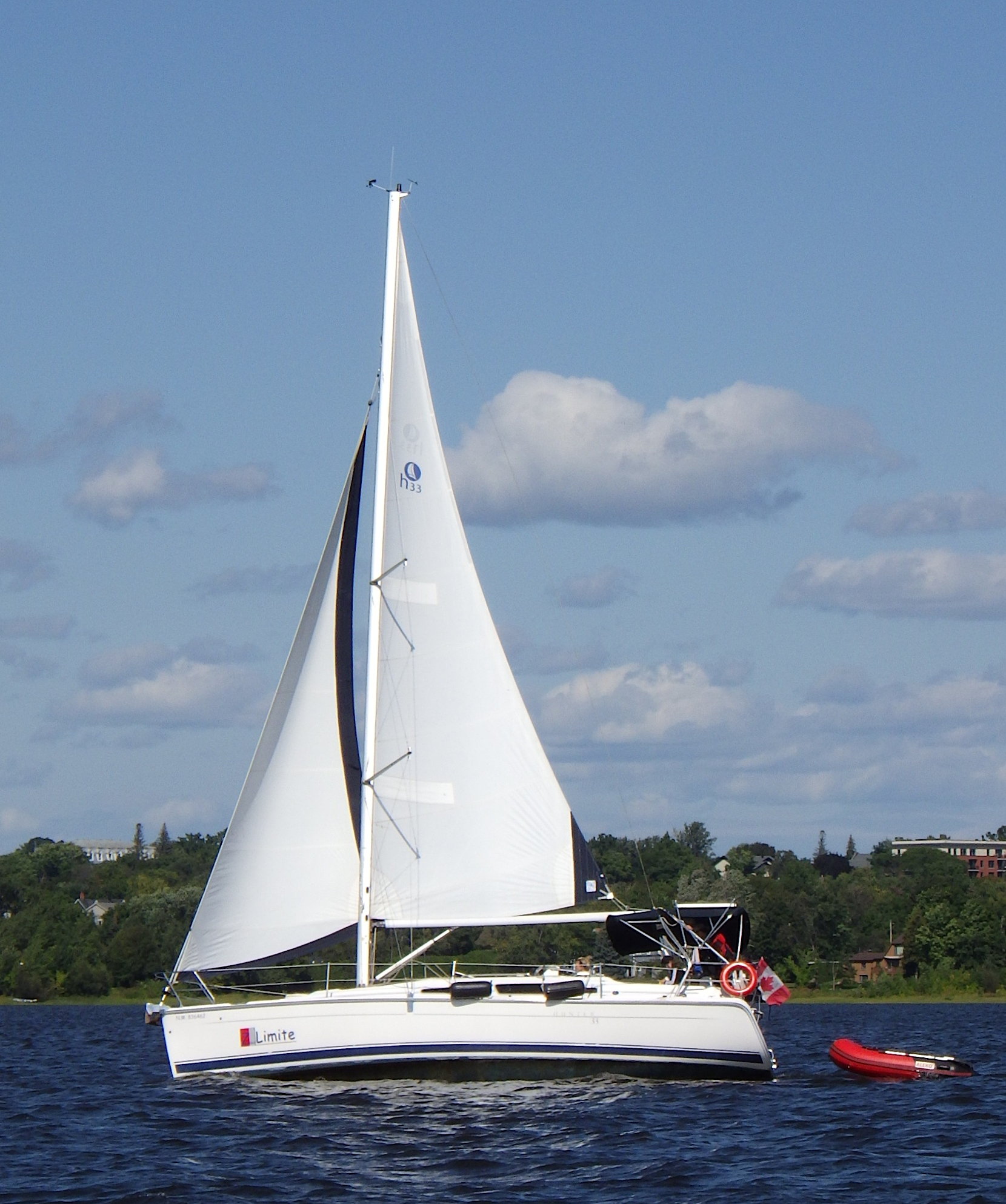

Development
- Designer: Glenn Henderson
- Location: United States
- Year: 2004
- Builder: Hunter Marine
- Name: Hunter 33-2

Boat
- Displacement: 10,410 lb (4,722 kg)
- Draft: 4.50 ft (1.37 m)

Hull
- Type: Monohull
- Construction: Fiberglass
- LOA: 33.50 ft (10.21 m)
- LWL: 29.42 ft (8.97 m)
- Beam: 11.50 ft (3.51 m)
- Engine: Yanmar 21 to 29 hp (16 to 22 kW) diesel engine

Hull appendages
- Keel: wing keel
- Ballast: 3,578 lb (1,623 kg)
- Rudder: internally-mounted spade-type rudder

Rig
- General: B&R rig
- Rig type: Bermuda rig
- I foretriangle height: 37.42 ft (11.41 m)
- J foretriangle base: 10.83 ft (3.30 m)
- P mainsail luff: 36.42 ft (11.10 m)
- E mainsail foot: 13.83 ft (4.22 m)

Sails
- Sailplan: Fractional rigged sloop
- Total sail area: 625 sq ft (58.1 m^{2})

The Hunter 33-2, also referred to as the Hunter 33-2004, is an American sailboat, that was designed by Glenn Henderson and first built in 2004.

The design was marketed as the Hunter 33, but is referred to as the Hunter 33-2004 or 33-2, to differentiate it from the other models that Hunter Marine has marketed under the same name, including the 1977 Hunter 33 and the 2012 Hunter E33, which remained in production in 2018 as the Marlow-Hunter 33.

== Production ==
The design was built by Hunter Marine in the United States between 2004 and 2012, but it is now out of production.

== Design ==
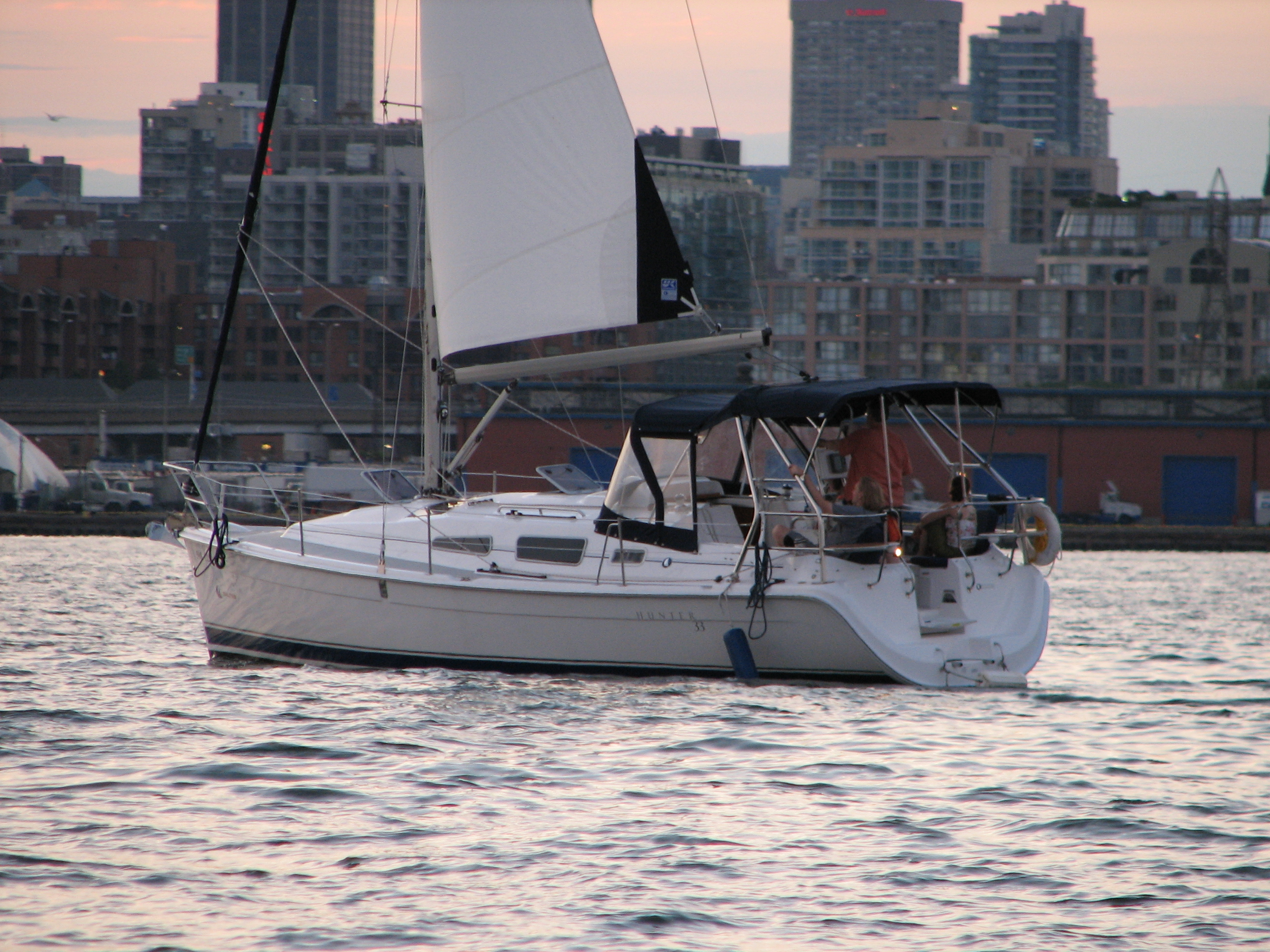
Hunter 33-2004

The Hunter 33-2 is a small recreational keelboat, built predominantly of fiberglass. The hull has a solid fiberglass monolithic bottom, with sandwich sides. The deck is a balsa and polyester fiberglass sandwich, with Kevlar reinforcing.

The design has a fractional sloop B&R rig, a plumb stem, a walk-through reverse transom, an internally-mounted spade-type rudder controlled by a wheel and a fixed fin keel or optional wing keel. The mast is deck-stepped and made from aluminum. A mast-furling mainsail was an option. With the fin keel it displaces 10,269 lb (4,658 kg) and carries 3,578 lb (1,623 kg) of ballast. With the wing keel it displaces 10,410 lb (4,722 kg) and carries 3,459 lb (1,569 kg) of cast iron ballast. The below decks headroom is 6.33 ft (1.93 m)

The boat has a draft of 5.50 ft (1.68 m) with the fin keel and 4.50 ft (1.37 m) with the optional shoal draft wing keel.

The boat is fitted with a Japanese Yanmar diesel engine of 21 hp (16 kW). A 29 hp (22 kW) engine was a factory option. The fuel tank holds 25 U.S. gallons (95 L; 21 imp gal) and the fresh water tank has a capacity of 50 U.S. gallons (190 L; 42 imp gal).

The design has a hull speed of 7.27 kn (13.46 km/h).

== See also ==
- List of sailing boat types

Related development

- Marlow-Hunter 33

Similar sailboats

- Abbott 33
- C&C 3/4 Ton
- C&C 33
- C&C 101
- C&C SR 33
- CS 33
- Endeavour 33
- Hunter 33
- Hunter 33.5
- Hunter 333
- Hunter 336
- Hunter 340
- Mirage 33
- Moorings 335
- Nonsuch 33
- Tanzer 10
- Viking 33
