= Hunter 336 =

Sailboat class

Development
- Designer: Rob Mazza
- Location: United States
- Year: 1995
- Builder: Hunter Marine
- Name: Hunter 336

Boat
- Displacement: 11,030 lb (5,003 kg)
- Draft: 4.50 ft (1.37 m)

Hull
- Type: Monohull
- Construction: Fiberglass
- LOA: 33.50 ft (10.21 m)
- LWL: 28.58 ft (8.71 m)
- Beam: 11.67 ft (3.56 m)
- Engine: Yanmar 3GM30F 27 hp (20 kW) diesel engine

Hull appendages
- Keel: fin keel
- Ballast: 4,100 lb (1,860 kg)
- Rudder: internally-mounted spade-type rudder

Rig
- Rig type: Bermuda rig
- I foretriangle height: 43.00 ft (13.11 m)
- J foretriangle base: 11.48 ft (3.50 m)
- P mainsail luff: 43.63 ft (13.30 m)
- E mainsail foot: 15.00 ft (4.57 m)

Sails
- Sailplan: Fractional B&R rigged sloop Masthead sloop
- Mainsail area: 327.23 sq ft (30.401 m^{2})
- Jib/genoa area: 246.82 sq ft (22.930 m^{2})
- Total sail area: 574.05 sq ft (53.331 m^{2})

The Hunter 336 is an American sailboat that was designed by Rob Mazza as coastal cruising boat and first built in 1995.

The Hunter 336 is a development of the smaller Hunter 29.5.

== Production ==
The design was built by Hunter Marine in the United States, but it is now out of production.

== Design ==
The Hunter 336 was designed as a larger twin cabin version of the Hunter 29.5, with a market of owners moving up from smaller sailboats. It is a recreational keelboat, built predominantly of fiberglass, with wood trim. It has a fractional sloop B&R rig, a slightly raked stem, a walk-through reverse transom, an internally-mounted spade-type rudder controlled by a wheel and a fixed fin keel. It displaces 11,030 lb (5,003 kg) and carries 4,100 lb (1,860 kg) of ballast.

The boat has a draft of 4.50 ft (1.37 m) with the standard keel fitted.

The boat is fitted with a Japanese Yanmar 3GM30F diesel engine of 27 hp (20 kW). The fuel tank holds 30 U.S. gallons (110 L; 25 imp gal) and the fresh water tank has a capacity of 80 U.S. gallons (300 L; 67 imp gal).

== Operational history ==
Thom Burns, writing for Northern Breezes in a 1997 review of the design praised its light air performance, making 2.3 to 3 kn (4 to 6 km/h) knots in a wind of 3 to 5 kn (6 to 9 km/h). Burns noted the sailing qualities, "The fractional rig points pretty well. We were around the high 30’s to 40 degrees apparent even in the very light stuff. The power is in the main. Since the spreaders are angled aft to eliminate the backstay, vang trimming for good sail shape is essential. The main also has lazyjacks which make it easy to take the main down or reef it with only one other person aboard. Hunter has made this boat easy to handle by a couple and single handling should be easy as well." Of the interior he wrote, "Like all modern Hunters, the Hunter 336 has a light, airy look and feel. The 336 comes in two layouts to fit the boat owner’s needs. The first has a large open salon with a full wrap around settee and open forward V-berth with curtains. This is designed for folks who only occasionally have sleep over guests. It is ideal for entertaining below. The second layout below offers an enclosed forward stateroom for family or friends. This second version is preferred by several charter companies. There are a fair amount of teak and ash accents below."

A 2003 review on Boats.com noted that the design is fast in light air and also praised the interior. It states, "Our performance in the day's conditions quickly erased any prior doubts I had held about the 336's unconventional rig and sailplan. In fact, by the end of our sail Bergstrom's elegant tapered, fractional spar was amongst my favorite features of the boat. Without a backstay I hypothesized that in 20-knots apparent the forestay would be sagging like a wet noodle. To my surprise however, the furler's extrusions were deflected by no more than a few inches." On the interior the writer said, "Down below the 336 has a airy and open two cabin layout. The Hunter is, as Lamia Charlebois observed, like a "condo"—perfect for entertaining or enjoying a sit-down meal with two other couples. There are so many opening windows and hatches (11 in total) that I felt for a moment, albeit brief, that I was inside a solarium and not a cabin."

== See also ==
- List of sailing boat types

Related development

- Hunter 29.5
- Hunter 340

Similar sailboats

- Abbott 33
- C&C 3/4 Ton
- C&C 33
- C&C 101
- C&C SR 33
- CS 33
- Endeavour 33
- Hunter 33
- Hunter 33-2004
- Hunter 33.5
- Marlow-Hunter 33
- Mirage 33
- Moorings 335
- Nonsuch 33
- Tanzer 10
- Viking 33
