= Hunter 340 =

Sailboat class

Development
- Designer: Hunter Design Team
- Location: United States
- Year: 1997 - 2002
- Builder: Hunter Marine
- Name: Hunter 340

Boat
- Displacement: 11,030 lb (5,003 kg)
- Draft: 4.50 ft (1.37 m)

Hull
- Type: Monohull
- Construction: Fiberglass
- LOA: 33.75 ft (10.29 m)
- LWL: 28.58 ft (8.71 m)
- Beam: 11.67 ft (3.56 m)
- Engine: Yanmar 27 hp (20 kW) diesel engine

Hull appendages
- Keel: fin keel
- Ballast: 4,100 lb (1,860 kg)
- Rudder: internally-mounted spade-type rudder

Rig
- Rig type: Bermuda rig
- I foretriangle height: 43.00 ft (13.11 m)
- J foretriangle base: 11.50 ft (3.51 m)
- P mainsail luff: 44.00 ft (13.41 m)
- E mainsail foot: 16.00 ft (4.88 m)

Sails
- Sailplan: Fractional B&R rigged sloop
- Mainsail area: 353.00 sq ft (32.795 m^{2})
- Jib/genoa area: 247.25 sq ft (22.970 m^{2})
- Total sail area: 599.25 sq ft (55.672 m^{2})

Racing
- PHRF: 141 (average)

The Hunter 340 is an American sailboat that was designed by the Hunter Design Team as cruising sailboat and first built in 1997.

== Production ==
The design was built by Hunter Marine in the United States starting in 1997, but production ended in 2002.

== Design ==
The Hunter 340 is a recreational keelboat, built predominantly of fiberglass. It has a fractional sloop B&R rig, a slightly raked stem, a walk-through reverse transom with an integral swim platform and ladder, an internally mounted spade-type rudder controlled by a wheel and a fixed fin keel. It displaces 11,030 lb (5,003 kg) and carries 4,100 lb (1,860 kg) of ballast.

The boat has a draft of 4.50 ft (1.37 m) with the standard keel and 6.00 ft (1.83 m) with the optional deep-draft fin keel.

The boat is fitted with a Japanese Yanmar diesel engine of 27 hp (20 kW). The fuel tank holds 30 U.S. gallons (110 L; 25 imp gal) and the fresh water tank has a capacity of 75 U.S. gallons (280 L; 62 imp gal). There is also a 30 U.S. gallons (110 L; 25 imp gal) holding tank.

Standard factory equipment on the 340 included a 110% genoa, dual two-speed self-tailing winches, a stainless steel mainsheet arch, dorade vents, a marine VHF radio, knotmeter, depth sounder, stereo system, a hardwood cabin sole, private forward and aft cabins, a dinette table that converts to a double bunk, a fully enclosed head with a shower, a microwave oven, double stainless steel sink, two burner liquefied petroleum gas stove, icebox, kitchen dishes, anchor, four life jackets and an emergency tiller. Optional equipment included a bimini, mast furling mainsail, autopilot, mainsheet traveller, refrigerator, air conditioning and a spinnaker and related hardware. The design includes below decks headroom of 76 in (193 cm).

The design has a PHRF racing average handicap of 141 with a high of 150 and low of 135. It has a hull speed of 7.16 kn (13.26 km/h).

== See also ==
- List of sailing boat types

Related development

- Hunter 336

Similar sailboats

- Abbott 33
- C&C 3/4 Ton
- C&C 33
- C&C 101
- C&C SR 33
- CS 33
- Endeavour 33
- Hunter 33
- Hunter 33-2004
- Hunter 33.5
- Hunter 333
- Marlow-Hunter 33
- Mirage 33
- Moorings 335
- Nonsuch 33
- Tanzer 10
- Viking 33
