= Nonsuch 33 =

Sailboat class

Development
- Designer: Mark Ellis Design
- Location: Canada
- Year: 1988
- No. built: 67
- Builders: Hinterhoeller Yachts; Wiggers Custom Yachts
- Name: Nonsuch 33

Boat
- Displacement: 15,350 lb (6,963 kg)
- Draft: 5.33 ft (1.62 m)

Hull
- Type: Monohull
- Construction: Fiberglass
- LOA: 33.42 ft (10.19 m)
- LWL: 31.46 ft (9.59 m)
- Beam: 12.50 ft (3.81 m)
- Engine: Yanmar 3JH2T-BE diesel engine

Hull appendages
- Keel: fin keel
- Ballast: 6,050 lb (2,744 kg)
- Rudder: internally-mounted spade-type rudder

Rig
- Rig type: Cat rig
- P mainsail luff: 50.50 ft (15.39 m)
- E mainsail foot: 26.50 ft (8.08 m)

Sails
- Sailplan: Catboat
- Mainsail area: 669 sq ft (62.2 m^{2})
- Total sail area: 669 sq ft (62.2 m^{2})

Racing
- PHRF: 171 (average)

The Nonsuch 33 is a Canadian sailboat, that was designed by Mark Ellis Design and first built in 1988.

The Nonsuch 33 is a development of the Nonsuch 30, which was the first design in the series of Nonsuch sailboats.

== Production ==
The design was built by Hinterhoeller Yachts in Canada and a few have also been built by Wiggers Custom Yachts, who currently hold the molds. A total of 67 examples of the design have been completed.

== Design ==
The Nonsuch 33 is a small recreational keelboat, built predominantly of fiberglass. It has a cat rig, an unstayed mast with a wishbone boom, a plumb stem, a vertical transom, an internally-mounted spade-type rudder controlled by a wheel and a fixed fin keel. It displaces 15,350 lb (6,963 kg) and carries 6,050 lb (2,744 kg) of ballast.

The boat has a draft of 5.33 ft (1.62 m) with the standard keel and 4.33 ft (1.32 m) with the optional shoal draft keel.

The boat has been fitted with a variety of small diesel engines including the Japanese Yanmar 3JH2T-BE diesel engine, the Universal M35 and the Volvo MD2040. The fuel tank holds 40 U.S. gallons (150 L; 33 imp gal) and the fresh water tank has a capacity of 96 U.S. gallons (360 L; 80 imp gal).

The design has a PHRF racing average handicap of 171 with a high of 171 and low of 168. It has a hull speed of 7.52 kn (13.93 km/h).

== See also ==
- List of sailing boat types

Similar sailboats

- Abbott 33
- Alajuela 33
- Arco 33
- C&C 33
- Cape Dory 33
- Cape Dory 330
- CS 33
- Endeavour 33
- Hans Christian 33
- Hunter 33
- Hunter 33-2004
- Hunter 33.5
- Hunter 333
- Hunter 336
- Hunter 340
- Marlow-Hunter 33
- Mirage 33
- Moorings 335
- Tanzer 10
- Viking 33
- Watkins 33
