= C&C 3/4 Ton =

Sailboat class

Development
- Designer: Robert W. Ball
- Location: Canada
- Year: 1974
- No. built: 15
- Builder: C&C Yachts
- Name: C&C 3/4 Ton

Boat
- Displacement: 9,800 lb (4,445 kg)
- Draft: 5.50 ft (1.68 m)

Hull
- Type: Monohull
- Construction: Fibreglass
- LOA: 32.83 ft (10.01 m)
- LWL: 26.42 ft (8.05 m)
- Beam: 10.50 ft (3.20 m)

Hull appendages
- Keel: fin keel
- Ballast: 4,075 lb (1,848 kg)
- Rudder: internally-mounted spade-type rudder

Rig
- General: Masthead sloop
- I foretriangle height: 43.00 ft (13.11 m)
- J foretriangle base: 14.00 ft (4.27 m)
- P mainsail luff: 37.30 ft (11.37 m)
- E mainsail foot: 10.80 ft (3.29 m)

Sails
- Mainsail area: 201.42 sq ft (18.713 m^{2})
- Jib/genoa area: 301.00 sq ft (27.964 m^{2})
- Total sail area: 502.42 sq ft (46.676 m^{2})

The C&C 3/4 Ton is a Canadian sailboat, that was designed by Robert W. Ball as an International Offshore Rule Three-Quarter Ton class racer and first built in 1974.

The design was developed into the C&C 33-1 later in 1974, using the same hull design and sailplan.

== Production ==
The boat was built on a "semi custom" basis by C&C Yachts in Canada and they completed 15 examples in 1974.

== Design ==
The C&C 3/4 Ton is a small racing keelboat, built predominantly of fibreglass, with wood trim. It has a masthead sloop rig, an internally-mounted spade-type rudder and a fixed fin keel. It displaces 9,800 lb (4,445 kg) and carries 4,075 lb (1,848 kg) of ballast.

The boat has a draft of 5.50 ft (1.68 m) with the standard keel fitted.

The design has a hull speed of 6.89 kn (12.76 km/h).

== Operational history ==
The boat is supported by an active class club that organizes racing events, the IOR 3/4 ton Association.

== See also ==
- List of sailing boat types

Related development

- C&C 1/2 Ton
- C&C 33-1

Similar sailboats

- Abbott 33
- BB 10 (keelboat)
- C&C SR 33
- CS 33
- DB-1
- DB-2
- Endeavour 33
- Hunter 33
- Hunter 33-2004
- Hunter 33.5
- Hunter 333
- Hunter 336
- Hunter 340
- Marlow-Hunter 33
- Mirage 33
- Moorings 335
- Nonsuch 33
- San Juan 33S
- Tanzer 10
- Tartan Ten
