= Ylva (keelboat) =

Development
- Designer: Steen Kjølhede
- Year: 1973

Boat
- Draft: 1.60 m (5.2 ft)

Hull
- LOA: 12.68 m (41.6 ft)
- LWL: 9 m (30 ft)
- Beam: 2.29 m (7.5 ft)

Ylva is a 12.68-metre (41.6 ft) sailboat class designed by Steen Kjølhede and built in about 100 copies.

== History ==
Dinghy builder Steen Kjølhede built the first wooden Ylva in 1973 and won the 1973 Sjælland Rundt, an achievement he repeated three more times in a row with new-built Ylvas.

== See also ==
- BB 10 (keelboat)
