= BB 10 (keelboat) =

Sailboat class

Development
- Designer: Børge Børresen and Anders Børresen
- Location: Denmark
- Year: 1977
- No. built: 150
- Builder: Børresen Bådebyggeri
- Name: BB 10

Boat
- Displacement: 4,956 lb (2,248 kg)
- Draft: 4.80 ft (1.46 m)

Hull
- Type: Monohull
- Construction: Fiberglass
- LOA: 32.80 ft (10.00 m)
- LWL: 23.92 ft (7.29 m)
- Beam: 7.55 ft (2.30 m)
- Engine: optional outboard motor

Hull appendages
- Keel: fin keel
- Ballast: 2,700 lb (1,225 kg)
- Rudder: internally-mounted spade-type rudder

Rig
- Rig type: Bermuda rig
- I foretriangle height: 30.10 ft (9.17 m)
- J foretriangle base: 9.82 ft (2.99 m)
- P mainsail luff: 36.09 ft (11.00 m)
- E mainsail foot: 11.65 ft (3.55 m)

Sails
- Sailplan: Fractional rigged sloop
- Mainsail area: 210.22 sq ft (19.530 m^{2})
- Jib/genoa area: 147.79 sq ft (13.730 m^{2})
- Spinnaker area: 545 sq ft (50.6 m^{2})
- Total sail area: 358.02 sq ft (33.261 m^{2})

Racing
- PHRF: 120 (average)

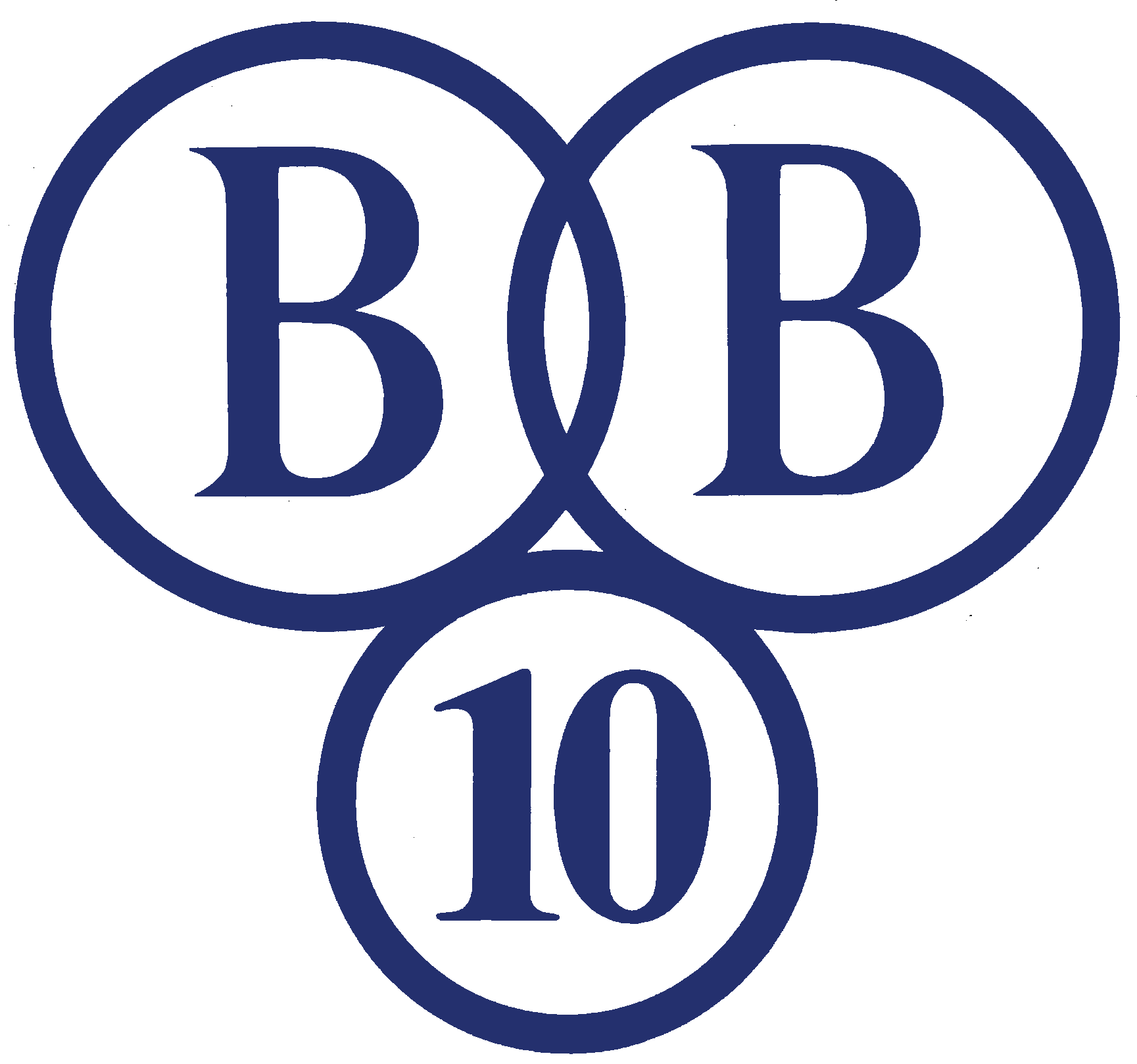
BB10's sail sign

The BB 10 (also referred to as the BB10, BB-10 and BB 10 Meter) is a Danish sailboat that was designed by Børge Børresen and his son, Anders Børresen, as a one-design racer and first built in 1977.

== Production ==
The design is built by Børresen Bådebyggeri (Børresen Boatbuilding) in Denmark, with about 150 boats completed since production started in 1977. It remained in production in 2019.

About 20 boats were also built at Scandinavian Yachts in Annapolis, Maryland, United States. North American production was intended to move to Whitby Boat Works in Whitby, Ontario, Canada in the 1980s, but it unclear if any boats were completed there.

== Design ==
The BB-10 is a recreational keelboat, built predominantly of fiberglass over a foam core. It has a fractional sloop rig, a spooned raked stem, a raised counter reverse transom, an internally mounted spade-type rudder controlled by a tiller and a fixed fin keel. It displaces 4,956 lb (2,248 kg) and carries 2,700 lb (1,225 kg) of lead ballast.

The boat has a draft of 4.80 ft (1.46 m) with the standard keel fitted.

A motor is considered optional, but the boat can be fitted with a small outboard motor for docking and maneuvering.

Optimized for racing, below decks the BB 10 is very cramped, compared to other boats of this length and has only 4.75 ft (1.45 m) of headroom. The design's galley slides out from beside the companionway steps for use and includes a two-burner alcohol-fired stove. Sleeping accommodations are minimal and consist of two settee sea berths, plus a bow "V"-berth. Ventilation is provided by a bow hatch and a translucent hatch forward of the mast. There is no built-in fresh water tank.

The standing rigging is of stainless steel rod and the design has wooden decks. The cockpit is large and includes provisions for a cockpit table. All lines and controls are led to the cockpit, even the boom control line for the 545 sq ft (50.6 m^{2}) spinnaker. Four deck winches are provided for the spinnaker and genoa sheets.

The design has a PHRF racing average handicap of 120.

== Operational history ==
A 1984 review in Canadian Yachting by Steve Killing compared the design to an enlarged Soling with a narrow beam. About the accommodations, he wrote, "Their brochure states that "standing headroom is only four feet, nine inches, though sitting headroom is ample." I'm not sure that "standing headroom" is the correct term here, but we will let the figures speak for themselves. The interior is not meant to be lush. It's a bit like camping in a fiberglass tent. There are settee berths for sitting or snoozing and a galley module that pulls out from under the cockpit when required."

In a 1994 review Richard Sherwood described the design, "the BB is a boat for racing, not cruising. Its very narrow beam sacrifices interior volume for speed. The narrow beam and light displacement also are penalized by the IOR. However, BB is claimed to beat at 6 knots in 6 knots of wind, reach at 8, and semiplane at 13 in 18 knots of wind."

== See also ==
- List of sailing boat types

Similar sailboats

- C&C 3/4 Ton
- C&C SR 33
- Soling
- Ylva (keelboat)
