= Steen Kjølhede =

Danish sailor

Personal information
- Nationality: Danish
- Born: 5 May 1945 (age 79); Frederiksberg, Denmark

Sport
- Sport: Sailing

Steen Kjølhede (born 5 May 1945) is a Danish sailor. He competed in the Finn event at the 1972 Summer Olympics.
