= Keel cooler =

A keel cooler is a type of internal combustion engine cooling system used in marine engines.

In this system, engine coolant is circulated through a system of tubing outside the vessel's hull, using the lower temperature of seawater to reduce the coolant temperature via heat exchange before it is recirculated through the engine. Simpler designs take the form of a tank within the hull adjacent to the vessel's hull plating. For maximum efficiency, manufacturers design keel coolers with baffles and others means of slowing and disrupting the flow of coolant and/or seawater in order to maximize heat transfer.
