= Inboard motor =

Marine propulsion system for boats

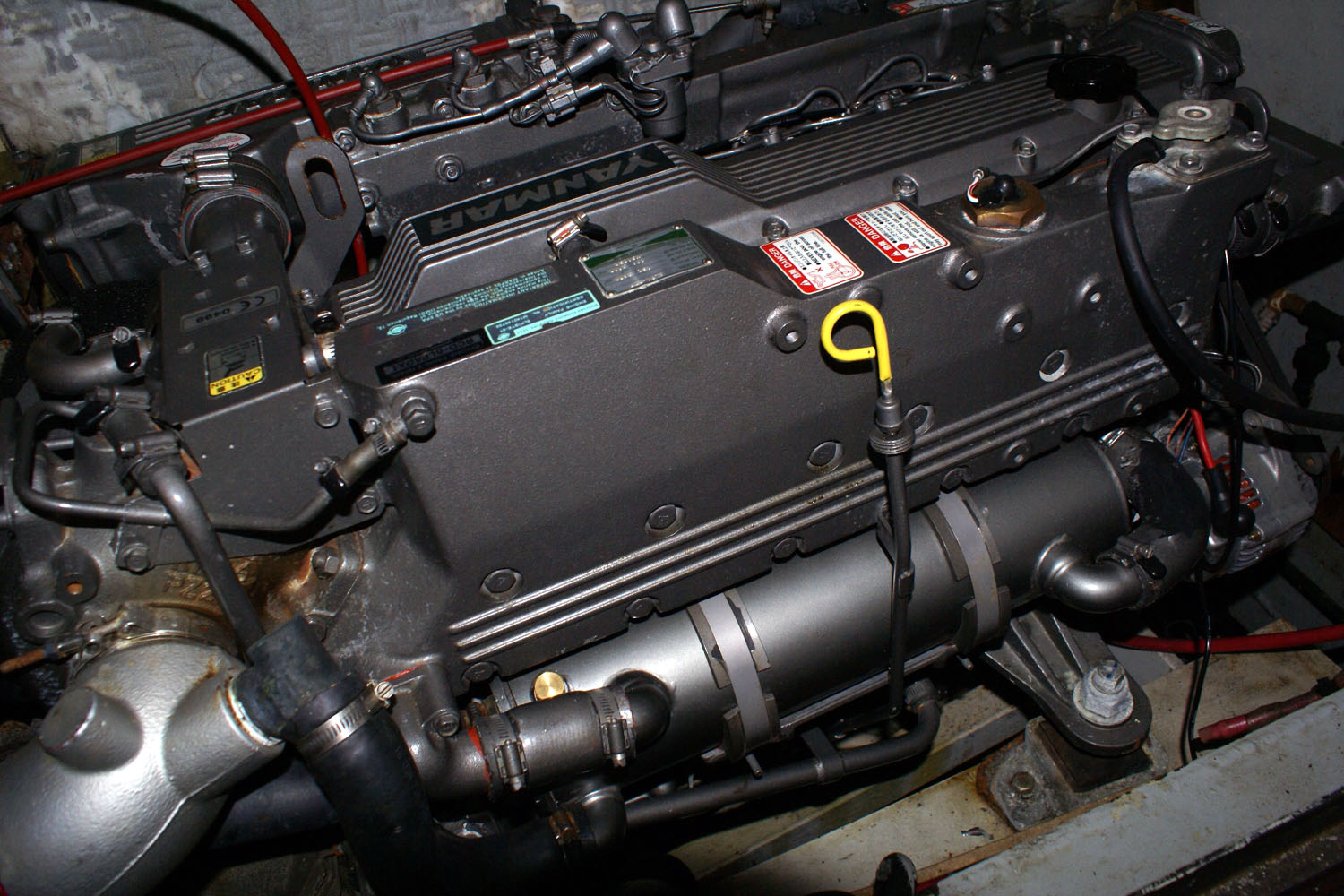
A 260-horsepower (190 kW) diesel inboard motor

An inboard motor is a marine propulsion system for boats. As opposed to an outboard motor, where an engine is mounted outside the hull of the craft, an inboard motor is an engine enclosed within the hull of the boat, usually connected to a propulsion screw by a driveshaft.

Marine diesel engines used in international shipping are the largest engines ever produced.

== History ==
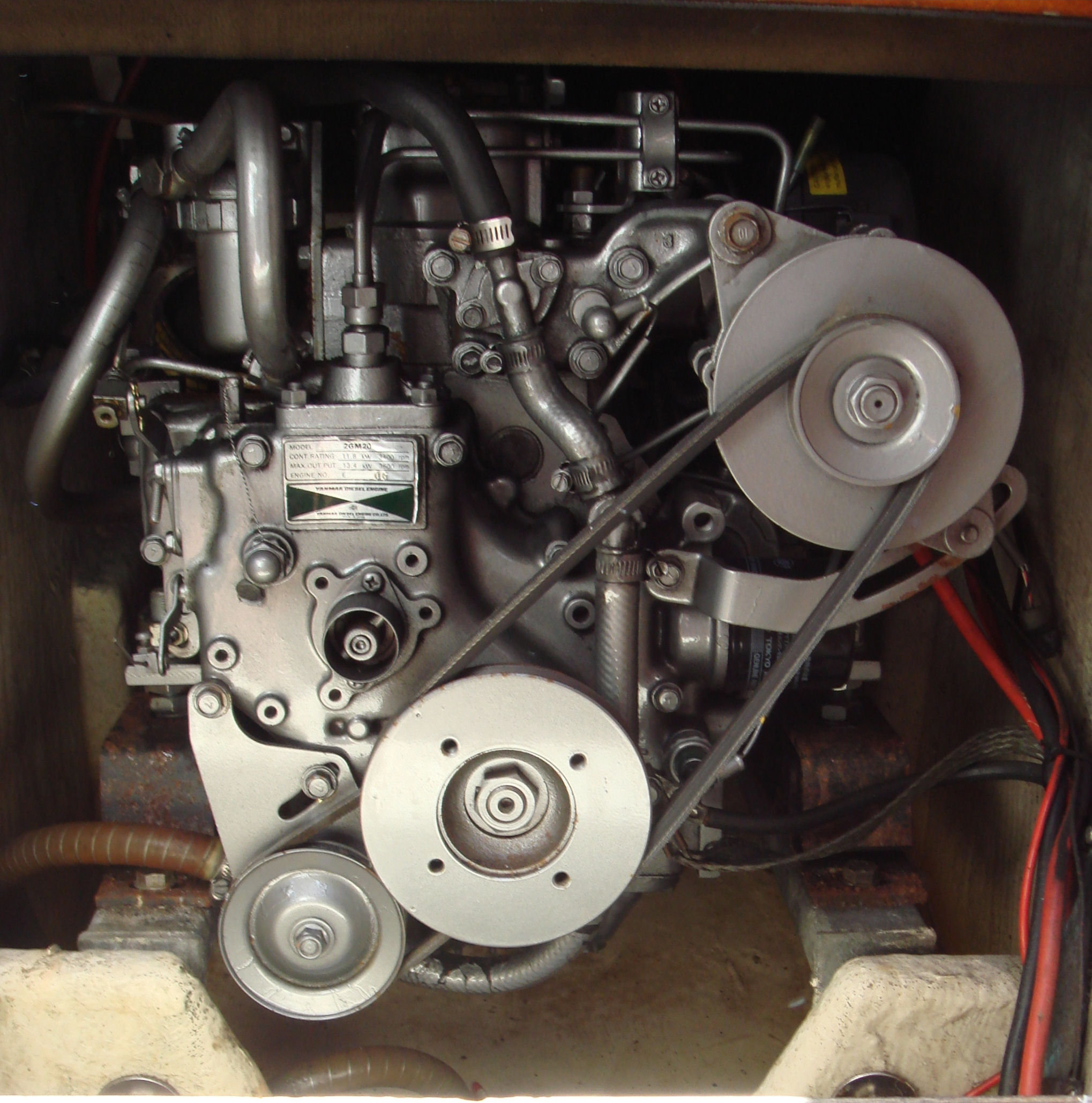
A 16-horsepower (12 kW) inboard marine diesel engine, installed in a sailboat

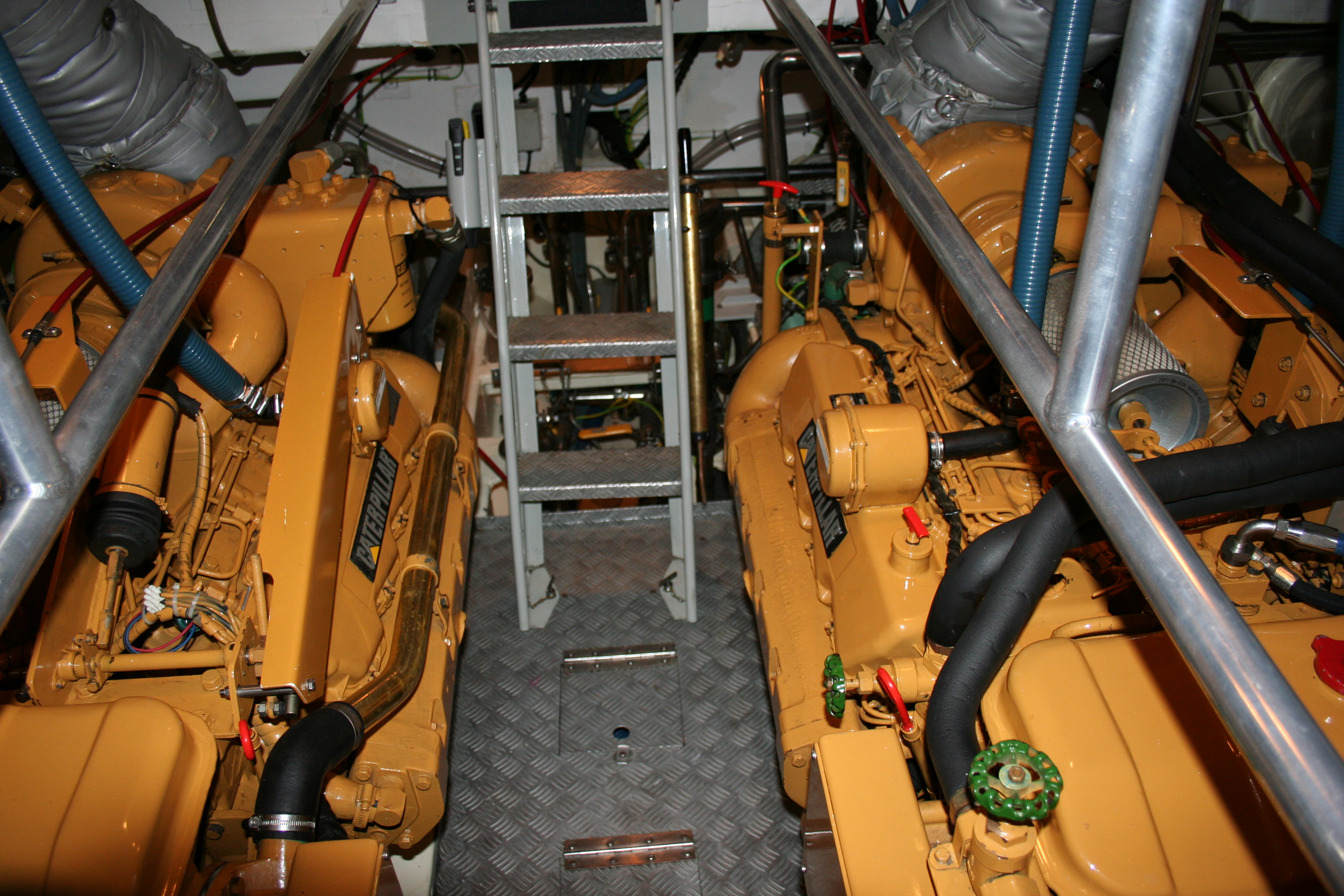
Engine room layout of a rescue boat

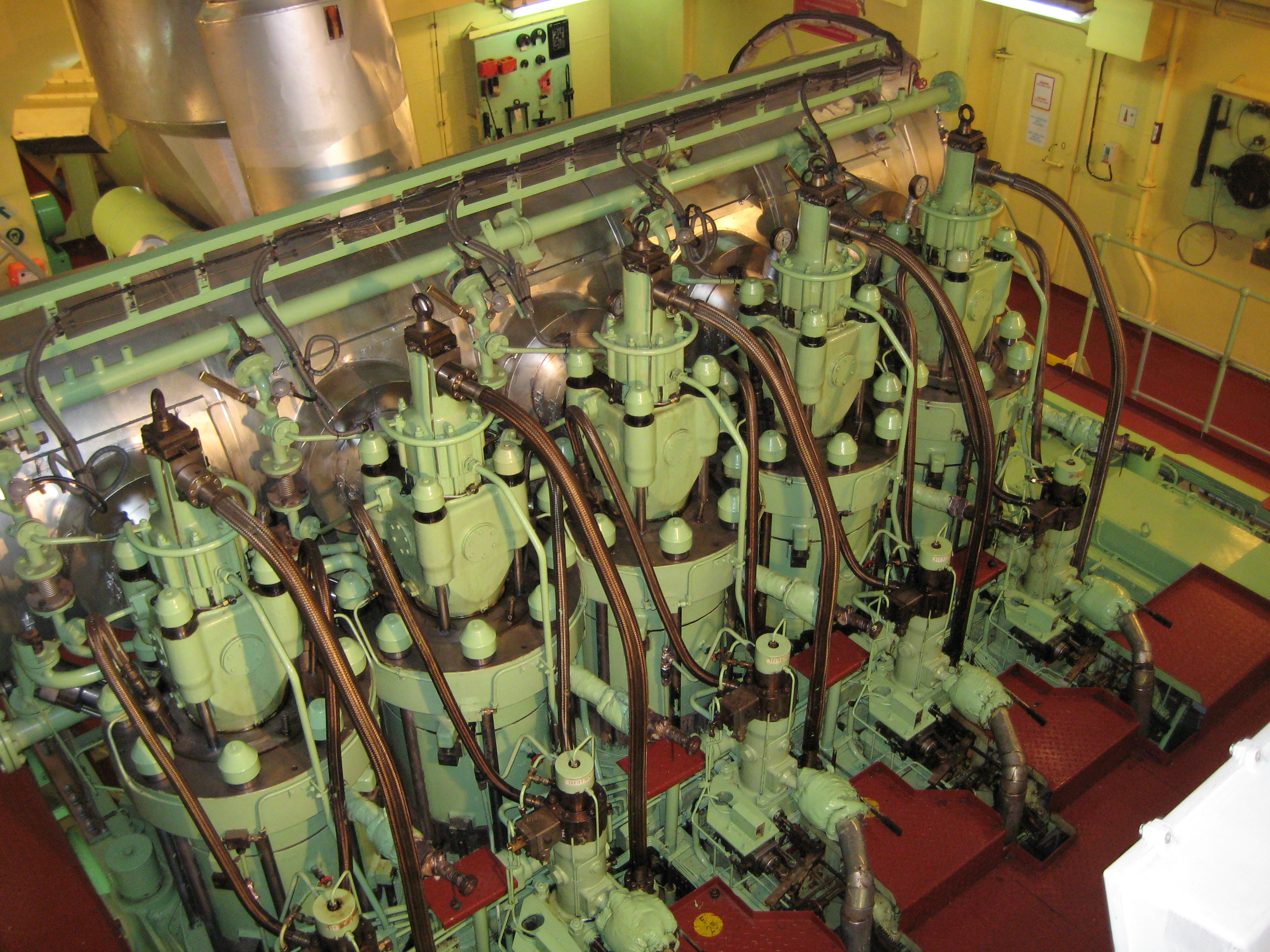
An 11,100-horsepower (8,300 kW) inline-5, 2-stroke, low-speed marine diesel engine, powering a ship

The first marine craft to utilize inboard motors were steam engines going back to 1805 and the Clermont and the Charlotte Dundas. Harbour tugs, and small steam launches had inboard steam engines. In the 1880s the naphtha engine made its appearance and a few boat engines appeared. Such engines had low power and high fuel consumption. The gasoline (petrol) engine pioneer Gottlieb Daimler and Maybach built a four-cycle boat engine and tested it in 1887 on the Neckar River. Sintz in America built several commercially available engines from 1893.

== Sizes ==
Inboard motors may be of several types, suitable for the size of craft they are fitted to. Boats can use one cylinder to V12 engines, depending if they are used for racing or trolling.

=== Small craft ===
For pleasure craft, such as sailboats and speedboats, diesel, gasoline and electric engines are used. Many inboard motors are derivatives of automobile engines, known as marine automobile engines. The advent of the stern drive propulsion leg improved design so that auto engines could easily power boats.

=== Large craft ===
For larger craft, including ships, where outboard propulsion would in any case not be suitable, the propulsion system may include many types, such as diesel, gas turbine, or even fossil-fuel or nuclear-generated steam. Some early models used coal for steam-driven ships.

The largest engines in the world are marine diesel engines used to power supertankers and container ships. The Wärtsilä RT-flex96C produces 109,000 horsepower (81,000 kW), weighs 2,300 short tons (2,100 t), stands 44 feet (13 m) tall, is 90 feet (27 m) long, and has a maximum of 109 rpm.

== Cooling ==
Some inboard motors are freshwater cooled, while others have a raw water cooling system where water from the lake, river or sea is pumped by the engine to cool it.

However, as seawater is corrosive, and can damage engine blocks and cylinder heads, some seagoing craft have engines which are indirectly cooled via heat exchanger in a keel cooler. Other engines, notably small single and twin cylinder diesels specifically designed for marine use, use raw seawater for cooling and zinc sacrificial anodes are employed to protect the internal metal castings.
