= Hans Christian 33 =

Sailboat class

Development
- Designer: Harwood Ives
- Location: Taiwan; Thailand
- Year: 1980
- No. built: 168
- Builders: Hans Christian Yachts; Hansa Yachts Und Shifbau; Shing Fa Boatbuilding Company; Dutch East Indes Trading Company; Andersen Yachts; Pantawee Marine
- Role: Cruiser
- Name: Hans Christian 33

Boat
- Displacement: 19,000 lb (8,618 kg)
- Draft: 5.50 ft (1.68 m)

Hull
- Type: Monohull
- Construction: Fiberglass
- LOA: 33.75 ft (10.29 m)
- LWL: 29.17 ft (8.89 m)
- Beam: 11.67 ft (3.56 m)
- Engine: Yanmar diesel engine

Hull appendages
- Keel: long keel
- Ballast: 6,300 lb (2,858 kg)
- Rudder: keel-mounted rudder

Rig
- Rig type: Bermuda rig
- I foretriangle height: 40.00 ft (12.19 m)
- J foretriangle base: 18.00 ft (5.49 m)
- P mainsail luff: 34.00 ft (10.36 m)
- E mainsail foot: 14.10 ft (4.30 m)

Sails
- Sailplan: Cutter rigged sloop
- Mainsail area: 239.70 sq ft (22.269 m^{2})
- Jib/genoa area: 360.00 sq ft (33.445 m^{2})
- Total sail area: 599.70 sq ft (55.714 m^{2})

Racing
- D-PN: 95.0 (average)

The Hans Christian 33 is a recreational keelboat initially built by Hans Christian Yachts. From 1980 to 2018, 168 boats were constructed in Taiwan and Thailand. It was also sold as the Hans Christian 33 Traditional and the Traditional 33. The design evolved from the Hans Christian 38 and 42.

The fiberglass hull has a spooned raked stem, a bulbous rounded transom, a large keel-mounted rudder controlled by a wheel, and an optional bowsprit. The fuel tank holds 80 U.S. gallons (300 L; 67 imp gal) and the fresh water tank has a capacity of 90 U.S. gallons (340 L; 75 imp gal) or 120 U.S. gallons (450 L; 100 imp gal).

The below decks accommodation is unconventional, with a double Pullman berth aft on the starboard side and another forward on the port side. The galley is on the port side at the foot of the companionway steps, and is just aft of the dinette table. The galley includes a three-burner gimballed stove and an icebox. The dinette table does not convert to a berth, but the starboard settee does, for a total sleeping accommodation for five people. The head is located in the very bow and includes a hanging locker and a shower. There are provisions for a generator and also for air conditioning.

The boat makes extensive use of teak above decks and mahogany below. The cockpit, the decks and the cabin trunk roof are all made from teak. Ventilation is provided by three pairs of dorade vents, two hatches and six opening bronze ports.

It has a cutter rig and sheet and halyard winches are located on the cockpit coaming and on the mast.
