= Watkins 33 =

Sailboat class

Development
- Designer: William H. Tripp Jr and Watkins Yachts
- Location: Canada United States
- Year: 1984
- Builder: Watkins Yachts
- Name: Watkins 33

Boat
- Displacement: 11,200 lb (5,080 kg)
- Draft: 4.00 ft (1.22 m)

Hull
- Type: Monohull
- Construction: Fiberglass
- LOA: 33.08 ft (10.08 m)
- LWL: 26.58 ft (8.10 m)
- Beam: 10.18 ft (3.10 m)
- Engine: Yanmar diesel engine

Hull appendages
- Keel: fin keel
- Ballast: 5,500 lb (2,495 kg)
- Rudder: skeg-mounted rudder

Rig
- Rig type: Bermuda rig
- I foretriangle height: 38.75 ft (11.81 m)
- J foretriangle base: 13.75 ft (4.19 m)
- P mainsail luff: 33.00 ft (10.06 m)
- E mainsail foot: 12.25 ft (3.73 m)

Sails
- Sailplan: Masthead sloop
- Mainsail area: 202.13 sq ft (18.778 m^{2})
- Jib/genoa area: 266.41 sq ft (24.750 m^{2})
- Total sail area: 468.53 sq ft (43.528 m^{2})

The Watkins 33, also marketed as the Seawolf 33, is an American sailboat that was designed by William H. Tripp Jr and Watkins Yachts as a cruiser and first built in 1984.

The Watkins 33 is a development of the Watkins 32, with a reverse transom and a revised interior.

== Production ==
The design was built by Watkins Yachts in the United States from 1984 until 1989, with 47 examples built, but it is now out of production.

== Design ==
The Watkins 33 is a recreational keelboat, built predominantly of fiberglass, with wood trim. It has a masthead sloop rig, a raked stem, a reverse transom, a skeg-mounted rudder controlled by a wheel and a fixed fin keel. It displaces 11,200 lb (5,080 kg) and carries 5,500 lb (2,495 kg) of ballast.

The boat has a draft of 4.00 ft (1.22 m) with the standard keel fitted.

The boat is fitted with a Japanese Yanmar diesel engine. The fuel tank holds 30 U.S. gallons (110 L; 25 imp gal) and the fresh water tank has a capacity of 60 U.S. gallons (230 L; 50 imp gal).

The design has a hull speed of 6.91 kn (12.80 km/h).

== Operational history ==
The boat is supported by an active class club, the Watkins Owners.

== See also ==
- List of sailing boat types
