= Viking 33 =

Sailboat class

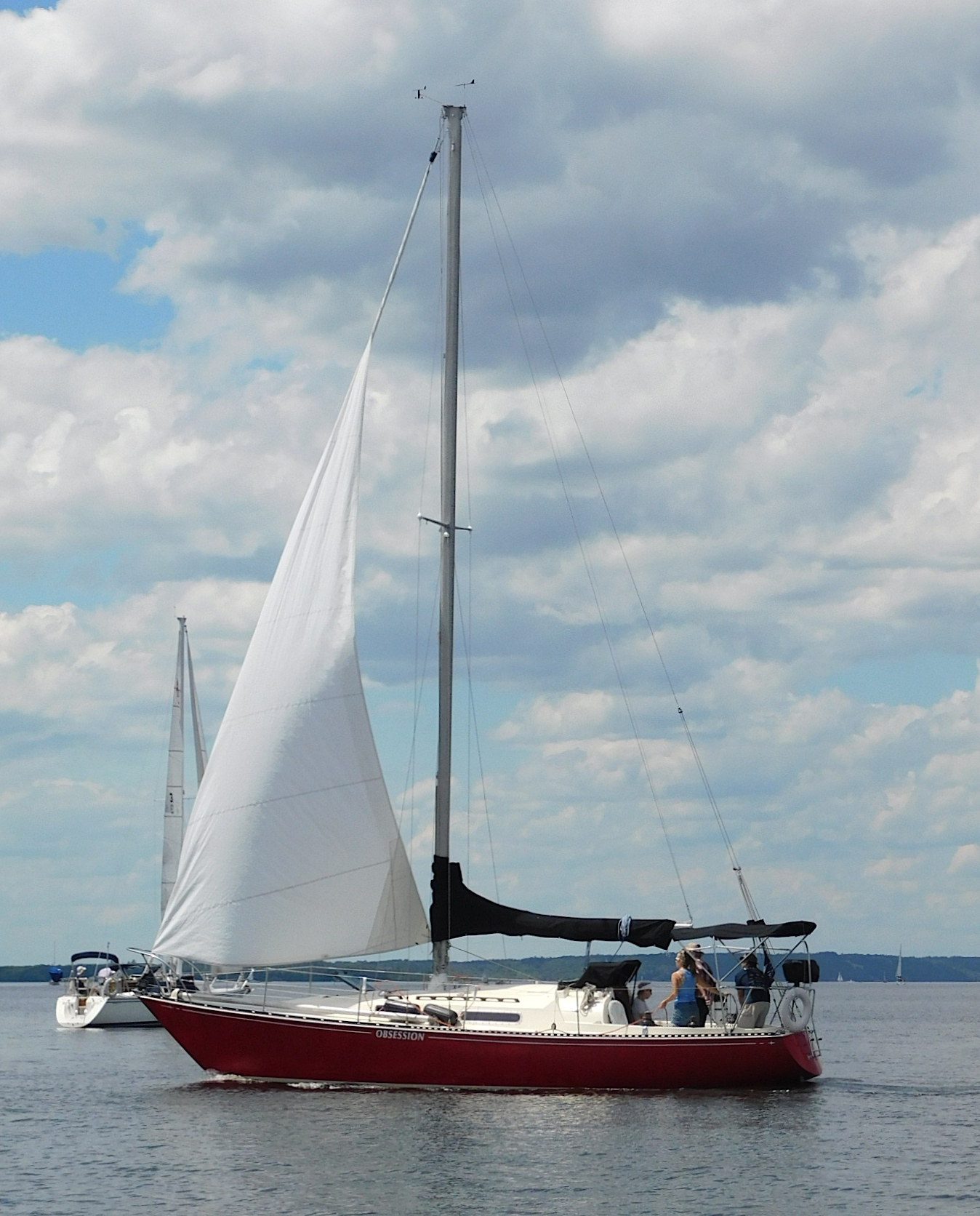

Development
- Designer: Cuthbertson & Cassian
- Location: Canada
- Year: 1971
- Builder: Ontario Yachts
- Name: Viking 33

Boat
- Displacement: 8,807 lb (3,995 kg)
- Draft: 5.50 ft (1.68 m)

Hull
- Type: Monohull
- Construction: Fiberglass
- LOA: 33.58 ft (10.24 m)
- LWL: 27.17 ft (8.28 m)
- Beam: 9.83 ft (3.00 m)
- Engine: Universal Atomic 4 30 hp (22 kW) gasoline engine

Hull appendages
- Keel: swept fin keel
- Ballast: 4,512 lb (2,047 kg)
- Rudder: internally-mounted spade-type rudder

Rig
- Rig type: Bermuda rig
- I foretriangle height: 42.80 ft (13.05 m)
- J foretriangle base: 15.00 ft (4.57 m)
- P mainsail luff: 37.80 ft (11.52 m)
- E mainsail foot: 10.50 ft (3.20 m)

Sails
- Sailplan: Masthead sloop
- Mainsail area: 198.45 sq ft (18.437 m^{2})
- Jib/genoa area: 321.00 sq ft (29.822 m^{2})
- Total sail area: 519.45 sq ft (48.258 m^{2})

Racing
- PHRF: 138 (average)

The Viking 33 is a Canadian sailboat, that was designed by Cuthbertson & Cassian and first built in 1971.

The Viking 33 design was developed into the Viking 34 in 1973. The Viking 34 features a Peterson-style keel, a new interior design and a 1.5 ft (0.46 m) taller mast. Both designs have the same length overall of 33.58 ft (10.24 m).

== Production ==
The design was built by Ontario Yachts in Canada between 1971 and 1973, but it is now out of production.

== Design ==
The Viking 33 is a small recreational keelboat, built predominantly of fiberglass, with wood trim. It has a masthead sloop rig, a raked stem, a raised reverse transom, an internally-mounted spade-type rudder controlled by a tiller and a fixed swept fin keel. It displaces 8,807 lb (3,995 kg) and carries 4,512 lb (2,047 kg) of ballast.

The boat has a draft of 5.50 ft (1.68 m) with the standard keel fitted. It has 6.17 ft (1.88 m) of headroom below decks. The boat came factory-equipped with a 30 hp (22 kW) Universal Atomic 4 gasoline engine.

The design has a PHRF racing average handicap of 138 with a high of 141 and low of 138. It has a hull speed of 6.98 kn (12.93 km/h).

== Operational history ==
In a review Michael McGoldrick wrote, "Although the design is getting a little old, the Viking 33 still has to rate as one of the better looking boats on the water. It has sleek lines and a graceful bow. It may be just a touch narrower than the boats that were built in the 1980s, but it still has the appearance of a contemporary yacht. Like the Ontario 32, the Viking was also designed by C&C and built by Ontario Yachts. Unlike the Ontario 32, this boat was designed with racing in mind."

== See also ==
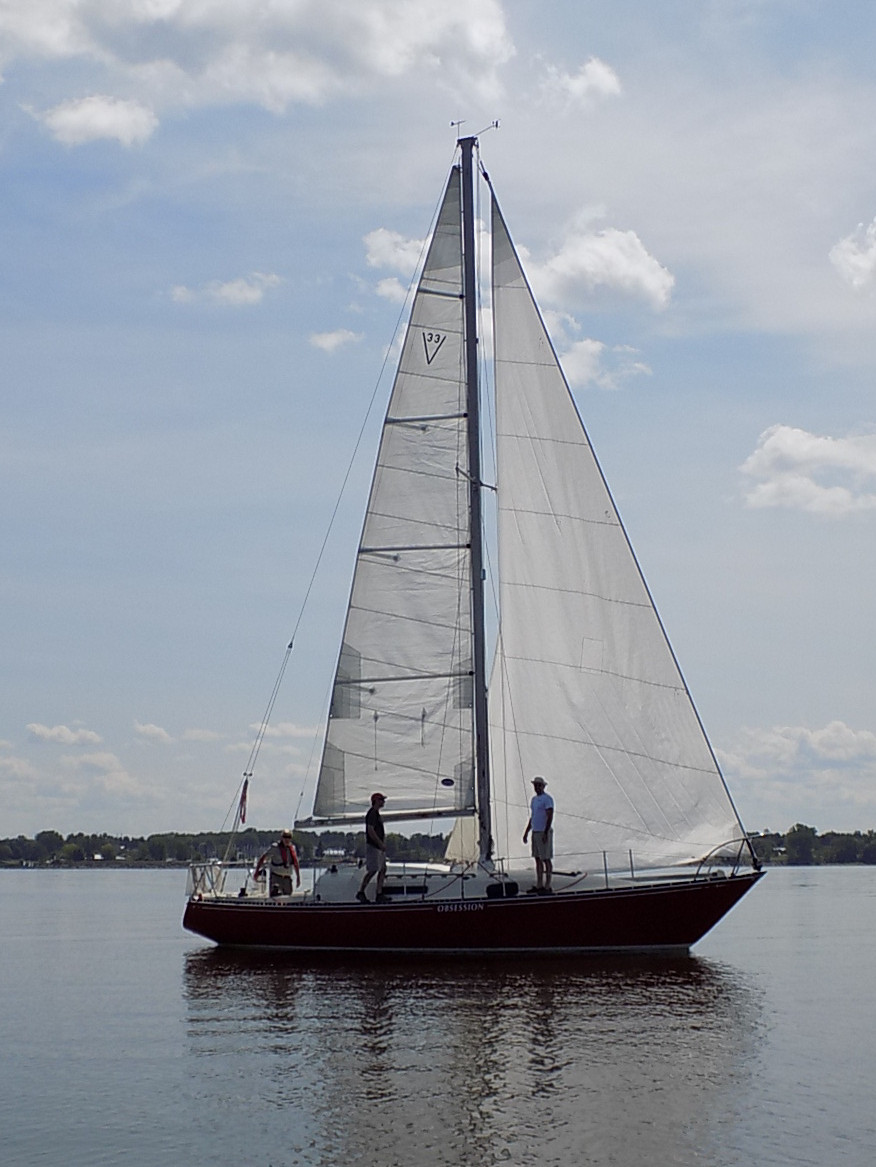
Viking 33

- List of sailing boat types
