= Abbott 33 =

Sailboat class

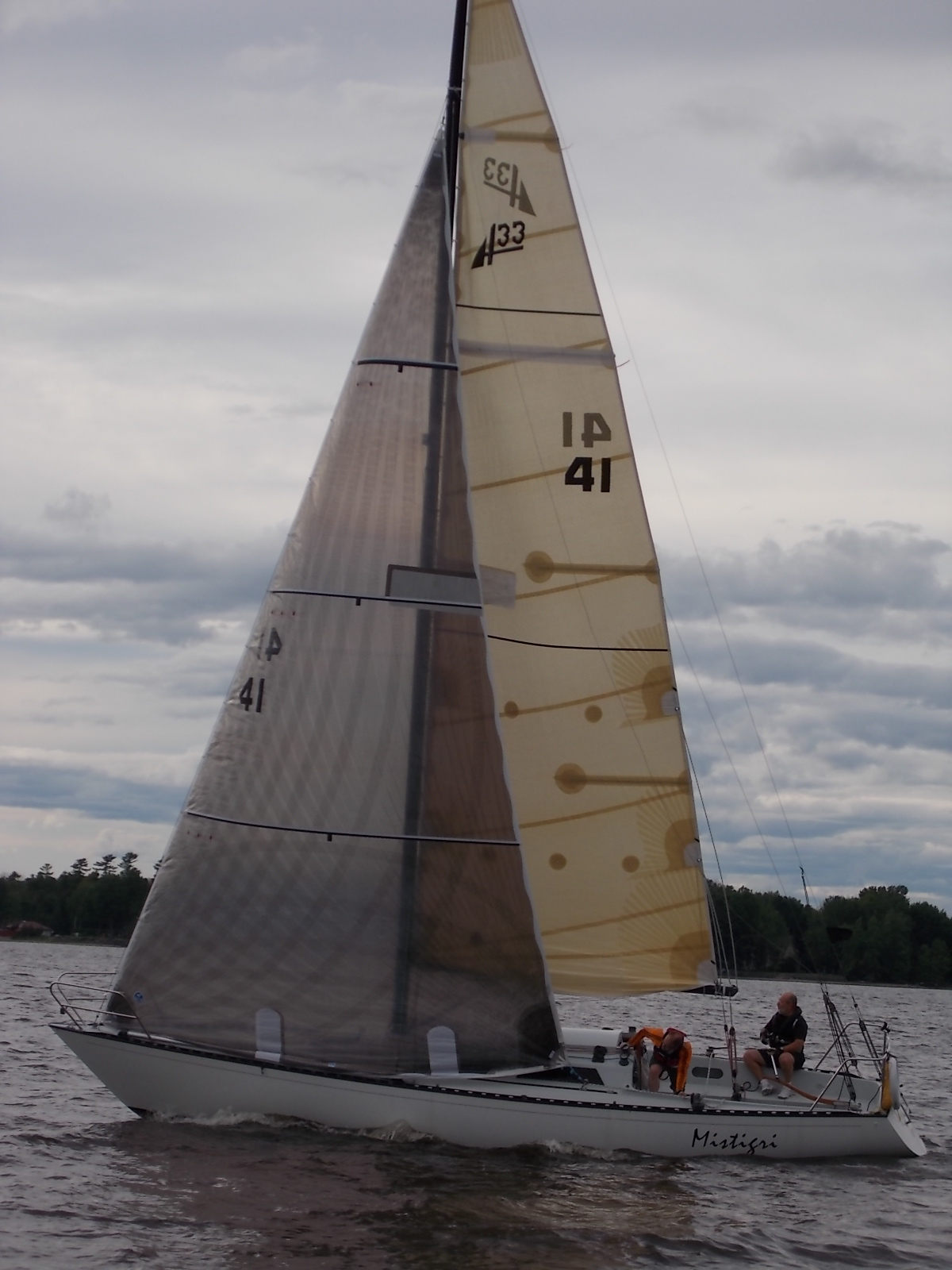

Development
- Designer: Jan Torben Larsen and Abbott Boats
- Location: Canada
- Year: 1980
- No. built: 40
- Builder: Abbott Boats
- Name: Abbott 33

Boat
- Displacement: 6,057 lb (2,747 kg)
- Draft: 5.42 ft (1.65 m)

Hull
- Type: Monohull
- Construction: Fibreglass
- LOA: 33.29 ft (10.15 m)
- LWL: 26.92 ft (8.21 m)
- Beam: 8.21 ft (2.50 m)

Hull appendages
- Keel: fin keel
- Ballast: 3,304 lb (1,499 kg)
- Rudder: internally-mounted spade-type rudder

Rig
- General: Fractional rigged sloop
- I foretriangle height: 36.00 ft (10.97 m)
- J foretriangle base: 11.50 ft (3.51 m)
- P mainsail luff: 38.55 ft (11.75 m)
- E mainsail foot: 11.65 ft (3.55 m)

Sails
- Mainsail area: 224.55 sq ft (20.861 m^{2})
- Jib/genoa area: 207.00 sq ft (19.231 m^{2})
- Total sail area: 431.55 sq ft (40.092 m^{2})

Racing
- PHRF: 126 (average)

The Abbott 33 is a Canadian sailboat, that was designed by Jan Torben Larsen and Abbott Boats and first built in 1981.

The Abbott 33 is a development of Larsen's SCAN-KAP 99 design, which was built in Denmark.

== Production ==
The boat was built by Abbott Boats in Sarnia, Ontario, Canada. The company built 40 examples starting in 1981, but it is now out of production.

== Design ==
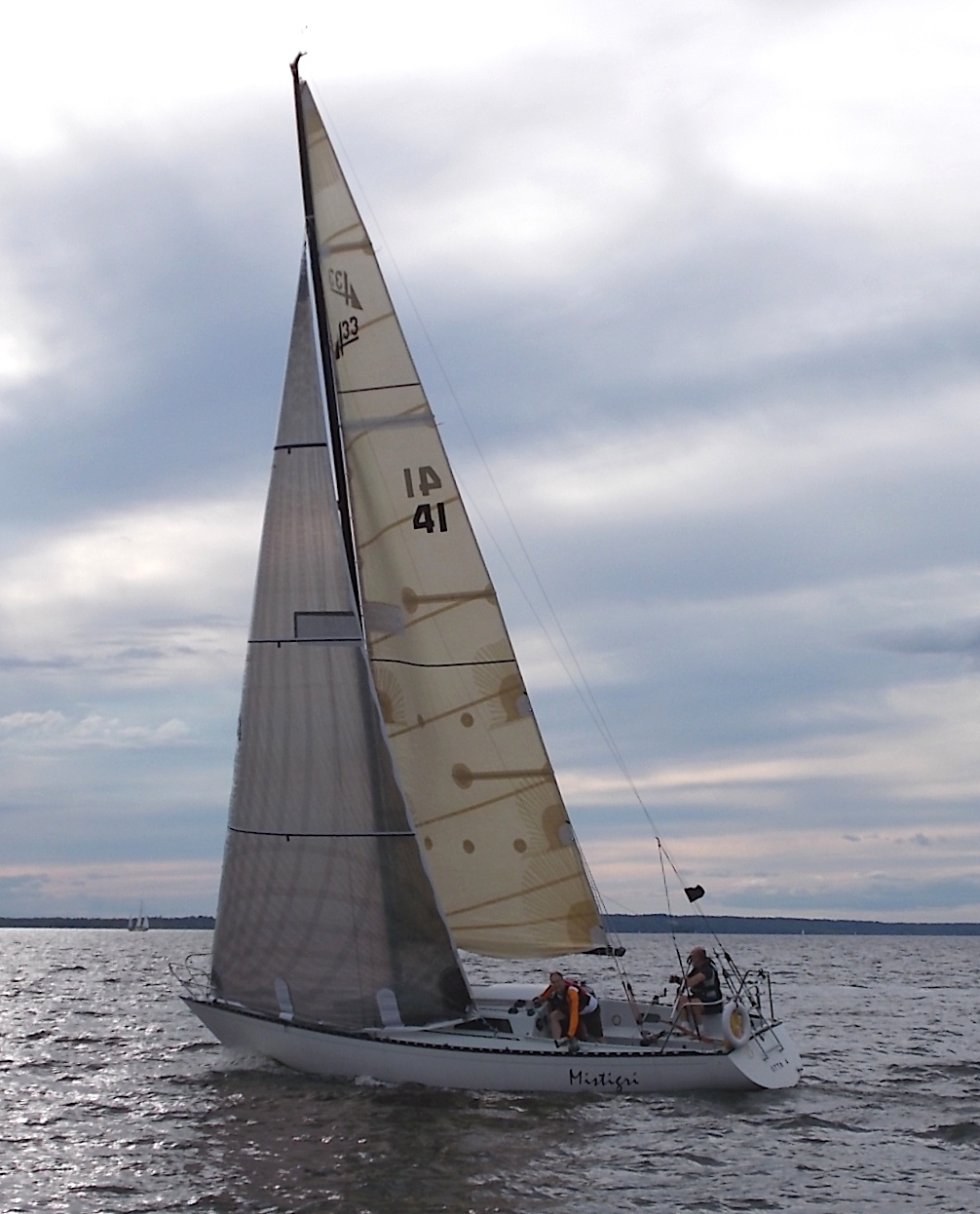
Abbott 33

The Abbott 33 is a small recreational keelboat, built predominantly of fibreglass. It has a fractional sloop rig, an internally-mounted spade-type rudder and a fixed fin keel. It displaces 6,057 lb (2,747 kg) and carries 3,304 lb (1,499 kg) of ballast.

The boat has a draft of 5.42 ft (1.65 m) with the standard keel. The boat is fitted with a fresh water tank with a capacity of 15 U.S. gallons (57 L; 12 imp gal).

The boat has a PHRF racing average handicap of 126 with a high of 132 and low of 120. It has a hull speed of 6.95 kn (12.87 km/h).

== See also ==
- List of sailing boat types
