= CS 33 =

1979–1987 Canadian recreational keelboat

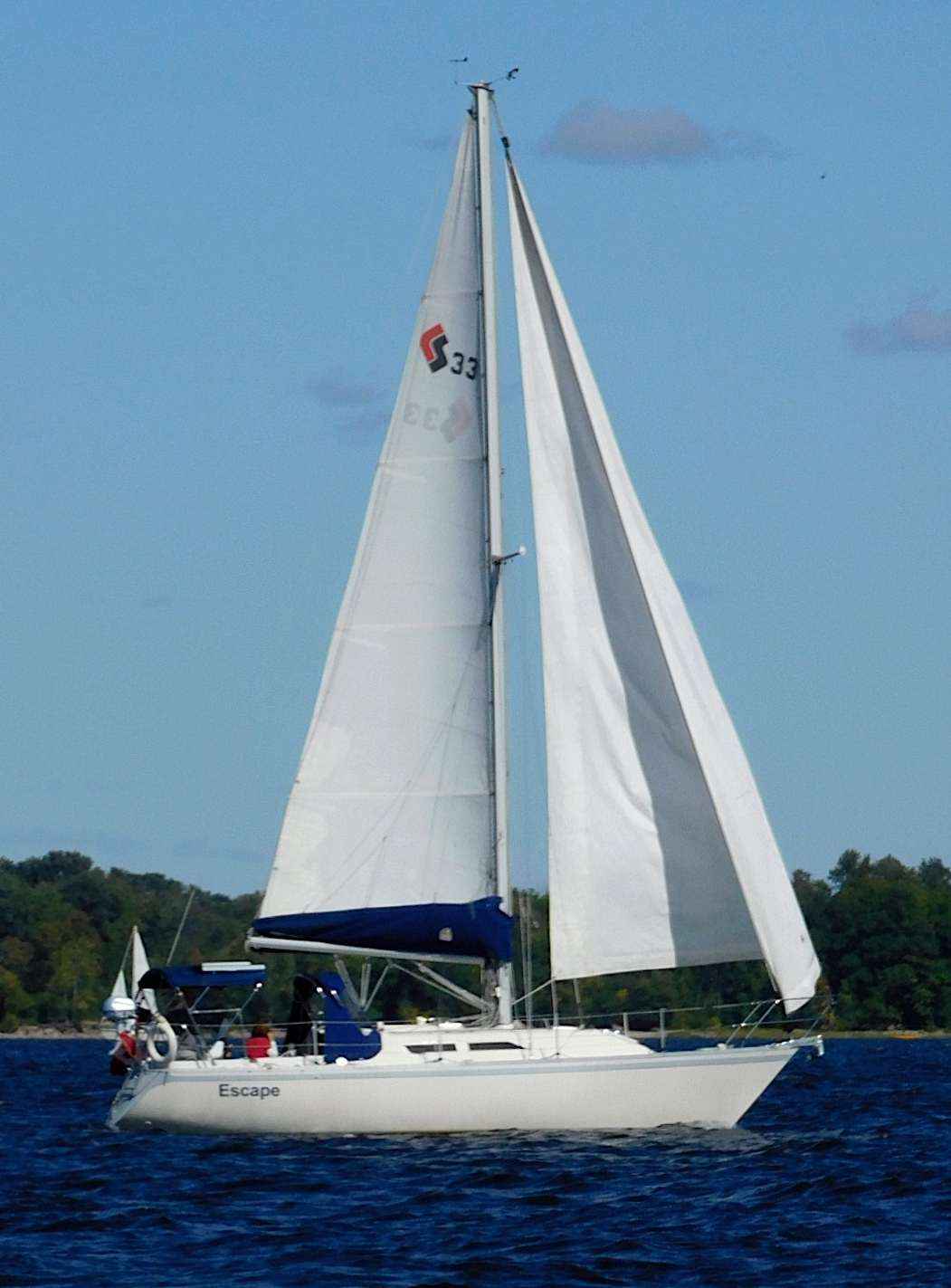

Development
- Designer: Raymond Wall
- Location: Canada
- Year: 1979
- No. built: 450
- Builder: CS Yachts
- Name: CS 33

Boat
- Displacement: 10,000 lb (4,536 kg)
- Draft: 5.80 ft (1.77 m)

Hull
- Type: Monohull
- Construction: Fibreglass
- LOA: 32.67 ft (9.96 m)
- LWL: 26.42 ft (8.05 m)
- Beam: 10.67 ft (3.25 m)
- Engine: Westerbeke 21 hp (16 kW) diesel motor

Hull appendages
- Keel: fin keel
- Ballast: 4,250 lb (1,928 kg)
- Rudder: internally-mounted spade-type rudder

Rig
- General: Masthead sloop
- I foretriangle height: 44.00 ft (13.41 m)
- J foretriangle base: 13.20 ft (4.02 m)
- P mainsail luff: 38.00 ft (11.58 m)
- E mainsail foot: 11.20 ft (3.41 m)

Sails
- Mainsail area: 212.80 sq ft (19.770 m^{2})
- Jib/genoa area: 290.40 sq ft (26.979 m^{2})
- Total sail area: 503.20 sq ft (46.749 m^{2})

Racing
- PHRF: 150 (average)

The CS 33 is a recreational keelboat. CS Yachts in Canada built 450 between 1979 and 1987.

== Design ==
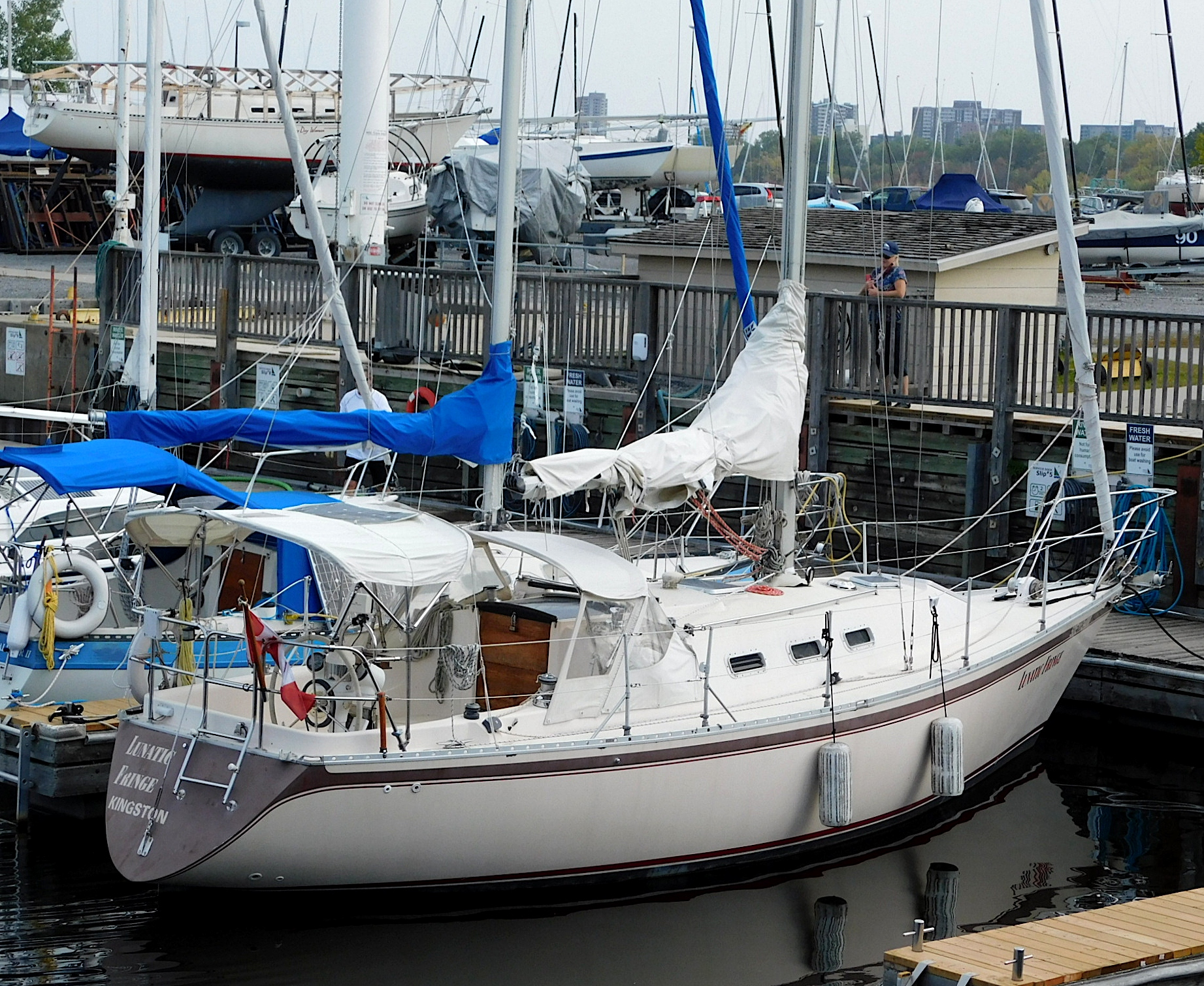
CS 33

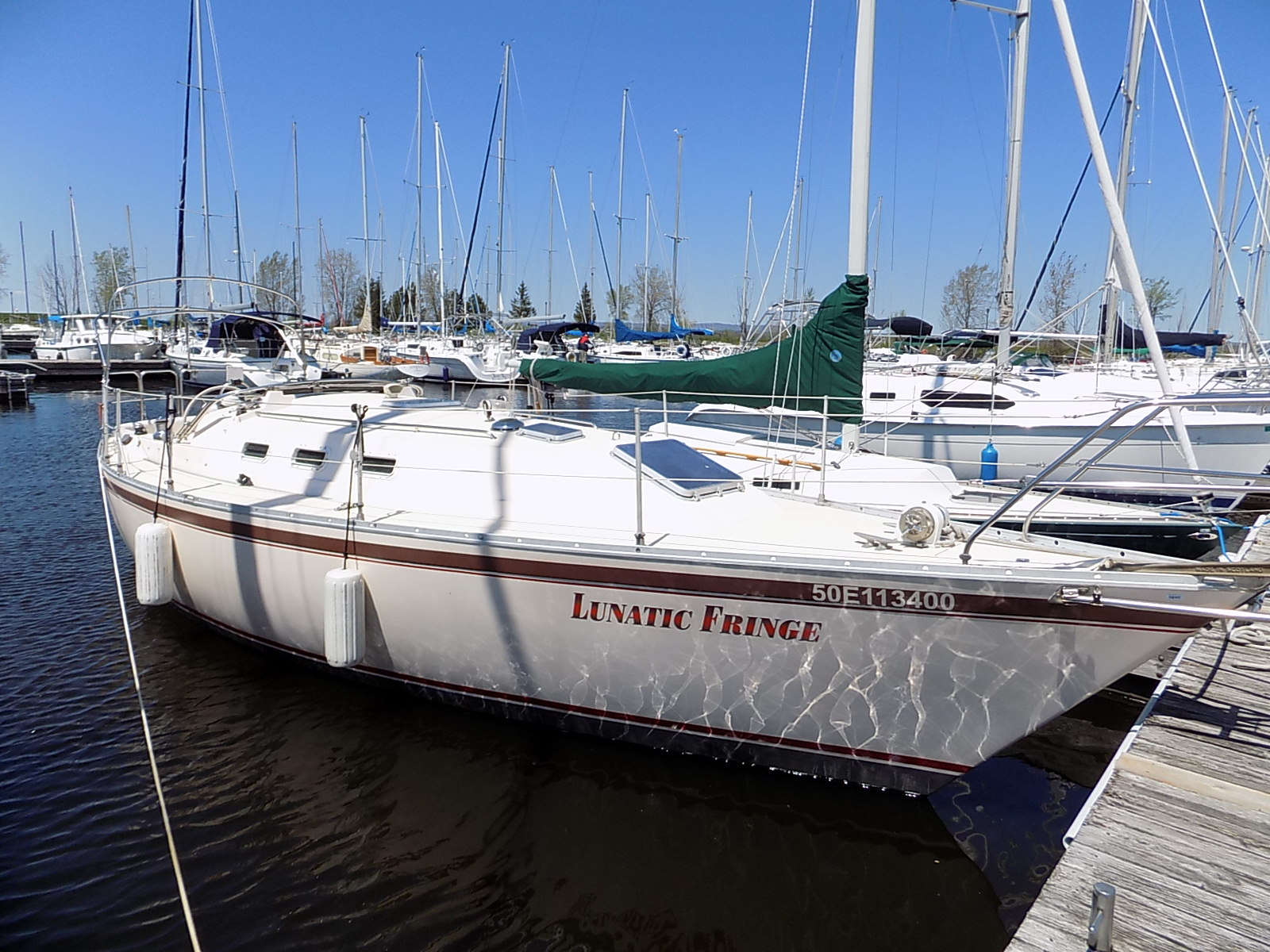
CS 33

The CS 33 is a small recreational keelboat, built predominantly of fibreglass, with wood trim. It has a masthead sloop rig, an internally-mounted spade-type rudder and a fixed fin keel. It displaces 10,000 lb (4,536 kg) and carries 4,250 lb (1,928 kg) of ballast.

The boat has a draft of 5.80 ft (1.77 m) with the standard keel and 4.6 ft (1.4 m) with the optional shoal draft keel.

The boat is fitted with a Westerbeke diesel engine of 21 hp (16 kW). The fuel tank holds 24 U.S. gallons (91 L; 20 imp gal) and the fresh water tank has a capacity of 60 U.S. gallons (230 L; 50 imp gal).

The full keel-equipped model boat has a PHRF racing average handicap of 150 with a high of 162 and low of 147. It has a hull speed of 6.89 kn (12.76 km/h).

The shoal draft keel model boat has a PHRF racing average handicap of 165 with a high of 153 and low of 204.
