= Tanzer 10 =

Sailboat class

Development
- Designer: Dick Carter
- Location: Canada
- Year: 1980
- Builder: Tanzer Industries
- Name: Tanzer 10

Boat
- Crew: Two
- Draft: 6.67 ft (2.03 m) swing keel down

Hull
- Type: Masthead sloop
- Construction: Fibreglass
- LOA: 32.67 ft (9.96 m)
- LWL: 27.50 ft (8.38 m)
- Beam: 11.86 ft (3.61 m)

Hull appendages
- Keel: fixed conventional fin keel or swing keel

The Tanzer 10 is a Canadian sailboat, that was designed by Dick Carter and first built in 1980.

The design was later developed into the Tanzer 10.5.

== Production ==
The boat was built by Tanzer Industries Limited in Dorion, Quebec. The company entered bankruptcy in 1986 and production had ended by then.

== Design ==
The Tanzer 10 is a small recreational keelboat, built predominantly of fibreglass, with wood trim. It has a masthead sloop rig, a transom-hung rudder, wheel steering and a fixed fin keel or optionally a swing keel. The boat displaces 13,000 lb (5,897 kg) and carries 5,000 lb (2,268 kg) of ballast.

The boat is powered by a Japanese-made Yanmar diesel engine. It has a pilothouse and inside steering.

The fixed keel version has a draft of 5.92 ft (1.80 m), while the swing keel version has a draft of 6.67 ft (2.03 m) with the keel down and 2.00 ft (0.61 m) with the keel retracted.

The design has a hull speed of 7.03 kn (13.02 km/h).

== See also ==
- List of sailing boat types
