= Coconut Grove =

Neighborhood of Miami, Florida, United States

- Neighborhood of Miami
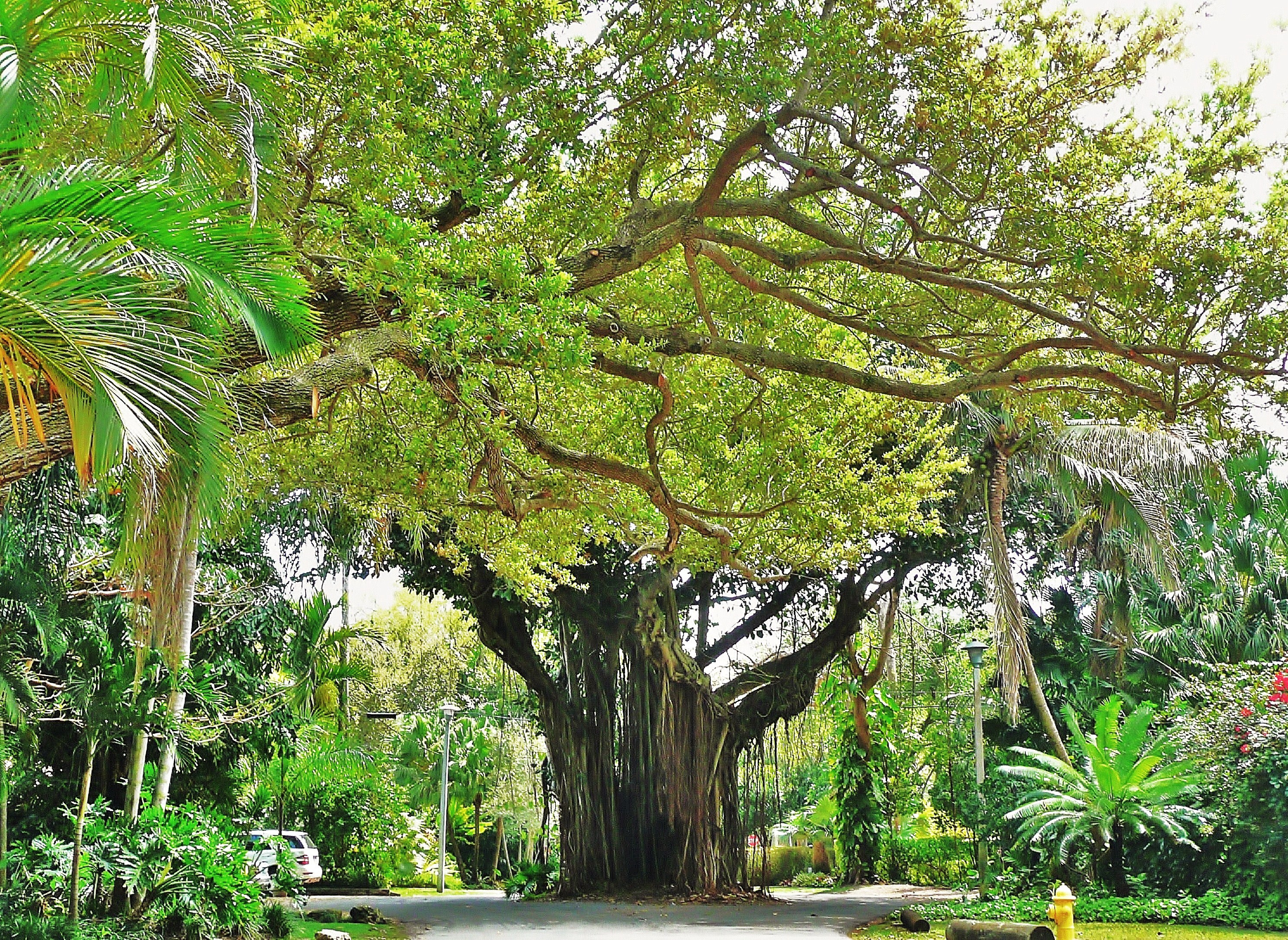
- Typical street in Coconut Grove, showing heavy vegetation characteristic of the hammock
- Nickname: The Grove
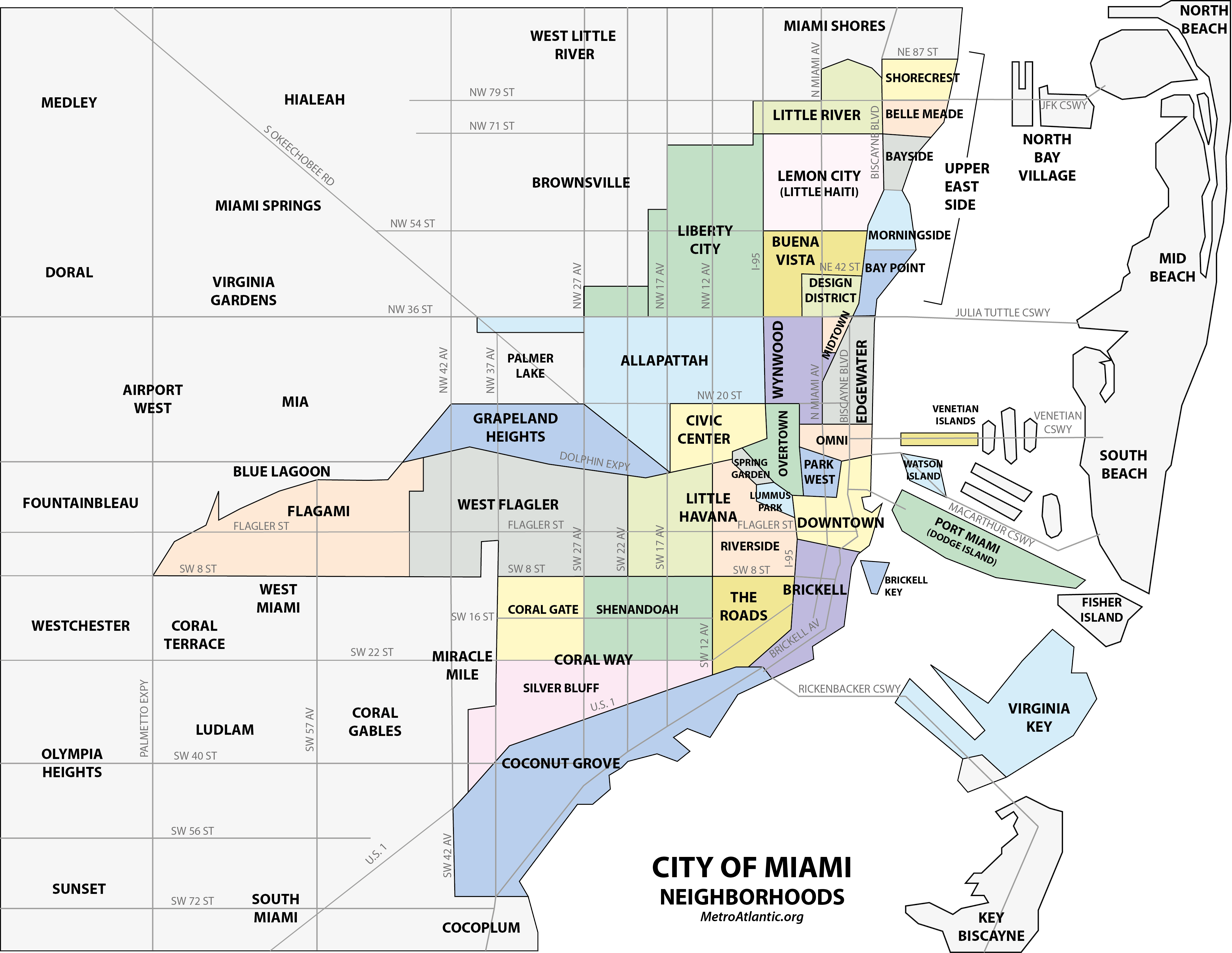
- Neighborhoods of Miami
- Coordinates: 25°43′N 80°15′W
- Country: United States
- State: Florida
- County: Miami-Dade County
- City: Miami
- Settled: 1825
- Annexed into the City of Miami: 1925
- Subdistricts of Coconut Grove: Neighborhoods list: Center Grove; Northeast Coconut Grove; Southwest Coconut Grove; West Grove or Black Grove

Government
  - City of Miami Commissioner: Damian Pardo
  - Miami-Dade Commissioners: Xavier L. Suarez
  - House of Representatives: Vicki Lopez (R)
  - State Senate: Ileana Garcia (R)
  - U.S. House: Maria Elvira Salazar (R)

Area
  - Total: 5.607 sq mi (14.52 km^{2})
- Elevation: 13 ft (4.0 m)
- Highest elevation: 24 ft (7.3 m)

Population (2010)
  - Total: 20,076
  - Density: 8,006/sq mi (3,091/km^{2})
  - Demonym: Grovite
- Time zone: UTC−05 (EST)
- ZIP Code: 33133
- Area codes: 305, 786
- Website: www.coconutgrove.com

Coconut Grove, also known colloquially as "The Grove", is the oldest continuously inhabited neighborhood of Miami in Miami-Dade County, Florida. It is roughly bounded by North Prospect Drive to the south, LeJeune Road to the west, South Dixie Highway (US 1) and Rickenbacker Causeway to the north, and Biscayne Bay to the east. It is south of the neighborhoods of Brickell and The Roads and east of Coral Gables. The neighborhood's name has been sometimes spelled "Cocoanut Grove" but the definitive spelling "Coconut Grove" was established when the city was incorporated in 1919.

What is now called Coconut Grove was formed in 1925 when the city of Miami annexed two areas of about equal size, the city of Coconut Grove and most of the town of Silver Bluff. Coconut Grove approximately corresponds to the same area as the 33133 ZIP Code although the ZIP Code includes parts of Coral Way and Coral Gables and a small part of ZIP Code 33129. Coconut Grove locals take pride that it is one of Miami's greenest areas.

Coconut Grove is served by the Miami Metrorail at Coconut Grove and Douglas Road stations.

== History ==
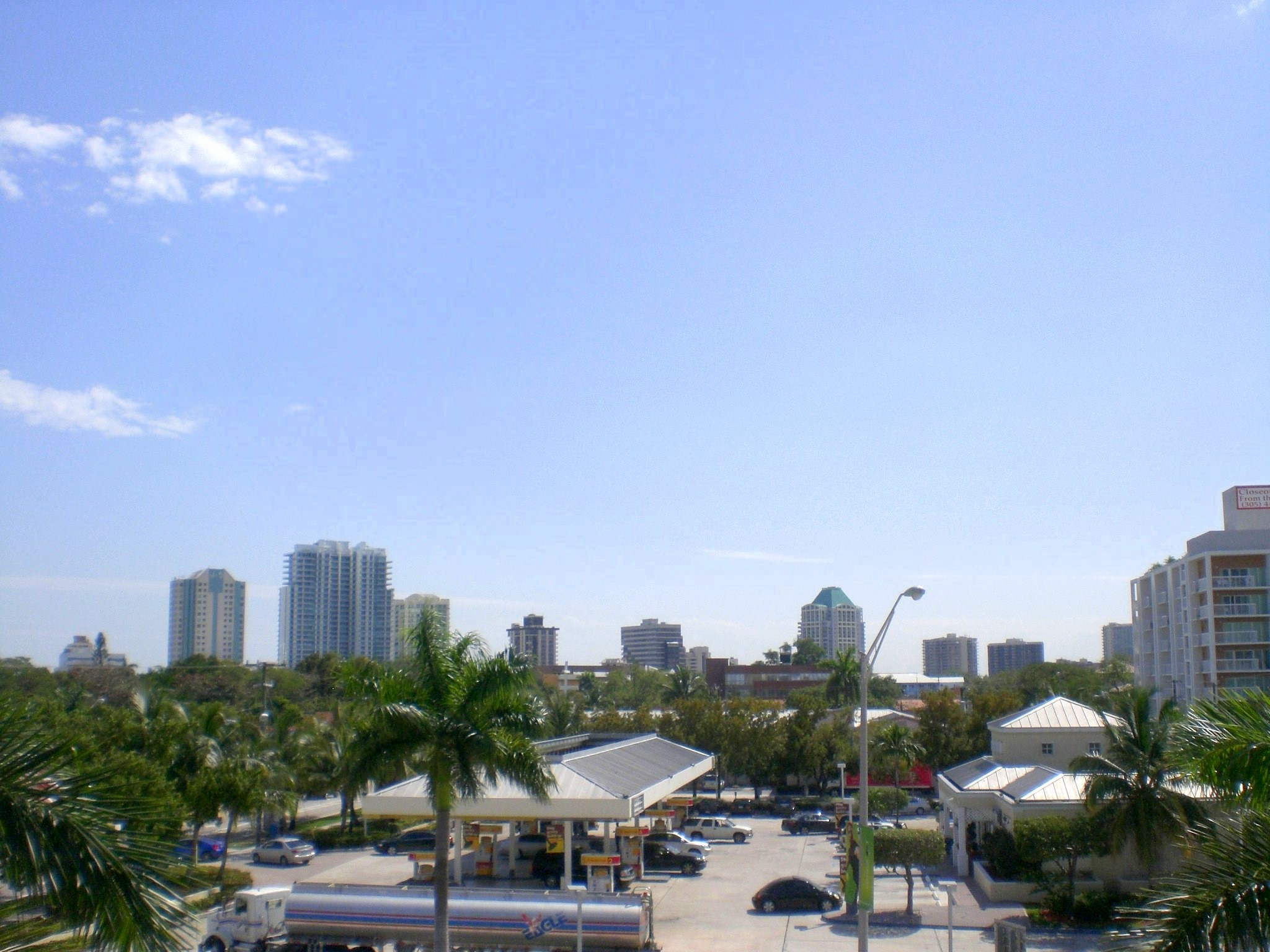
Skyline of Coconut Grove, as seen from its respective Metrorail station

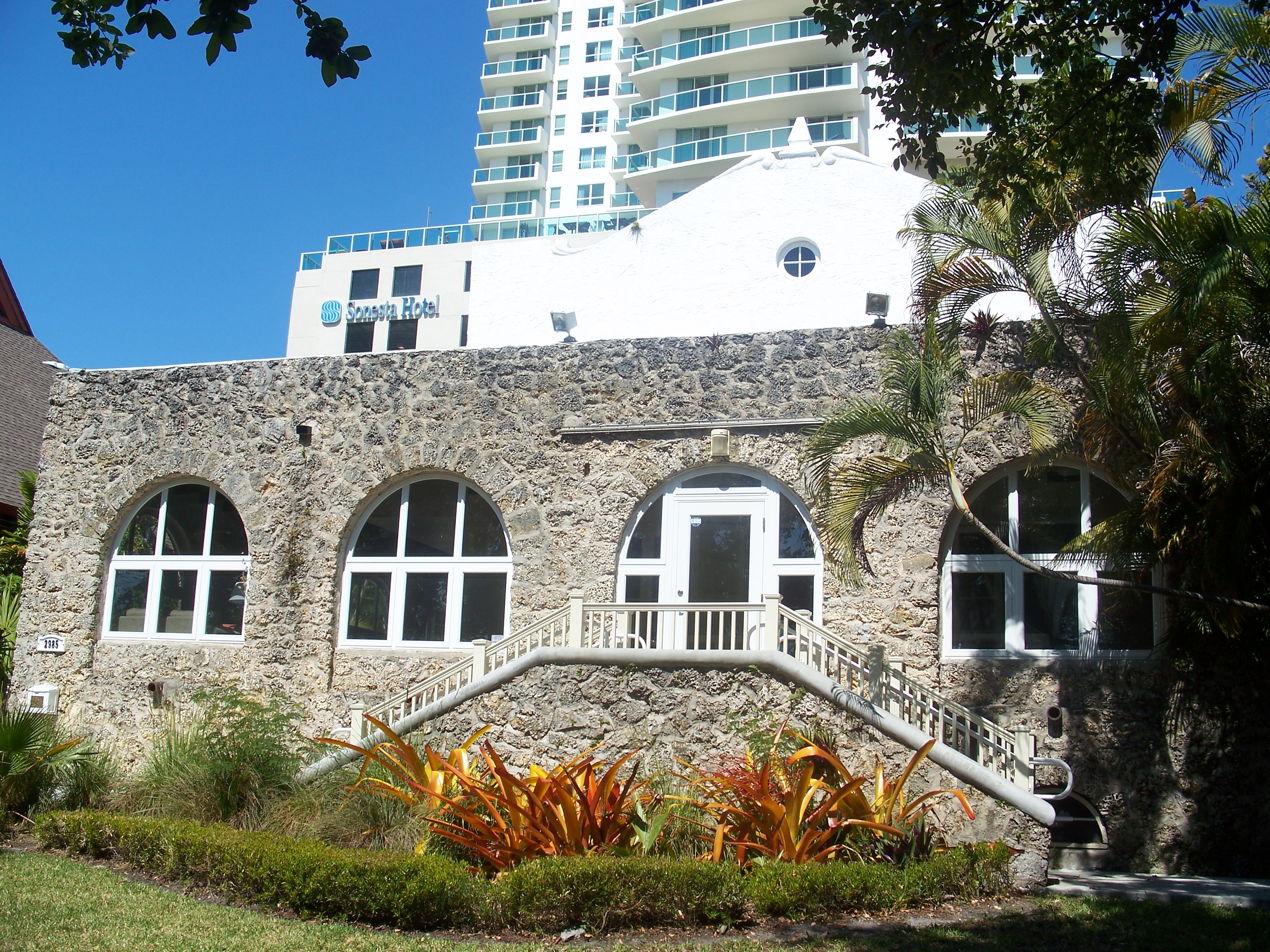
The clubhouse of the Woman's Club of Coconut Grove, built in 1921 and designed by Miami architect Walter de Garmo

Several waves of immigration established Coconut Grove, the first in 1825, when the Cape Florida lighthouse went into operation, kept by John Dubose. The settlers primarily came from the Northeastern United States, in addition to Britain and the Bahamas. They included sailors, naturalists, and artists. Many Black Bahamian immigrants were hired to construct the historical landmarks in and around Coconut Grove. They were believed to be the only people capable of withstanding the extreme heat and humidity, as well as the large mosquito population.

Horace P. Porter is credited for coming up with the name when, in 1873, he rented a home from Edmond D. Beasley's widow, who homesteaded 160 acres of bay-front property. Porter lived there for only a year, but during that time he established a post office he named "Coconut Grove".

The first hotel on the South Florida mainland was in Coconut Grove. Called the Bay View Inn (later renamed the Peacock Inn), it was built in 1882 on the site of present-day Peacock Park by English immigrants Isabella and Charles Peacock, who had owned a wholesale meat business in London. Coconut Grove's first Black settlement, in the 1880s, was established by Bahamian laborers who worked at the Peacock Inn. The Barnacle Historic State Park is the oldest house in Miami-Dade County still standing in its original location. It was built in 1891, and was home to yacht designer Ralph Middleton Munroe, also known as "The Commodore" for being the first commodore and founder of the Biscayne Bay Yacht Club.

Formerly an independent city, Coconut Grove was annexed by Miami in 1925. In the 1960s, bay-shore Coconut Grove served as the center of South Florida's youth countercultural movement, notably hosting several love-ins and concerts (including a now-infamous Doors concert at Dinner Key Auditorium) during the latter part of the decade. The Bahamian community grew in Coconut Grove through the 1970s.

A surge of commercial development in Coconut Grove was driven by the construction of three major residential complexes during the late 1970s and early 1980s: Yacht Harbour Condominiums in 1975; Grove Isle, a condominium, club, and hotel complex, in 1979; and L'Hermitage in 1980. This was followed by the opening of 2575 S. Bayshore Drive in 1982 and the 1983 opening of Grove Towers. Further development was proposed for Grove Isle in 2013.

== Economy ==
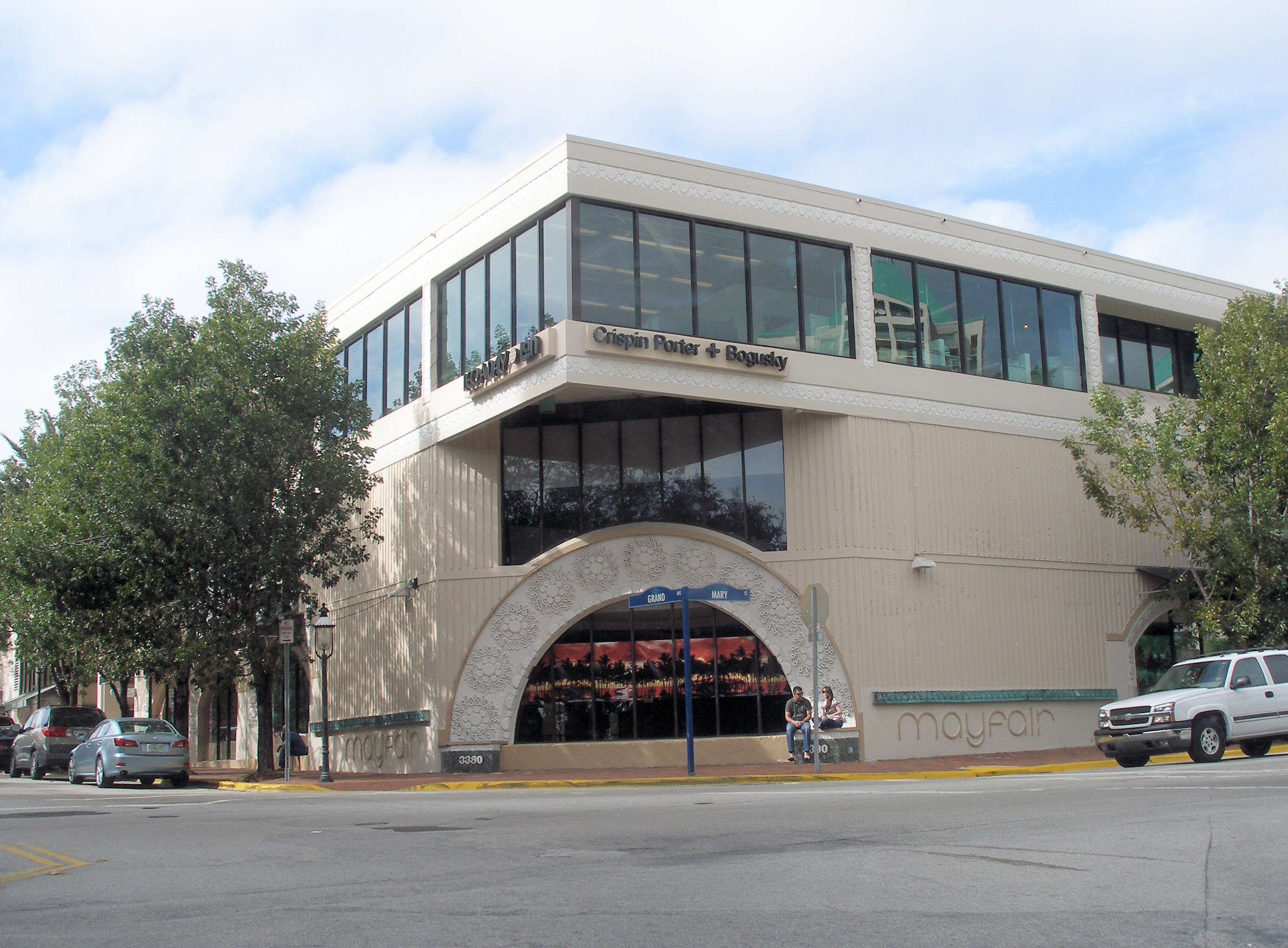
Mayfair in Coconut Grove

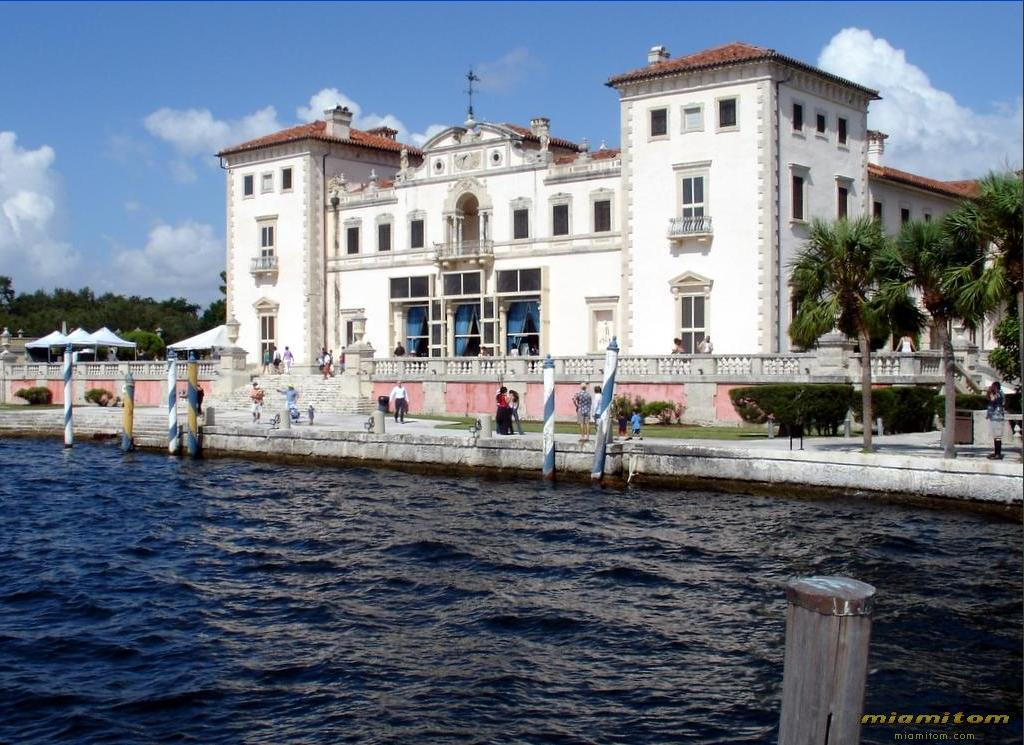
Villa Vizcaya, built in 1916, is a popular Miami tourist attraction.

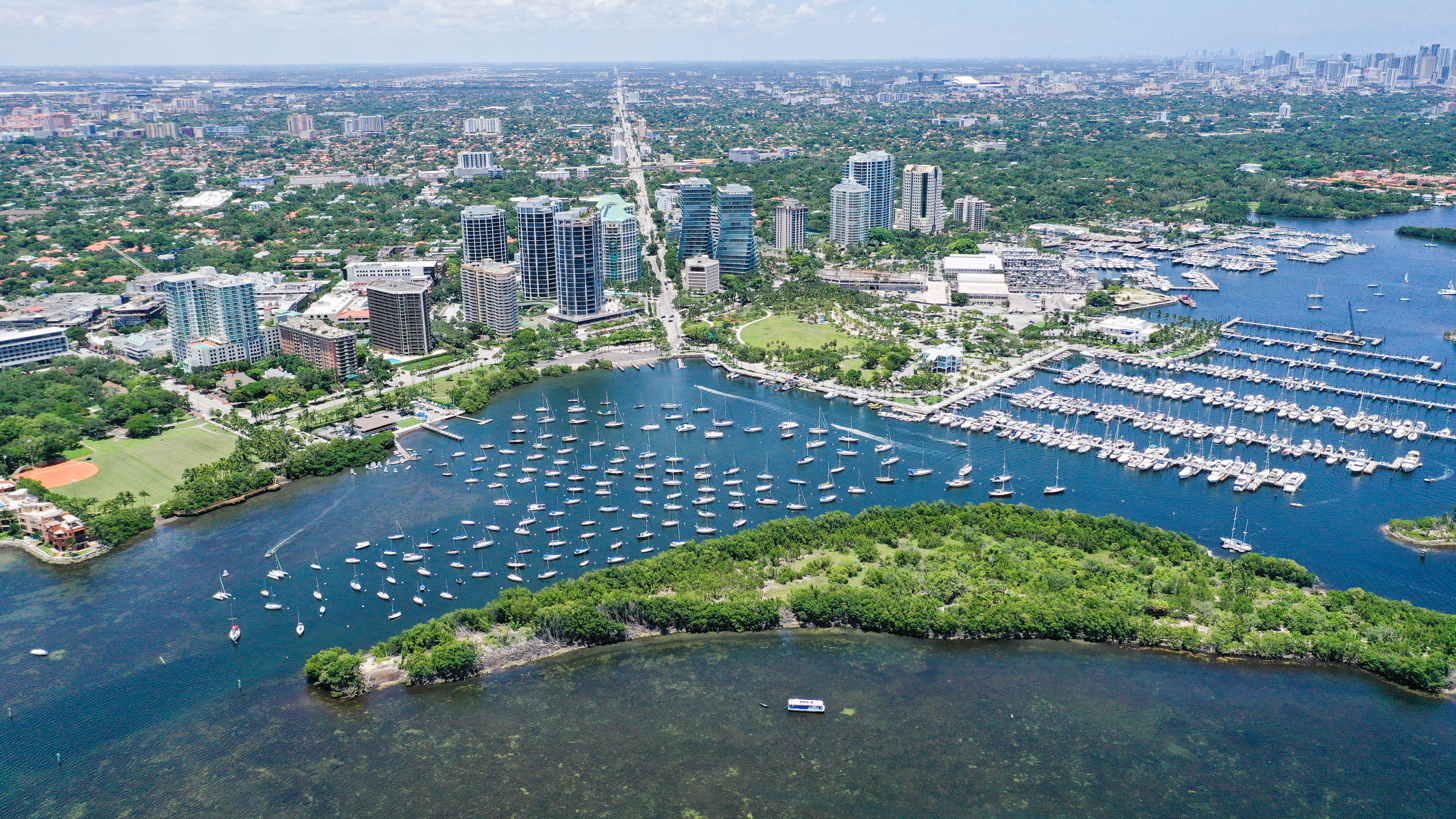
Downtown Coconut Grove in 2019

Coconut Grove has a number of outdoor festivals and events, the most prominent of which is the annual Coconut Grove Arts Festival. Others include the King Mango Strut, which began as a parody of the Orange Bowl Parade and is held on the last Sunday in December. The Great Taste of the Grove Food & Wine Festival takes place in April. In June, the Goombay Festival transforms Grand Avenue into a Carnaval celebrating Bahamian culture, with Bahamian food and Caribbean music (Junkanoo).

The Grove has numerous restaurants, open-air and streetside cafes, and bars. It is a center of nightlife frequented by locals, young professionals, University of Miami and Florida International University students, and tourists.

Shopping is abundant in the Grove, with two open-air malls, CocoWalk, the Streets of Mayfair, and many other street shops and boutiques.

The Village Center, the three blocks radiating from the intersection of Main, McFarland, and Grand Avenues, home to most of the Grove's retail and restaurant businesses, is also home to three gyms, a multiplex movie house in CocoWalk, several parking garages, a state historic site, an elementary school, a City of Miami fire station, several large condos and residential rental towers, the Coconut Grove Post Office, and two sizable parks. Development and redevelopment continue to redefine and transform the area.

Major corporations including Arquitectonica, Spanish Broadcasting System, and Watsco are located in the Grove.

The eastern border of Coconut Grove is Biscayne Bay, which lends itself to the local boating and sailing communities. The area features the Coconut Grove Sailing Club, Biscayne Bay Yacht Club, a sizable municipal marina, and Dinner Key Marina. The US Sailing Center is on the Bay between Kennedy Park and the Coral Reef Yacht Club. Pan Am's seaplane operations were based at Dinner Key, and Miami City Hall is based in the old Pan Am terminal building.

== Demographics ==
Demographically, Coconut Grove is divided into Northeast Coconut Grove and Southwest Coconut Grove. As of the 2000 census, the population of the entire neighborhood was between 18,953 and 19,646. The area includes the zip codes 33129 and 33133, covering 5.607 square miles (14.52 km²). The population consists of 9,695 males and 9,951 females. The median age for males was 38.4 years, while for females it was 40.3 years. The average household size was 2.1 people, and the average family size was 2.8 members. Among all households, 33.6% were married-couple families, 11.1% were married-couple families with children, and 7.6% were single-mother households. Additionally, 18.3% of males aged 15 and over had never married, compared to 14.3% of females in the same age group.

Approximately 8.1% of the population spoke English either "not well" or "not at all." Regarding birthplace, 31.6% of residents were born in Florida, 34.7% were born in another U.S. state, and 2.3% were native residents born outside the U.S. The percentage of foreign-born residents was 31.4%.

As of 2000, Northeast Grove had a population of 9,812 residents, with 5,113 households, and 2,221 families residing in the neighborhood. The median household income was $63,617.82. The racial makeup of the neighborhood was 35.24% Hispanic or Latino of any race, 2.25% Black or African American, 60.96% White (non-Hispanic), and 1.55% other races (non-Hispanic).

As of 2000, Southwest Grove had a population of 9,141 residents, with 3,477 households, and 2,082 families residing in the neighborhood. The median household income was $63,617.82. The racial makeup of the neighborhood was 14.80% Hispanic or Latino of any race, 48.27% Black or African American, 35.27% White (non-Hispanic), and 1.66% other races (non-Hispanic).

The "West" Grove (Black Grove) is predominantly composed of people who are of Afro-Bahamian descent. Bahamian sailors were one of the first groups of settlers in the area. The Goombay festival is a celebration of the rich history of this historically Bahamian neighborhood.

== Transportation ==
Coconut Grove is served by Metrobus throughout the area, and by the Miami Metrorail at:

- Vizcaya (SW 32nd Road and U.S. 1)
- Coconut Grove (SW 27th Avenue and U.S. 1)
- Douglas Road (SW 37th Avenue and U.S. 1)

Metrobus's Coconut Grove Connection connects at Coconut Grove and Douglas Road stations, going to many popular areas in the Grove, including CocoWalk and Peacock Park.

== Education and institutions ==
=== Cultural institutions ===
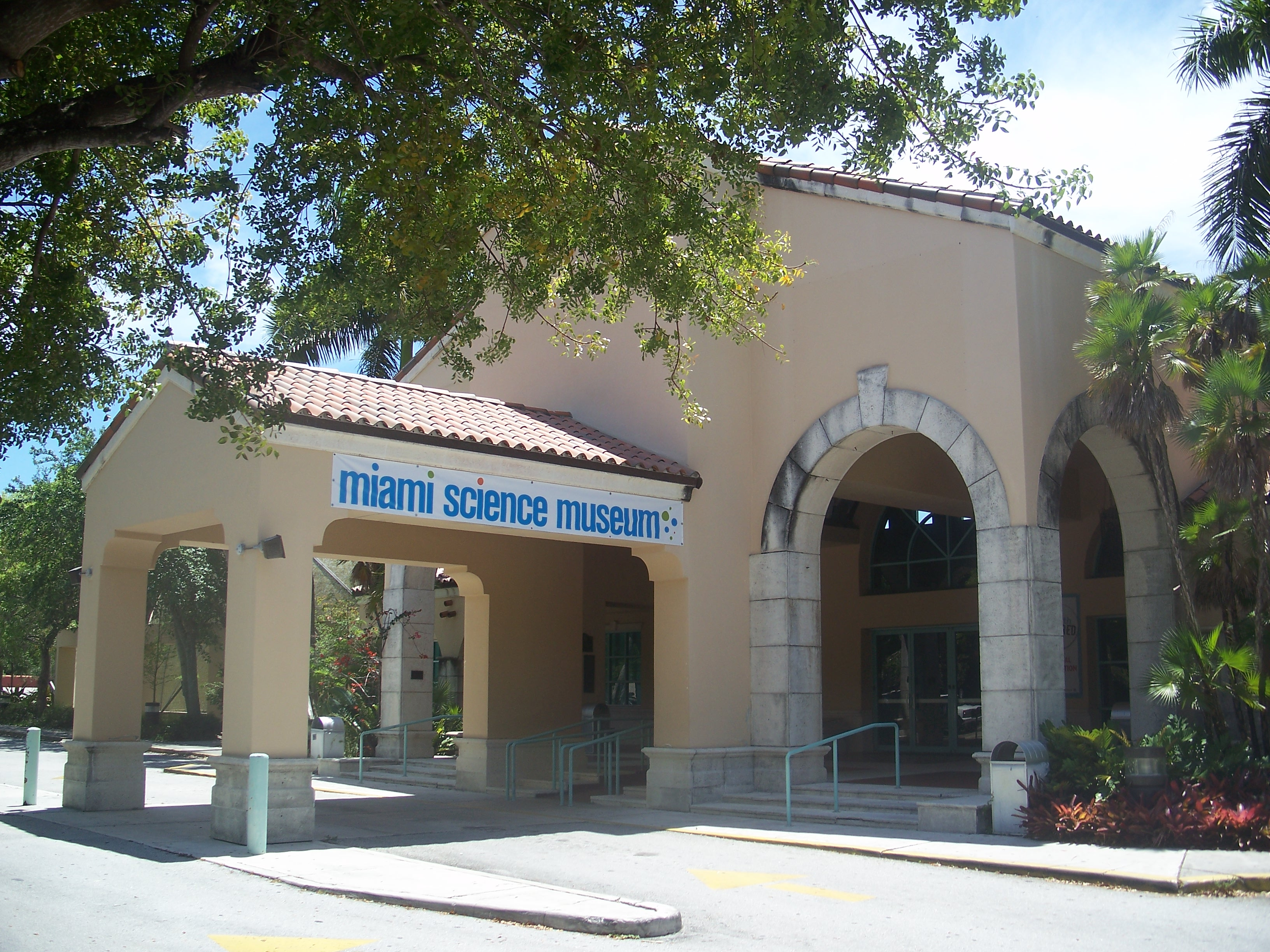
Miami Science Museum

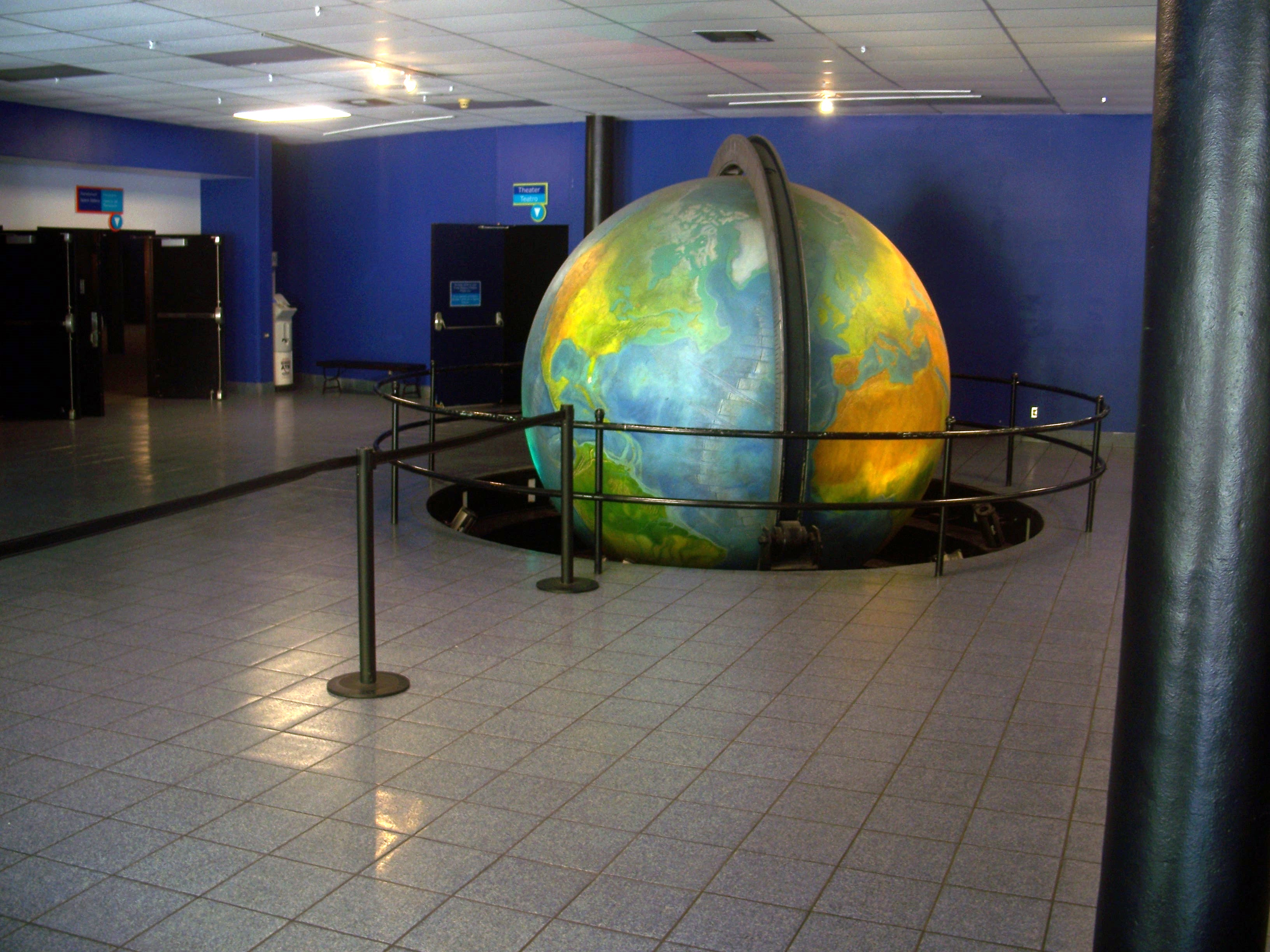
Interior of Miami Science Museum

- Coconut Grove Playhouse
- Marjory Stoneman Douglas Home
- Miami Science Museum, moved to downtown Miami
- The Barnacle Historic State Park
- The Kampong
- Vizcaya Museum and Gardens

==== Libraries ====
- Miami-Dade Public Library operates area public libraries

=== Schools ===
==== Elementary schools ====
Miami-Dade County Public Schools operates area public schools:

- Coconut Grove Elementary School
- Dade County Training School (1899–1937)
- Frances S. Tucker Elementary School
- George W. Carver Elementary School

==== Middle schools ====
- George Washington Carver School in Coral Gables serves Coconut Grove. As a magnet school, it does not admit most of its students based on geography, but minimum quotas apply to serving Coconut Grove.

==== High schools ====
- Bridgeprep Academy of Arts and Minds (2003–2018)
- George Washington Carver School

==== Private schools ====
- Ransom Everglades School, founded in 1903
- St. Hugh Catholic School, 1956
- Immaculata-Lasalle High School, 1958
- St. Stephen's Episcopal Day School, 1958
- Carrollton School of the Sacred Heart, 1961
- Coconut Grove Montessori School
- Vanguard School

== Points of interest ==
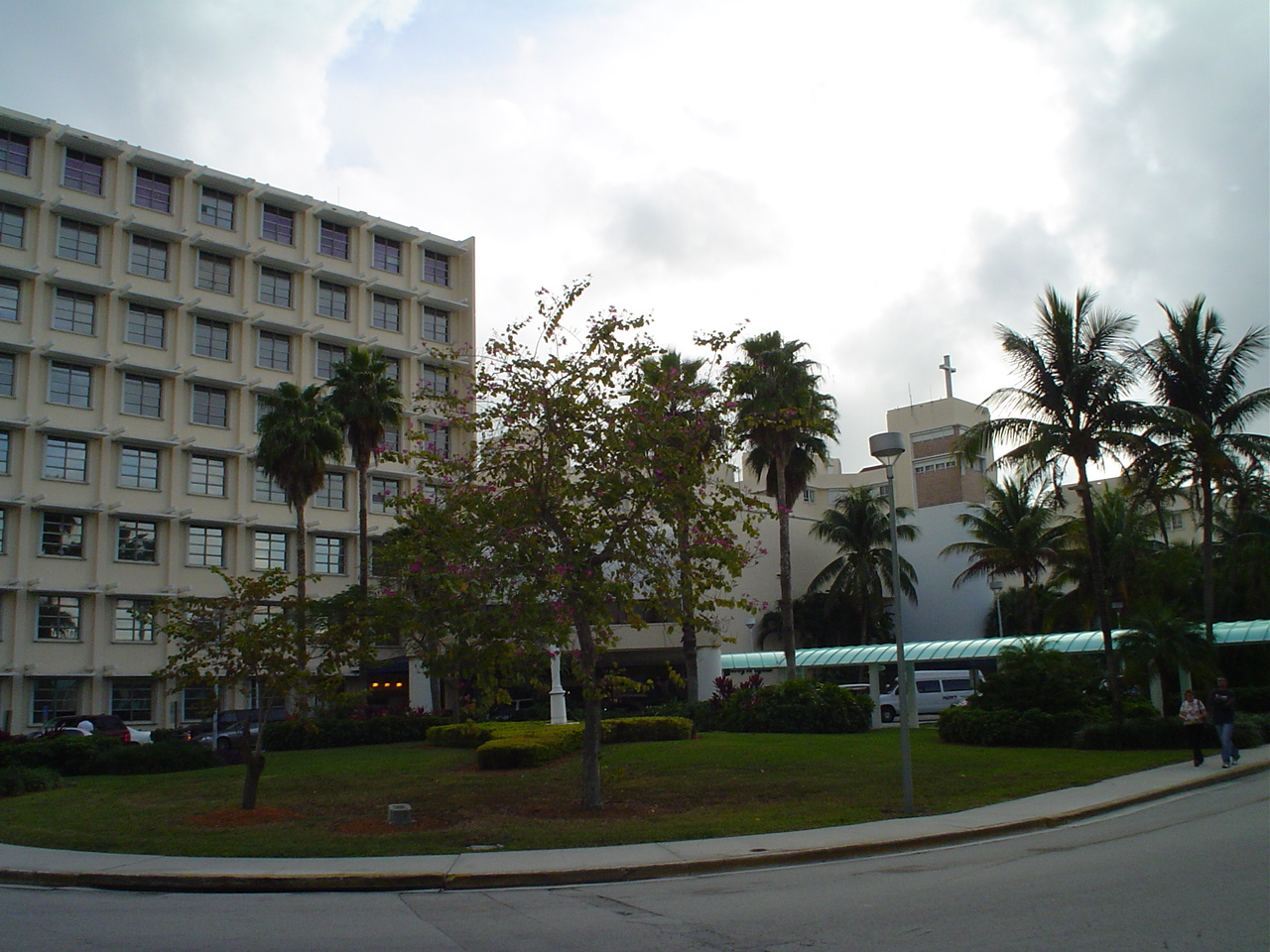
Mercy Hospital in Cocunut Grove

- Charles Avenue
- CocoWalk
- Dinner Key
- First Coconut Grove School
- Grove Isle
- Mercy Hospital
- Miami City Hall
- Plymouth Congregational Church
- Trapp Homestead
- Woman's Club of Coconut Grove

== Parks ==
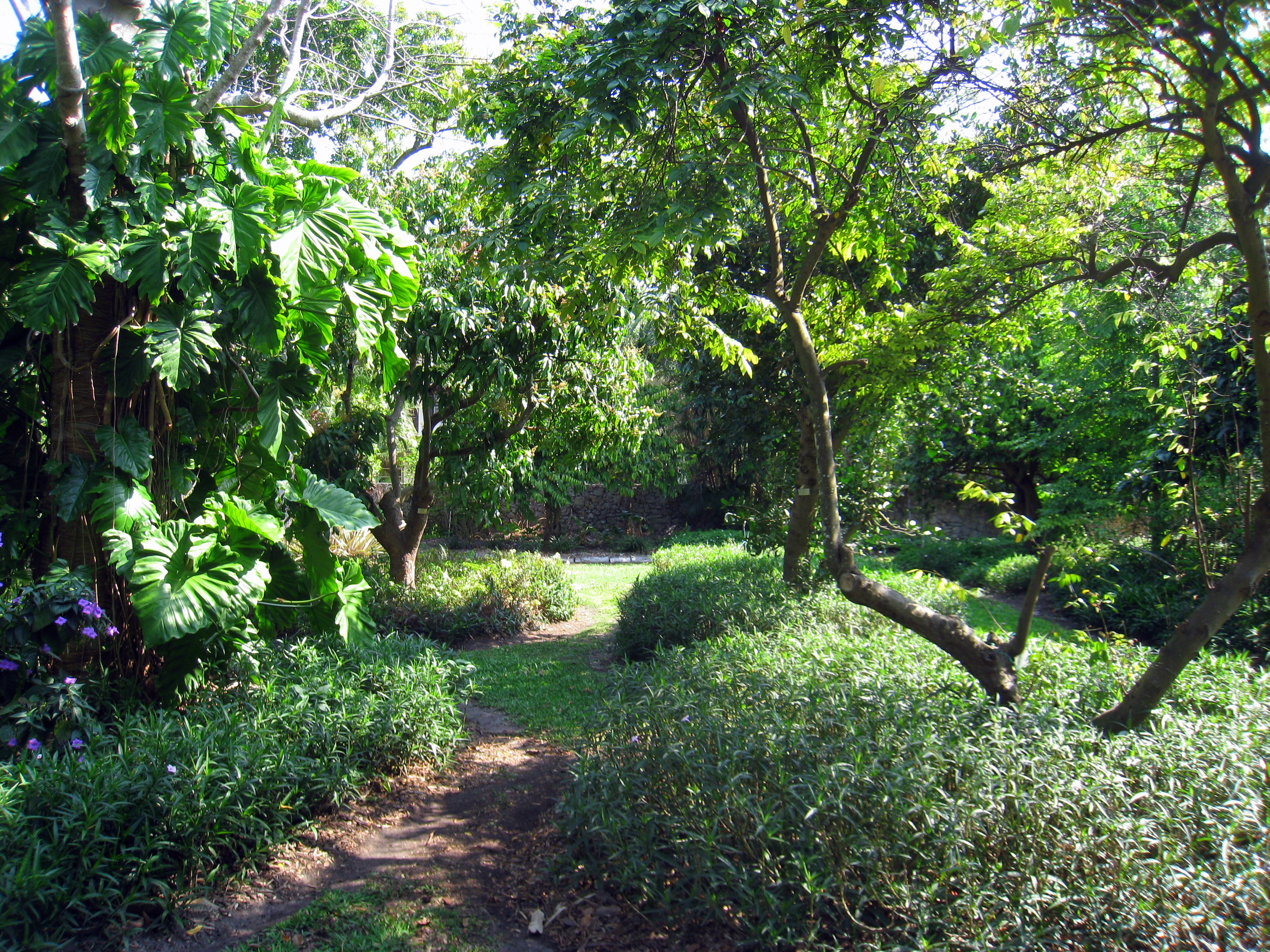
The Kampong, a botanical garden in the Grove known for its wild foliage and large tree coverage

- The Kampong: an 8-acre (32,000m^{2}) tropical garden that forms part of the National Tropical Botanical Garden
- The Barnacle Historic State Park: Built in the late 19th century, the former home of Ralph Middleton Munroe is the oldest home in Miami-Dade County still standing in its original location and is on the shore of Biscayne Bay. The forest surrounding the home is tropical hardwood hammock and the last of its kind in the area. The unique architecture includes period furniture and wide porches with magnificent views.
- Peacock Park and Kenneth Myers Bayside Park
- David Kennedy Park
- Merrie Christmas Park
- Steele Park
- Blanche Park
- Elizabeth Virrick Park
- Kirk Munroe Park
- Coconut Grove Park
- Grand Avenue Park
- Ingraham Terrace Park
- Sunrise Park
- Marjory Stoneman Douglas Mini Park
- Dinner Key Picnic Islands Park
- Alice Wainwright Park

== Notable people ==
Former and current residents include:

- Hervey Allen, author of Anthony Adverse
- Leo Baekeland, inventor of Bakelite
- Charles H. Baker, Jr., food and drink author
- Alexander Graham Bell, father of Marion Hubbard Bell Fairchild, who with her husband David Fairchild, resided at The Kampong
- Rynn Berry, vegan author and historian, was reared here (after his birth in Honolulu, Hawaii).
- William Jennings Bryan, U.S. Secretary of State
- Neal Colzie, NFL cornerback
- Amari Cooper, Buffalo Bills wide receiver
- Sepy Dobronyi, sculptor, movie producer, jeweler
- Christian de la Huerta, author, spiritual and LGBT leader
- Marjory Stoneman Douglas, author and environmentalist
- David Fairchild, botanist
- Henry Field, noted Middle Eastern archaeologist, anthropologist
- Robert Frost, Pulitzer Prize-winning poet, taught at University of Miami
- Frank Gore, San Francisco 49ers running back
- Gilbert Grosvenor, founder & president of the National Geographic Society
- Howard Hughes, billionaire business mogul
- LeBron James, basketball player for the Miami Heat from 2010 to 2014
- Peter B. Lewis, businessman
- Katt Williams, comedian
- Madonna, singer, songwriter, actress, and businesswoman 1992–2000
- Mia Michaels, television star
- Kirk Munroe, author of children's books
- Ralph Middleton Munroe, yacht designer, builder of the oldest house in Miami, now the Barnacle Historic State Park; 1886–1933
- Fred Neil, American folk recording artist
- Lincoln O'Barry, filmmaker and activist
- John Hart Ely, legal scholar
- Ric O'Barry, dolphin activist; star of movie/documentary The Cove
- Alfred Browning Parker, architect
- Steven Raichlen, grill chef and author
- Jorge Ramos, journalist and author
- Mark Richt, head coach of Miami Hurricanes football 2016–2019
- Winston E. Scott, Captain, USN, Ret.; former NASA astronaut
- Christian Slater, actor, voice actor, and producer 2013–2022
- Sylvester Stallone, actor, director, screenwriter, and producer 1993–1999
- Penny Thompson, organized and promoted women's inter-continental air shows and races in 1940s - 1950s
- Tennessee Williams, playwright

== Historic Coconut Grove ==
Established in 1825, Coconut Grove is one of Miami's oldest neighborhoods. Many of Miami's oldest buildings and homes are there, including:

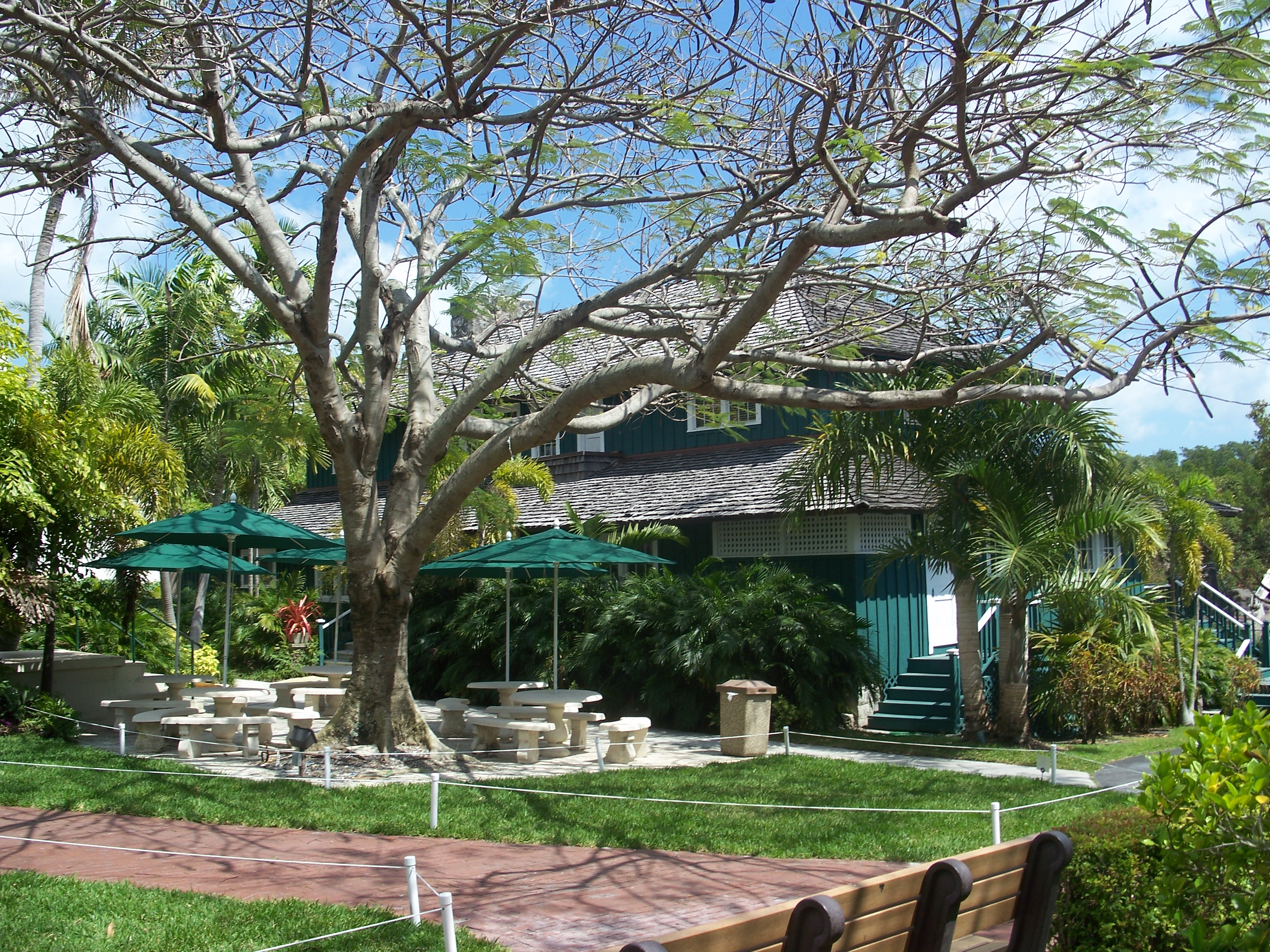
Ransom School "Pagoda", 1902

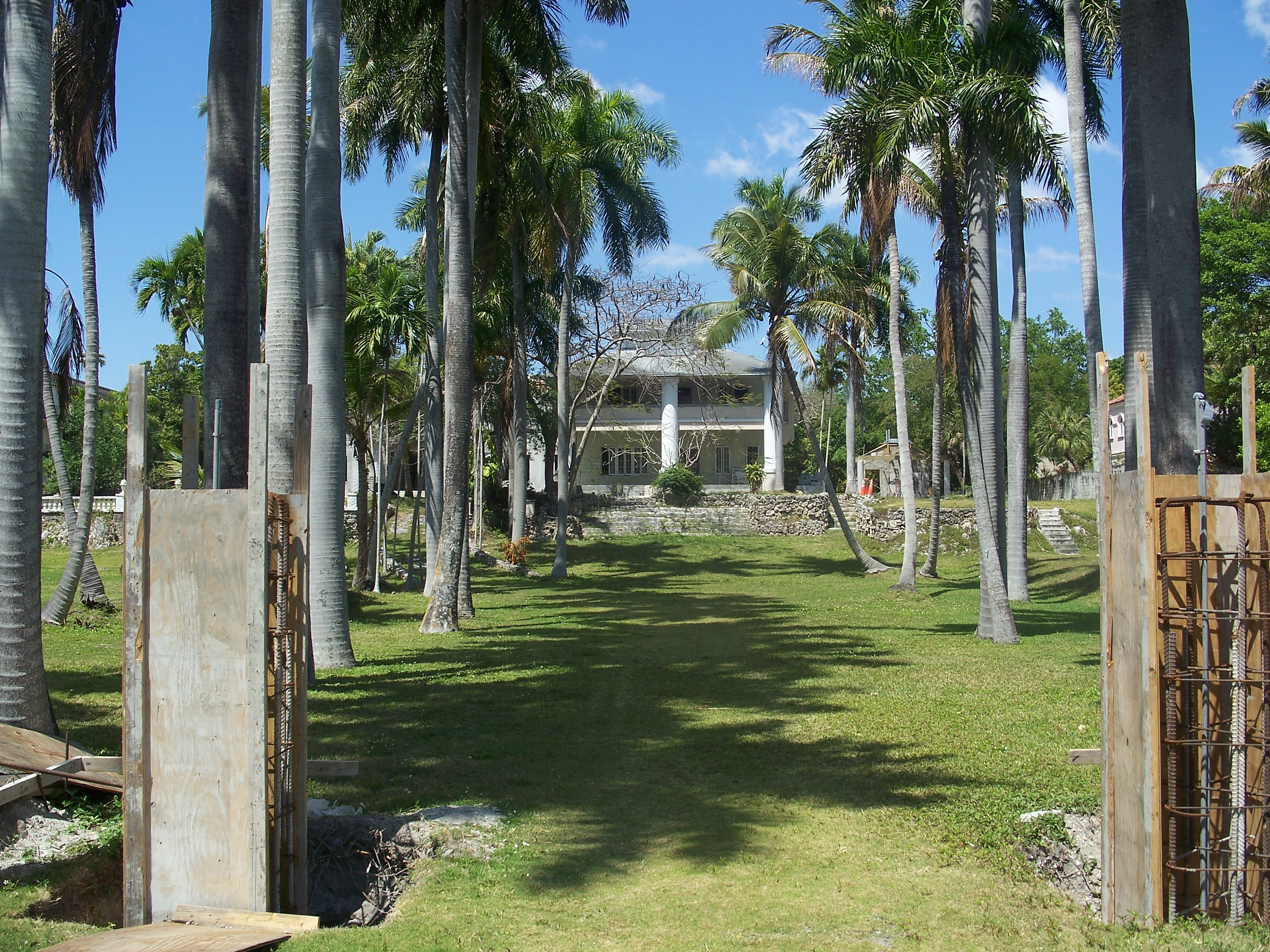
Trapp Homestead, 1887

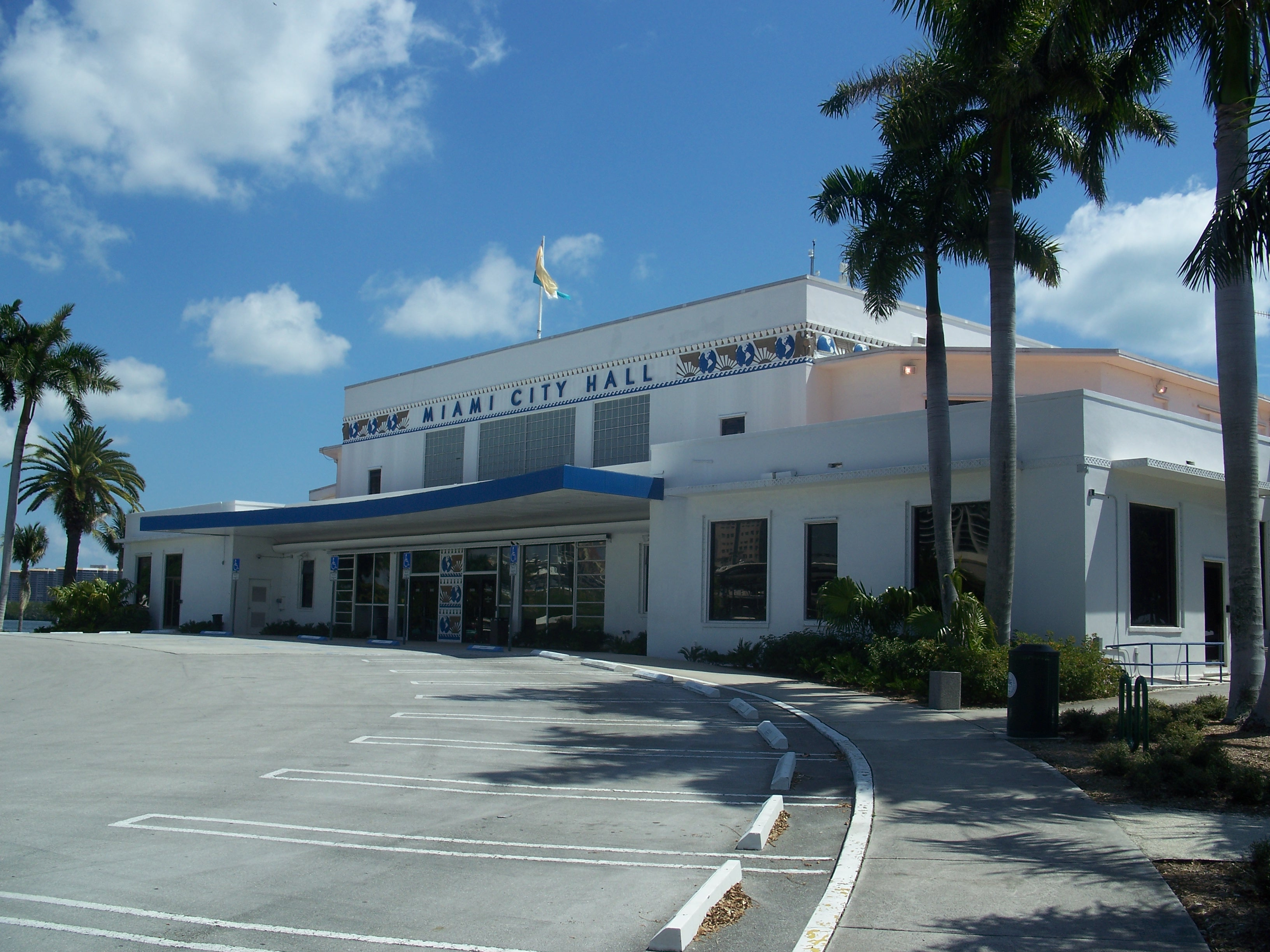
Dinner Key, 1917

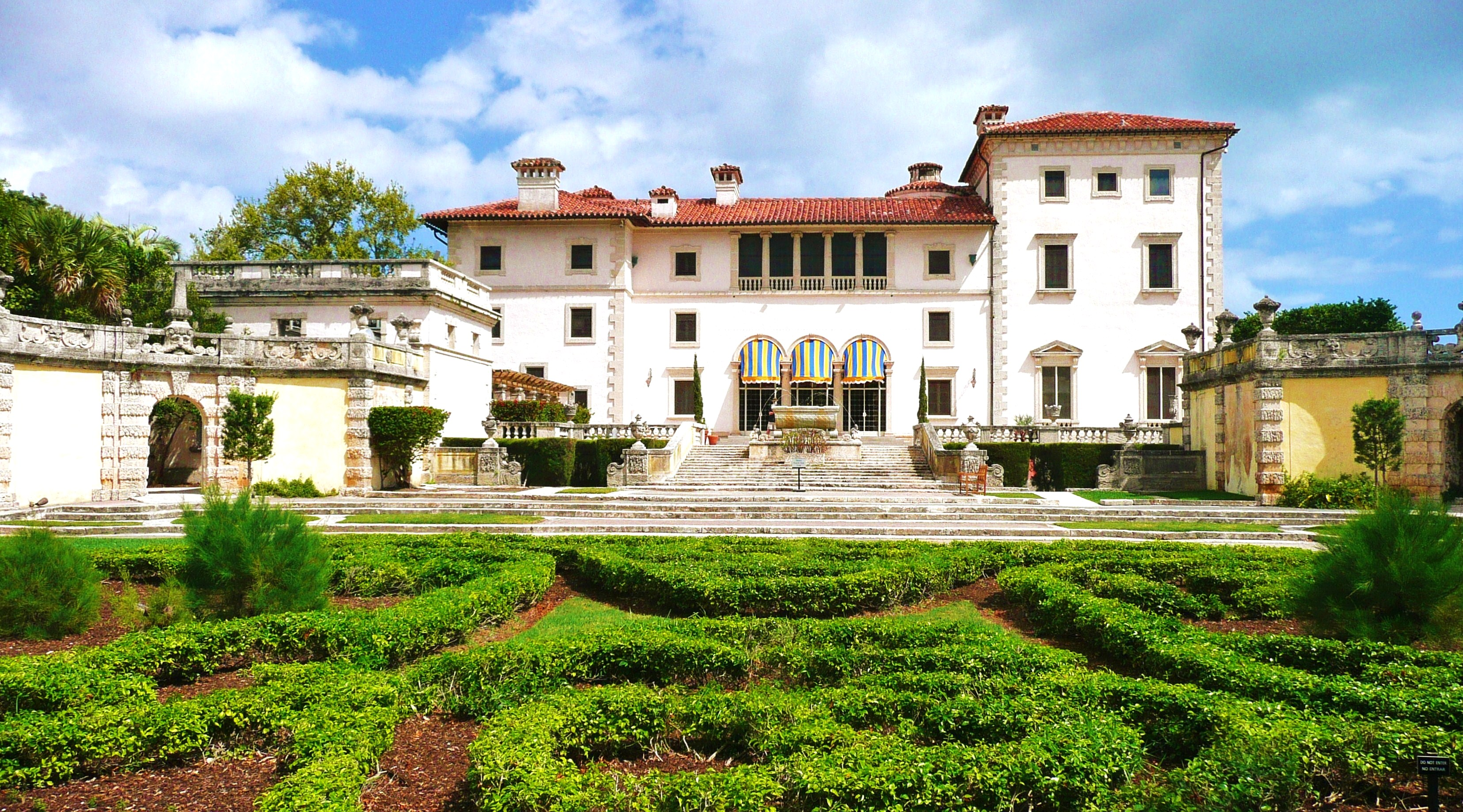
Villa Vizcaya, 1914–23

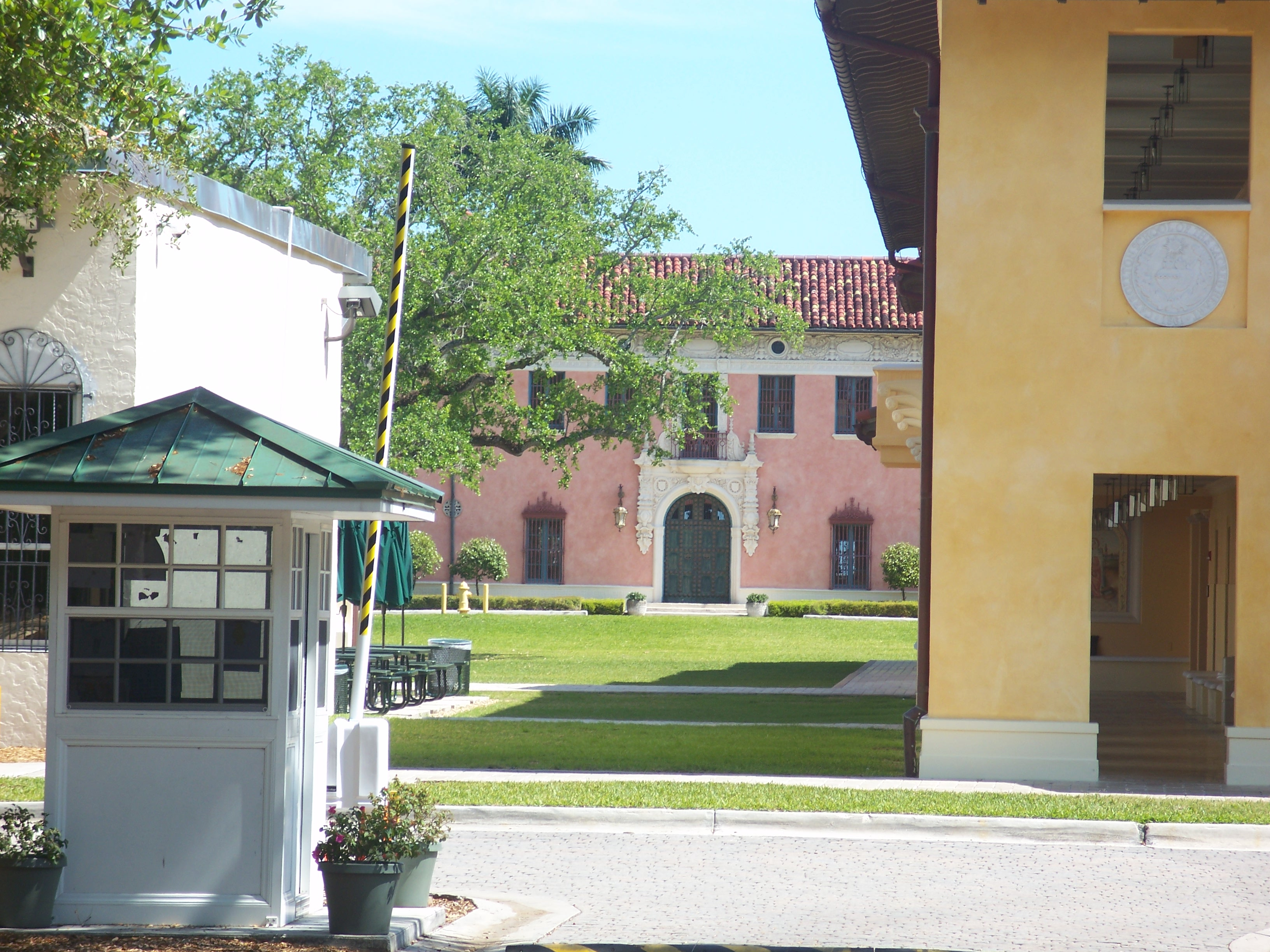
El Jardin at Carrollton School of the Sacred Heart, 1918

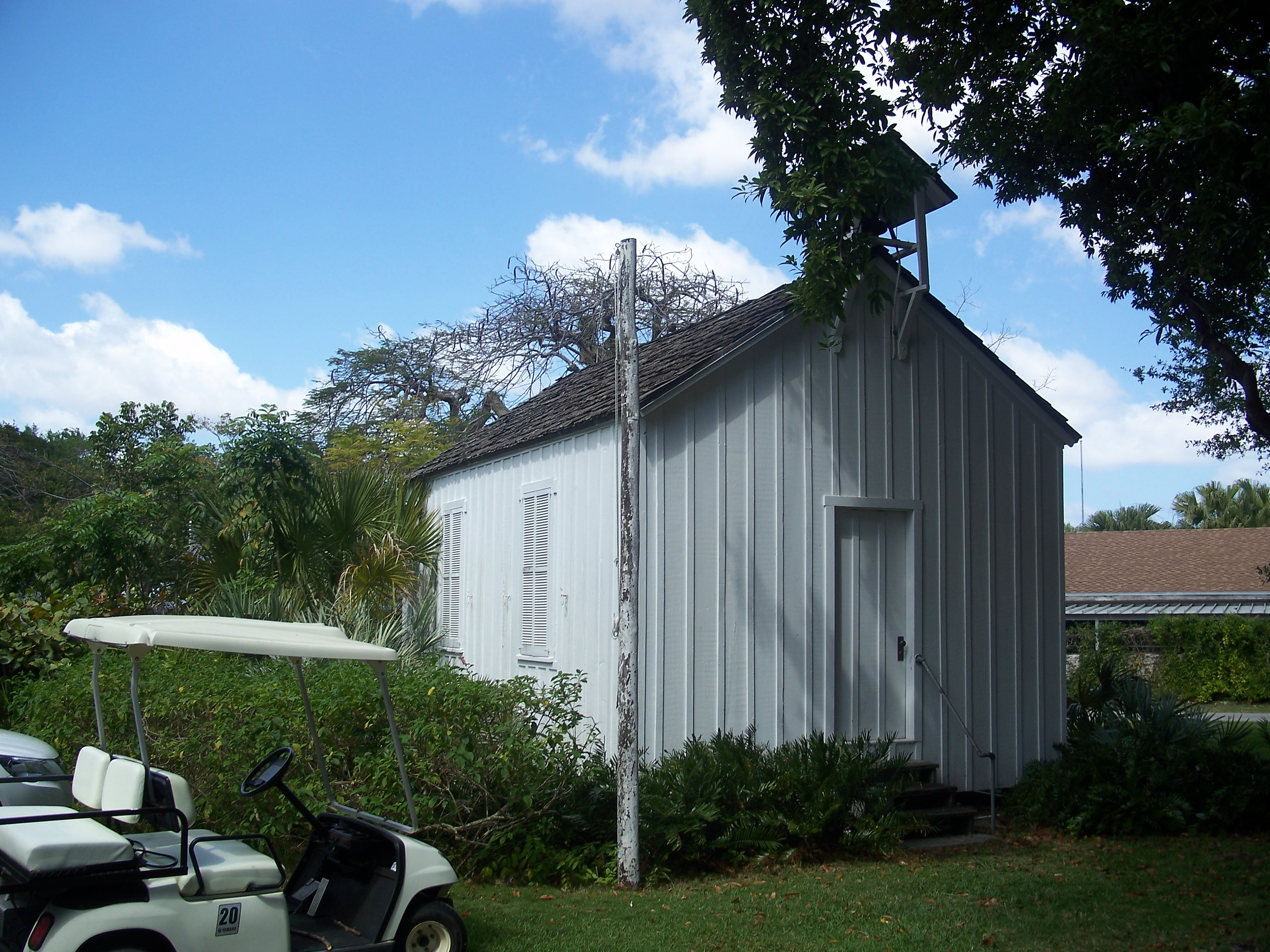
First Coconut Grove School, the first public school in Miami-Dade County, 1887

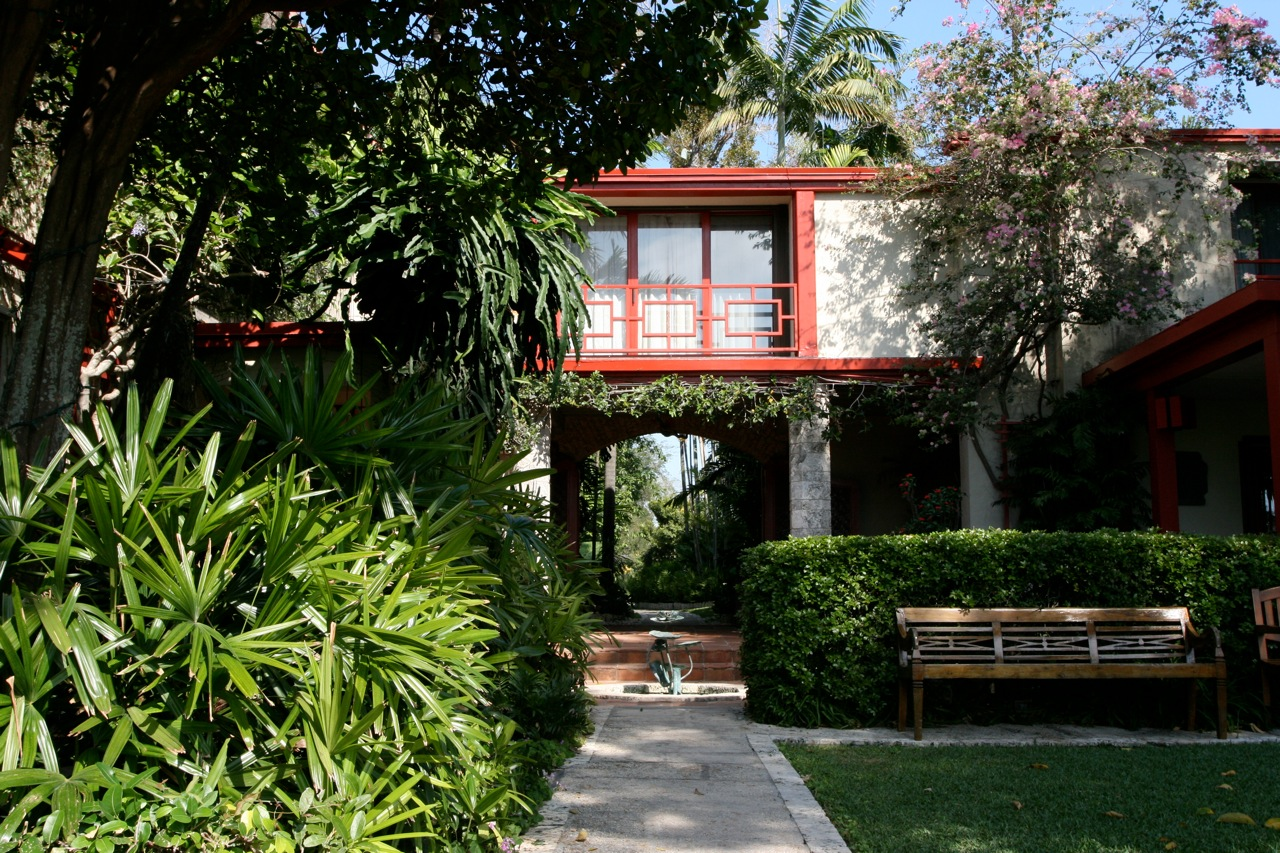
Sweeney House at The Kampong, 1916

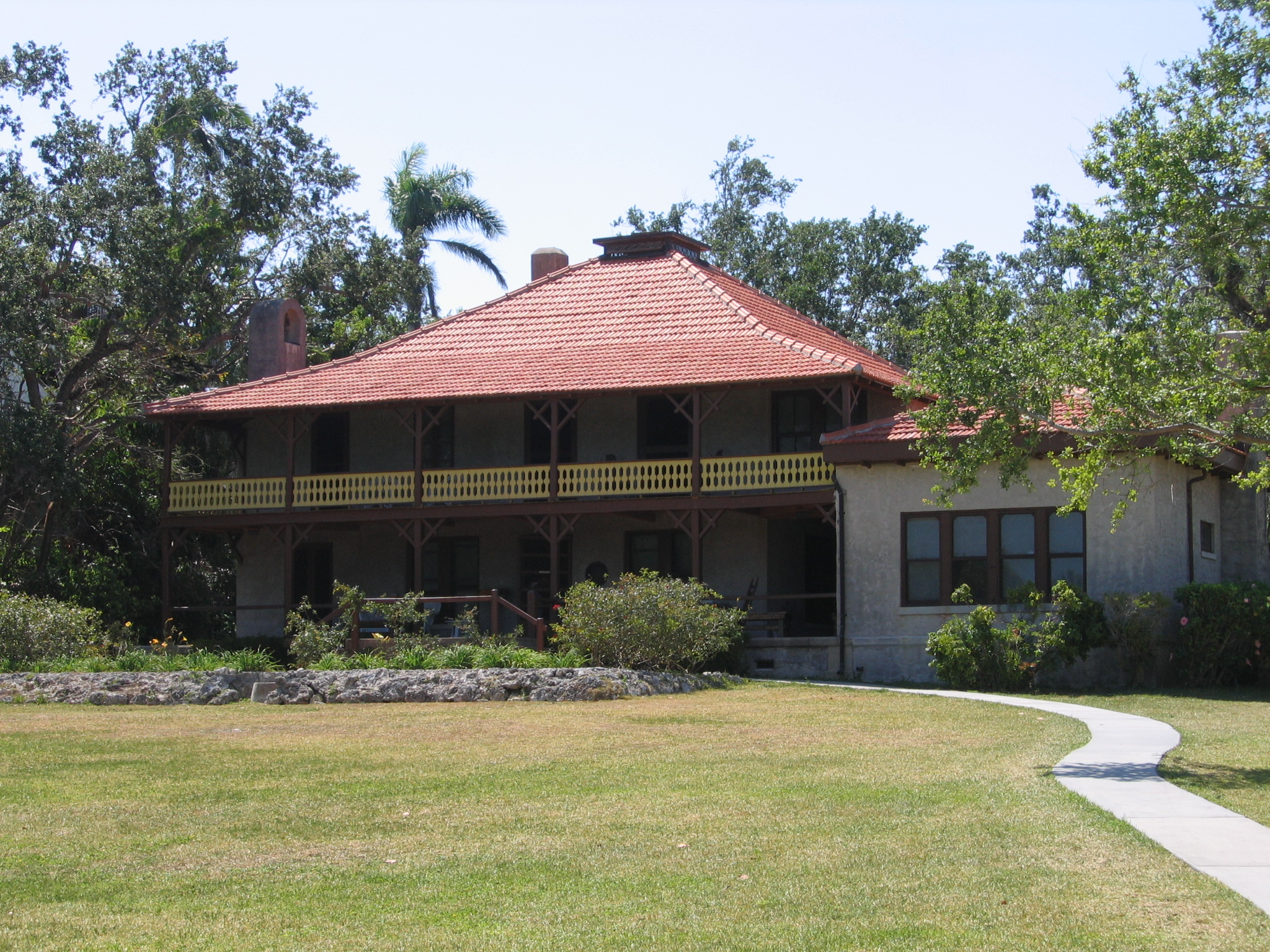
The Barnacle at The Barnacle Historic State Park, 1891

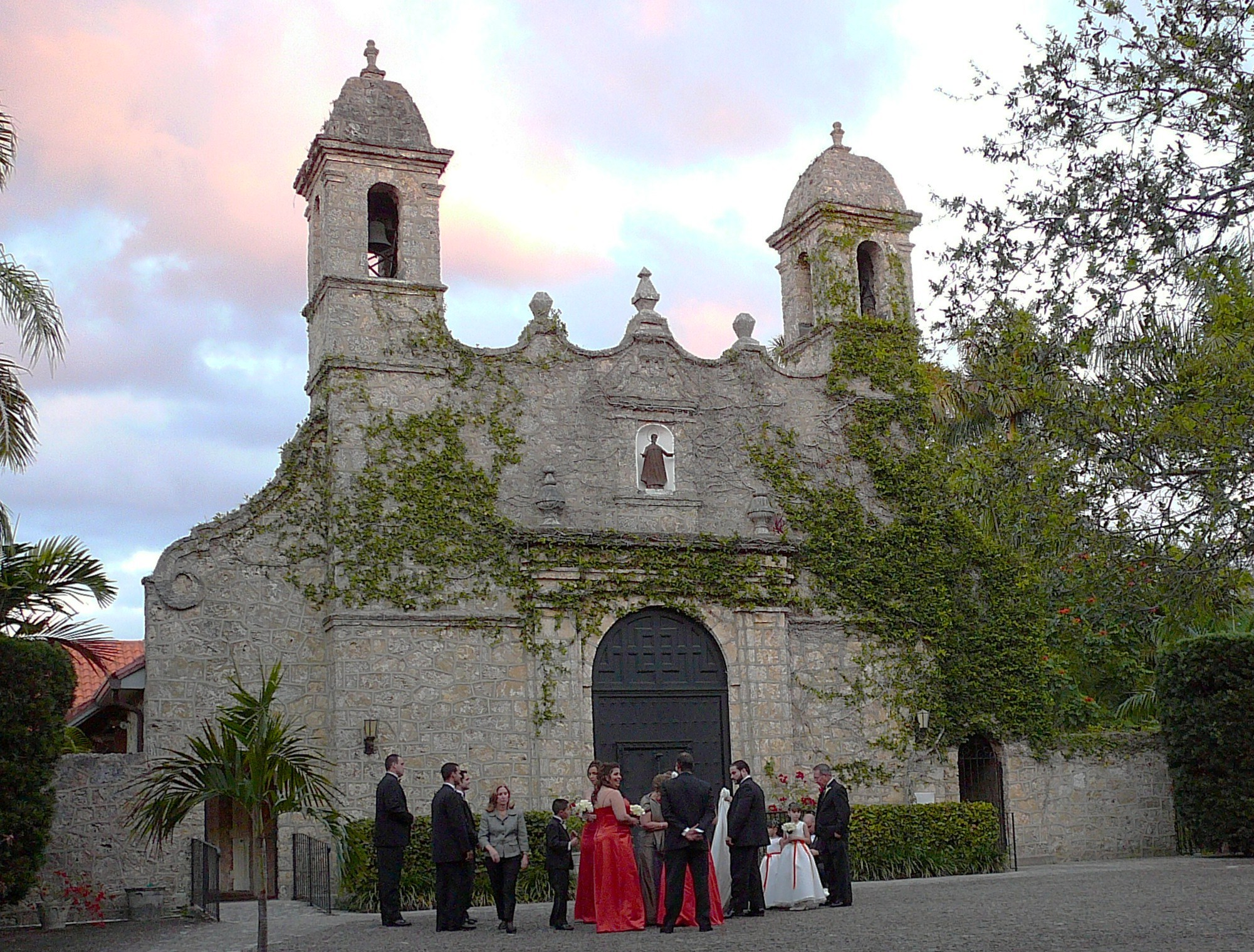
Plymouth Congregational Church, 1917

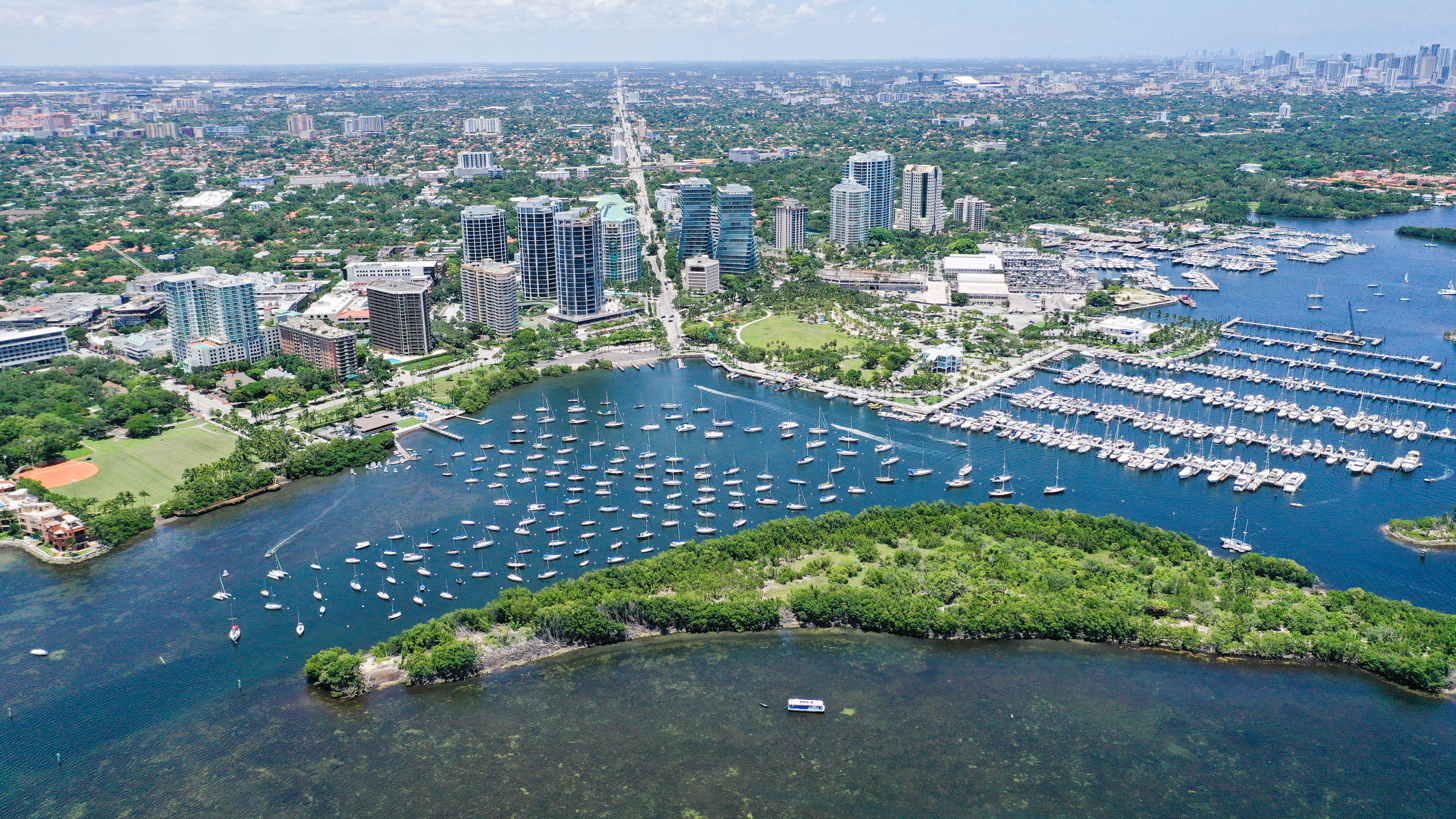
Downtown Coconut Grove in 2019
