= Trapp Homestead =

Historic house in Florida, United States

- U.S. National Register of Historic Places
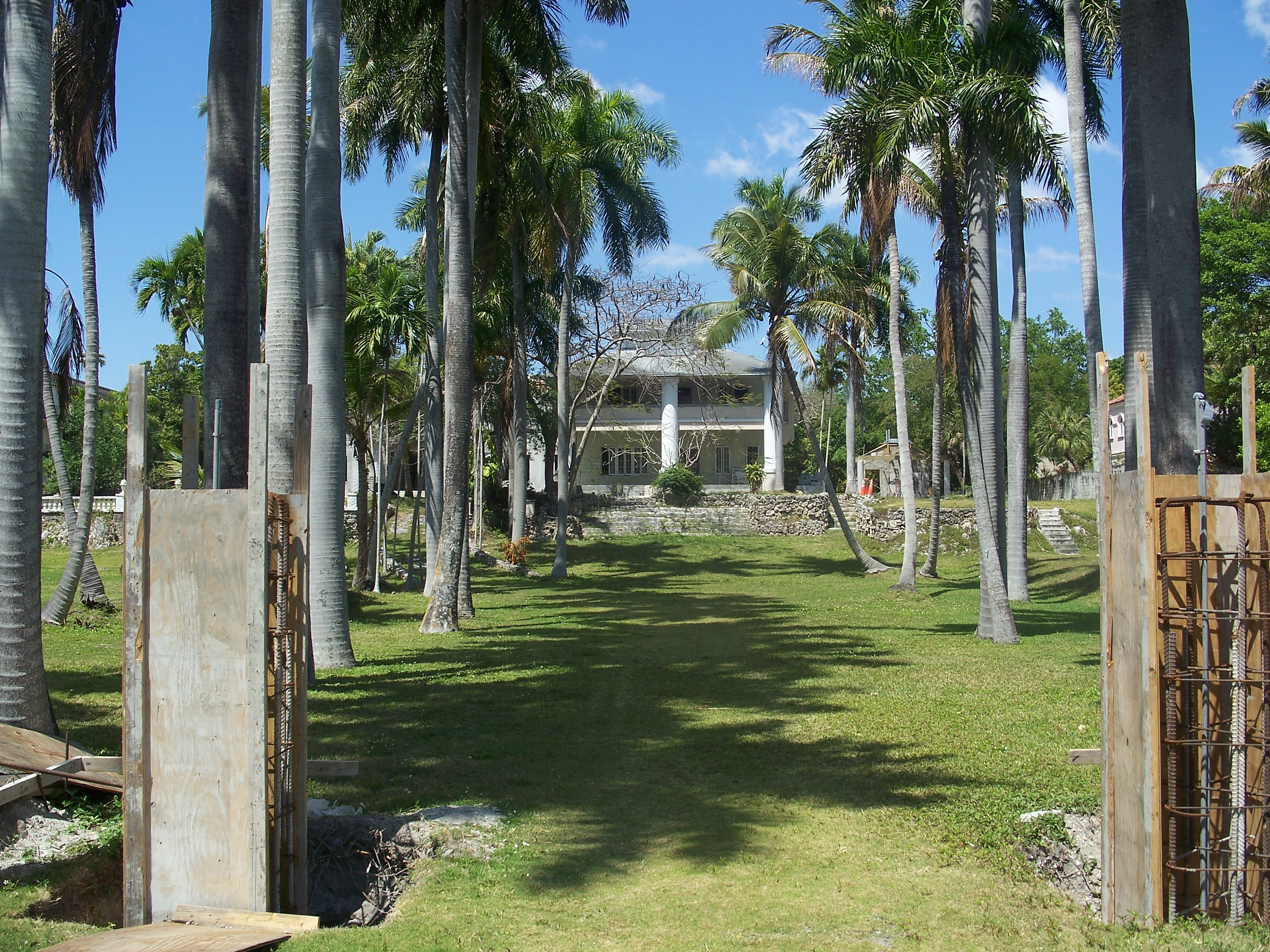

- Location within Miami Location within Florida Location within the United States
- Location: Miami, Miami-Dade County, Florida
- Coordinates: 25°44′2.0286″N 80°13′58.2492″W
- NRHP reference No.: 94001279
- Added to NRHP: November 10, 1994

The Trapp Homestead (also known as the Caleb Trapp House and the Trapp Estate) is a historic home in the Coconut Grove section of the City of Miami, Florida, United States. It is located at 2521 South Bayshore Drive. On November 10, 1994, it was added to the U.S. National Register of Historic Places. The home was constructed in 1887 out of oolitic lime quarried locally by Caleb Trapp (aged 70, at the time) and his son, Harlan. During construction, the Trapps lived on a thatched hut at the front of the property. The property is believed to be the oldest-standing masonry home in Miami-Dade County, Florida. The estate's construction pre-dates the incorporation of the City of Miami. The estate was particularly notable at the time because it was one of the few stone structures in Miami-Dade County (then called Dade County), as nearly all structures in the area were built of wood at that time.

== History ==
Originally, the property consisted of approximately 2.5 acres (10,000 m^{2}) overlooking Biscayne Bay before what is now called South Bayshore Drive was built. When the road was first built, it was known as Rhodes Boulevard and was named for Mrs. Trapp's family, which had previously settled in the area and received a 400-acre (1.6 km^{2}) land grant. Subsequently, Main Street, which was later renamed Tigertail Avenue was constructed along the property's northern boundary.

The Trapp family pioneered the famed "Trapp Avocado" and sold them by boat to early Miami area hotels. They also grew and milled coontie starch sold for local use. A road in Coconut Grove located just a few blocks away is named Trapp Avenue in honor of the Trapp family. The Trapps were significant community leaders in the area and Mr. Trapp was one of the fourteen founding members of the Biscayne Bay Yacht Club. Mrs. Trapp is believed to have given the first teachers' test for the local public school at the estate. She was also one of the first Public School Teachers in the area. In 1887 or 1888 a school taught by Harlan Trapp was opened in Lemon City, now a part of Miami.

In the years that followed, numerous mansions were constructed along Rhodes Boulevard/South Bayshore Drive and the street became notable in Miami for its expensive and substantial homes located on top of the Silver Bluff overlooking Biscayne Bay. The Trapp family later sold off various parts of the property where numerous homes and apartments were constructed.

In 1951, the Connelly family of Atlanta, Georgia purchased the property and used it as a part-time residence. It started to collapse in 1978. In the 1980s and 1990s, many of the other homes located on the sold off neighboring lots were demolished and all that remained were the four decaying structures on the central portion of the property, with the main building holding up best, though poorly.

Between 1994 and 1996, the Connellys purchased the remaining parcels on each side of the central parcel and had the site officially entered into the National Register of Historic Places. Meanwhile, the property continued to decline and several buildings became uninhabitable. The estate became well known with community activists who feared that the buildings would collapse and that a developer would purchase the property for highrise development.

In 2005, the already-weakened roof of the main house suffered serious damage in Hurricane Katrina and Hurricane Wilma, while other buildings on the site suffered more serious damage and it was determined that the secondary buildings could not be saved from demolition.

=== Preservation ===
In early 2006, the Connellys sold the property to Lisa and Victor Mendelson, longtime Miami and Coconut Grove residents, who worked with a historic preservationist architect, Richard Heisenbottle, FAIA to develop a plan to restore the main house and add an appropriate addition to it for their family's private use. Minor zoning variances were needed to accommodate the height of the crow's nest. The plans were approved by the City of Miami's Historic and Environmental Preservation Board in the Fall of 2006. Construction commenced in April 2010 and is expected to be complete in 12 months.
