= First Coconut Grove Schoolhouse =

- First Coconut Grove School
- U.S. National Register of Historic Places
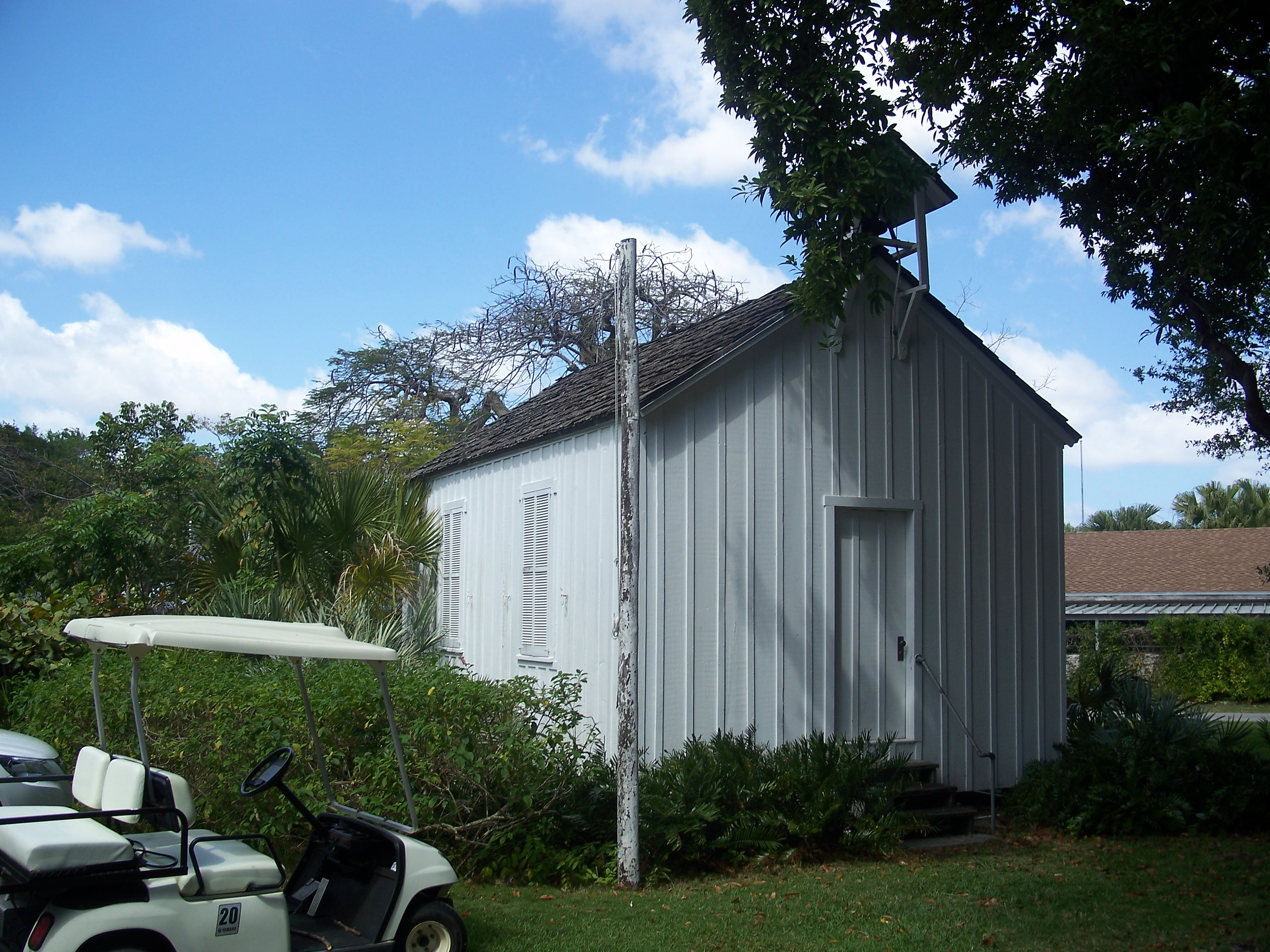
- Coconut Grove Schoolhouse, March 2011

- Location within Miami Location within Florida Location within the United States
- Location: Miami, Florida
- Coordinates: 25°43′25″N 80°14′52″W
- Architectural style: Bungalow/Craftsman
- NRHP reference No.: 75000547
- Added to NRHP: January 21, 1975

The First Coconut Grove Schoolhouse is a historic school located in Coconut Grove, Florida. The school originally resided at 2916 Grand Avenue in Miami. The structure was built in 1887 by Coconut Grove pioneer Charles Peacock. Peacock reportedly constructed the house using wood gathered from ships wrecked in nearby Key Biscayne. The building originally served as a community gathering place, with Sunday School as its main purpose.

In 1889, the one-room schoolhouse became the very first public school for area children. The building's owner, Charles Peacock, was paid rent in the amount of $12.00 for the first seven-month school year. Ten children from the Frow, Pent, and Peacock pioneer families, were its first attendees.

The first meetings of the Miami-Dade County School Board can be traced back to this period, with the First Coconut Grove Schoolhouse located in School District Number Three. The first teacher hired by the Miami-Dade County School Board to instruct pioneer children of Coconut Grove, Flora McFarlane, was contracted in November 1889.

The schoolhouse also retains historical significance since the first meetings of the Woman's Club of Coconut Grove were held on site. In February 1891, Flora McFarlane and Coconut Grove pioneers Isabella Peacock, Euphemia Frow, Mary Munroe, and Louisa Newbold held began their work of organizing numerous social, civic, and educational projects.

In 1902, Charles Peacock sold the First Coconut Grove Schoolhouse for $400.00. The property remained in possession of the new owner until it was sold again in 1944. The building was then purchased by Ryder Systems, refurbished, and relocated to the Plymouth Congregational Church property in 1970. The schoolhouse remains on church property at 3429 Devon Road, Miami, Florida, 33133.

On January 21, 1975, it was added to the U.S. National Register of Historic Places.
