= Bridgeprep Academy of Arts and Minds =

Coordinates: 25.7271°N 80.2445°W

Bridgeprep Academy of Arts & Minds Charter High School
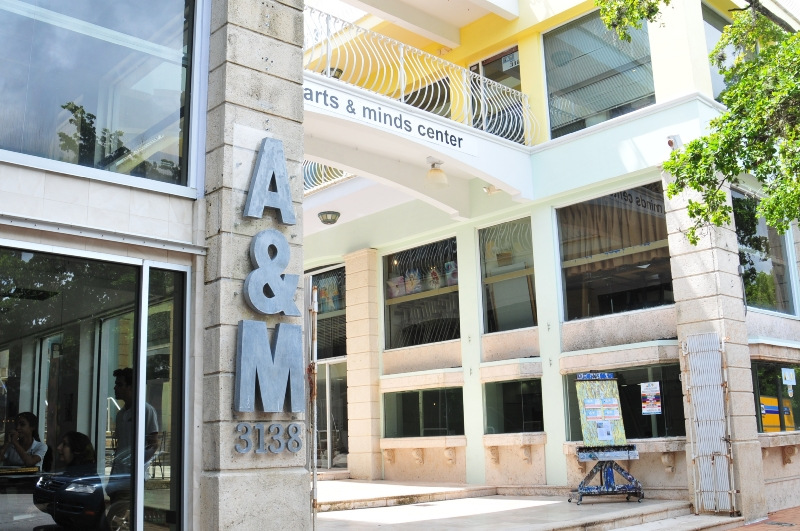
- BAAM Campus

Location
- 3138 Commodore Plz; Coconut Grove, Miami, Florida 33133; United States

Information
- Type: Public Charter
- Motto: Home of the Stars
- Established: 2003
- Closed: 2018
- School district: Miami-Dade County Public Schools
- Superintendent: Alberto M. Carvalho
- Principal: Antonietta Michelle Digirolamo
- Grades: 9 to 12
- Enrollment: 385 (2015-16)
- Campus type: Urban
- Colors: Blue & Yellow
- Mascot: Star
- Website: Bridgeprep Academy of Arts & Minds Official Website

Bridgeprep Academy of Arts and Minds Charter High School (BAAM) (formerly the Academy of Arts and Minds) was a performing and visual arts public secondary charter school in Coconut Grove, in Miami-Dade, Florida. The last known principal was Antonietta Michelle Digirolamo.

== History ==
The Academy of Arts and Minds was the first performing-arts charter school in the Miami-Dade County school district. It was founded in 2003 by Manuel Alonso-Poch, a real-estate lawyer, and is housed in a former shopping mall. By 2011, enrollment had expanded to 450 students, but gaps in staffing and resources were noted, and the school board investigated claims of conflict of interest on the governing board.

In 2010 and 2011 the State of Florida gave the school an "A" grade, but this declined to a "C" in 2013. The school contracted with S.M.A.R.T. Management, an education management company, hired Antonietta DiGirolamo as principal, and upgraded their educational technology. In 2014 US News & World Report ranked BAAM 32nd in Florida.

== Closure and Campus Vandalism ==
After 2014, the school declined in quality. Many students and parents complained about the lack of textbooks, lack of teachers, bullying that went unaccounted for, terrible lunches, and nonexistent clubs that the school originally advertised.

During the 2016–2017 school year, students achieved a 40-44% proficiency rating in Reading and Language Arts. This is lower than Florida's state average of 54%. Students also achieved a math proficiency of 28%, significantly lower than Florida's state average of 57%.

The school was shut down in 2018 after years of controversy. Now empty, the building has experienced heavy vandalism with no current plans on what to do with the vacant building.

== Negative Criticism of BAAM ==
According to Yelp, Academy of the Arts & Minds Charter High School has a rating of 2 1/2 stars. The negative reviews of the school dating back to 2016. Many parents reported the school would harass households with phone calls to convince students to enroll at Academy of the Arts and Minds. Some students reported that a few teachers were racist and let students use the "N word" against African-American students. These teachers (their identity is unknown) claimed the students were "overreacting" and told them to "not be so sensitive".

Additional reviews from parents cited that they felt their children weren't getting the quality education the school advertised heavily. School lunches were virtually inedible and "served halfway frozen. A parent was sent pictures of the lunch and quoted how it resembled "jail food". Many parents also described how the school itself, along with its bathrooms, were rundown and dirty.
