= CocoWalk =

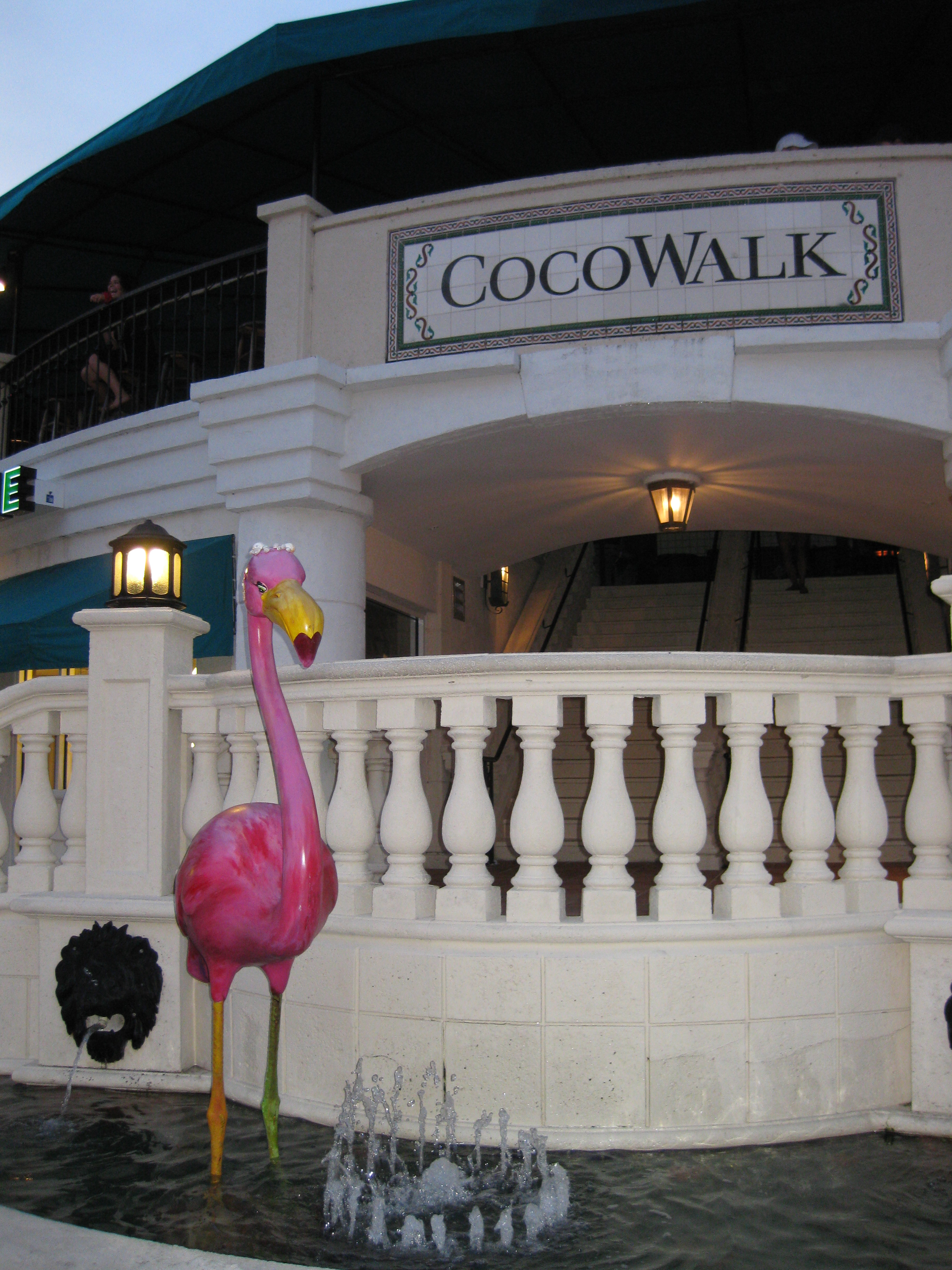
- The entrance (old CocoWalk)
- Location: Coconut Grove, Miami, Florida, United States
- Coordinates: 25.72874°N 80.24209°W
- Address: 3015 Grand Avenue
- Opened: November 1990
- Website: www.cocowalk.com

CocoWalk is an open-air shopping mall in the Coconut Grove neighborhood of Miami, Florida, in the United States.

The development and planning of CocoWalk goes as far back as 1984 in the city of Miami. It was developed by Constructa Properties and designed by John Clark of Maryland. It opened in 1990. It featured an iconic entrance with an open plaza being the central point of the mall. The design heavily reflected Spanish architecture.

It marked the transformation of Coconut Grove from a sleepy Bohemian neighborhood following the era of the Cocaine Cowboys. This disgruntled many locals a few years later, having to deal with an increasingly suburban lifestyle with a tourist presence, along with worsening traffic conditions.

Being a popular local shopping destination and tourist attraction, dining and entertainment destination throughout the 90s, the center, however, began to decline in the early 2000s as Miami Beach increased in regional popularity for dining and entertainment and many of the retail chains, combined with its relatively small format, lessened the appeal for shoppers.

In 2004, Thor Equities purchased the mall for $120 million in an attempt to tap into Hispanic and Black customers. By this time, it hosted chain stores like Banana Republic, B. Dalton, and Gap, along eight bars and restaurants.

In 2006, PMAT Real Estate Investments purchased the Cocowalk mall for $87 million.

In 2007, it experienced what was described as a renaissance, with a revival in activity within the mall and new tenants, including high-end stores, signing leases for space within the mall. Renovation to the movie theater was made by new tenants Muvico Theaters. Having bought it for $87 million, PMAT invested $7 million in improvements.

It was sold for $87.5 million to the Maryland-based Federal Realty Investment Trust in 2015, its fifth owner since its opening. In 2017, plans to redesign CocoWalk were announced, with the intent to get rid of the Spanish-style architecture. The new design would better cater to the local, suburban population as opposed to the previous focus on tourists, with owner FRIT citing localization within Miami's communities. The Cinepolis movie theater underwent renovations. There was a focus on leasing existing vacant space as office space and moving the retail wing to one side of the mall. Its vacancy rate was 20% as of May 2017.

After a total revamp CocoWalk reopened in 2021.
