= Charles Avenue =

Historic street in Miami, Florida, US

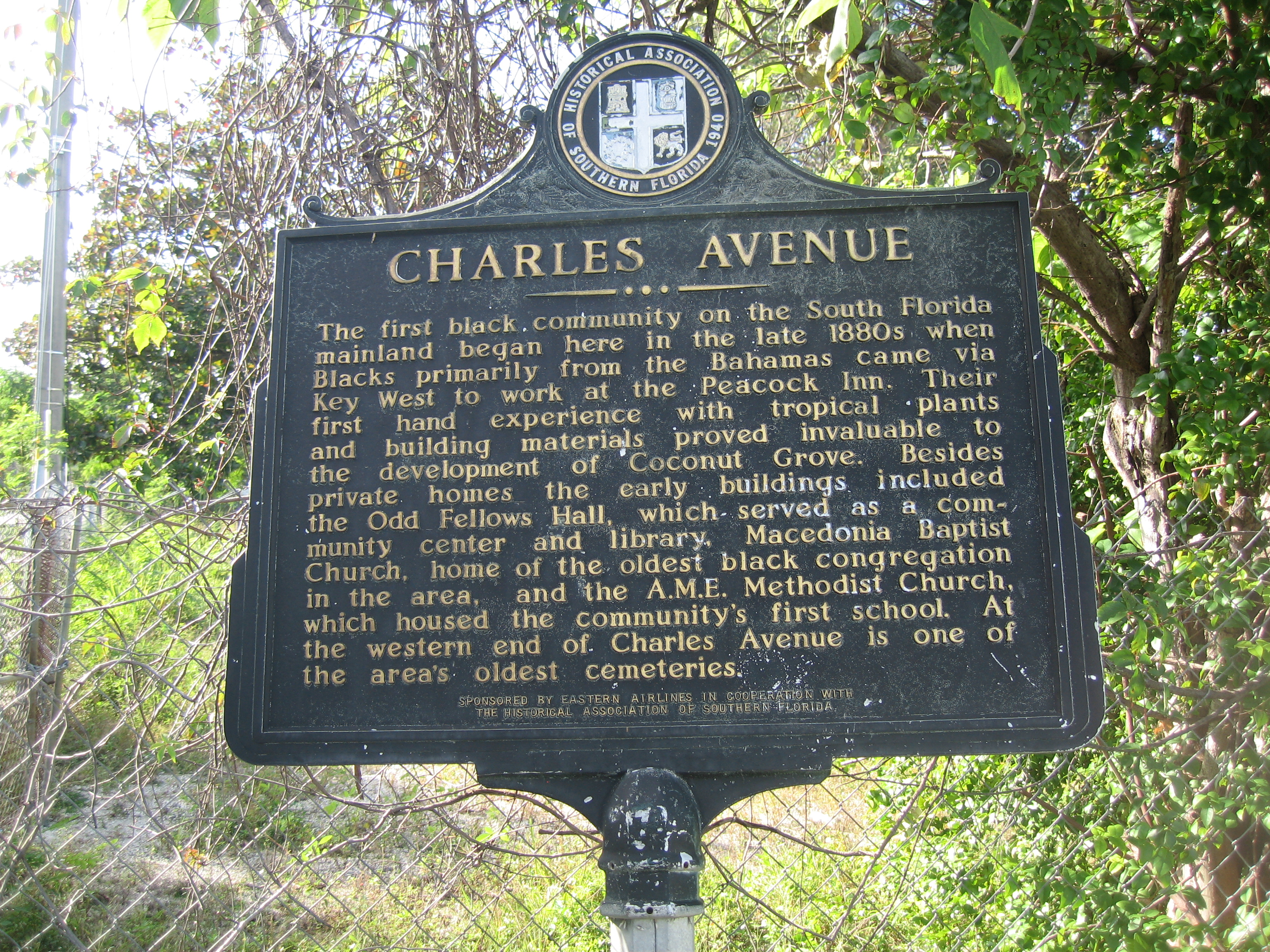
Charles Avenue, Sign

Charles Avenue is a historic street in Coconut Grove. It is one of the oldest streets in South Florida. It was built in the 1880s by Bahamian settlers who worked for the first hotels in the area. Charles Avenue is lined with shotgun houses, churches, a cemetery and the Coconut Grove Playhouse.
