= King Mango Strut =

Annual satirical parade in Coconut Grove, Florida, USA

Coordinates: 25.7276°N 80.2437°W

The King Mango Strut is an annual satirical parade held in Coconut Grove, Florida. Founded by Glenn Terry and Bill Dobson in 1982, it is held on the last Sunday of each year. The parade, which uses the motto "Putting the 'nut' in Coconut Grove", is composed of floats mocking local and national stories from the previous year.

== History ==
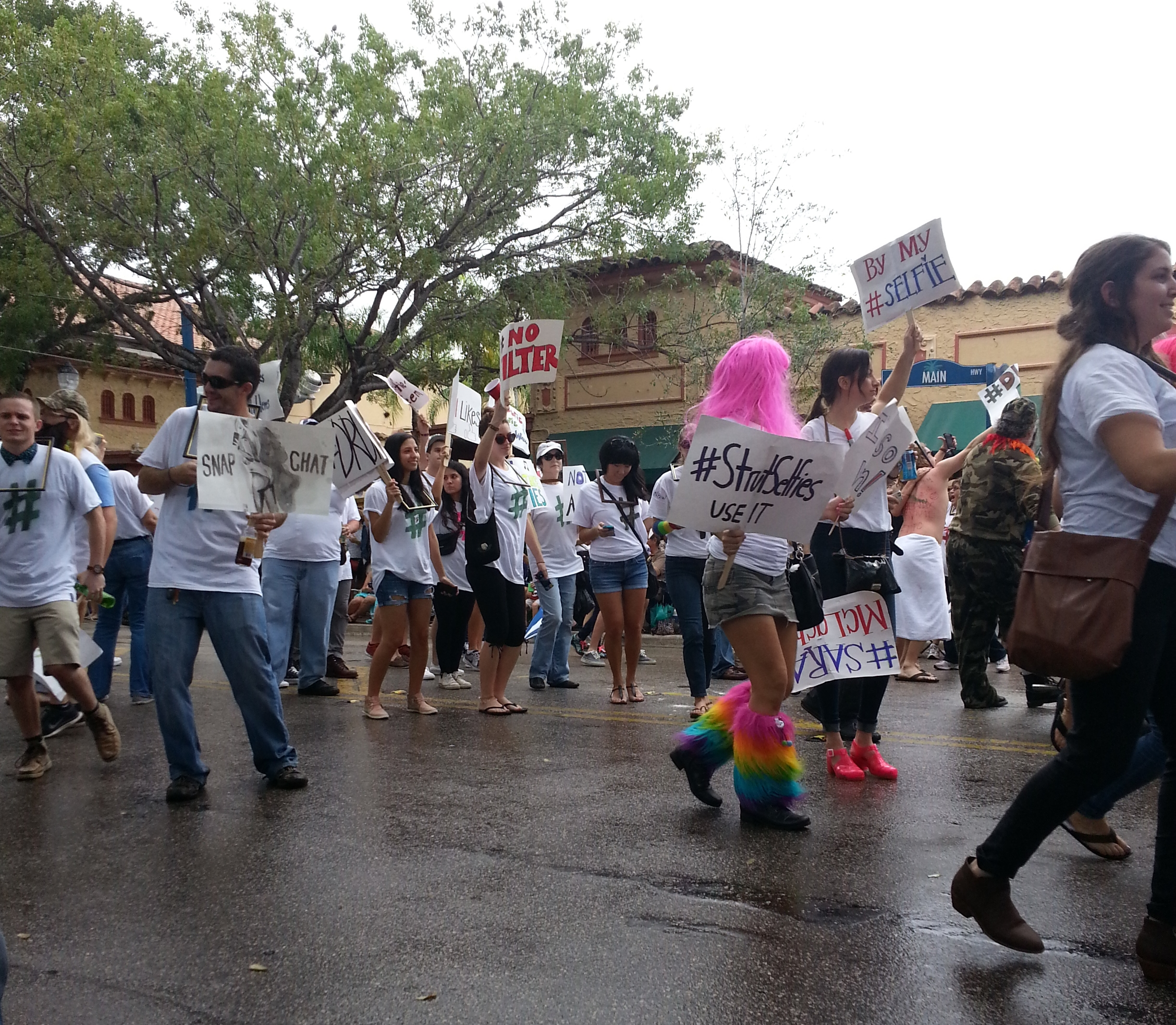
A group calling themselves the "Narcissistic Selfie Association (NSA)", one of the floats in the 2013 parade. Members of the float frequently ran into audience to take selfies with them.

The King Mango Strut was started in 1982 by Glenn Terry and Bill Dobson as a parody of the annual King Orange Jamboree Parade for the Orange Bowl. After Terry and Dobson's group, the Mango Marching Band, was denied entry into the King Orange Jamboree Parade due to their use of kazoos, conch shells, and garbage can drums as instruments, the pair held their own parade, initially by simply marking the ends of a street with signs.

In 2009 Glenn Terry and group treasurer Antoinette Baldwin got into a public dispute over the creative direction of the Strut, which culminated in the city choosing Baldwin to run the event, and Terry refusing to march in the parade in protest. The parade is now run by King Mango Productions, a non-profit organization headed by Mike Lucas.

The Strut was on hiatus due to the Covid-19 pandemic and is resuming for 2022 on January 8, 2023.

== Overview ==
The parade lampoons both local and national figures and issues. In 1986, the parade included a group of people dressed as members of the sex and drug trades, calling themselves the "Biscayne Boulevard Chamber of Commerce". In 1996 several floats poked fun at the City of Miami's debt crisis, including a mock auction of city buildings. In 1997 and 2000, floats mocked the area's history of voting irregularities, with the latter year focusing on the issues the state faced during the 2000 presidential election.

There is no stringent entry process for participants. Simply showing up to a meeting and announcing a desire to participate is enough. In one case, a group showed up on the day of the event, with no prior notice, and was allowed to march with the parade. The Miami chapter of the Sierra Club has participated since 1988, and a local Hare Krishna group is also a long time participant.
