= Sepy Dobronyi =

American actor

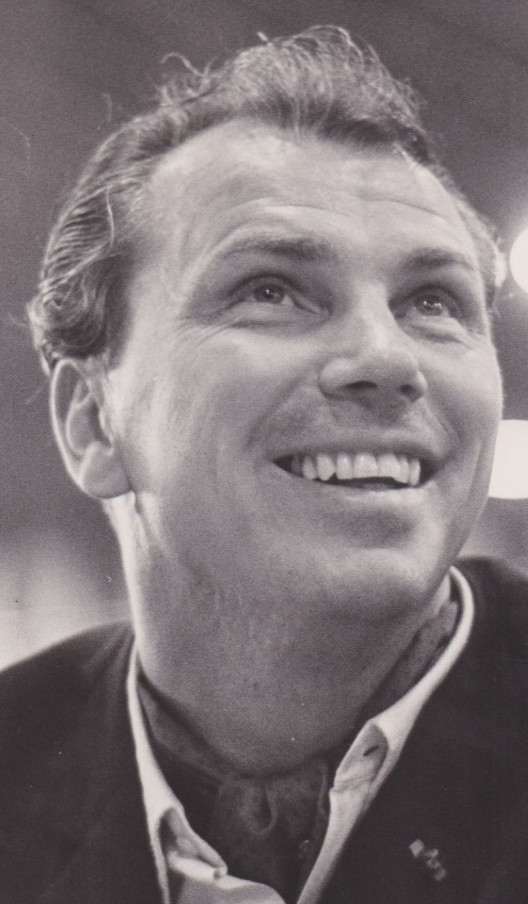
Dobronyi in 1961

Baron Joseph "Sepy" De Bicske Dobronyi (April 20, 1922 – May 29, 2010) was a Hungarian-born American sculptor.

Dobronyi was known for his bronze and gold sculptures of celebrities, such as a 42-inch-tall golden statue of movie star Anita Ekberg. "The Ekberg Bronze" was featured in the August 1956 issue of Playboy magazine by Hugh Hefner, a friend of Dobronyi.

== Early life ==
Joseph De Bicske Dobronyi was born to József Dobronyi and Szidónia Petric, in the town of Bicske, Hungary, on April 20, 1922. He was raised by his mother.

=== World War II ===
In 1940, Dobronyi was drafted into the Hungarian Air Force during World War II, serving as a pilot. He specialized in transporting the wounded to hospitals from the front lines for the Red Cross. Dobronyi was one of six pilots chosen to try out the world's first rocket-powered aircraft. In 1945, he was captured by the Red Army after his airplane was shot down over Hungary. Dobronyi was held in prison in occupied Hungary but managed to escape in one day and immediately returned to Budapest.

=== Europe to Cuba ===
Hiding out for a few months, he managed to earn a living by working odd jobs. He obtained a job as an interpreter for the American Military Mission, also known as the Diplomatic mission, where his talent for speaking six languages was useful. He spoke Hungarian, French, English, German, Swedish and Spanish. By 1946, Dobronyi had been refused a passport, so he decided to leave the country and headed to Sweden to visit some friends of the family who were living there. It took him six months to walk from Budapest to Sweden. Since he did not have a visa or papers, it was a challenge to travel through German-occupied territory, including Denmark.

Six months later, he reached Stockholm and started an apprenticeship at the House of Thomason, crown jewelers for the Swedish royal family, where he studied wood, metalworking, ceramics, and sketching. By 1947, he had been selected to execute the design of the brooch that Folke Bernadotte gave to Princess Elizabeth on the occasion of her engagement to Prince Philip.

At this time, an offer was made by King Gustaf V of Sweden to Dobronyi to travel to Caracas, Venezuela, which he accepted. Since the Caracas contract was never signed, Dobronyi searched for a job and was able to find work in a jeweler's shop. This job enabled him not only to survive but also to start saving in order to purchase his own tools. Gradually, he began designing his own ideas and working on them in his apartment after hours. His dedication and love for the arts proved fruitful as he started to build up a clientele, and within a year he was able to fund his own studio. He incorporated his European style, and with his elegant and original approach to his designs, and the attraction from the Cuban society proved successful. Each work was signed with his trademark signature, "Sepy." His clientele included American tourists and people in the entertainment industry as well as the local Cuban society. In just a few years, his studio was being visited by celebrities such as Ernest Hemingway, Errol Flynn, and Nat King Cole. A necklace of shells in a net design was made for Mary Welsh Hemingway, who personally requested it. This brought more American customers to Dobronyi as well as publicity for his studio with the magazines and newspapers in the U.S.

During this time, Dobronyi's studio was doing very well, and the reputation he had with society was positive, so he was able to dedicate some time to his first childhood fascination, African sculpture. He had always found time for his carvings throughout the years, and in the 1970s he made five expeditions to New Guinea in search of Asmat art. While he resided in Cuba, he came across old African Native Art. Dobronyi was welcomed into the secret ritual dances and festivals of the Namigos, who were an Afro-Cuban group of natives.

=== Cuba to America ===
Dobronyi came to the United States in 1959. On December 20, 1963, 40-year-old Dobronyi, who had citizenship in Hungary, Sweden and Cuba, was sworn in a federal courtroom, as a United States citizen by Judge Emett C. Choate. The Federal Building held a pre-holiday session and this was a very special day for him as it had been a goal of his ever since the days of World War II.

== Family and personal life ==
=== Romantic relationships ===
Dobronyi claimed romantic involvements with celebrities and personalities, including Anita Ekberg, whom Sepy met at a Los Angeles art gallery exhibit of primitives, when she was herself unknown; Ava Gardner; Brigitte Bardot; and Linda Christian

=== Marriages ===
- Alicia Hartman y Portela (1913–2009) (June 5, 1953 – May 17, 1960) (divorced). Daughter of Walter Hartman, owner of the first Chrysler car dealership in Cuba
- Amy Green Brown (August 11, 1922 – November 19, 1989) (1960-?) (divorced). New York City heiress, daughter of Norvin Hewitt Green and Irene Pierce of New York
- Inger Anette Nordquist (1945-) (1969–1972) (divorced)
- In 1969, Dobronyi married his third wife, Anette Nordquist, a statuesque Swedish blonde. Two years later, the Herald reported that at 8:12 a.m. on July 1, 1971, Dobronyi became the first person in Miami to file for a no-fault dissolution under a revised state divorce law effective at midnight.
- Playboy Bunny Rita Lino (1958-) (May 9, 1977 – 1983) (divorced)
- Eszter Paula Barany (1971-) (1999–2002) (divorced)

=== Children ===
- Joseph (April 26, 1961 ) (born Joseph Bicskei Dobronyi Jr.) – with Amy Green Brown Dobronyi
- Ferenc (September 22, 1962) (born Ferenc Norvin Dobronyi) – with Amy Green Brown Dobronyi

== Organizations ==
=== Cuban Art Center ===
Dobronyi was one of the best known men in Havana. Old tourist literature credits Dobronyi as the founder of the Cuban Art Center in 1951. It was a group effort to help artists in Havana and around the island reach a wider audience and sell more of their work. He had always been interested in Cuban culture and specialized in primitive, semi-abstract sculpture. A modern "Native Bazaar," which centralized the display of the art and sculpture of 187 Cuban artists, put shirts on artists' backs and bankbooks in their pockets for the first time in the island's history.

=== Bodeguita del Medio ===
Dobronyi was also the co-owner of the Bodeguita del medio which was the hangout for the jet-setters of that era. In 1951, Dobronyi convinced owner Angel Martinez to convert his store into a tavern. There, he became the focal point of both the art community and the social circles. Some of his close friends were celebrities such as Ernest and Mary Hemingway, Hugh Hefner, Nat King Cole John Wayne and Errol Flynn.

=== Royal Society for the Encouragement of Arts, Manufactures and Commerce ===
In 1985, Dobronyi was elected a Fellow of the Royal Society for the Encouragement of Arts, Manufactures and Commerce.

=== International Explorers Society ===
Dobronyi was co-founder and director of the International Explorers Society. This society was established for the purpose of promoting exploration and furthering the knowledge of geography, archaeology, anthropology and other related sciences through expeditions, field trips, and research projects. The Society actively supports programs for the protection of the environment, the conservation of wildlife, and the preservation of archaeological and historic sites.

== Discography ==
LP: Sepy Presents: La Bodeguita del Medio, The Music of Havana's Most Fabulous Cafe. Recorder by Riverside Records and Produced by Bill Grauer Productions, Inc, New York, 1957.

== Death ==
Dobronyi died of liver cancer on May 29, 2010, at Mount Sinai Medical Center in Miami Beach at age 88.

The item from his estate that got the most attention since Dobronyi's death was the old underwear of Queen Elizabeth II. The Miami Herald reports that the story of the Royal panties has circled the web and print magazines, after their sale was first reported by celebrity news website TMZ.com.

Hansons Auctioneers and Valuers, the same auction house that handled the sale of Queen Victoria's undergarments back in 2008, contacted the estate and expressed their interest in handling the sale.
