= Biscayne Bay Yacht Club =

Private yacht club in Miami, Florida

- Burgee
- Short name: BBYC
- Founded: 1887
- Location: 2540 South Bayshore Drive, Coconut Grove, FL 33133
- Website: www.biscaynebayyachtclub.com

The Biscayne Bay Yacht Club is a private yacht club located in Coconut Grove, Miami (United States). Founded in 1887 by Commodore Ralph Middleton Munroe, the Biscayne Bay Yacht Club is one of the oldest yacht clubs in Florida.

BBYC is one of the 5 members of the Biscayne Bay Yacht Racing Association (BBYRA), together with Coconut Grove Sailing Club, Coral Reef Yacht Club, Key Biscayne Yacht Club and Miami Yacht Club, and one of the six founding members of the Southern Ocean Racing Conference (SORC), being the St. Petersburg Yacht Club, Miami Yacht Club, Coral Reef Yacht Club, Lauderdale Yacht Club and Nassau Yacht Club the other five. Biscayne Bay Yacht Club has recently adopted the sport of windsurfing. Currently, BBYC is the location of one of the most successful youth windsurfing programs in the United States of America. With the rapid growth of the program, some local windsurfers are on their way to the Olympics. Biscayne Bay Yacht Club has already hosted several windsurfing regattas and is known internationally as a hub of the sport.

== History ==
From 1888 to 1893, the Cape Florida lighthouse was leased by the United States Secretary of the Treasury for a total of US$1.00 (20 cents per annum) to the Biscayne Bay Yacht Club for use as its headquarters. It was listed as the southernmost yacht club in the United States, and the tallest in the world. After the lease expired, in 1932, the club purchased its present clubhouse located at 2540 South Bayshore Drive, Coconut Grove, which is adjacent to Biscayne Bay.
