= Plymouth Congregational Church (Miami) =

- U.S. National Register of Historic Places
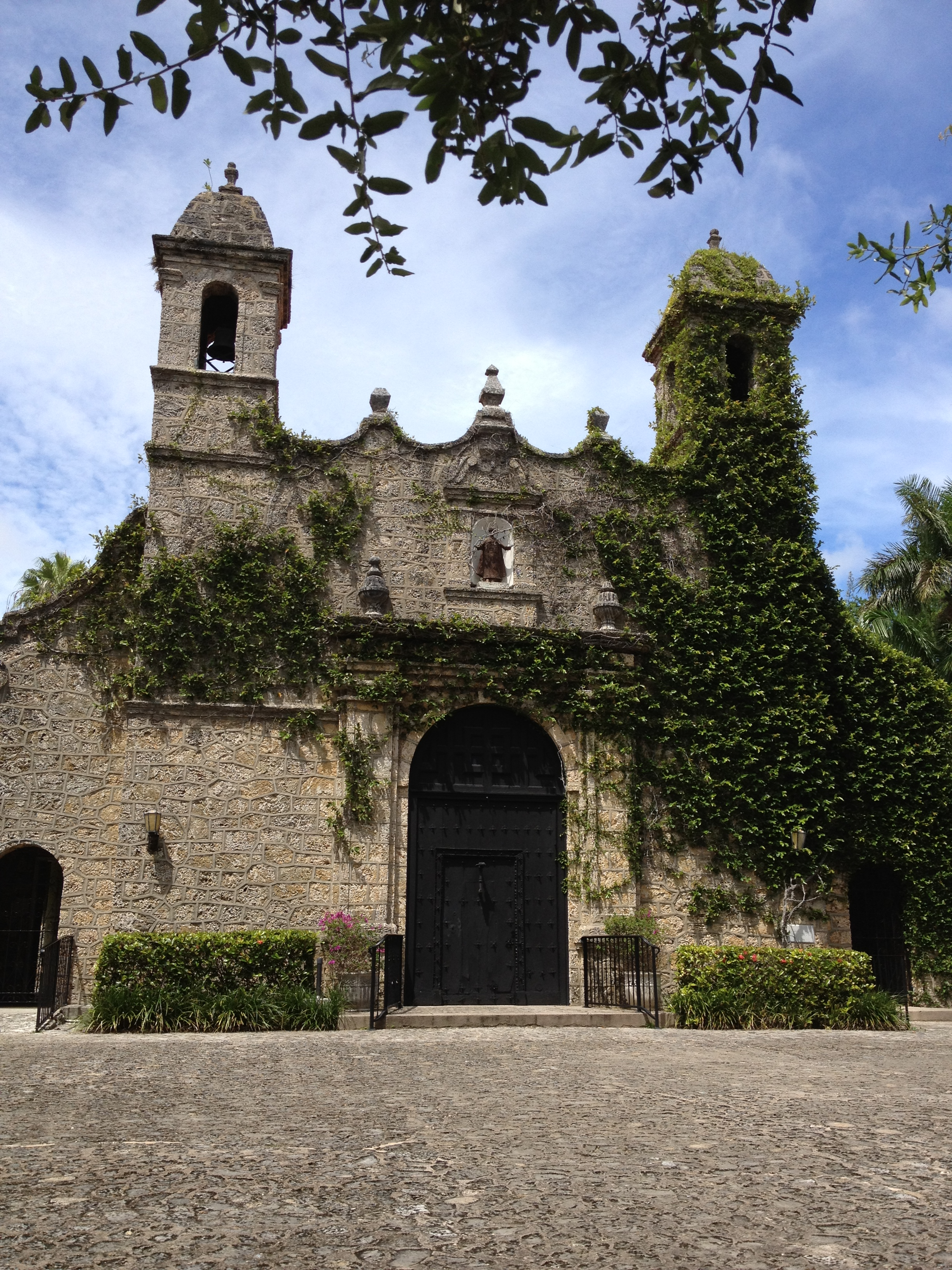

- Location within Miami Location within Florida Location within the United States
- Location: Miami, Florida
- Coordinates: 25°43′20.571″N 80°14′52.6518″W
- Built: 1917
- NRHP reference No.: 74000615
- Added to NRHP: July 23, 1974

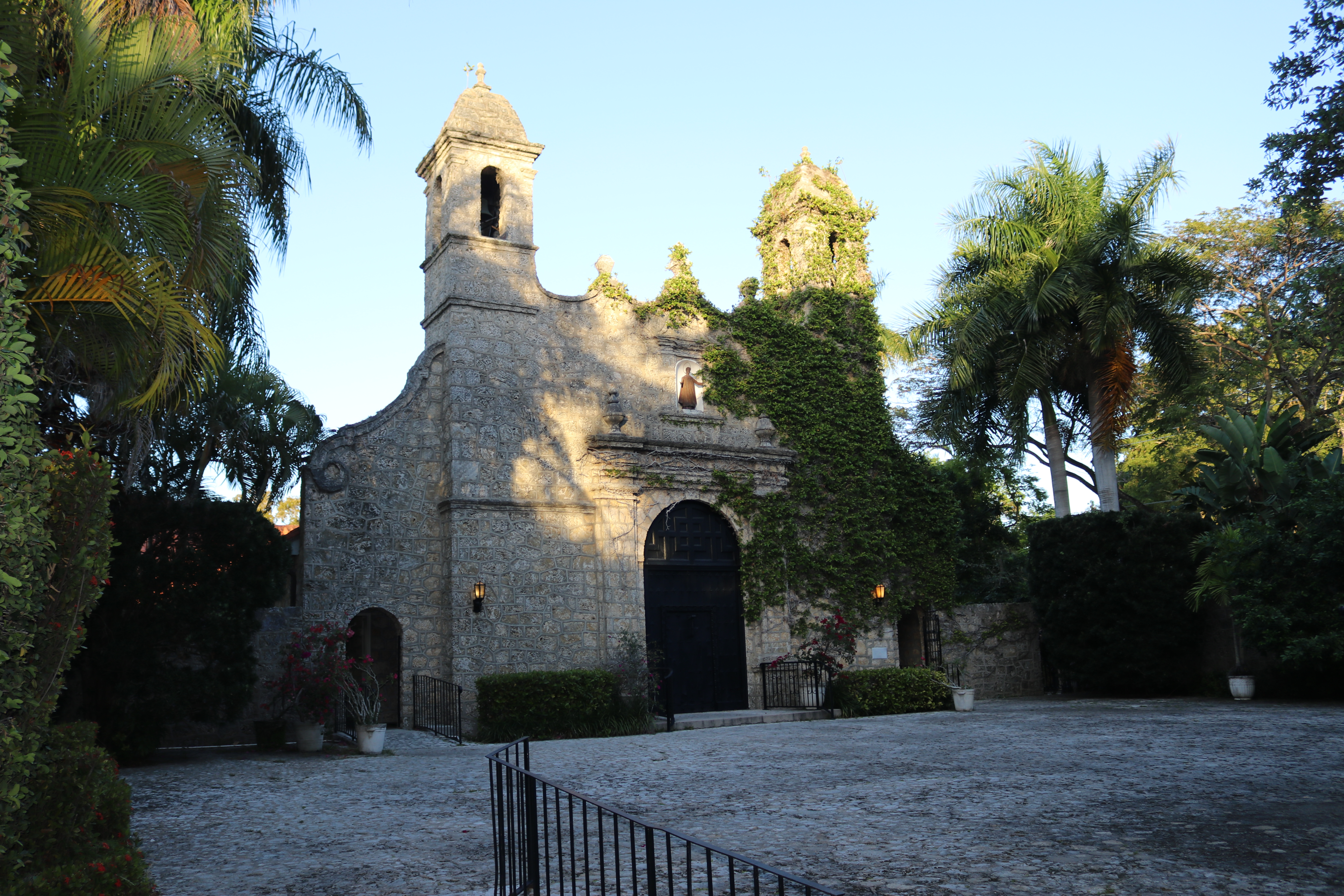
Plymouth Congregational Church as of March 2023

The Plymouth Congregational Church is a historic church located at 3429 Devon Road corner of Main Highway in the Coconut Grove in Miami, Florida.

The land was donated by George Spalding and George E. Merrick. The architect was Clinton MacKenzie. The Edifice Religious was founded in the 1897, and completed in the 1917, the church was built by a single man, Felix Rebom, using only a hatchet, a trowel, a plumb line, and a T-square. Its architecture was modeled after the old Spanish missions of Mexico. On April 18, 2012, the AIA's Florida Chapter placed Plymouth Congregational Church on its list of Florida Architecture: 100 Years. 100 Places. On July 23, 1974, it was added to the U.S. National Register of Historic Places.

Circa 1941, the WPA-sponsored American Guide Series book about Miami and environs described the church: "PLYMOUTH CONGREGATIONAL CHURCH, at Ingraham Hwy. and Devon Rd. is a reproduction of a Mexican mission. The interior of the vine-covered stone building is constructed on the lines of a basilica and the doors are said to have come from a Spanish mission in Mexico. In one of the doors is a round cat-hole, now covered with screen. Many outdoor weddings have been performed at the pulpit in the walled garden."
