= Woman's Club of Coconut Grove =

- U.S. National Register of Historic Places
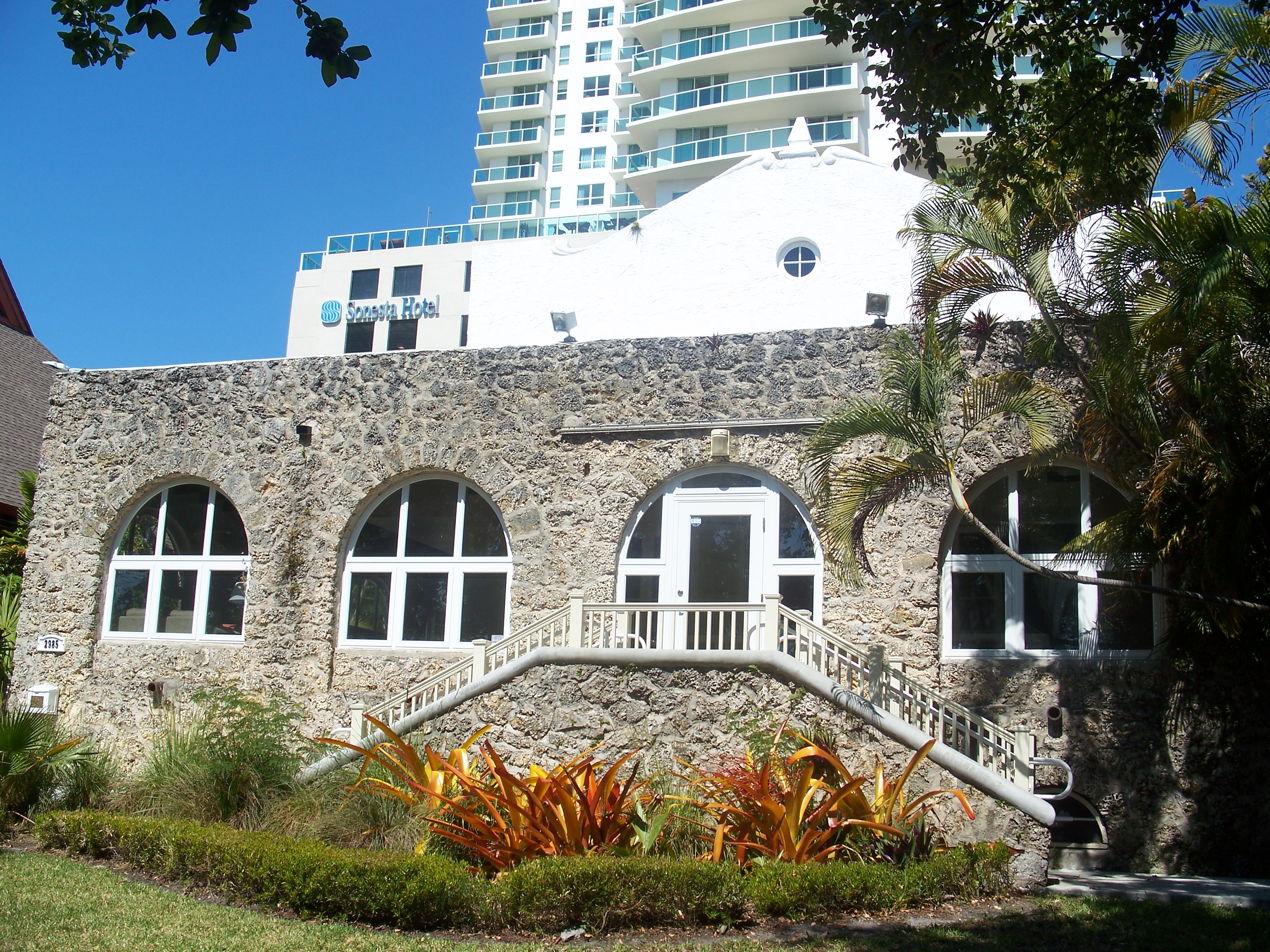

- Location within Miami Location within Florida Location within the United States
- Location: Miami, Florida
- Coordinates: 25°43′37″N 80°14′24″W
- NRHP reference No.: 75000549
- Added to NRHP: March 26, 1975

The Woman's Club of Coconut Grove (originally known as the Housekeepers Club) is a historic woman's club in Miami, Florida, United States.

== History ==
The organization was founded in 1891 by Flora McFarlane. Charter members included women from the pioneering families of Coconut Grove, and included Mrs. Kirk Munroe, Mrs. Joseph Frow, Mrs. Charles Peacock, Mrs. Charles John Peacock and Mrs. Benjamin Newbold. The first meeting of the Woman's Club of Coconut Grove was called to order on February 19, 1891, with the primary purpose of improving life for members of the community. An integral part of the group's mission was to expand education though an emphasis on literacy.

The Woman's Club of Coconut Grove was the first federated woman's club established in the State of Florida.

In 1957, Housekeeper's Club of Coconut Grove members officially changed the name of the organization to the Woman's Club of Coconut Grove.

=== The First Coconut Grove Schoolhouse ===
The first public school building in Miami-Dade county, built in 1889, was the site of the group's first meeting. Members of the Housekeepers Club of Coconut Grove raised the funds necessary to build the schoolhouse, which also served as the community's Sunday School site. The building was the area's only public school until 1894, until a larger school was constructed, and the one-room building was abandoned.

=== Pine Needles Club ===
An offshoot of the original Housekeepers Club of Coconut Grove, the Pine Needles Club offered young girls an opportunity to congregate, and discuss literature of present and past. The club was founded in 1895, in an effort to foster a spirit of community in the South Florida area. Mary Barr Munroe, wife of pioneer and author Kirk Munroe, gathered area girls for weekly outdoors readings of adventure novels, often those on the subjects of Seminole Indians and the Florida Everglades.

=== Coconut Grove Library ===
Founder Mary Barr Munroe, alongside Pine Needles Club members, worked to establish the first lending library in the City of Miami, operating out of donated space above a general store. An 1895 donation of reading materials by frequent South Florida visitor Louise Carnegie, and wife of steel tycoon Andrew Carnegie, enabled the Club to establish what became known as the Coconut Grove Reading Room. The Coconut Grove Reading Room collection grew exponentially. Housekeepers Club and Pine Needles Club members were eventually able to raise the funds required to erect the first branch of the Miami-Dade Public Library System, known as the Coconut Grove Library. The branch, completed and open for business in 1901, was built on land donated by fellow Coconut Grove pioneer, Ralph Munroe.

== Club activities ==
Numerous environmental, social, and educational endeavors have been carried out by Housekeepers Club of Coconut Grove members.

=== Environmental ===
In 1905, as part of the Florida Federation of Women's Clubs, Housekeeper Club members embarked on an endeavor to establish protective status for nearly 2,000 acres of land in Paradise Key, a valuable ecosystem, part of the Florida Everglades. By 1915, their efforts were rewarded by the State of Florida, with the creation of the Royal Palm State Park. Housekeepers Club members also spoke out against the slaughter of egrets, which was commonplace at the time.

=== Social ===
Social advocacy was a central focus of the Housekeepers Club of Coconut Grove. Group members acted in support of Seminole Indian tribes, who remained exploited to a great extent. The group participated in the delivery of humanitarian aid, working in conjunction with the American Red Cross in times of disaster or crisis. In June 1923, in an effort to continue the support of positive female role models in a rapidly changing United States, the organization sponsored the first Girl Scout of America troop in southeast Florida. Troop I nicknamed themselves "The Alligators."

=== Educational ===
In 1921, in an effort to promote community unity, the Housekeepers Club of Coconut Grove founded a community fine arts board. The board's intent also included promoting an appreciation for theatre and pageantry. The outdoor performances allowed amateur actors from the community a creative outlet, and created a steady flow of funds with which outreach activities may be carried out.

== Architecture ==
The group eventually moved into a building designed expressly for members by renowned architect Walter de Garmo. Construction was completed in 1921. The building was constructed with materials such as oolitic limestone, concrete, stone, and stucco. The rectangular building features a curvilinear gable roof, and wrap-around porch, with a series of recessed, semicircular arches. On March 26, 1975, the site was added to the United States National Register of Historic Places.

== Present day ==
The oldest civic group in Miami-Dade County, the Woman's Club of Coconut Grove, though its collection of active, associate, and lifetime dues, performs regular outreach projects, and awards annual scholarships to females exhibiting outstanding community leadership skills. In the spirit of the group's original motto, "Lend a Hand," the Women's Club has supported numerous organization over the decades, including Casa Valentina, Cancer Survivors, Hacienda Girls’ Ranch, Canine Companions, Heifer International, Miami-Dade Public Library System, as well as Miami-Dade County Public Schools.

== See also ==
- List of Registered Historic Woman's Clubhouses in Florida
- National Register of Historic Places listings in Miami, Florida
