= Tanzer 8.5 =

Sailboat class

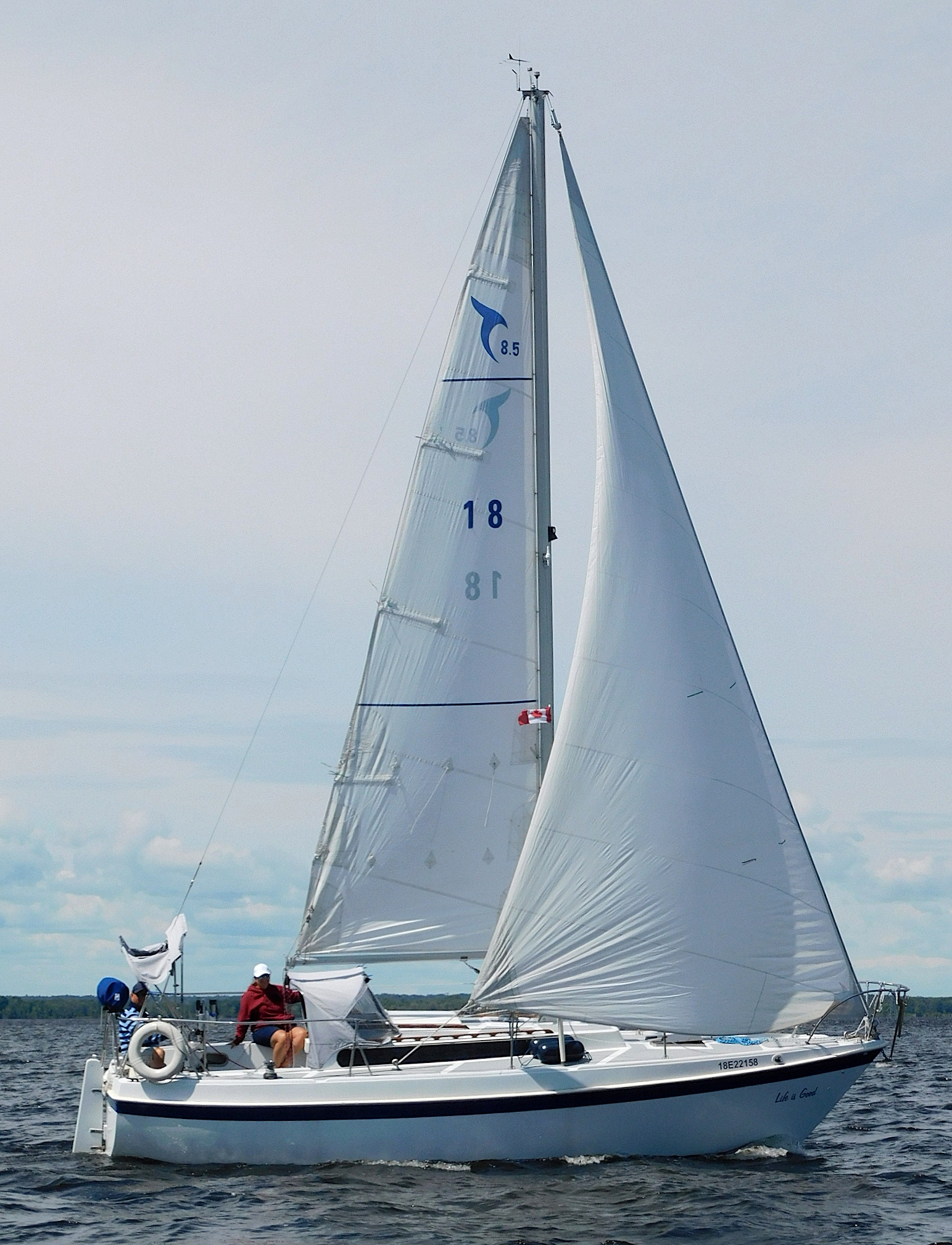

Development
- Designer: Johann Tanzer
- Location: Canada
- Year: 1978
- Builder: Tanzer Industries
- Name: Tanzer 8.5

Boat
- Crew: Two
- Draft: 4.33 ft (1.32 m)

Hull
- Type: Masthead sloop
- Construction: Fibreglass
- LOA: 27.92 ft (8.51 m)
- LWL: 23.75 ft (7.24 m)
- Beam: 9.50 ft (2.90 m)

Hull appendages
- Keel: fixed conventional fin keel

Sails
- Mainsail area: 132.75 sq ft (12.333 m^{2})
- Jib/genoa area: 205.90 sq ft (19.129 m^{2})
- Total sail area: 338.65 sq ft (31.462 m^{2})

Racing
- PHRF: 201 (average)

The Tanzer 8.5 is a Canadian sailboat, that was designed by Johann Tanzer and first built in 1978.

== Production ==
The boat was built by Tanzer Industries Limited in Dorion, Quebec. The company entered bankruptcy in 1986 and production had ended by then.

== Design ==
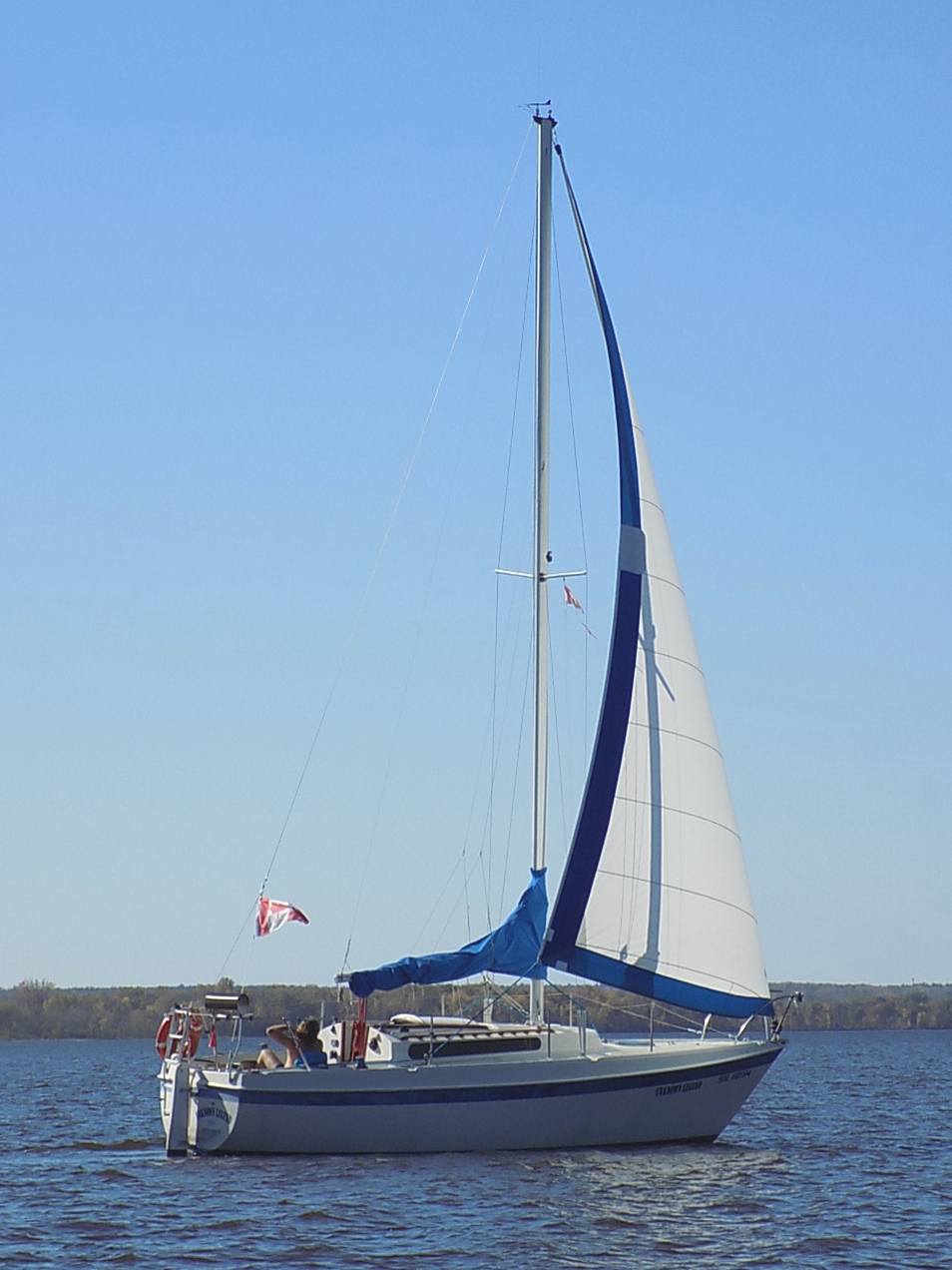
Tanzer 8.5 sailing with genoa only

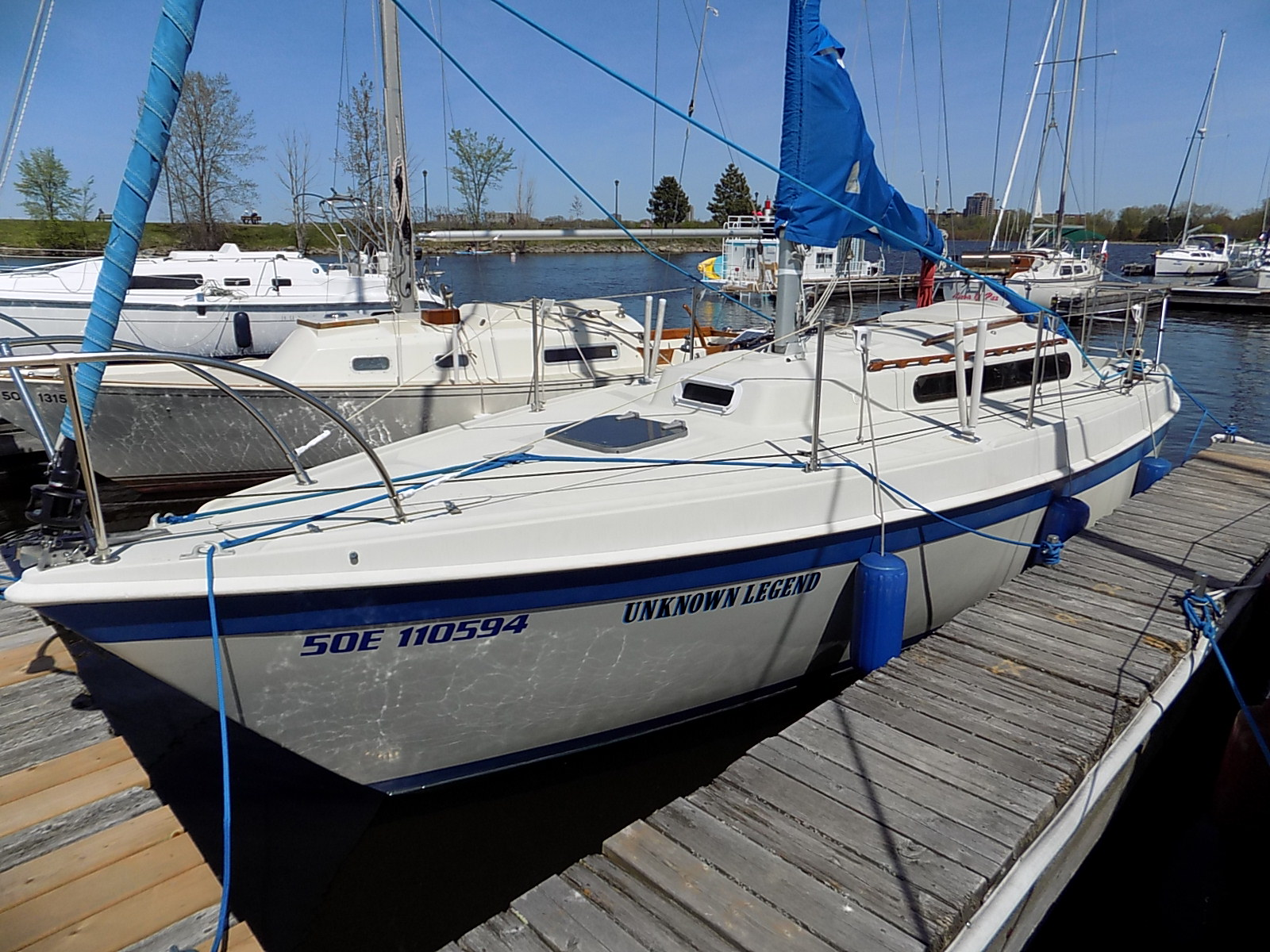
Tanzer 8.5

The Tanzer 8.5 is a small recreational keelboat, built predominantly of fibreglass, with wood trim. It has a masthead sloop rig, a transom-hung rudder and a fixed fin keel. The boat displaces 7,400 lb (3,357 kg) and carries 3,000 lb (1,361 kg) of ballast.

The boat is powered by a Japanese-made Yanmar diesel engine, supplied by a fuel tank with a capacity of 15 US gal (57 L). It also has a fresh water tank of 15 US gal (57 L) capacity.

The boat has a PHRF racing average handicap of 201 with a high of 192 and low of 234. It has a hull speed of 6.53 kn (12.09 km/h).

== Operational history ==
In a review Michael McGoldrick wrote, "The Tanzer 28 was replaced by the completely redesigned Tanzer 8.5 in 1979. Although both are 28 footers, the 8.5 is a nicer looking boat... The Tanzer 8.5 looks like a sleeker version of the Tanzer 26, and some of its cabin cushions and other components are interchangeable with the 26 foot model. Nevertheless, the 8.5 is a much larger boat inside and out, and comes with wide side decks and an inboard diesel engine. Its owners report that is also a fairly fast boat."

== See also ==
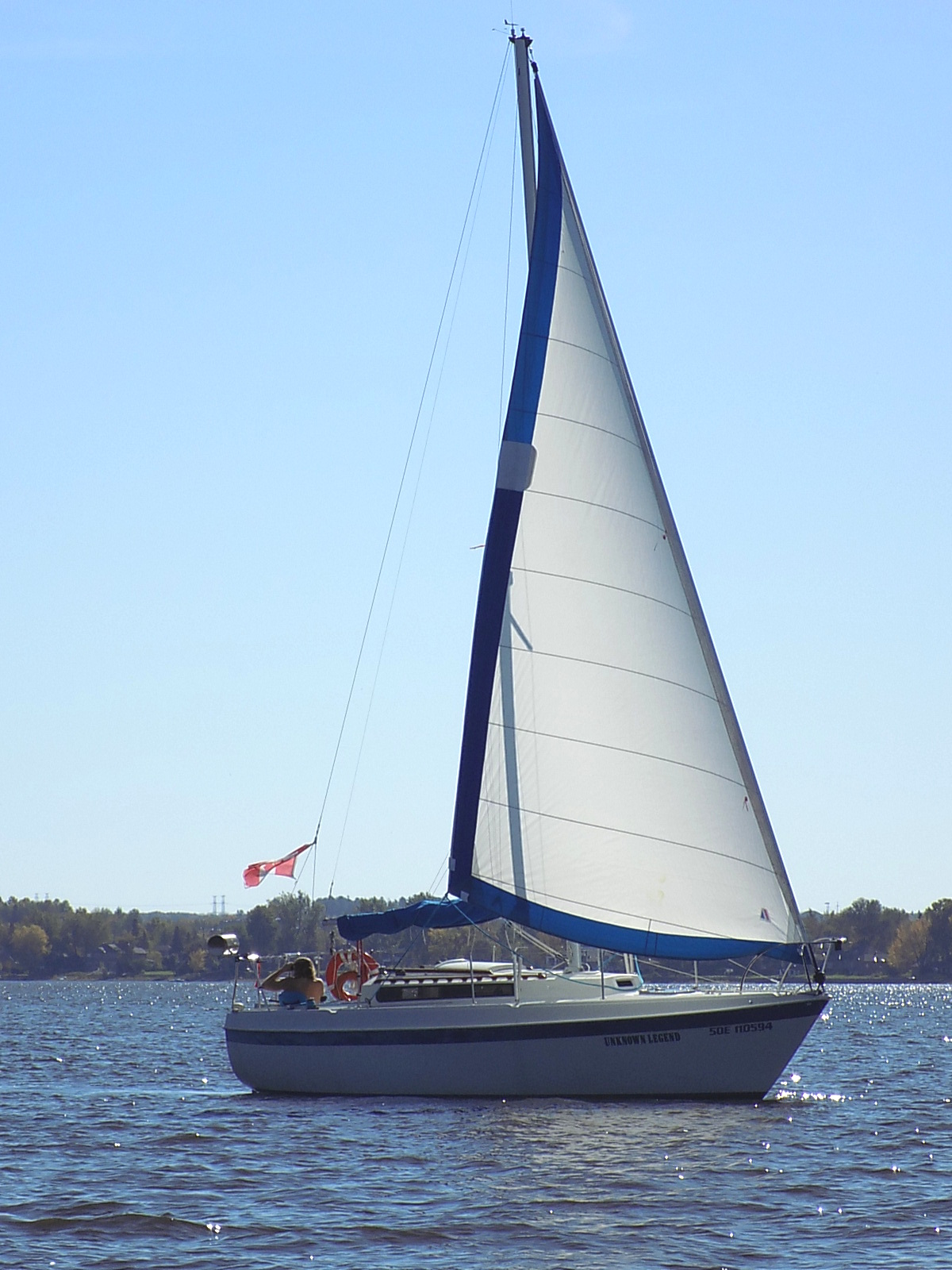
Tanzer 8.5

- List of sailing boat types

Similar sailboats

- Aloha 28
- Beneteau First 285
- Beneteau Oceanis 281
- Cal 28
- Catalina 28
- Grampian 28
- O'Day 28
- Pearson 28
- Sabre 28
- Sirius 28
- Tanzer 28
- TES 28 Magnam
- Viking 28
