= Tanzer 14 =

Sailboat class

Development
- Designer: Johann Tanzer
- Location: Canada
- Year: 1970
- Builder: Tanzer Industries
- Name: Tanzer 14

Boat
- Crew: Two
- Draft: 2.75 ft (0.84 m)

Hull
- Type: Fractional rigged sloop
- Construction: Fibreglass
- LOA: 13.50 ft (4.11 m)
- LWL: 12.42 ft (3.79 m)
- Beam: 5.50 ft (1.68 m)

Hull appendages
- Keel: centreboard keel

Sails
- Total sail area: 90 sq ft (8.4 m^{2})

The Tanzer 14 is a Canadian sailboat that was designed by Johann Tanzer and first built in 1970. The design no longer is produced.

== Production ==
The boat was built by Tanzer Industries in Canada, but production had ended by the time the company went out of business in 1986.

== Design ==
The Tanzer 14 is a small recreational sailing dinghy, built predominantly of fibreglass. It has a fractional sloop rig, a transom-hung rudder and a centreboard keel. It displaces 315 lb (143 kg).

The boat has a hull speed of 4.72 kn (8.74 km/h).

== See also ==
- List of sailing boat types
