= Tanzer 22 =

Canadian keelboat built 1970–1986

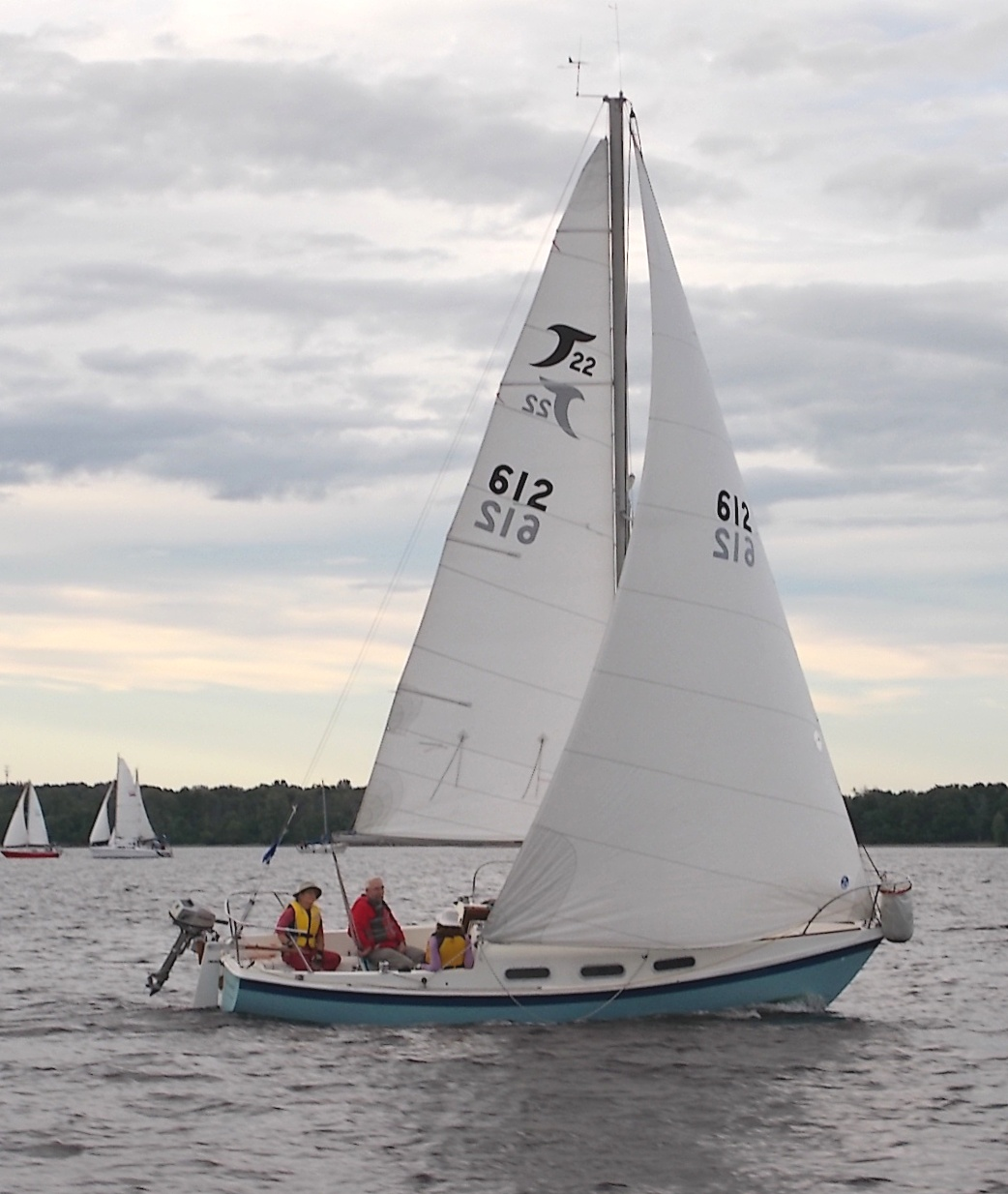

Development
- Designer: Johann Tanzer
- Location: Canada
- Year: 1970
- No. built: 2271
- Builder: Tanzer Industries Limited
- Name: Tanzer 22

Boat
- Displacement: 2,900 lb (1,315 kg)
- Draft: 3.42 ft (1.04 m)

Hull
- Type: Monohull
- Construction: Fibreglass
- LOA: 22.40 ft (6.83 m)
- LWL: 19.75 ft (6.02 m)
- Beam: 7.83 ft (2.39 m)
- Engine: outboard motor

Hull appendages
- Keel: fin keel
- Ballast: 1,250 lb (567 kg)
- Rudder: transom-mounted rudder

Rig
- Rig type: Bermuda rig
- I foretriangle height: 28.43 ft (8.67 m)
- J foretriangle base: 856 ft (261 m)
- P mainsail luff: 23.00 ft (7.01 m)
- E mainsail foot: 9.00 ft (2.74 m)

Sails
- Sailplan: Masthead sloop
- Mainsail area: 103.50 sq ft (9.615 m^{2})
- Jib/genoa area: 121.68 sq ft (11.304 m^{2})
- Total sail area: 225.18 sq ft (20.920 m^{2})

The Tanzer 22 is a recreational keelboat built by Tanzer Industries Limited from 1970 to 1986. A total of 2271 were constructed, mostly in Dorion, Quebec, and several hundred in the United States.

The masthead sloop was available with a fixed fin or a centreboard. The T/4 variant was designed for the International Offshore Rule Mk. III Quarter Ton class and has a slightly modified rudder and sailplan. The rules were changed just after its introduction, resulting in a short production run.

When Tanzer went out of business in 1986, the molds and tooling were sold to Kisber & Company, which built the boat for approximately one year. Kisber sold the design to Canadian Yacht Builders, but that company did not put the boat back into production. Later the Tanzer 22 class association acquired the sailboat design, tooling and the rights to the name, through a share-sale to its members. It is not known if they have constructed any boats.

== Design ==
Designed by Johann Tanzer the fibreglass hull has a transom-hung rudder and a large cockpit.

The cabin has sleeping accommodation for four, with a small "V"-berth, a quarter berth to starboard, and a drop-down dinette table berth on the port side. The galley is on the starboard and is equipped with a two-burner stove, an ice box and a sink. The optional head is located in the bow cabin under the "V"-berth. Cabin headroom is 51 in (130 cm).

The boat has a PHRF racing average handicap of 237 with a high of 243 and low of 222. It has a hull speed of 5.96 kn (11.04 km/h).

Variants
	22	22 CB	22 T/4
Keel	fin	centre board	centre board
Displacement	2,900 lb (1,315 kg)	3,100 lb (1,406 kg)	2,900 lb (1,315 kg)
Ballast	1,250 lb (567 kg)	1,500 lb (680 kg)	
Draft	3.42 ft (1.04 m)	4.00 ft (1.22 m)	3.40 ft (1.04 m)

== Gallery ==
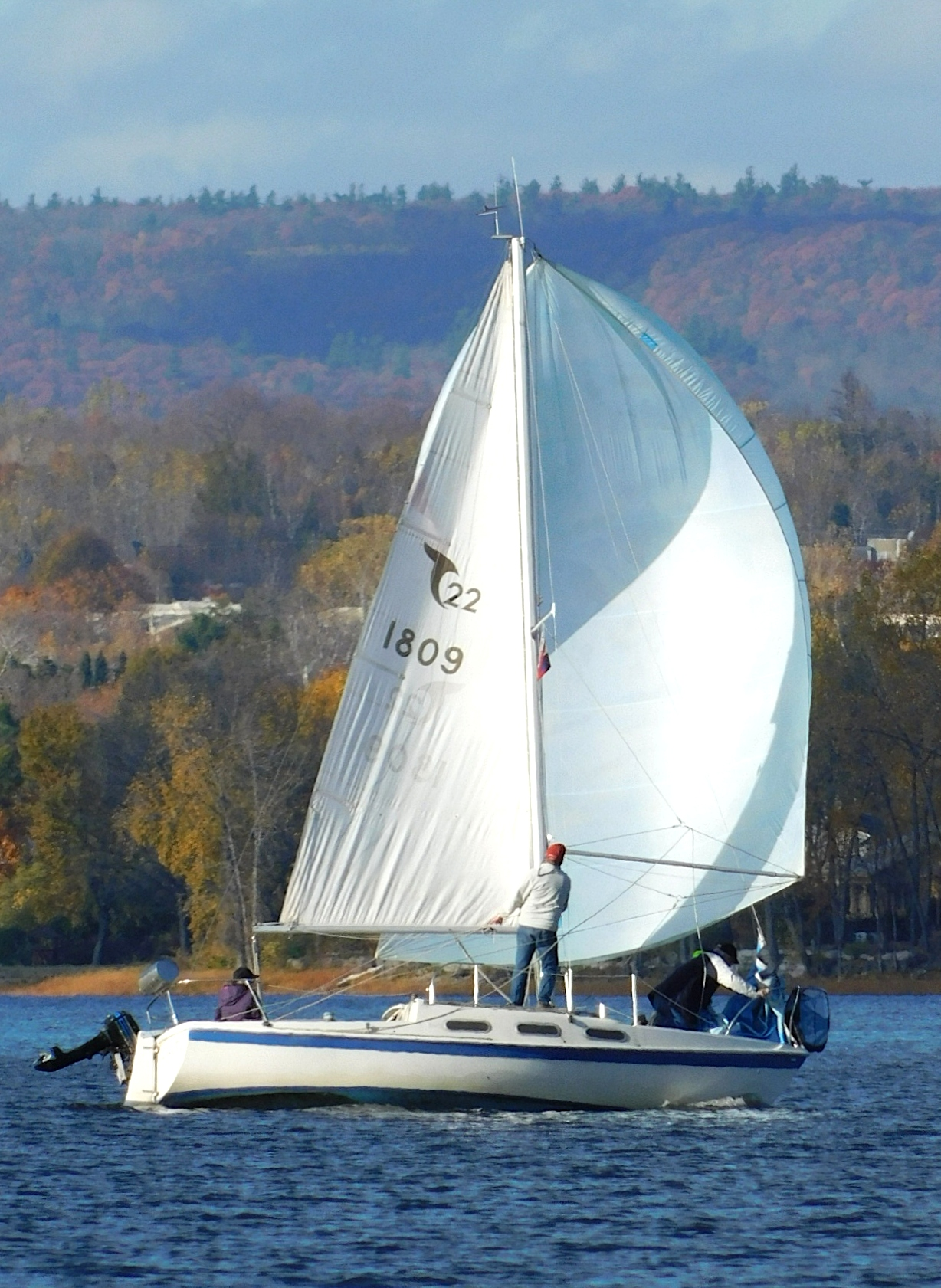
Tanzer 22 with spinnaker flying

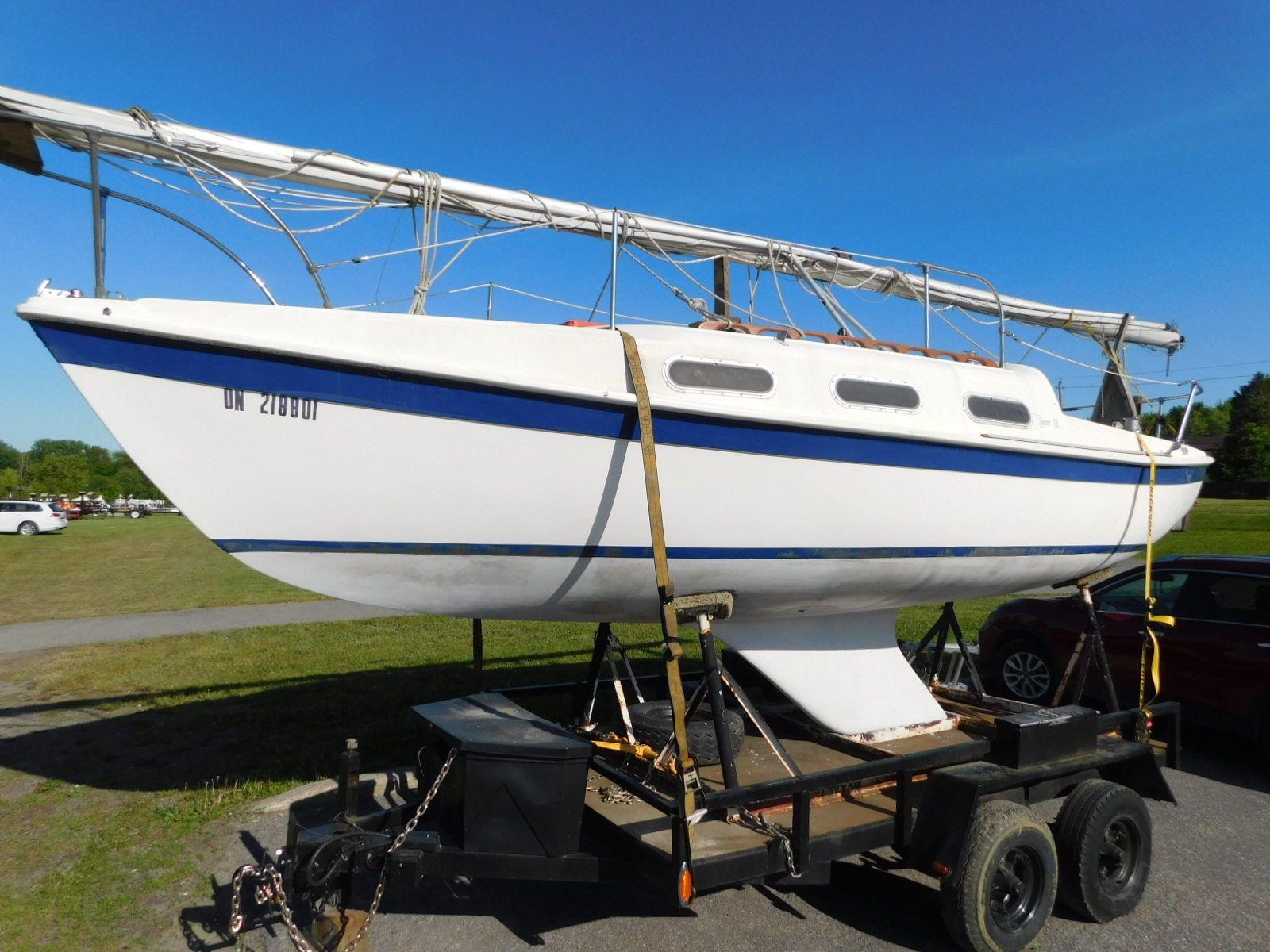
Tanzer 22 on trailer, showing keel shape

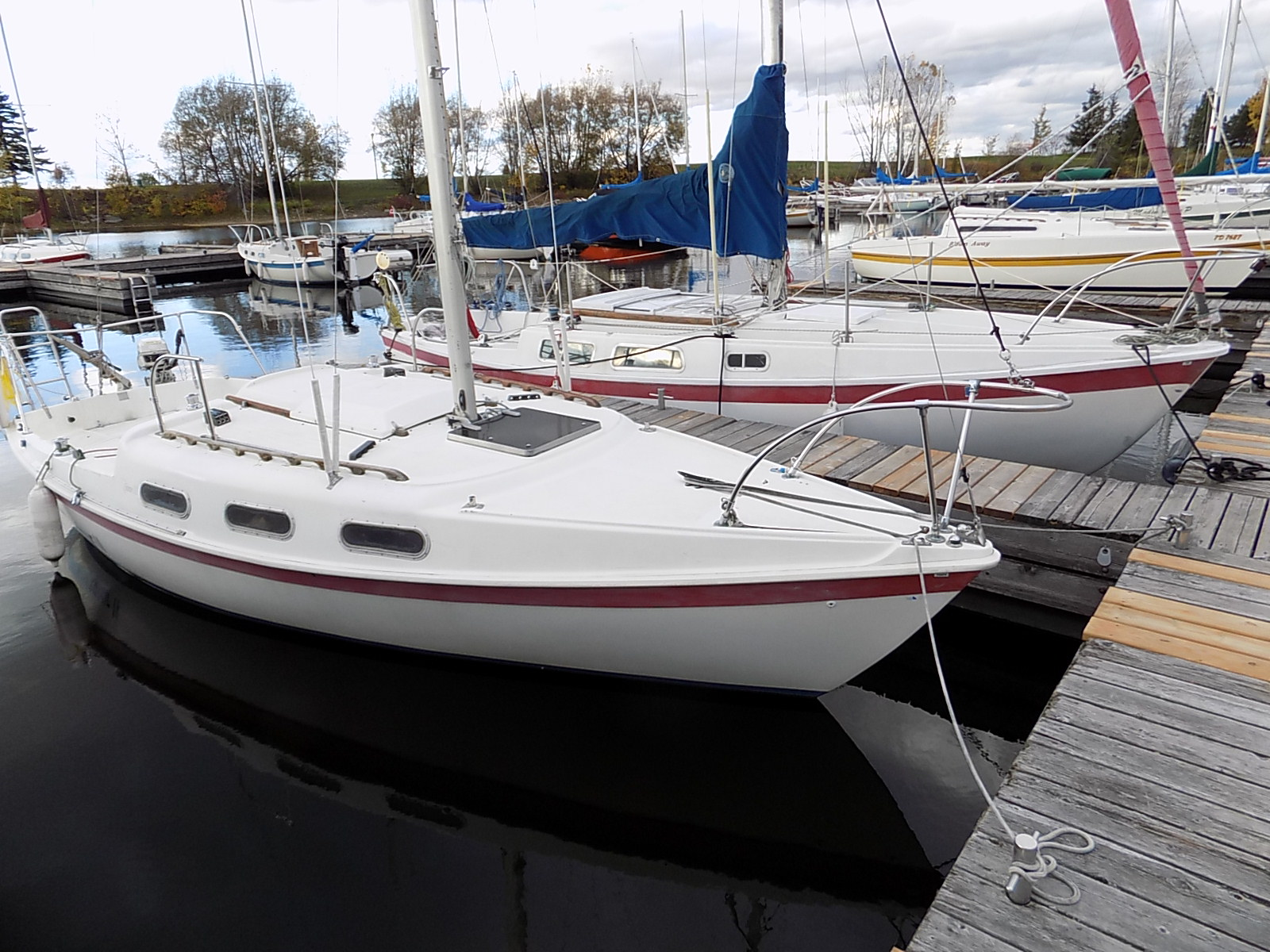
A Tanzer 22 (left) and Cal 25, showing the similarity of designs

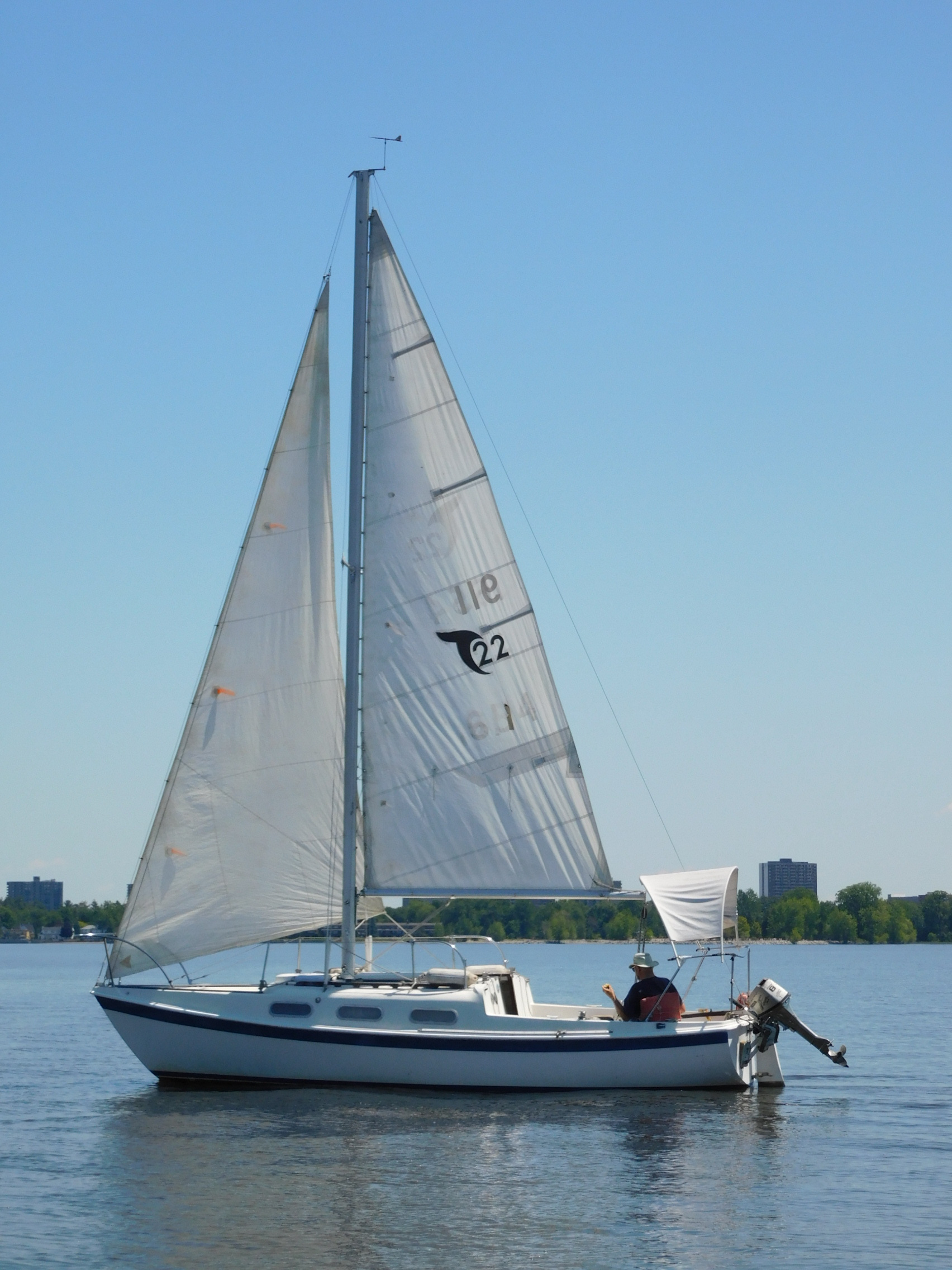
Tanzer 22 with a homemade bimini top fitted.
