= Tanzer Industries =

Canadian sailboat manufacturer

Tanzer Industries Limited
- Company type: Privately held company
- Industry: Boat building
- Founded: 1966
- Founder: Johann Tanzer
- Defunct: May 1986
- Fate: Bankruptcy
- Headquarters: Dorion, Quebec, Canada
- Products: Sailboats
- Number of employees: 85 (1986)

Tanzer Industries Limited was a Canadian boat manufacturer based in Dorion, Quebec. The company specialized in the design and manufacture of fibreglass sailboats.

== History ==
The company was founded by Johann Tanzer in 1966 and went bankrupt in May 1986. Johann Tanzer designed many of the boats his company sold.

During the period the company was in business it became one of the largest sailboat manufacturers in Canada. The most produced boat was the Tanzer 22 with 2,271 built. The company built over 8,000 boats of all types.

Aside from the main manufacturing facility, Tanzer Industries LTD, in Dorion, Quebec, the company also had operations on the US east and west coasts at Edenton, North Carolina as Tanzer Yachts, Inc. and in Arlington, Washington as Tanzer Yachts. Which plant manufactured a particular boat is indicated by the first three letters (or MIC, manufacturer identification code) of the boat's HIN, or hull identification number. A MIC of TAN or, later, ZTI means the boat was built in Quebec, a MIC of TNE that it was built in North Carolina, and a MIC of TNY that it was built in Washington.

== Sailboats ==
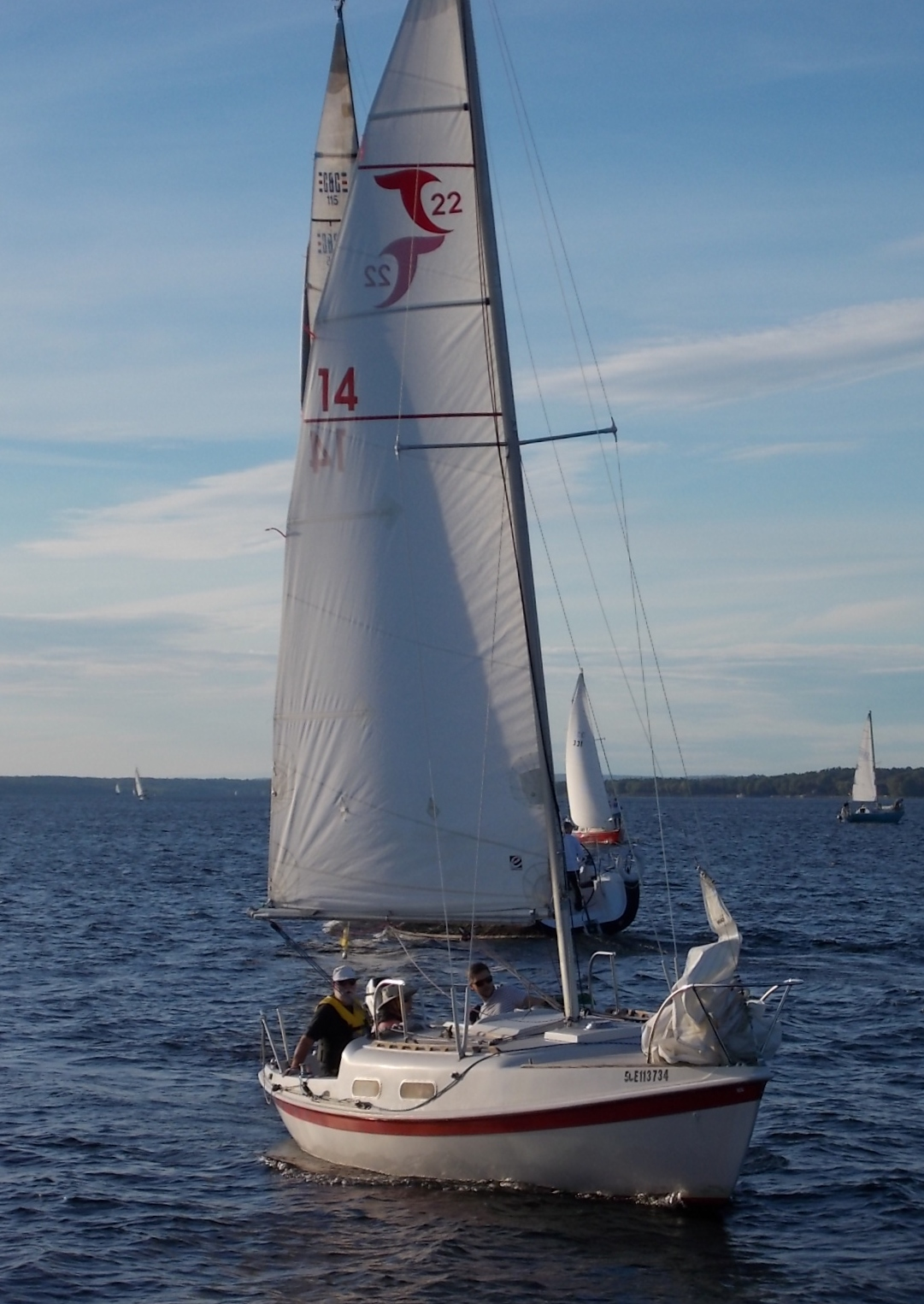
The Tanzer 22 was the company's most produced boat model

Summary of sailboats built by Tanzer Industries:

- Constellation 16
- Flying Scot
- M-16 Scow
- Nutmeg 24
- Overnighter 16
- Tanzer 7.5
- Tanzer 8.5
- Tanzer 10
- Tanzer 10.5
- Tanzer 14
- Tanzer 16
- Tanzer 22
- Tanzer 25
- Tanzer 26
- Tanzer 27
- Tanzer 28
- Tanzer 29
- Tanzer 31

== See also ==
- List of sailboat designers and manufacturers
