= Tanzer 29 =

Sailboat class

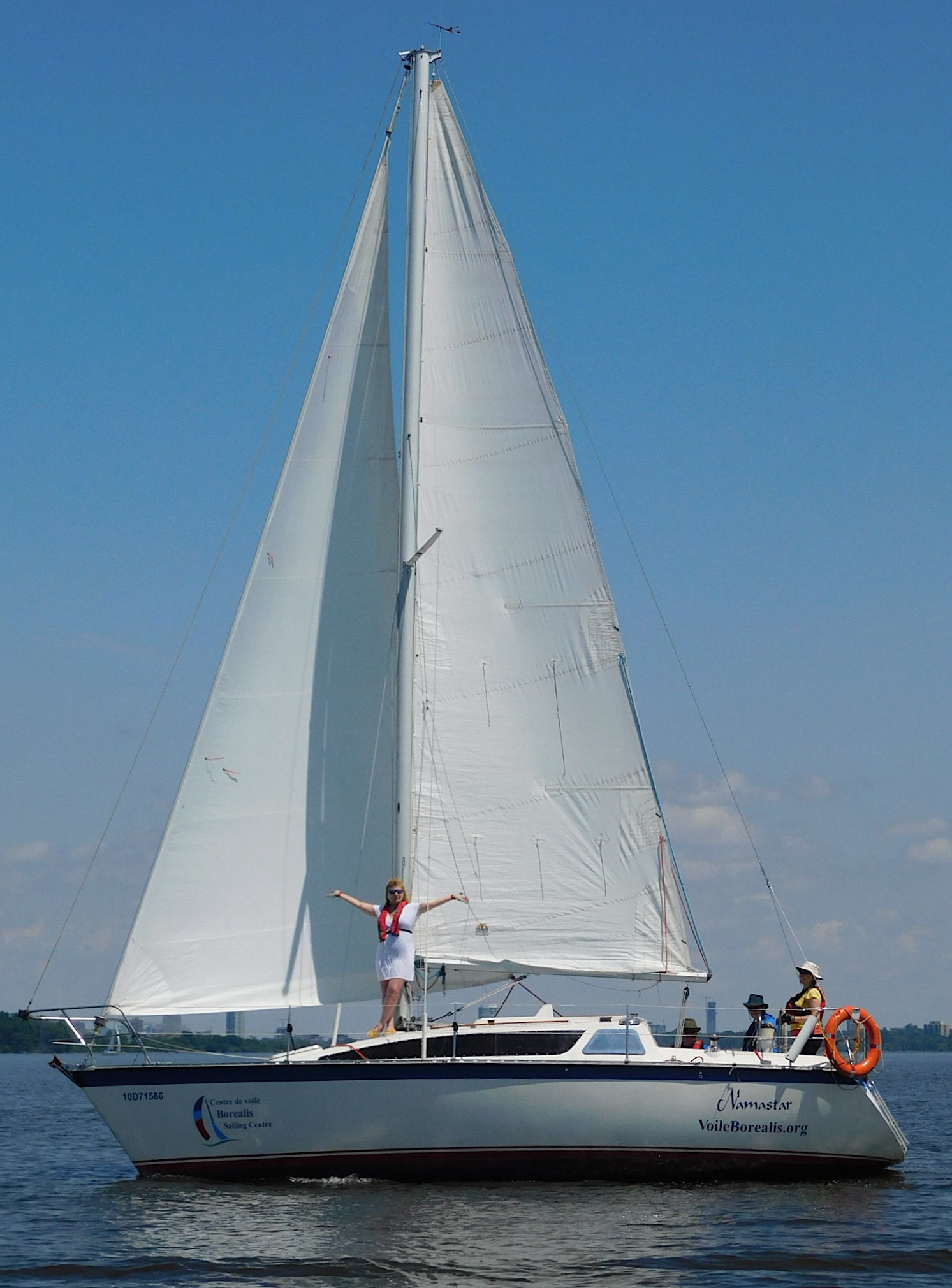

Development
- Designer: Joubert-Nivelt
- Location: Canada
- Year: 1986
- Builder: Tanzer Industries
- Name: Tanzer 29

Boat
- Crew: Two
- Draft: 5.25 ft (1.60 m) (standard keel); 4.5 ft (1.4 m) (shoal-draft keel)

Hull
- Type: Masthead sloop
- Construction: Fibreglass
- LOA: 29.00 ft (8.84 m)
- LWL: 24.25 ft (7.39 m)
- Beam: 10.25 ft (3.12 m)

Hull appendages
- Keel: fixed conventional fin keel or shoal-draft keel

Sails
- Mainsail area: 170.96 sq ft (15.883 m^{2})
- Jib/genoa area: 218.20 sq ft (20.271 m^{2})
- Total sail area: 389.16 sq ft (36.154 m^{2})

Racing
- PHRF: 174 (average)

The Tanzer 29 is a Canadian sailboat, that was designed by the French company of Joubert-Nivelt and first built in 1986.

== Production ==
Production of the boat was commenced in 1986 by Tanzer Industries of Dorion, Quebec. The company entered bankruptcy in May of that same year and production ended.

== Design ==
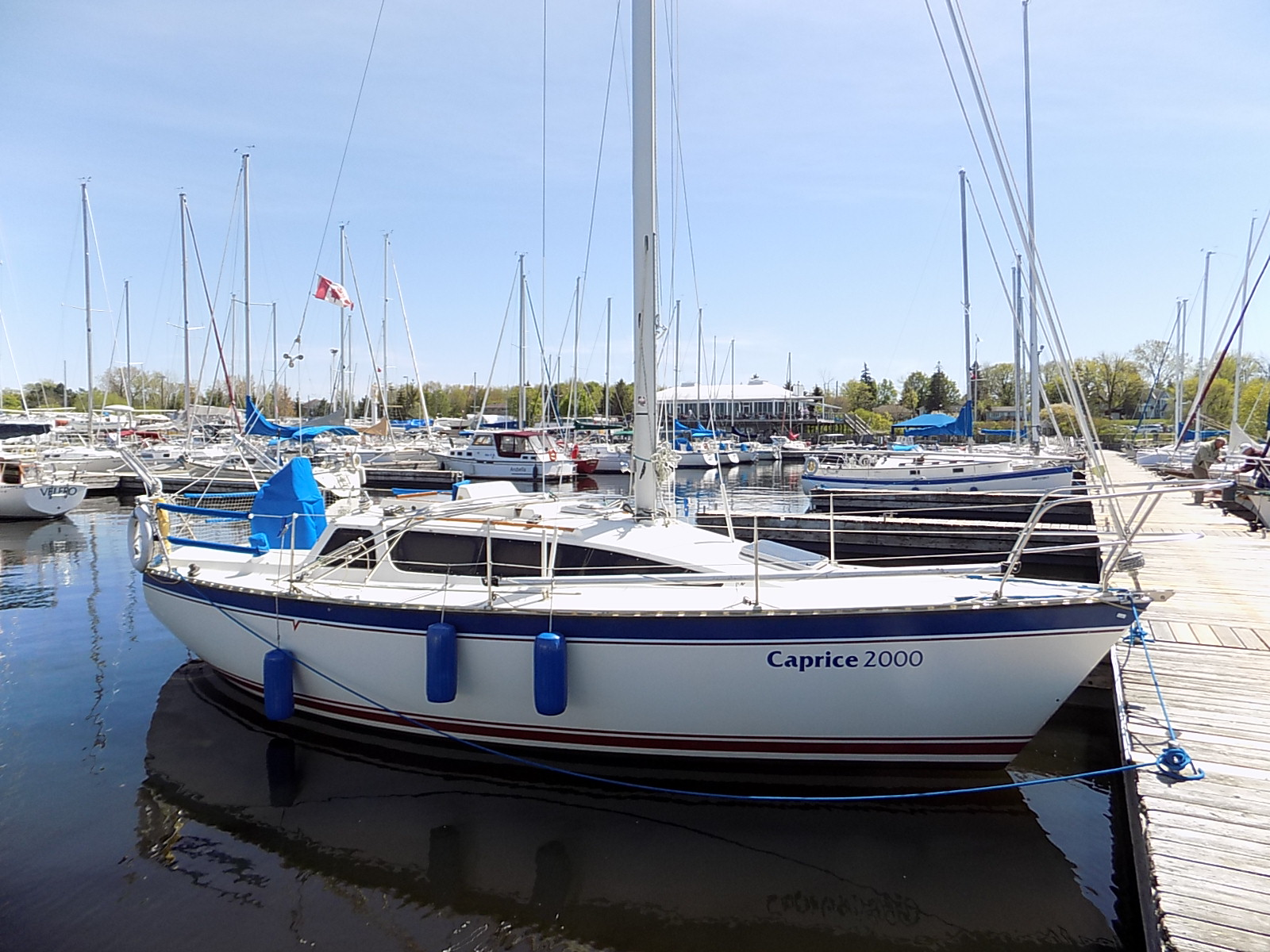
Tanzer 29

The Tanzer 29 is a small recreational keelboat, built predominantly of fibreglass, with wood trim. It has a masthead sloop rig, a spade-type rudder and a fixed fin keel or optionally, a shoal-draft keel.

The boat has a PHRF racing average handicap of 174 with a high of 177 and low of 171. It has a hull speed of 6.6 kn (12.22 km/h).

== Variants ==
Tanzer 29
With the standard keel it has a draft of 5.25 ft (1.60 m), displaces 6,900 lb (3,130 kg) and carries 2,425 lb (1,100 kg) of ballast.
Tanzer 29 SD
With the shoal-keel it has a draft of 4.5 ft (1.37 m), displaces 7,150 lb (3,243 kg) and carries 2,645 lb (1,200 kg) of ballast.

== See also ==
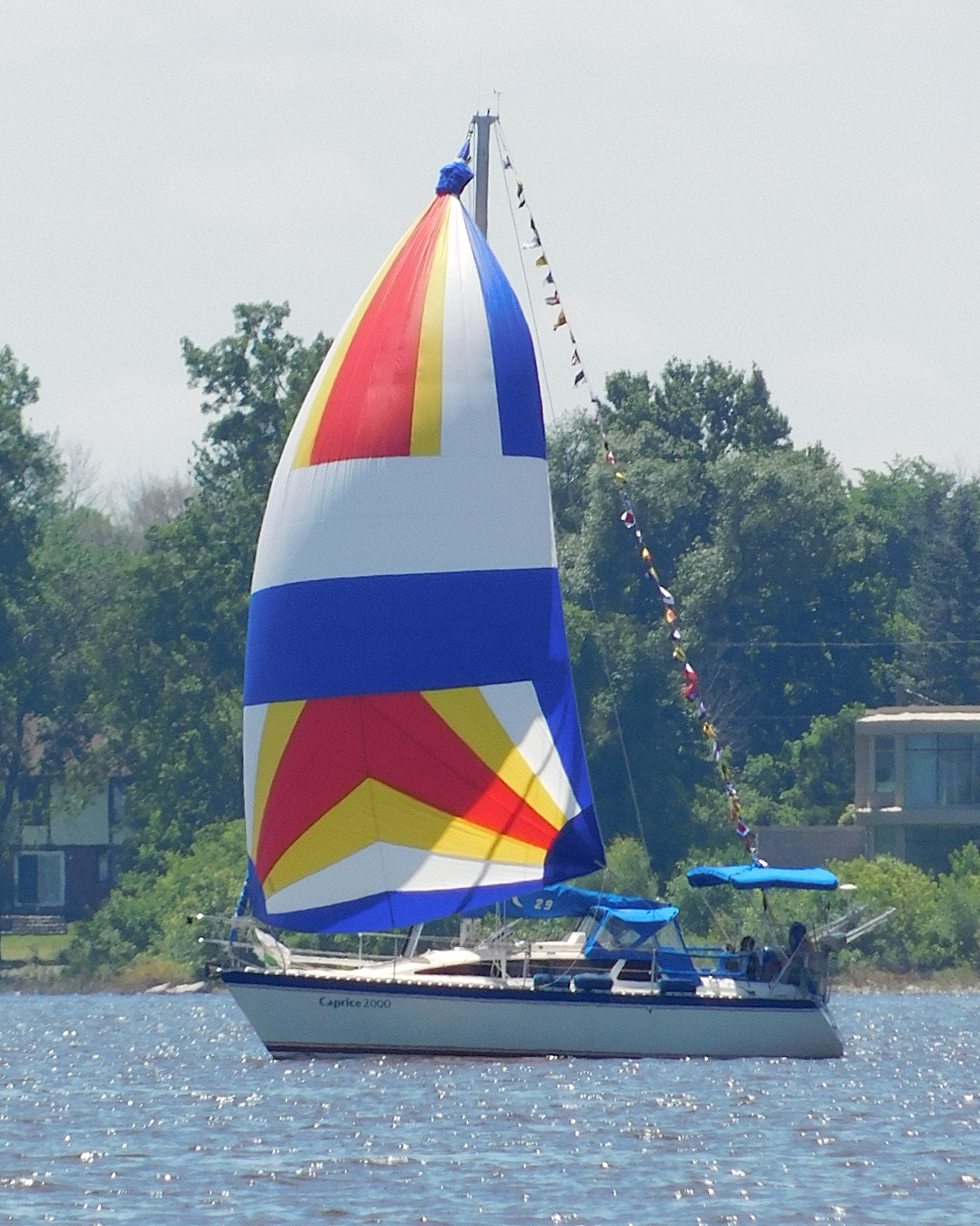
Tanzer 29 with spinnaker

- List of sailing boat types
