= Tanzer 10.5 =

1980s Canadian pilot house keelboat

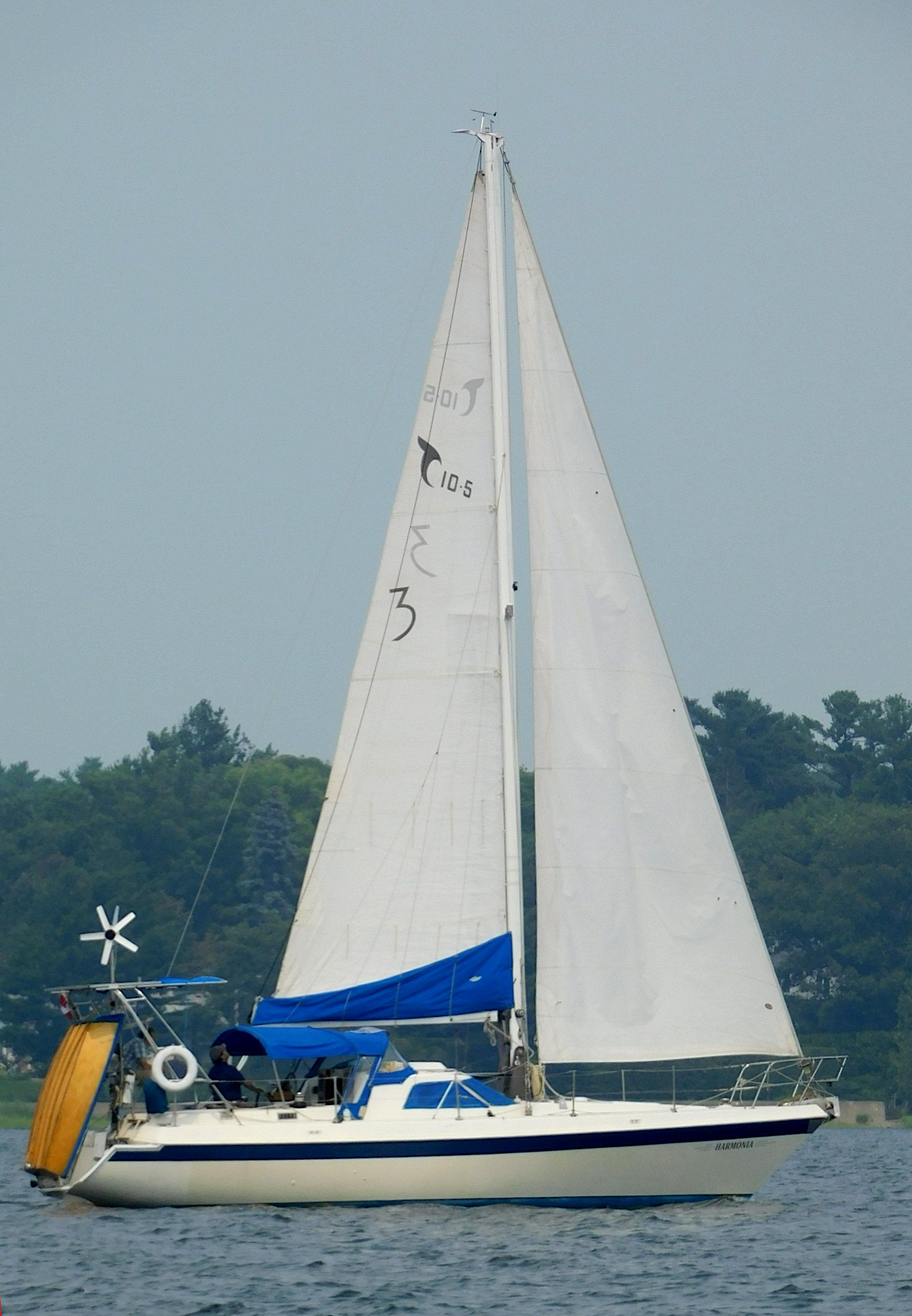

Development
- Designer: Dick Carter/Johann Tanzer
- Location: Canada
- Year: 1983
- Builder: Tanzer Industries
- Name: Tanzer 10.5

Boat
- Crew: Two
- Draft: 6.50 ft (1.98 m) swing keel down

Hull
- Type: Masthead sloop
- Construction: Fibreglass
- LOA: 34.42 ft (10.49 m)
- LWL: 27.50 ft (8.38 m)
- Beam: 11.50 ft (3.51 m)

Hull appendages
- Keel: fixed conventional fin keel or swing keel

Racing
- PHRF: 162 (fixed keel version)

The Tanzer 10.5 is a 34-foot recreational keelboat built by Tanzer Industries Limited in Dorion, Quebec from 1983 to 1986. It has a pilothouse and inside steering. The pilothouse has wrap-around windows and a helm position to starboard.

It was developed from the 1980 Dick Carter designed Tanzer 10, with contributions from Johann Tanzer. The fibreglass hull has a transom and skeg-hung rudder with wheel steering.

It was available with a fixed keel with a draft of 5.92 ft (1.80 m), and a PHRF racing average handicap of 162.

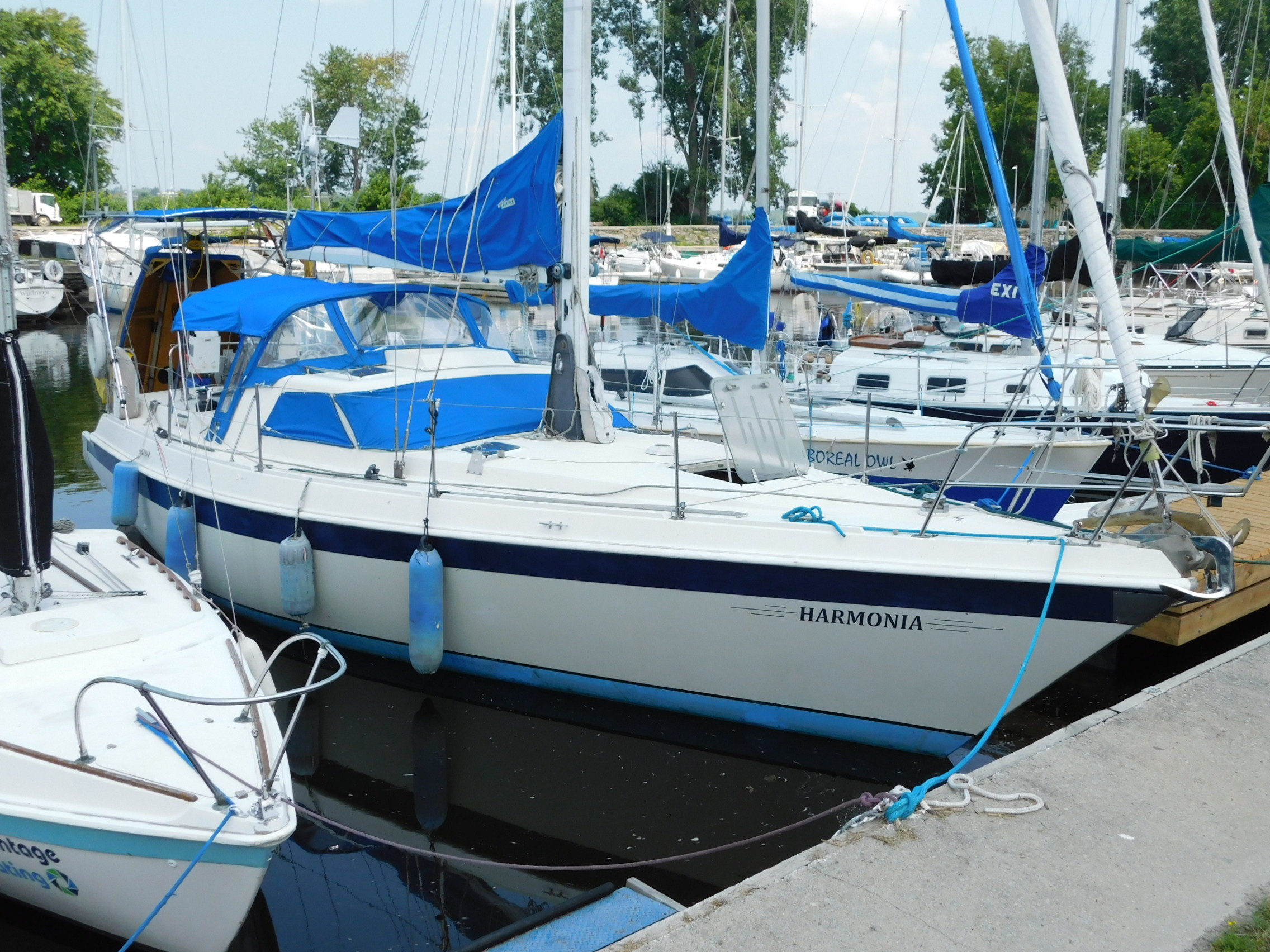
Tanzer 10.5

The Tanzer 10 LK has a lifting ballasted keel, with a draft of 6.50 ft (1.98 m) with the keel down and 2.08 ft (0.63 m) with it up. The keel is hydraulically raised and its housing is located inside both the main cabin and the pilothouse. This version has a PHRF racing average handicap of 153 with a high of 153 and low of 156. The Tanzer 10.5 was also available with a shoal keel.

The boat displaces 13,000 lb (5,897 kg) and carries 5,700 lb (2,585 kg) of ballast. It has a hull speed of 7.03 kn (13.02 km/h).

The boat is powered by a 30 hp (22 kW) inboard Yanmar.

Aft of the pilothouse is the head with a shower. Next to that is the galley, with a three-burner propane stove and oven. The main cabin is two steps down from the pilothouse and features a dinette table with seating for eight people. The table can be converted to a double berth. In the bow are two separate berths, with the starboard one above the port one. There are seven deck hatches and three opening ports for ventilation. There is a cabin aft of the relatively small cockpit, connected by a small passage to the main cabin.

It has a masthead sloop rig. Sails include a self-tending jib, 110% and 150% genoas, as well as a poleless spinnaker of 1,300 sq ft (120 m^{2}) intended only for cruising use.
