= Tanzer 26 =

Canadian keelboat built 1974 to 1985

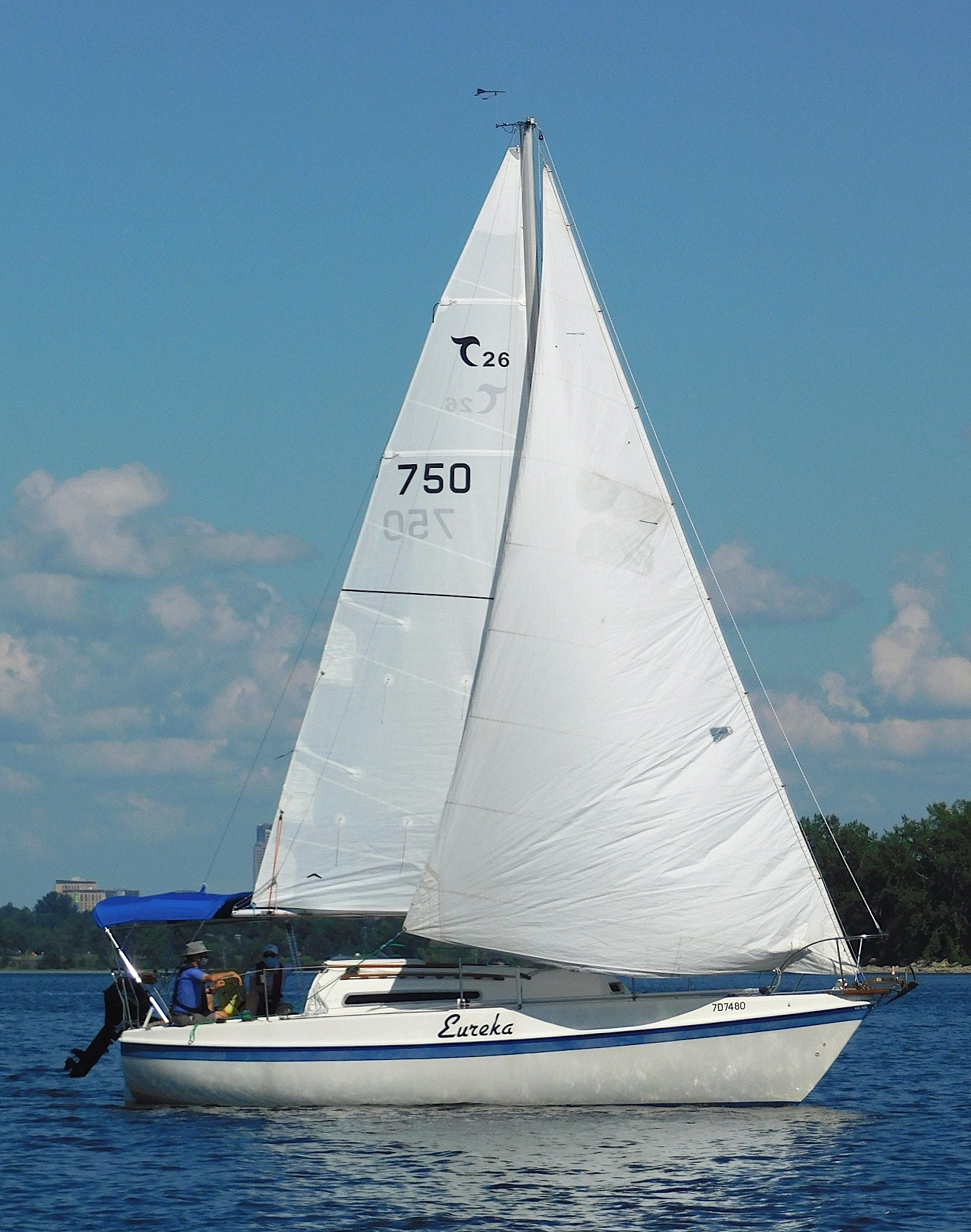

Development
- Designer: Johann Tanzer
- Location: Canada
- Year: 1974
- No. built: 960
- Builder: Tanzer Industries
- Name: Tanzer 26

Boat
- Draft: 3.83 ft (1.17 m)

Hull
- Type: Masthead sloop
- Construction: Fibreglass
- LOA: 26.33 ft (8.03 m)
- LWL: 22.50 ft (6.86 m)
- Beam: 8.67 ft (2.64 m)

Hull appendages
- Keel: fixed fin keel

Sails
- Mainsail area: 129.41 sq ft (12.023 m^{2})
- Jib/genoa area: 159.49 sq ft (14.817 m^{2})
- Total sail area: 288.90 sq ft (26.840 m^{2})

Racing
- PHRF: 216

The Tanzer 26 is a recreational keelboat built from 1974 to 1985 by Tanzer Industries of Dorion, Quebec, Canada. A total of 960 were built.

== Design ==
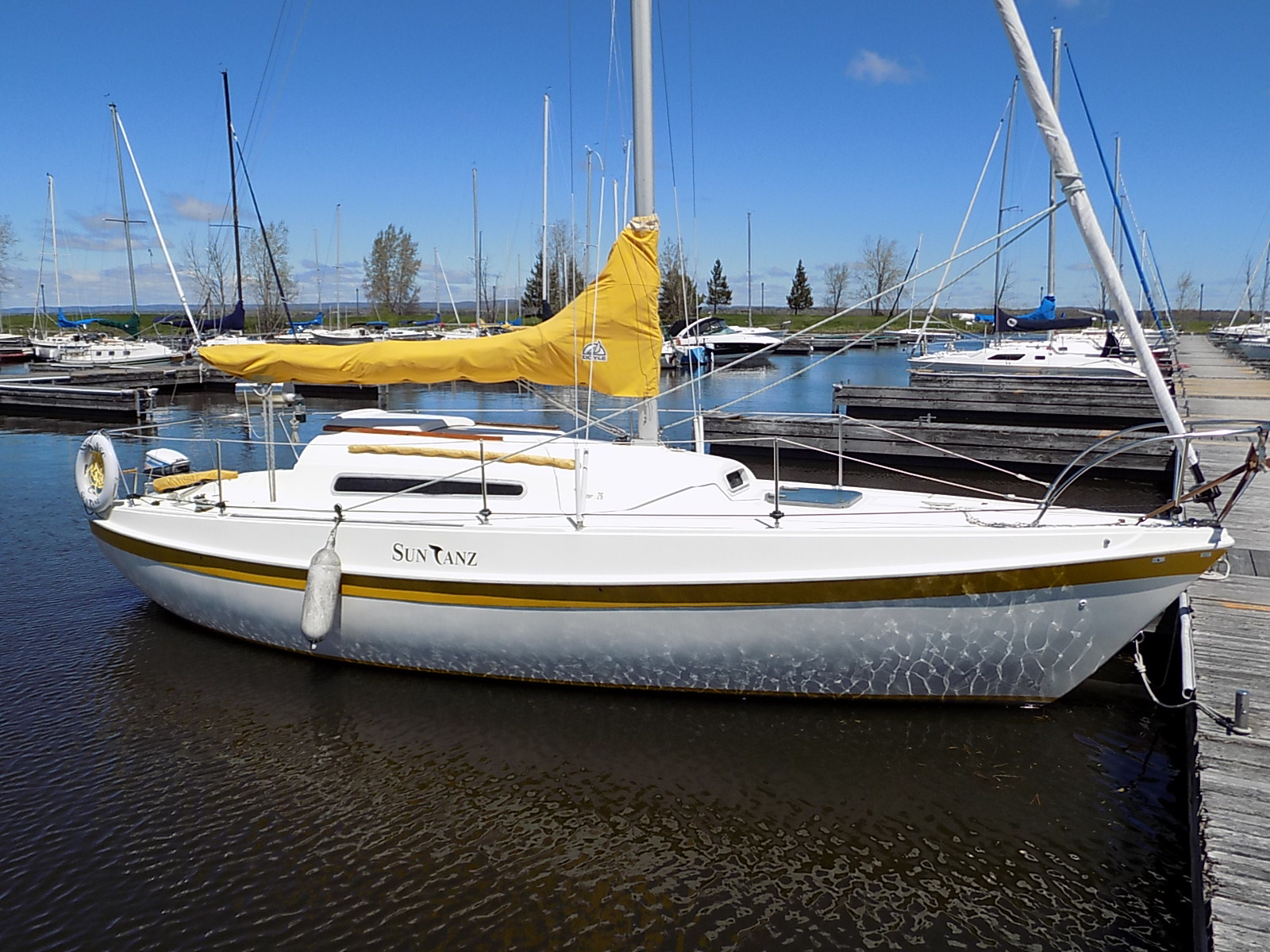
Tanzer 26

Designed by Johann Tanzer for racing, day sailing and cruising, the Tanzer 26 is built predominantly of fibreglass, with wood trim. It has a masthead sloop rig, a transom-hung rudder and a fixed fin keel. It displaces 4,350 lb (1,973 kg) and carries 1,950 lb (885 kg) of ballast. The hinged mast is mounted on the cabin top.

The boat was built with a standard keel that gives a draft of 3.83 ft (1.17 m). Most examples built were powered by an outboard motor, but an inboard-mounted Japanese-built Yanmar Diesel engine was optional.

The accommodations include a forward cabin with a "V" berth with a hatch for ventilation and a folding door for privacy. The main cabin has a settee double berth and a quarter berth. The head is on the port side of the cabin and has a ventilator, with the galley on the starboard side. There is a folding table as well, that stows against the bulkhead. Boats built in the 1980s has a different window configuration and improved forward hatch.

The large cockpit is self-draining and can seat six or more adults, with a sail locker and outboard motor fuel tank locker. An anchor locker is mounted forward. The mainsheet traveller is mounted to the bridge deck and jib sheet tracks are installed on the side toe rails.

The boat has a PHRF racing average handicap of 216. It has a hull speed of 6.36 kn (11.78 km/h).

In his description of the design, Richard M. Sherwood wrote, "This is a combination boat, for racing or cruising. The cockpit is large, so she is also a day sailer, with capacity for six or more. With a fairly high ballast/displacement ratio, she can be expected to be stiff."
