= Tanzer 7.5 =

Recreational keelboat built 1977–1985

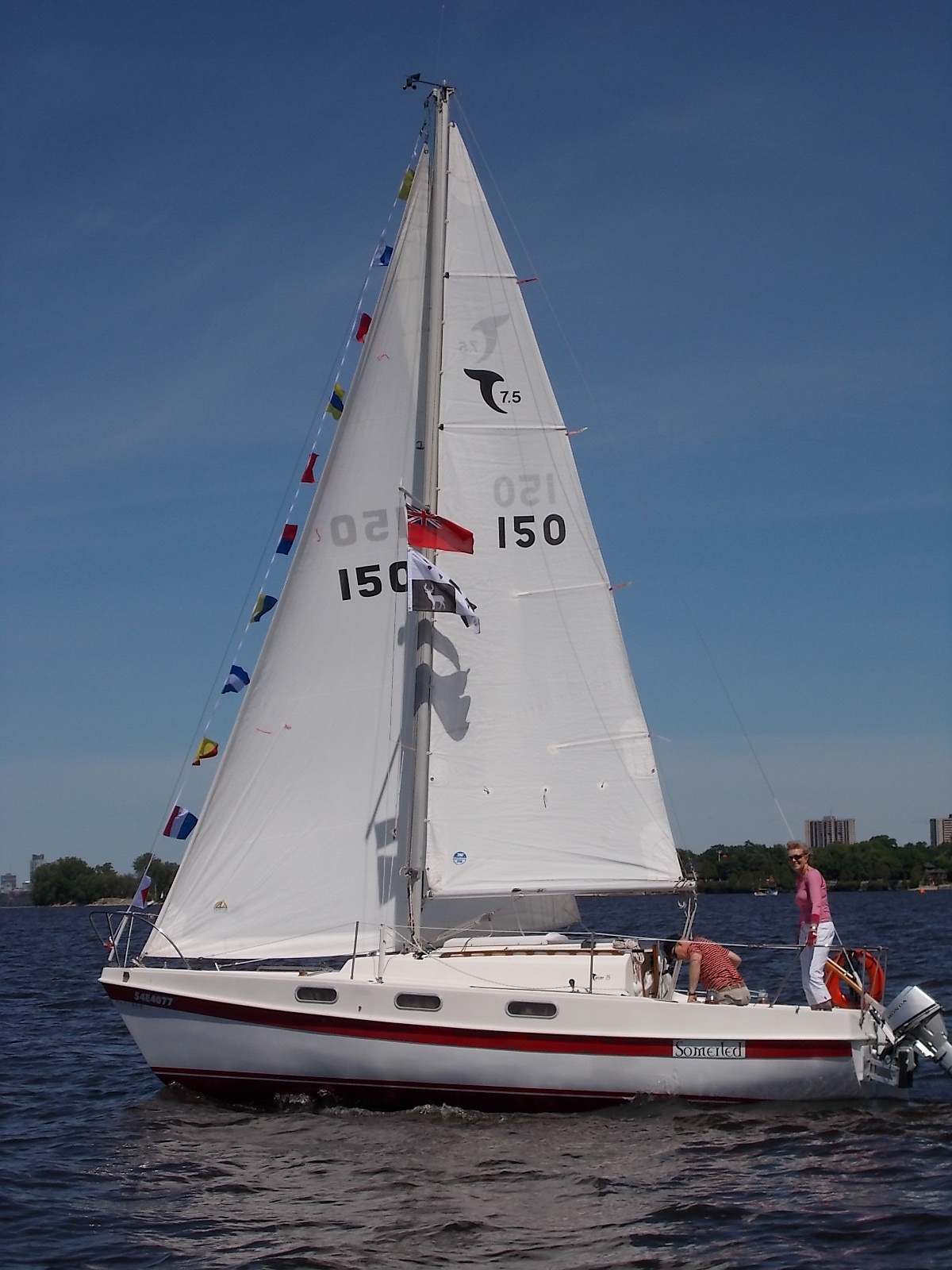

Development
- Designer: Johann Tanzer
- Location: Canada
- Year: 1977
- Builder: Tanzer Industries
- Name: Tanzer 7.5

Boat
- Crew: Two
- Draft: 4.00 ft (1.22 m)

Hull
- Type: Masthead sloop
- Construction: Fibreglass
- LOA: 24.52 ft (7.47 m)
- LWL: 21.83 ft (6.65 m)
- Beam: 8.00 ft (2.44 m)

Hull appendages
- Keel: fixed conventional fin keel or shoal draft keel

Sails
- Mainsail area: 100.46 sq ft (9.333 m^{2})
- Jib/genoa area: 145.56 sq ft (13.523 m^{2})
- Total sail area: 246.02 sq ft (22.856 m^{2})

Racing
- PHRF: 228 (average)

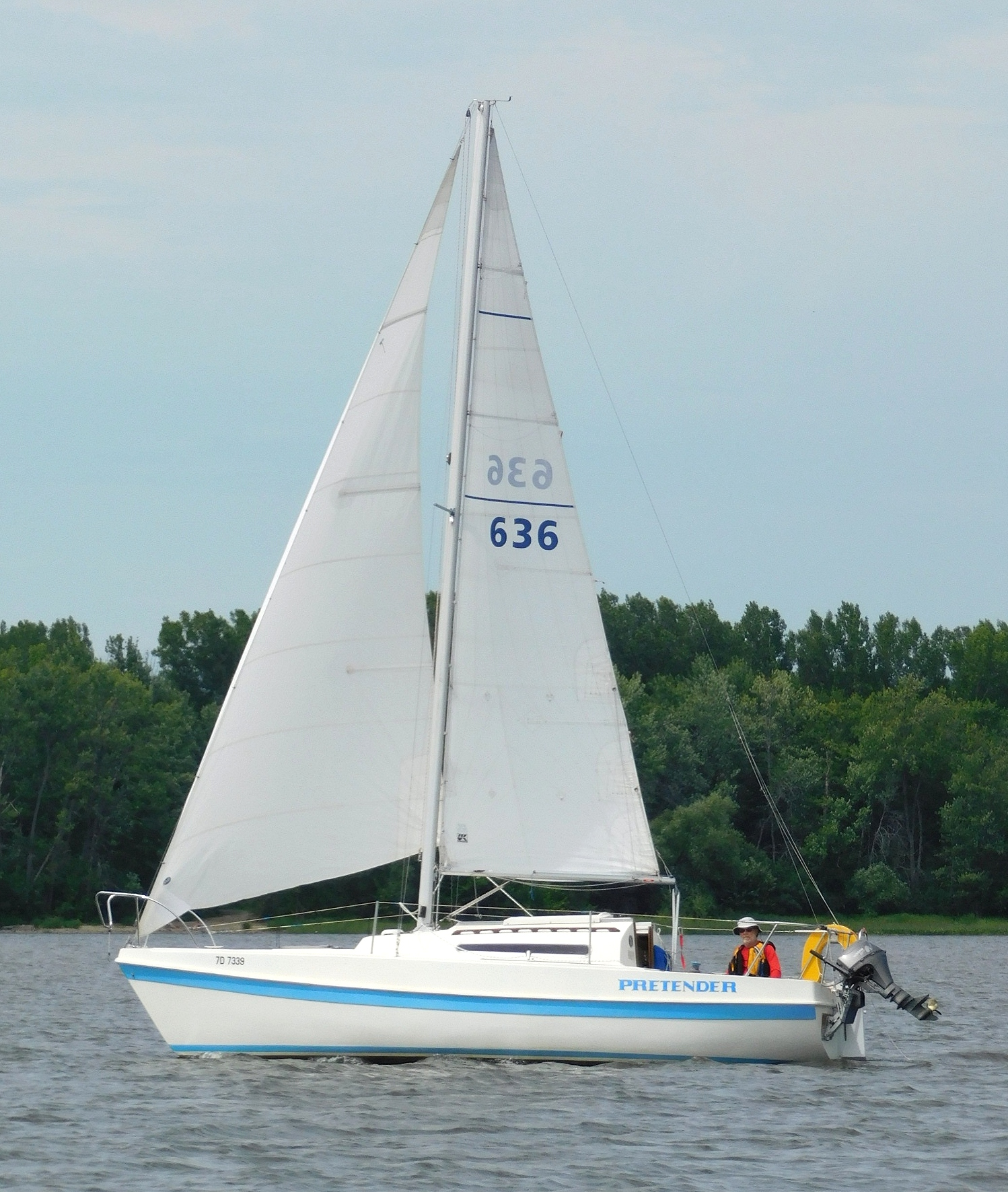
1980s Tanzer 7.5 with updated window arrangement

The Tanzer 7.5 is a recreational keelboat built from 1977 to 1985 by Tanzer Industries Limited in Dorion, Quebec. A total of 790 boat were built, including some in Tanzer's US subsidiaries.

Designed by Johann Tanzer, the fibreglass hull has a transom-hung rudder. It has a hull speed of 6.26 kn (11.59 km/h).

With the fixed fin keel it has a PHRF of 201, a 3,800 lb (1,724 kg) displacement, 1,600 lb (726 kg) of ballast and a draft of 4.00 ft (1.22 m). The shoal draft version has a PHRF of 228 with a high of 237 and low of 207. 4,150 lb (1,882 kg) displacement, 1,950 lb (885 kg) of ballast and a draft of 2.67 ft (0.81 m).

It has four berths, with a small "V"-berth and two straight settee berths in the main cabin around a folding table. The galley is located on both sides just aft of the companionway ladder. The galley is equipped with an ice box and a sink to starboard, with a two-burner stove to port. The head is located just aft of the bow cabin on the port side. Cabin headroom is 68 in (173 cm). Tanzer 7.5s built in the 1970s had three portlites on each side while those built in the 1980s instead had a single long window on each side.

It has a masthead sloop rig. A self-tacking jib on a boom was a factory option.
