= Johann Tanzer =

Sailboat designer (1927–2016)

- Born: 3 January 1927; Velden am Wörther See, Carinthia, Austria
- Died: 23 October 2016 (age 89); Montreal, Quebec, Canada
- Occupations: Sailboat designer, builder, businessman
- Known for: Tanzer Industries

Johann Tanzer (1927-2016) was a Canadian sailboat designer, who founded the sailboat manufacturer that bore his name, Tanzer Industries, in 1966.

== Early life ==
Johann Tanzer was born on 3 January 1927 in the village of Velden am Wörther See, in the province of Carinthia, Austria. In 1941 Tanzer began his apprenticeship in shipbuilding at the Valentin Feinig (Feinig Werft) boat yard on the shores of the Wörthersee. The shipyard built sailing yachts, cruiser-racer and motor boats. Johann Tanzer completed his apprenticeship before being drafted into the Navy on Jan. 3, 1945, his birthday.

== Professional life ==
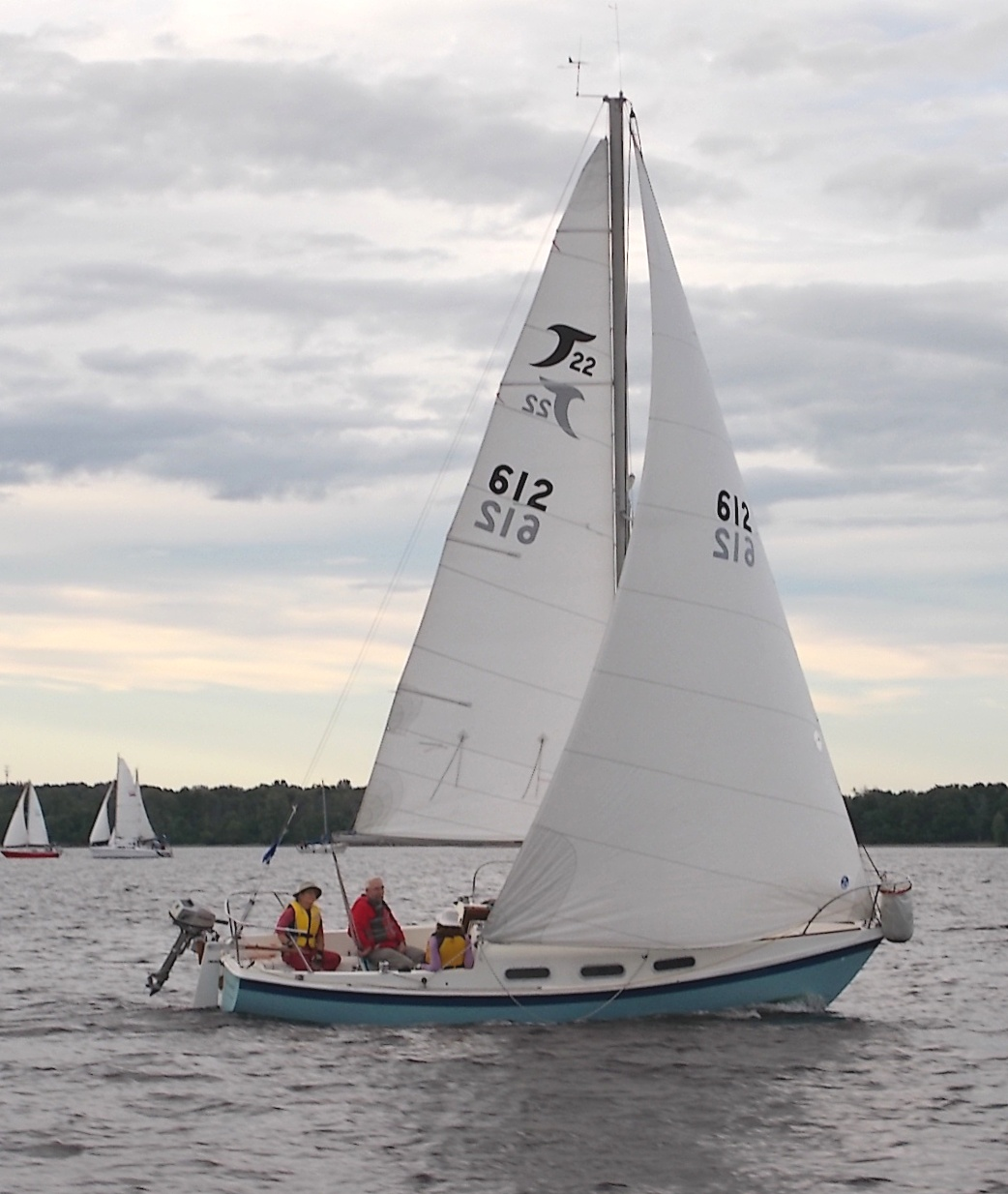
The Tanzer 22 is Johann Tanzer's most successful design, with 2,271 produced between 1970-1986

Tanzer immigrated to Canada in 1956, with a portfolio of sailboat designs that he hoped to put into production. He first worked in the aerospace industry, but quickly decided to pursue boat-building instead.

Tanzer is noted as the designer of several commercially successful sailboat designs, the most produced of which is the Tanzer 22, with 2,271 built between 1970-1986.

His company, located in Dorion, Quebec and with satellite manufacturing operations on both American coasts, became one of the largest boat builders in Canada during its 20 years in business, before it was forced into bankruptcy in 1986.

== Personal life ==
Tanzer was married to Gabriella, who died in 2012. They had three children, two grandchildren and one great grandchild.

== Death ==
Tanzer died on 23 October 2016 at age 89 at the Lakeshore General Hospital, in the Montreal suburb of Pointe-Claire.

== Boat designs ==
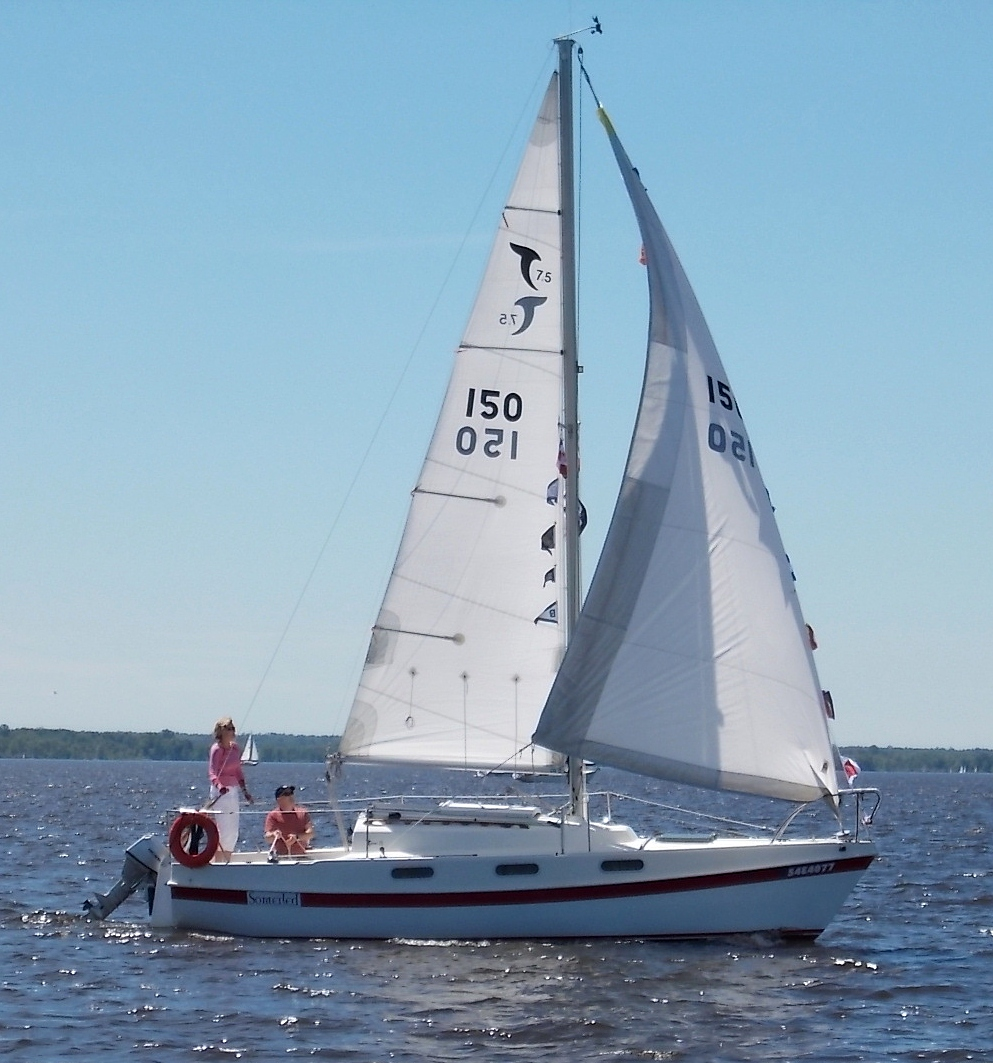
Johann Tanzer designed the Tanzer 7.5 sailboat

Tanzer's designs include:

- Constellation 16
- Overnighter 16
- Tanzer 7.5
- Tanzer 8.5
- Tanzer 10.5
- Tanzer 14
- Tanzer 16
- Tanzer 22
- Tanzer 26
- Tanzer 28
