= Tanzer 28 =

1970s Canadian recreational keelboat

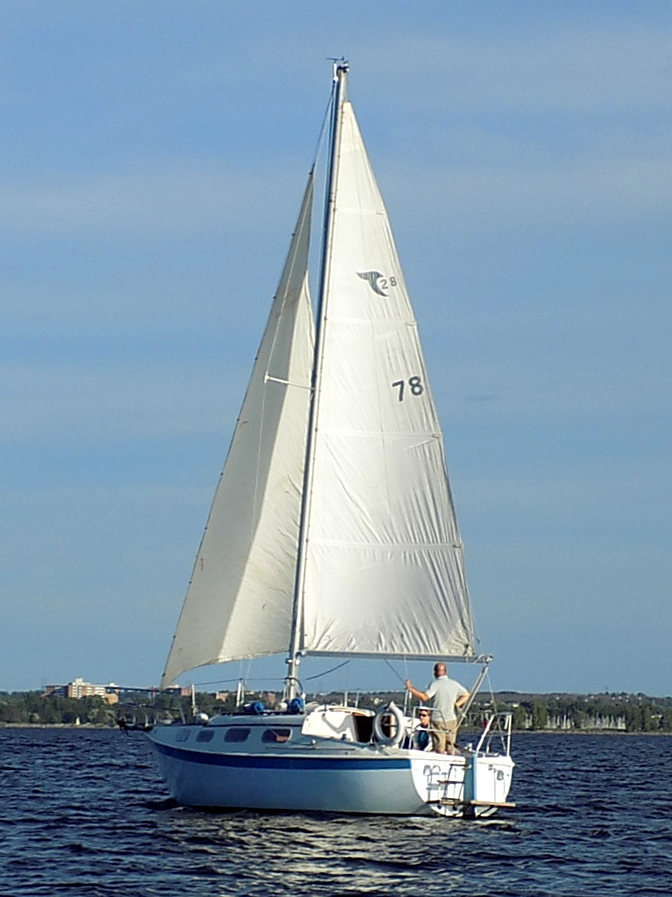

Development
- Designer: Johann Tanzer
- Location: Canada
- Year: 1972
- Builder: Tanzer Industries
- Name: Tanzer 28

Boat
- Crew: Two
- Draft: 4.08 ft (1.24 m)

Hull
- Type: Masthead sloop
- Construction: Fibreglass
- LOA: 27.58 ft (8.41 m)
- LWL: 23.50 ft (7.16 m)
- Beam: 9.82 ft (2.99 m)

Hull appendages
- Keel: fixed fin keel

Rig
- Mast height: 38.0 ft (11.6 m)

Sails
- Mainsail area: 140.00 sq ft (13.006 m^{2})
- Jib/genoa area: 216.38 sq ft (20.102 m^{2})
- Total sail area: 356.38 sq ft (33.109 m^{2})

Racing
- PHRF: 204 (average)

The Tanzer 28 is a recreational keelboat built by Tanzer Industries of Dorion, Quebec from 1972 to 1986. It has a masthead sloop rig. Its design gave it a large cabin interior for its size.

== Design ==
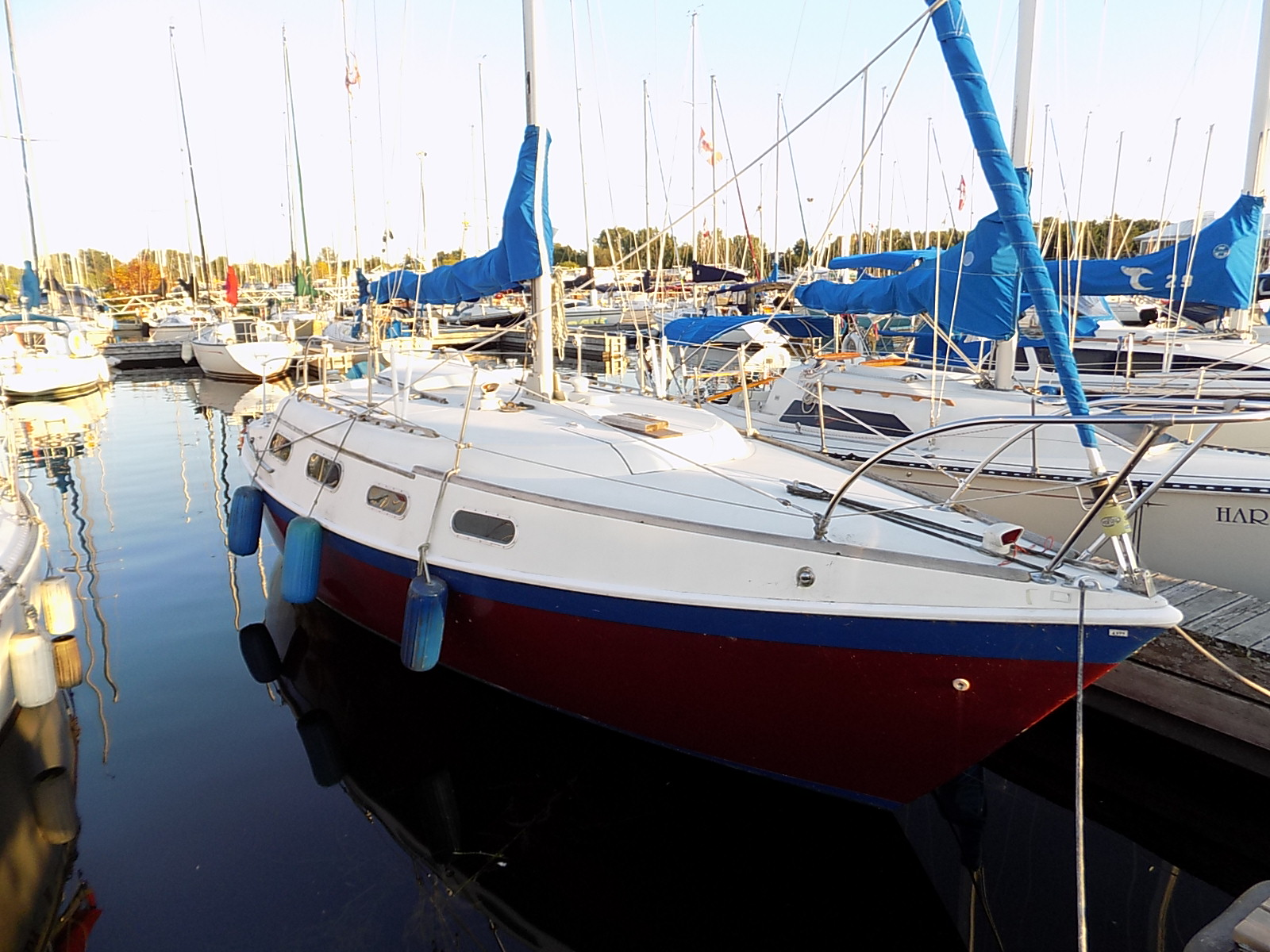
Tanzer 28

Designed by Johann Tanzer, the fibreglass hull has a transom-hung rudder and a fixed fin keel. It displaces 6,500 lb (2,948 kg) and carries 2,400 lb (1,089 kg) of ballast.

The boat has a PHRF racing average handicap of 204, with a low of 216 and a high of 192. It has a hull speed of 6.5 kn (12.04 km/h).
