= Wirth Munroe =

American architect

Wirth Middleton Munroe (November 29, 1902 – October 21, 1968) was a North American yacht designer and son of Ralph Middleton Munroe.

Munroe was born at the Barnacle, now the Barnacle Historic State Park. In 1933 he married Mary Kimball Poore of Coral Gables and they had two children (William Middleton Munroe and Charles Poore Munroe). He was Commodore of the Biscayne Bay Yacht Club 1946–1947, a member of the North American Yacht Racing Union (NAYRU) 1936–1966, and the Cruising Club of America as well as Vice-Commodore of the Miami Proa Club. He was a member of the Board of Directors of the Historical Association of Southern Florida (HASF) 1943–1966, and served as President of HASF in 1945.

== Boat Designing ==
Wirth Munroe began designing boats at an early age. Some of his designs, for example the Sea Sailer class were put into mass production. Below is a list of some of the many boats he designed with the earliest known boat name and earliest known owner indicated.

== Production boats ==
- Arco 33
- Columbia 33 Caribbean
- Columbia 34

== Sea Sailer 30' Boats ==
Boat name	Alternative Name/s	Official Number	Earliest Known Owner	Builder/s	Where Built	Launch Date
Beadacious	Blue Moon			Robin Fung	Hong Kong, B.C.C.	
Blue Moon				Robin Fung	Hong Kong, B.C.C.	
Encore				Robin Fung	Hong Kong, B.C.C.	
Fortune Cookie	Puffin Three, B.C.C.			Robin Fung	Hong Kong, B.C.C.	
KYP	KIP, North Star			Robin Fung	Hong Kong, B.C.C.	

== OffShore 30 Boats ==
Boat name	Alternative Name/s	Official Number	Earliest Known Owner	Builder/s	Where Built	Launch Date
Maroa		202	Joseph Racicot	Robin Fung	Hong Kong, B.C.C	1964
Vellela			Wirth M. Munroe	Robin Fung	Hong Kong, B.C.C.	1964

== Other Boats Designed by Wirth Munroe ==
Boat name	Alternative Name/s)	Official Number	Earliest Known Owner	Builder/s	Where Built	Launch	Length
Baloo	Bravo (1973)	508466	R.B. Bobo	Arco, Inc.	Miami	1959	33'
Blue Stream III	Decision III (1960), Aquarius		Dr. John T.MacDonald, M.Jack Rinehart, Sr.	Richard Richard	Miami	1948	39'11"
Bonnie Doon			Blanche ME Whitlock	Glassco, Inc.	Miami	1960	33'1"
Cheeta		295309	Robery P Brake	Dooley Glander	Perrine, FL	1964	33'
Chere		128158	Peter C. Keenan & Richard Walters	Crystalliner S.E. Corp	Miami Beach	1959	33-
Comanche			Jack Price	Warren Bailey	Miami	1956	39'6"
Daisy							30'
Delphinus		505797	Rear Admiral Robert J. Archer	Robin Fung, Ltd.	Hong Kong, B.C.C.	1966	29'10"
Gaviota				Consolidated			65'
Gaviota II	My Destiny (1960), Mogu		John William Shillain	Symonette Shipyard	Nassau, Bahamas	1939	59'
Island Belle	Virginia Bell, Rebel	242440		Gingras Boat Works	Cocoa, FL	1942	60'
Jesting				Glass Marine Ind. Inc.	Costa Mesa, CA	1964	33'1"
Ketch A Rainbow	Mary B., Rainbow (1973)		Carlos A. Capriles	Miami S.B. Corp.	Miami	1957	46'
Laughing Gull			Samuel A. Gayley	Wirth M. Munroe	Miami	1933	27'6"
Patience			Scott Rosen				
Pirouette			Ralph Ryder, McKenna(?) of Philadelphia				
Romany		276271	Andrew J. Lavoie	Miami S.B. Corp.	Miami	1958	46'
Sanctuary						1966	
Sea Itch	Fantail, Holiday		Richardson	Columbia			33'1"
Sprite			H.M.Sinclair	Wirth Munroe		1959	27'6"
Starlight		281400	Robert E. Russell	Glassco, Inc	Miami	1960	33'1"
Surprise			Gene Steffens	Bast Boat Builders	Okinawa	1960	
Tabasco			John W. Nixon	Glassco, Inc.	Miami Beach	1959	
Tern			Benjamin W. Guy, II	Glassco, Inc.	Miami	1960	33'1"
The Golden Fleece			Douglas & Martha Sager	Glassco, Inc.	Miami	1960	33'1"
Tobi			Wirth Munroe and Townsend Ludington	Wirth Munroe	Coconut Grove, FL	1937	25'
Tonga			Errol Flynn				75'
Tranquility	Southwind (1973)		Carleton H. Endemann	Robin Fung Ltd.	Hong Kong, B.C.C.	1969	29'10"
Traveler			Arthur W. Crimmins	Arthur W. Crimmins	Miami	1950	29'11"
Tropical Disturbance				Wirth Munroe, Walter Croft, Sr. & Robert Lewis			
Vincere			J. Afred Grow, Jr.	Arthur W. Crimmins		1959	33'1"
Un-Named			Carrington Gramling (Attorney)				

The Barnacle Historic State Park
