= Cat-ketch =

Sailboat rigged as both a catboat and a ketch

A cat-ketch is a sailboat that is rigged as both a catboat and a ketch. Specifically, there is larger mast stepped at the very bow, and a smaller mast further aft. It is different from a standard ketch rig because there is no jib, and the foremost mast is further forward than most ketches. This rig is found on amongst others Norwalk Island Sharpies, Sea Pearl 21, Freedom Yachts and Wyliecats.

There are several traditional types of Cat Ketch Workboats including Mackinaw Boats of the Upper Great Lakes, through to the Cat Ketch Coquina, a design by the great Nathaniel Herreshoff for his own use.
