= Traddles =

Traddles may refer to:

- Tommy Traddles, a fictional character in the 1850 Charles Dickens novel David Copperfield and its 1969 film adaptation; see David Copperfield (novel), David Copperfield (1969 film), and List of Dickensian characters
- USS Tommy Traddles (1906), a United States Navy patrol boat acquired in 1917 but never commissioned
