= Ketch =

Sailboat with a two-masted rig

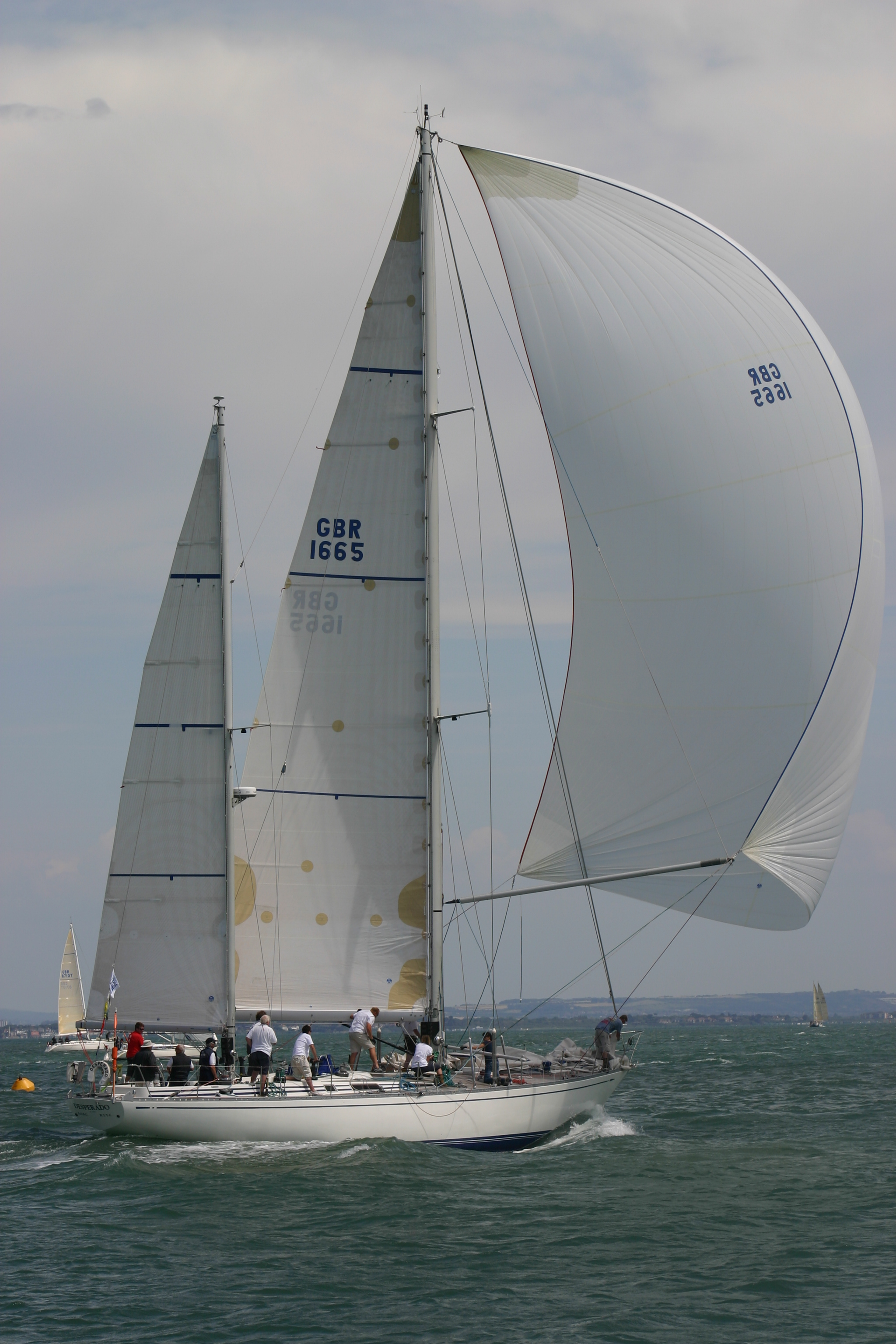
Swan 65 ketch flying a spinnaker

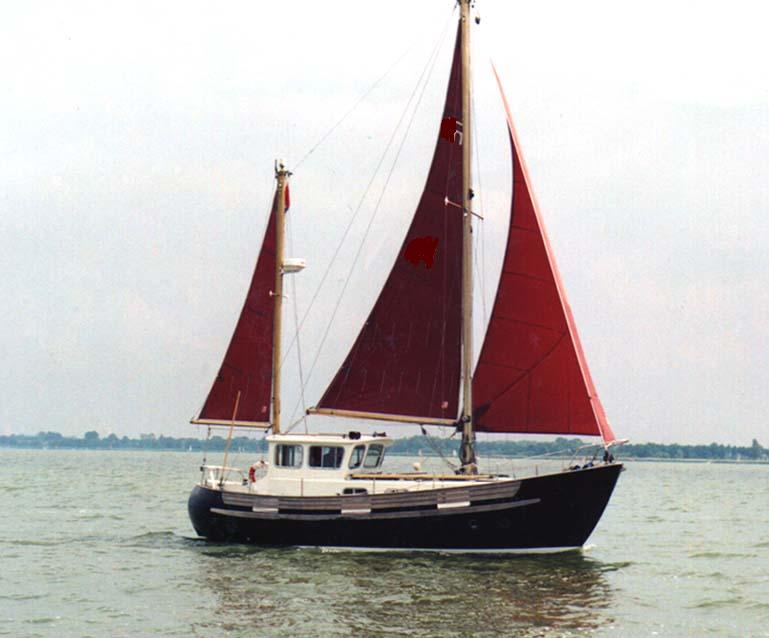
Fisher30 motorsailer ketch

A ketch is a two-masted sailboat whose mainmast is taller than the mizzen mast (or after-mast), and whose mizzen mast is stepped forward of the rudder post. The mizzen mast being stepped forward of the rudder post is what distinguishes the ketch from a yawl, which has its mizzen mast stepped aft of its rudder post. In the 19th and 20th centuries, ketch rigs were often employed on larger yachts and working watercraft, but ketches are also used as smaller working watercraft as short as 15 feet, or as small cruising boats, such as Bill Hanna's Tahiti ketches or L. Francis Herreshoff's Rozinante and H-28.

== History ==
The name ketch is derived from catch. The ketch's main mast is usually stepped further forward than the position found on a sloop.

The sail plan of a ketch is similar to that of a yawl, on which the mizzen mast is smaller and set further back. There are versions of the ketch rig that only have a mainsail and a mizzen, in which case they are referred to as cat ketch. More commonly ketches have headsails (jibs). When a ketch is rigged so that it can fly multiple jibs at the same time, the rig is sometimes referred to as a multi-headsail ketch. While sometimes seen in print, it is incorrect to refer to this rig by the modern malaprop of cutter ketch.

In New England in the 1600s, the ketch was a small coastal working watercraft. In the 1700s, it disappeared from contemporary records, apparently replaced by the schooner. The ketch rig remained popular in America throughout the 19th and early 20th century working watercraft, with well-known examples being the Chesapeake Bay bugeyes, New Haven sharpies, and the Kingston Lobster boats. In Europe, during this same period many of the canoe yawls were technically ketches since their mizzen masts were located forward of the rudder posts. The cat ketch rig experienced a brief period of renewed interest in the 1970s and 1980s as carbon fiber spars made free-standing mast versions of this rig possible for cruising boats under 40 feet.

Staysails can also be hoisted between the top of the mizzen mast and base of the mainmast to help downwind performance.
