= Peacock Park =

Public urban park in Miami, Florida

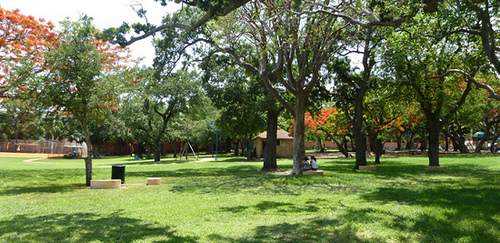
- Peacock Park
- Interactive map of Peacock Park
- Type: Municipal
- Location: Coconut Grove, Miami, Florida, United States
- Coordinates: 25.725°N 80.240°W
- Area: 9.4 acres (38,000 m^{2})
- Created: 1934
- Operator: City of Miami

Peacock Park is a 9.4-acre (3.8 ha) public, urban park where Indian peacocks roam in the Coconut Grove neighborhood of Miami, Florida on the shore of Biscayne Bay.

== History ==
Among the first permanent settlers in South Florida were grocers Charles and Isabella Peacock who arrived in Coconut Grove encouraged to establish a hotel. Their hotel, built in 1883, was called Bay View House and was the first hotel on mainland Florida south of Palm Beach. Later renamed the Peacock Inn, it was where the first community gatherings in Miami were held. Some visitors to the inn stayed in the area and this was the beginning of Coconut Grove, South Florida's first mainland community. Closing in 1902, the Peacock Inn building became the Lake Placid School until the school moved to Pompano Beach in 1925 The building was torn down in 1926. Later the property became a city park. After the hotel closed in 1902 Ralph Munroe established Camp Biscayne nearby so there would be a place for visitors to stay.

The city of Miami purchased the private property in 1934 for $63,500 ($1,125,150 in 2015 U.S. dollars) and established it as the public Coconut Grove Bayfront Park, renamed in honor of the aforementioned Peacocks in 1973. Considered the Miami equivalent of the Greenwich Village neighborhood of New York, during the 1960s the park and surrounding Coconut Grove area became notable as a center for hippies and the youth counterculture, hosting several be-ins and concerts during the latter part of the decade. Nearby Dinner Key hosted a now-infamous Doors concert where lead singer Jim Morrison allegedly exposed himself in 1969.

Park amenities include a baseball field, basketball court, tennis court, playground, peacock aviary, and skatepark. The adjacent Kenneth M. Myers Park, which hosts the Coconut Grove Sailing Club, is jointly administered by the city with Peacock Park. The Dinner Key Marina complex is located immediately along the shore of the park.

== Gallery ==
The Peacock Inn, c. 1880s

The Inn, as it appeared c. 1896

== Bibliography ==
- Frank J. Cavaioli. Pompano Beach: A History Charleston, SC: The History Press, 2007.
- "City of Miami website". Archived from the original on 20 July 2011.
- Junior League of Miami. Historic Coconut Grove. 1987.
- Arva Moore Parks. The Forgotten Frontier. Miami: Banyan Books, 1980.
