= Camp Biscayne =

Former resort camp in Florida

Coordinates: 25.7251°N 80.2411°W

Camp Biscayne was a winter resort founded in 1903 by Ralph Middleton Munroe to provide "a stopping place in Coconut Grove, Florida", as the Peacock Inn had closed in 1902. Situated a few lots south of the Barnacle (now the Barnacle Historic State Park), Camp Biscayne primarily catered to those interested in sailing, fishing, and the simple life. By 1925, when the resort closed, it consisted of several cottages and a main lodge with a dining room that could seat 100 people. At Camp Biscayne, Munroe made efforts to preserve as much of the hammock (tropical forest) as possible, believing it had "worked out its life's problems and established itself as the legitimate occupant of the land." Drawing inspiration from the trees in the hammock, Munroe named each of the 11 cottages after a native tree or an ornamental one. Each tree was tagged, and a list of the trees was made available to guests.
