= Kirk Munroe =

American novelist (1850–1930)

- Born: September 15, 1850; Prairie du Chien, Wisconsin, U.S.
- Died: June 16, 1930 (aged 79); Orlando, Florida, U.S.
- Occupation: Writer
- Spouses: Mary Barr Munroe (m. 1883; died 1922) Mabel Stearns (m. 1924)
- Writing career
- Period: 1876 to 1905
- Genre: Children's novels

Kirk Munroe (September 15, 1850 – June 16, 1930) was an American writer and conservationist.

== Biography ==
Born Charles Kirk Munroe in a log cabin near Prairie du Chien, Wisconsin, Munroe was the son of Charles and Susan (Hall) Munroe. His youth was spent on the frontier, after which his family moved to Cambridge, Massachusetts, where he attended school until he was sixteen. He publicly dropped "Charles" from his name in 1883.

In 1876, Kirk Munroe was hired as a reporter for the New York Sun. Three years later he became the first editor of Harper's Young People magazine; he resigned in 1881. From 1879 to 1884, he was the commodore of New York Canoe club. During this time he helped found the League of American Wheelmen with Charles E. Pratt on May 31, 1880. Munroe was the Wheelmen's first Commander.

He married Mary Barr, daughter of Amelia E. Barr on September 15, 1883. The couple settled in Coconut Grove, Miami, Florida, in 1886. Mary accompanied him on several cruises on the Allapata, a 35-foot sharpie-ketch sailboat designed by Ralph Middleton Munroe. While in Florida, Munroe became a noted member of the Florida Audubon Society, and recommended a family friend Guy Bradley to the position as game warden in southern Florida. Bradley was later killed by plume hunters while on duty in the Everglades. Munroe built a tennis court on his property. It was the first tennis court in Miami-Dade county. Munroe helped establish what is today called Ransom Everglades School.

After Mary died in September 1922, he married his second wife, Mabel Stearns, in 1924. Kirk Munroe died in Orlando, Florida, on June 16, 1930, at the age of 79. He was buried next to his first wife, Mary, at Woodlawn Park Cemetery in Miami.

== Legacy ==
The city of Miami's only tennis park is named Kirk Munroe Park and is located at 3101 Florida Avenue in Coconut Grove. The Library of Congress holds the papers of Kirk Munroe.

== Bibliography ==
- Wakulla (1886)
- The Flamingo Feather (1887)
- Derrick Sterling (1888)
- Chrystal Jack & Co and Delta Bixby (1889)
- The Golden Days of '49 (1889)
- Dorymates (1890)
- Under Orders (1890)
- Prince Dusty (1891)
- Campmates (1891)
- Canoemates (1892)
- Cab and Caboose (1892)
- Raftmates (1893)
- The White Conquerors of Mexico (1894)
- The Coral Ship (1893)
- The Fur-Seal's Tooth (1894)
- Big Cypress (1894)
- Snow Shoes and Sledges (1895)
- At War with Pontiac (1895)
- Rick Dale (1896)
- Through Swamp and Glade (1896)
- The Painted Desert (1897)
- With Crockett and Bowie (1897)
- Ready Rangers (1897)
- The Copper Princess (1898)
- In Pirate Waters (1898)
- Shine Terrill (1899)
- Forward March (1899)
- Midshipman Stuart (1899)
- Brethren of the Coast (1900)
- Under the Great Bear (1900)
- The Belt of Seven Totems (1901)
- A Son of Satsuma (1901)
- The Blue Dragon (1905)
- For the Mikado, or A Japanese Middy in Action (1905)
