= Columbia 33 Caribbean =

Sailboat class

Development
- Designer: Wirth Munroe
- Location: United States
- Year: 1963
- No. built: 61
- Builder: Columbia Yachts
- Name: Columbia 33 Caribbean

Boat
- Displacement: 11,000 lb (4,990 kg)
- Draft: 7.00 ft (2.13 m) with centerboard down

Hull
- Type: Monohull
- Construction: Fiberglass
- LOA: 33.08 ft (10.08 m)
- LWL: 24.00 ft (7.32 m)
- Beam: 9.83 ft (3.00 m)
- Engine: Universal Atomic 4 30 hp (22 kW) gasoline engine

Hull appendages
- Keel: long keel with centerboard
- Ballast: 4,200 lb (1,905 kg)
- Rudder: keel-mounted rudder

Rig
- Rig type: Bermuda rig
- I foretriangle height: 40.50 ft (12.34 m)
- J foretriangle base: 13.50 ft (4.11 m)
- P mainsail luff: 35.00 ft (10.67 m)
- E mainsail foot: 15.50 ft (4.72 m)

Sails
- Sailplan: Masthead sloop
- Mainsail area: 271.25 sq ft (25.200 m^{2})
- Jib/genoa area: 273.38 sq ft (25.398 m^{2})
- Total sail area: 544.63 sq ft (50.598 m^{2})

The Columbia 33 Caribbean is an American sailboat that was designed by Wirth Munroe as deep water cruiser and first built in 1963.

The Columbia 33 Caribbean is a development of the Arco 33, which was built by Crystaliner, who completed 15 examples in 1959, before selling the molds to Columbia Yachts.

The Columbia 33 Caribbean design was developed into the Columbia 34 in 1966 with the addition of a new deck adapted from the Columbia 40 design.

== Production ==
The Columbia 33 Caribbean design was built by Columbia Yachts, who built 61 examples between 1963 and 1965, but it is now out of production.

== Design ==
The Columbia 33 Caribbean is a recreational keelboat, built predominantly of fiberglass, with wood trim. It has a masthead sloop rig, a spooned raked stem, a raised counter transom, a keel-mounted rudder controlled by a tiller and a fixed long keel with a retractable centerboard. It displaces 11,000 lb (4,990 kg) and carries 4,200 lb (1,905 kg) of ballast.

The boat has a draft of 7.00 ft (2.13 m) with the centreboard extended and 3.50 ft (1.07 m) with it retracted. The boat is fitted with a Universal Atomic 4 30 hp (22 kW) gasoline engine for docking and maneuvering.

The design has a hull speed of 6.57 kn (12.17 km/h).

== See also ==
- List of sailing boat types

Related development

- Columbia 34

Similar sailboats

- Abbott 33
- C&C 33
- CS 33
- Endeavour 33
- Hunter 33
- Hunter 33.5
- Mirage 33
- Nonsuch 33
- Tanzer 10
- Viking 33
- Watkins 33
