= Mary Barr Munroe =

American clubwoman (1852–1922)

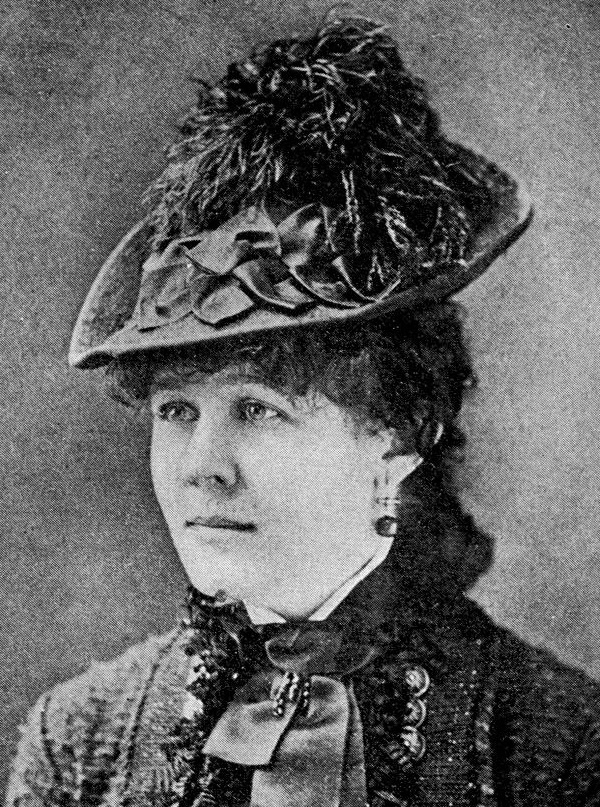
- Born: January 5, 1852; Glasgow, Scotland
- Died: September 8, 1922 (aged 70); Cocoanut Grove, Florida, USA

Mary Barr Munroe (January 5, 1852 – September 8, 1922) was a Scottish-born American clubwoman and conservationist, based in Miami, Florida. Munroe founded the Coconut Grove Audubon Society and library, and worked for the establishment of a state park that became part of the Everglades National Park.

== Early life ==
Mary Barr was born in Glasgow, the daughter of Robert Barr and Amelia Edith Huddleston Barr. Her mother was a prolific novelist and teacher, born in Lancashire; her father was a wool merchant. She moved to the United States as a baby, and spent her girlhood in Chicago, in Texas, (where her father and brothers died from yellow fever), and in New York.

== Career ==
Munroe moved to Florida with her husband in 1886, becoming one of the "pioneers" of the Coconut Grove neighborhood of Miami. She was the first elected president of the Woman's Club of Coconut Grove, started the Dade County Federation of Women's Clubs, was active in the Florida Federation of Women's Clubs. She founded the Coconut Grove Audubon Society and was its first president in 1915. She opposed the fashion of using egret feathers in women's hats, and was known to forcibly remove them from hats of other women in her company. She started a boys' club, Bird Defenders, to encourage children to protect Florida birds. She began the book collection that became the Coconut Grove Library in 1895. With Edith Gifford and May Mann Jennings, she proposed the establishment of Royal Palms State Park, which was dedicated in 1916 and became part of the Everglades National Park in 1947.

Munroe wrote about Florida for several national publications, and was the author of Florida Birds are Worth Their Weight in Gold, a pamphlet of the Florida Audubon Society. She corresponded with John Muir. She started an interracial sewing club, and attended services at a nearby black church.

== Personal life ==
Mary Barr married American writer Kirk Munroe (1850–1930) in 1883. She died in 1922, aged 70 years, at "Scrububs", her home in Coconut Grove, Florida. Her grave is in Miami's Caballero Rivero Woodlawn Park cemetery. Her diaries are in the Kirk Munroe Papers at the Library of Congress. The Mary Barr Munroe Society is a women's organization that raises funds for programs benefiting women and girls in Coconut Grove. Munroe's sponge cake recipe was so prized that, a century later, it is still promoted by the Munroe Society at baking events.
