= Amelia Edith Huddleston Barr =

English novelist and teacher (1831–1919)

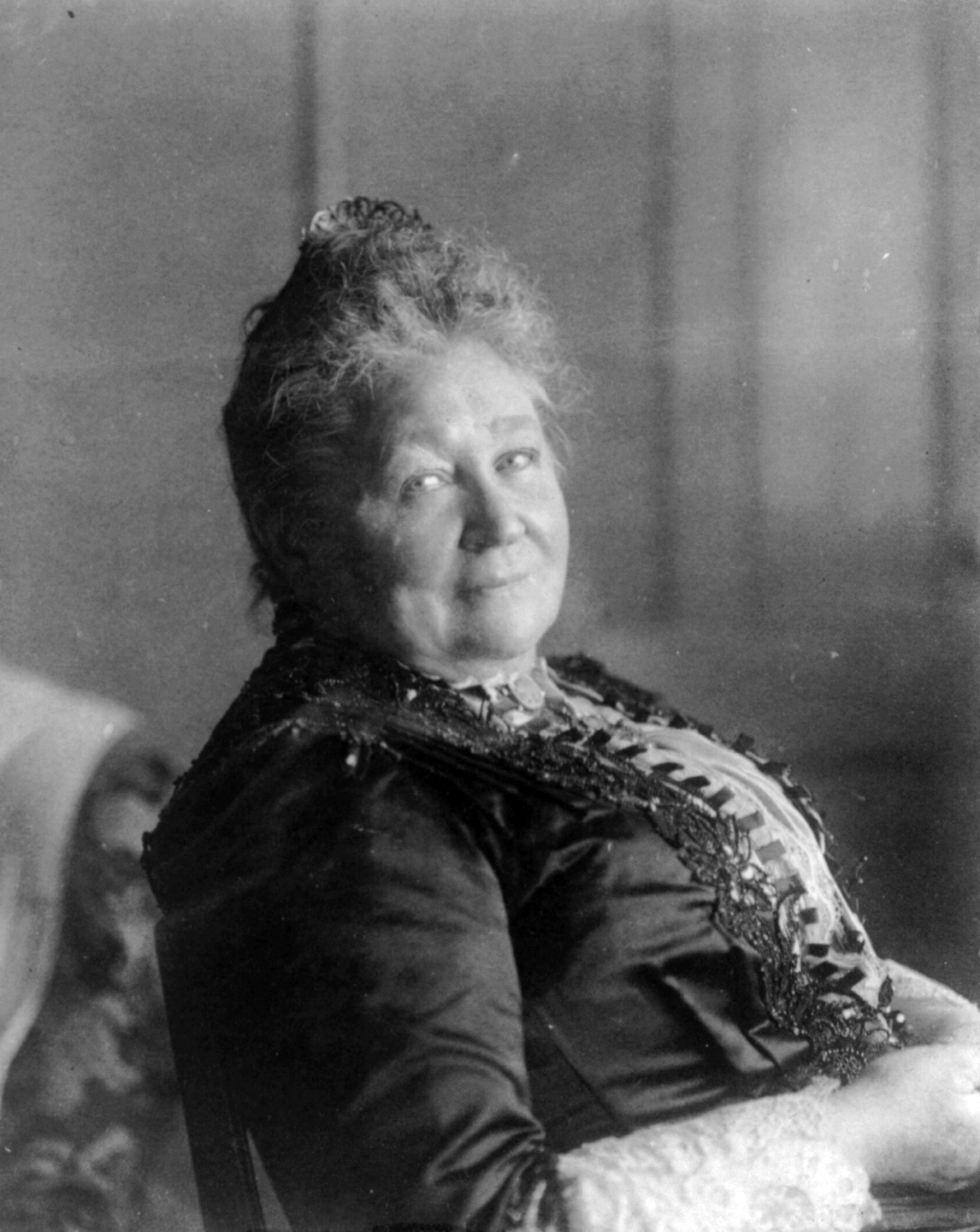
- Barr in 1903
- Born: Amelia Edith Huddleston; March 29, 1831; Ulverston, Lancashire, England
- Died: March 10, 1919 (aged 87); Richmond Hill, Queens, New York, US
- Resting place: Sleepy Hollow Cemetery, Tarrytown, New York, US
- Education: Normal School in Glasgow, Scotland
- Occupations: novelist, teacher
- Spouse: William Barr (m. 1850–1867) his death
- Relatives: William Huddleston (father); Mary Barr Munroe (daughter); Kirk Munroe (son-in-law)
- Writing career
- Language: English

Amelia Edith Huddleston Barr (March 29, 1831 – March 10, 1919) was an English novelist and teacher. Many of the plots of her stories are laid in Scotland and England. The scenes are from her girlhood recollection of surroundings. Her works include, Jan Vedder's Wife, A Border Shepherdess, Feet of Clay, Friend Olivia, The Bow of Orange Ribbon, Remember the Alamo, She Loved a Sailor, A Daughter of Fife, The Squire of Sanddal Side, Paul and Christina, Master of His Fate, The Household of McNeil, The Last of the Macallisters, Between Two Loves, A Sister to Esau, A Rose of a Hundred Leaves, A Singer from the Sea, The Beads of Tasmer, The Hallam Succession, The Lone House, Christopher and Other Stories, The Lost Silver of Briffault.

== Early years and education ==
She was born on March 29, 1831 (1832 is also reported), in Ulverston, Lancashire, England, as Amelia Edith Huddleston. Her father was Reverend William Huddleston, a Wesleyan minister. She was brought up in an atmosphere of culture and refinement, and early turned to books for recreation and instruction. When only nine years of age she became her father's companion and reader. Thus it was she read books far beyond her comprehension, but they tended to develop her mental qualities. A brief return to her father's financial stability allowed Barr to return to the Normal School in Glasgow where she learned the Stowe teaching method. Its principles are based on morality and lifelong learning, rather than learning by rote.

== Career ==
On 11 July 1850, she and a prosperous local wool merchant, Robert Barr, married. The couple emigrated to the U.S. in September 1853, landing in New York City. In Chicago, Illinois, Barr tutored at home, and established a school for girls, though she was not involved for long as her husband's business prospects fell through and they traveled west, settled in Austin, Texas. They remained there until after the American Civil War when they moved to Galveston, where Mr. Barr became an auditor for the state, before he and four sons were stricken with yellow fever and died. Of their 12 children, several died young.

With her three remaining daughters, Mrs. Barr moved to Ridgewood, New Jersey, in 1868. She came there to tutor the three sons of a prominent citizen, William Libby, in ancient and modern literature, music, and drawing; and opened a school in a small house. This structure still stands at the southwest corner of Van Dien and Linwood Avenues. Barr did not like Ridgewood and did not remain there for very long. She left shortly after selling a story to a magazine.

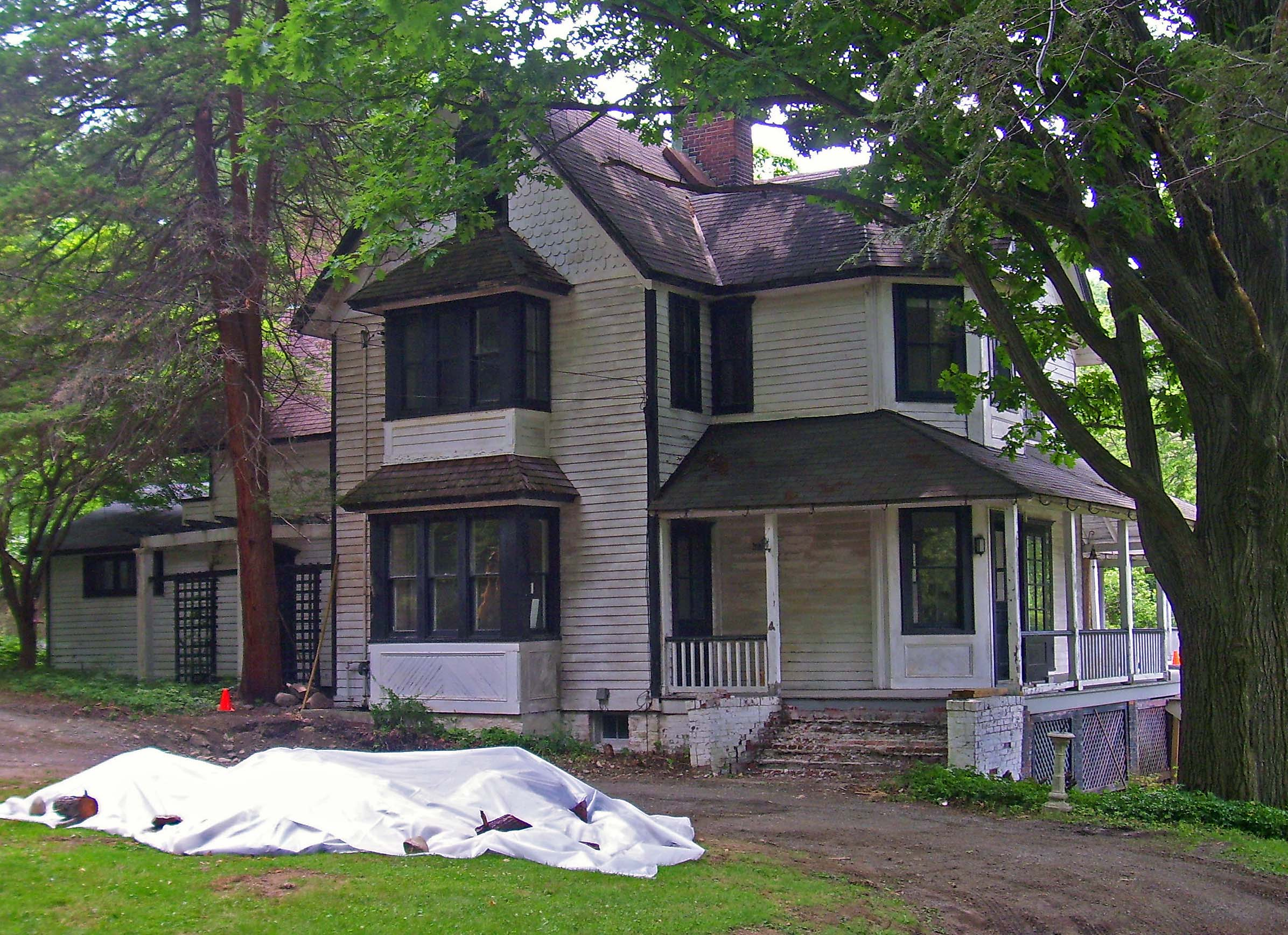
Amelia Barr house, Orange County, New York

Barr asked advice of Henry Ward Beecher, then editor of the Christian Union, in regard to contributions to magazines. He encouraged her to write for his paper. Through the Bouchers or Dr. Lyman Abbott, she met the Harpers and wrote for them many years. After an accident confined her to a chair, unable to employ herself otherwise, she wrote her first novel, Jan Vedder's Wife. Thereafter, she wrote a great deal. In 1869, she moved to New York City, where she began to write for religious periodicals and to publish a series of semi-historical tales and novels. By 1891, when she achieved greater success, she and her daughters moved up the Hudson River to Cornwall-on-Hudson, New York, where they renovated a house on the slopes of Storm King Mountain and named it Cherry Croft. The name has been applied to that period of her career, the most productive and successful. She remained there until moving in with her daughter Lilly in White Plains in her last years.

Barr had a sunstroke in July 1918 and never fully recovered. She died on March 10, 1919, in Richmond Hill, Queens, New York, where she had moved in 1914. She was buried in Sleepy Hollow Cemetery in Tarrytown, New York, near her friend, Louis Klopsch. Her daughter Mary Barr Munroe became a noted clubwoman and conservationist in Florida.

== Selected works ==
=== Novels ===
- Romance and Reality (1872)
- Jan Vedder's Wife (1885)
- A Daughter of Fife (1886)
- A Bow of Orange Ribbon (1886)
- A Border Shepherdess (1887)
- Paul and Christina (1887)
- Remember the Alamo (1888)
- Between Two Loves (1889)
- She Loved a Sailor (1890)
- Friend Olivia (1891)
- A Rose of a Hundred Leaves (1891)
- The Bow of Orange Ribbon (1893)
- A Singer from the Sea (1893)
- Birds of a Feather (1893)
- The Lone House (1894)
- Bernicia (1895)
- A Knight of the Nets (1896)
- Trinity Bells (1899)
- The Maid of Maiden Lane (1900)
- Souls of Passage (1901)
- The Lion's Whelp (1901)
- Thyra Varrick (1903)
- The Black Shilling (1903)
- Cecilia's Lovers (1906)
- The Man Between (1906)
- The Belle of Bowling Green (1908)
- The Strawberry Handkerchief (1908)
- The Hands of Compulsion (1909)
- The House of Cherry Street (1909)
- A Reconstructed Marriage (1910)
- Sheila Vedder (1911)
- The Measure of a Man (1915)

=== Autobiography ===
- All the Days of my Life (1913)
