= Ralph Munroe =

American yacht designer (1851–1933)

Ralph M. Munroe
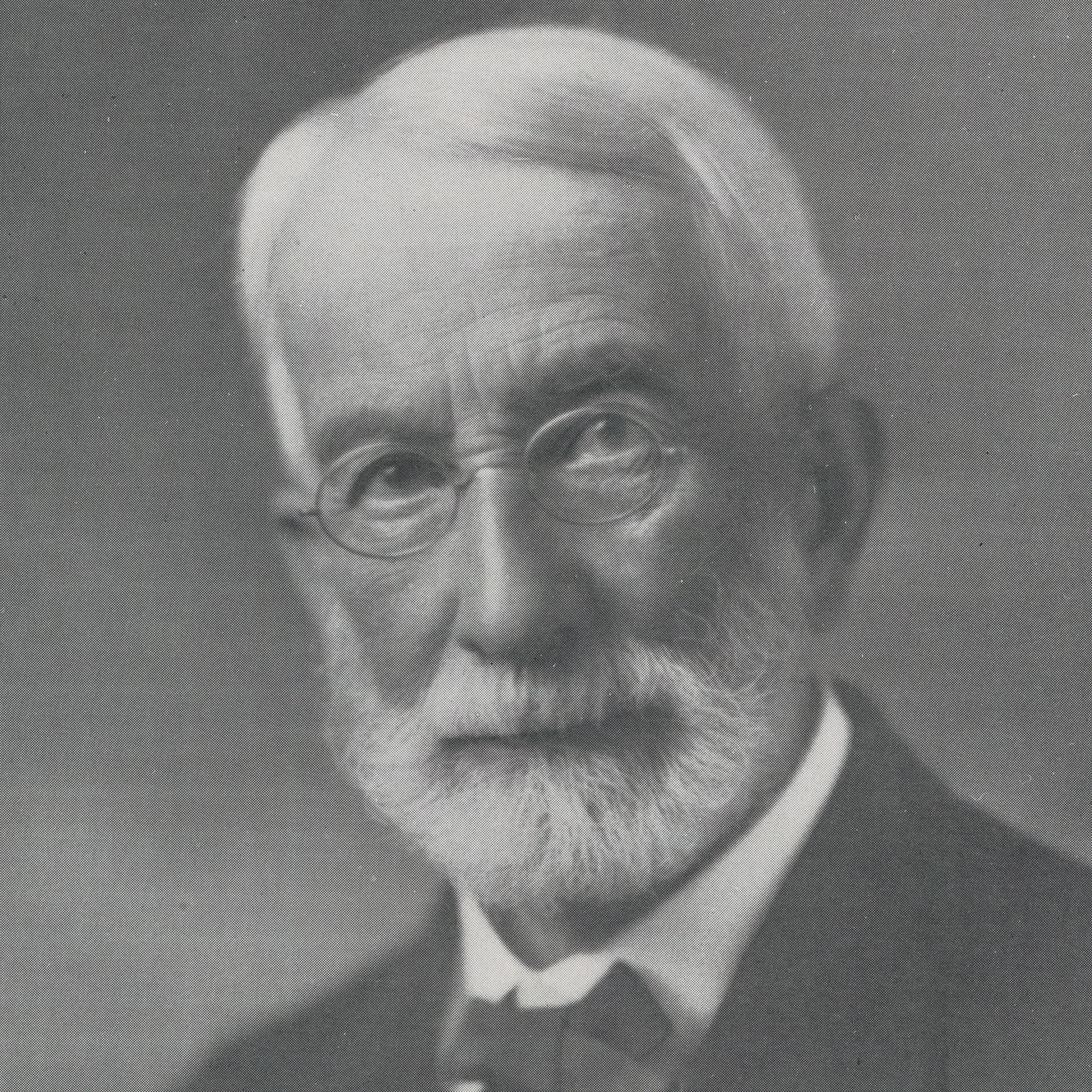
- Munroe in 1926
- Born: April 3, 1851; New York City, US
- Died: August 20, 1933 (aged 82); Coconut Grove, Florida, US
- Occupation: Yacht designer

Ralph Middleton Munroe (April 3, 1851 – August 20, 1933) was an American yacht designer and early resident of Coconut Grove in South Florida. His home, now The Barnacle Historic State Park, is the oldest house in Miami-Dade County still standing in its original location.

== Early life ==
Munroe was born to Thomas and Ellen Middleton Munroe at their family home on 22nd Street near 4th Avenue in New York City on April 3, 1851. Munroe's grandfather was William Munroe who made the first American lead pencils in 1812. In 1854, the Munroe family moved to Clifton, Staten Island, where Munroe spent his childhood. He lived in a large home at 104 Townsend Avenue. Growing up near the sea, he became fascinated with the boats that were essential to island life. The New York Yacht Club America's Cup Race was held near his childhood home in Clifton. While a student at Eagleswood Military Academy, near Perth Amboy, New Jersey, from 1861 to 1864, he purchased the Hornet for $2.00, the first of many boats he owned.

After briefly attending Columbia University in New York City, Munroe participated in a number of lucrative business ventures as well as yachting adventures. In 1874, he encountered William Brickell off of the coast of Staten Island, a meeting that changed his life. It was from him that Munroe learned more of Biscayne Bay, which he visited for the first time in 1877.

At age 28, Munroe married Eva Amelia Hewitt in 1879 and established his permanent home at Great Kills, Staten Island Two years later, she gave birth to a daughter, Edith Munroe. The joy of his daughter's birth was met with tragedy. Within the next few months, Eva contracted tuberculosis and in the hopes of recovery, Munroe brought Eva; her sister, Adeline, also tubercular; and their brother to Biscayne Bay. His daughter Edith died in her grandmother's care shortly after their departure. Eva died in April 1882. She is buried on the grounds of the Coconut Grove Library. This is the oldest marked grave in Miami. A devastated Munroe soon returned to Staten Island.

== Move to Florida ==
Between 1882 and 1886, Munroe returned to Biscayne Bay several times, spending winters with Charles and Isabella Peacock, who were then building the Bay View House, Dade County's first hotel, later renamed the Peacock Inn. He returned to summer in Staten Island each year. In 1886, Munroe decided to make Coconut Grove his permanent home, and purchased the future site of The Barnacle Historic State Park, which was at the time 40 acres (160,000 m^{2}) of bayfront property. He paid $400 in cash in addition to one of his yachts, the Kingfish, which he valued at an additional $400. Two years later, in 1888, he sold his home in Staten Island to remain year round in Coconut Grove.

With his new home began a new life. Munroe built his boathouse directly on the bay in 1887 with living quarters on the upper floor and a workshop on the lower floor. He continued designing yachts, fifty-six of which he completed over the course of his lifetime. His most famous design was Egret, a 28 ft, double-ended sharpie lifeboat which he designed for himself. He obtained a wrecking license from the State of Florida to salvage ships on Biscayne Bay, which were numerous due to the surrounding reef and shallow waters.

After he had settled into his various careers, the always social Munroe founded the Biscayne Bay Yacht Club in 1887. He was the club's first Commodore, a position he held for twenty-two years.

Fully established in every regard but one, Munroe decided to start the construction of his house, "The Barnacle", in 1891. He met his second wife, Jessie Wirth, on a sailing trip in 1894, and they married a year later in 1895. Jessie gave birth to a daughter, Patty, (1900), and a son, Wirth, (1902) who also became a yacht designer. The family took frequent cruises on the bay and the children learned to sail at a very young age.

In 1903, he and his friend Tom Hine established a resort on the property called Camp Biscayne. Guests included Ruth Rowland Nichols, William Grigsby McCormick, and Alexander Graham Bell. Many who wintered at Camp Biscayne later settled in the area permanently as Munroe had.

Munroe's autobiography, The Commodore's Story, was published in 1930. Written with the assistance of Vincent Gilpin, it is one of the few first-hand accounts existing of pioneer days in Miami-Dade County.

Munroe was a very good friend of Captain Nat Herreshoff, an American naval architect. Herreshoff spent the last winters of his life residing at a cottage at the Barnacle.

Photography was another important aspect of Munroe's life. He was an accomplished amateur photographer. During his lifetime, many of his photographs were used in magazines, newspapers, and books as illustrations. Three illustrations in Willoughby's Across the Everglades are credited to Munroe. His photographs are the only record of what pioneer days looked like in early Miami. Many of these photographs were published in the book The Forgotten Frontier.

Munroe died on 20 August 1933 at age 82. He was buried in Sleepy Hollow Cemetery, Concord, Massachusetts. He was survived by his wife and two children who, with his other descendants, continued to occupy The Barnacle until 1973 when the family sold it to the state of Florida.

== Vessels designed ==
=== Proas ===
Proa	First owner	Builder	Where built	Launch date
Proa (1)	Biscayne Bay Yacht Club	Ralph Middleton Munroe	Coconut Grove	1898
Proa (2)	Biscayne Bay Yacht Club			1903
Proa (3)	Ransom Everglades High School			1903
Proa (4)	Anderson			1908

=== Yachts ===
Yacht	First owner	Builder	Where built	Launch date
ALICE	Henry Howard	A.C. Brown & Son	Tottenville, S.I., NY	1924
ALLAPATTA	Kirk Munroe	A.C. Brown & Son	Tottenville, S.I., NY	1888
Anemone (aka Domino)	Gilbert Haight	A.C. Brown & Son	Tottenville, S.I., NY	1882
Arlega	Archie B. Gardner	S.B. Gedney	Miami, FL	1914
Biscayne				
Buckeye	W.B.Shattuc	Ralph Middleton Munroe	Miami, NY	1905
CARIB	Arthur S. Haigh	Ralph Middleton Munroe	Coconut Grove, NY	1901
CARIB II (aka Billy II)	M. (Max) Mauran	A.C. Brown & Son	Tottenville, S.I., NY	1924
CERO	Henry Hovey	A.C. Brown & Son	Tottenville, S.I., NY	1899
CRESCENT	Pres. Crescent Bicycle Co. of Syracuse, NY	A.C. Brown & Son	Tottenville, S.I., NY	1899
Cyclone	E.B. Underhill	Ralph Middleton Munroe	New York, NY	1876
Dragon	H.L. Park	A.C. Brown & Son	Tottenville, S.I., NY	1907
E.B. Underhill	Ralph Middleton Munroe	Ralph Middleton Munroe	New York, NY	1872–1873
Egret	Ralph Middleton Munroe	A.C. Brown & Son	Tottenville, S.I., NY	1886
EVANGELINE	Bancroft C. Davis	Geo. Lawley & Son Corp.	Neponset, MA	1915
Florence W	Richard (Dick) Carney	Brown, W	--	1887
Fornella	Waters S. Davis	Ralph Middleton Munroe	Miami, FL	1903
Fornella II	Waters S. Davis	Peck & Bailey		1903
GRANATZA (aka Rita)	N.M. George	A.C. Brown & Son	Tottenville, S.I., NY	1902
HOLGAZANA	Walter H. Browne	A.C. Brown & Son	Tottenville, S.I., NY	1887
J.P. Musere	Ralph Middleton Munroe	A.C. Brown & Son	Tottenville, S.I., NY	1878?
Kingfish	Ralph Middleton Munroe	A.C. Brown & Son	Tottenville, S.I., NY	1883
KONA	F. Gray Griswold	Nilson Yacht Building Co.	Baltimore, MD	1909
Loon	W.J. Matheson	Huntington	New Rochelle	1904-06
MELODY	Ralph Middleton Munroe	Munroe & C. Brown	Miami & Coconut Grove, FL	1905
MICCO	Arthur M. Merriman	A.C. Brown & Son	Tottenville, S.I., NY	1891
NETHLA	Edward A. & Thomas A. Hine	A.C. Brown & Son	Tottenville, S.I., NY	1888
NEW DAWN	Murrough Armstrong-MacDonnell	Murrough Armstrong-MacDonnell	Devon, England	1981
Nicketti	Jean d'Hedouville (Count)	A.C. Brown & Son	Tottenville, S.I., NY	1889
NORMONA	S.M. Taylor	A.C. Brown & Son	Tottenville, S.I., NY	1903
NOVIA	George Van Vleck, Toledo	A.C. Brown & Son	Tottenville, S.I., NY	1904
ORIOLE	Commodore T.B. Austen	A.C. Brown & Son	Tottenville, S.I., NY	1888
Pelican	Edward A. & Thomas Hine	A.C. Brown & Son	Tottenville, S.I., NY	1885
Petrel	Ralph Middleton Munroe	Ralph Middleton Munroe	nr. Townsend's Dock, Staten Island	1879
PRESTO	Ralph Middleton Munroe	A.C. Brown & Son	Tottenville, S.I., NY	1885
SAVALO	F. Gray Griswold	A.C. Brown & Son	Tottenville, S.I., NY	1901
Savanilla	John Price Wetherill	Greenwich Piers Marine Railway Co.	Greenwich Piers, NJ	1904
Scallop	Louis Quint Jones	Gas Engine & Power, & Charles L. Seabury & Co.	Morris Heights, NYC, NY	1906
Skipperee				1881
Star	Clemson	Peck & Bailey	Miami, FL	1903
Sunset	Ralph Middleton Munroe	Ralph Middleton Munroe	Coconut Grove, FL	1923
Tommy Traddles	Vincent Hubbell	Gas Engine & Power & Seabury	Morris Heights, NY	1906
Totem	Thomas A. Hine	A.C. Brown & Son	Tottenville, S.I., NY	1907
TRAMP	Bancroft C. Davis	F.F. Pendleton	Wiscasset, ME	1914
UTILIS	Ralph Middleton Munroe	A.C. Brown & Son	Tottenville, NY	1894
UTILIS II	Montgomery			1901
UTILIS III	Winslow	Not built		Designed 1902
WABUN	Will McCormick	A.C. Brown & Son	Tottenville, S.I., NY	1892
YUMA	Ralph Worthington	Miami Boats Works	Miami, FL	1904
?#1	Higgs	Not built		1894
?#2	Thornton, W.	Not built		1899
?#3		Not built		1903
?#4	Camden	Not built		1905
?#5	Griswold	Not built		1906
?#6	Park	Not built		1906
?#7	Matheson	Not built		1907

Note Those in CAPITALS are PRESTO style boats.
