= The Barnacle Historic State Park =

Florida State Park

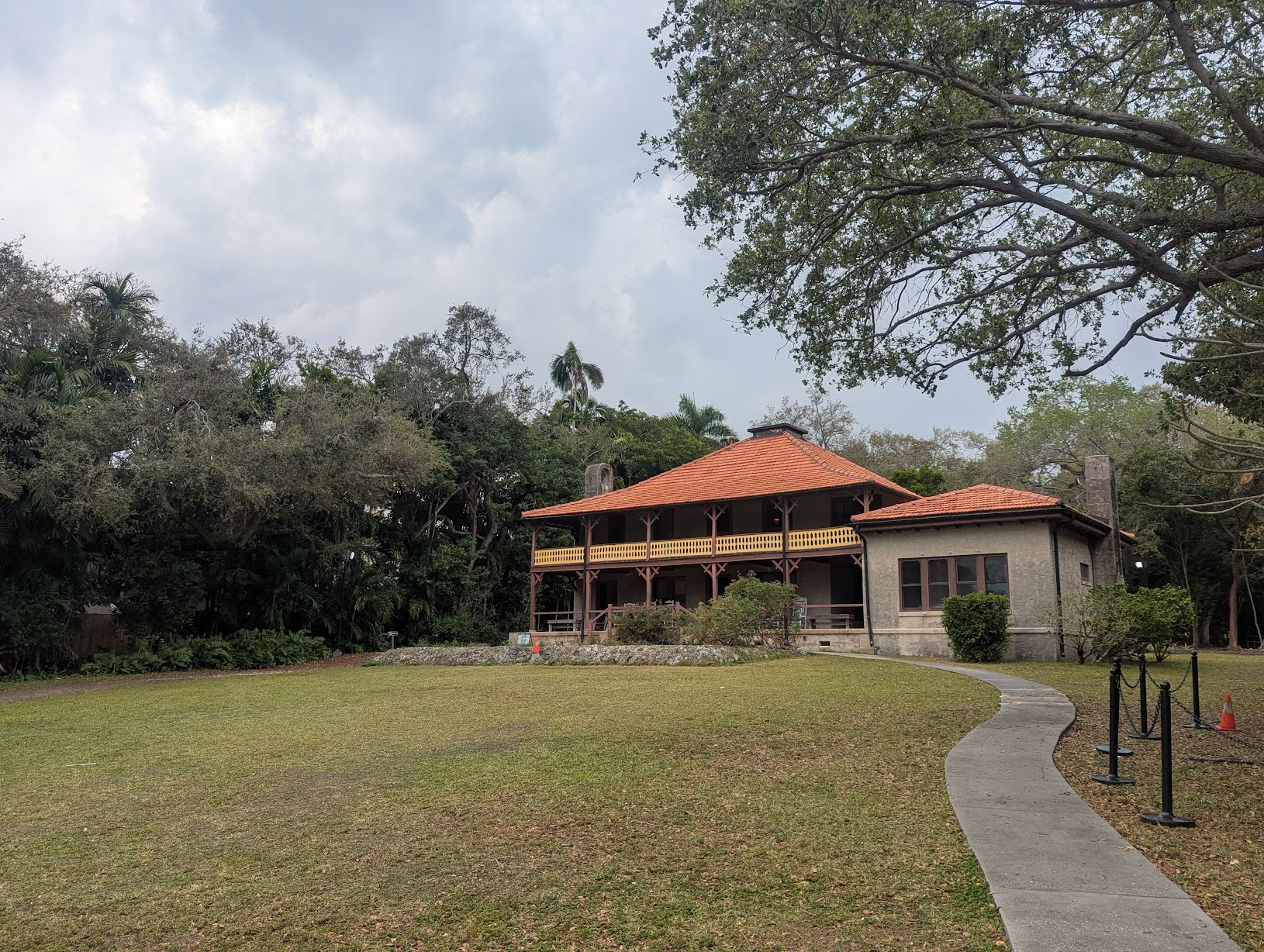
- The Barnacle in 2026

- Location within Florida Location within the United States
- Interactive map of The Barnacle Historic State Park
- Location: Coconut Grove, Miami, Florida, United States
- Coordinates: 25°43′30″N 80°14′32″W
- Area: 5 acres (2.0 ha)
- Created: 1973
- Governing body: Florida State Parks
- Operator: Florida Department of Environmental Protection
- Website: The Barnacle Historic State Park

The Barnacle Historic State Park is a 5-acre (2.0 ha) Florida State Park in the Coconut Grove neighborhood of Miami, Florida at 3485 Main Highway.

Built in 1891, it is the oldest house in its original location in Miami-Dade County. The Barnacle was the home of Ralph Middleton Munroe, one of Coconut Grove's founders, as well as founder and Commodore of the Biscayne Bay Yacht Club. He was also a leading designer of sailing yachts. The Florida Park Service acquired the remaining 5 acres (20,000 m^{2}) of Munroe's original 40-acre (160,000 m^{2}) homesite from his descendants in 1973.

The Barnacle Historic State Park is served by the Miami Metrorail at the Douglas Road and the Coconut Grove stations.

== History ==
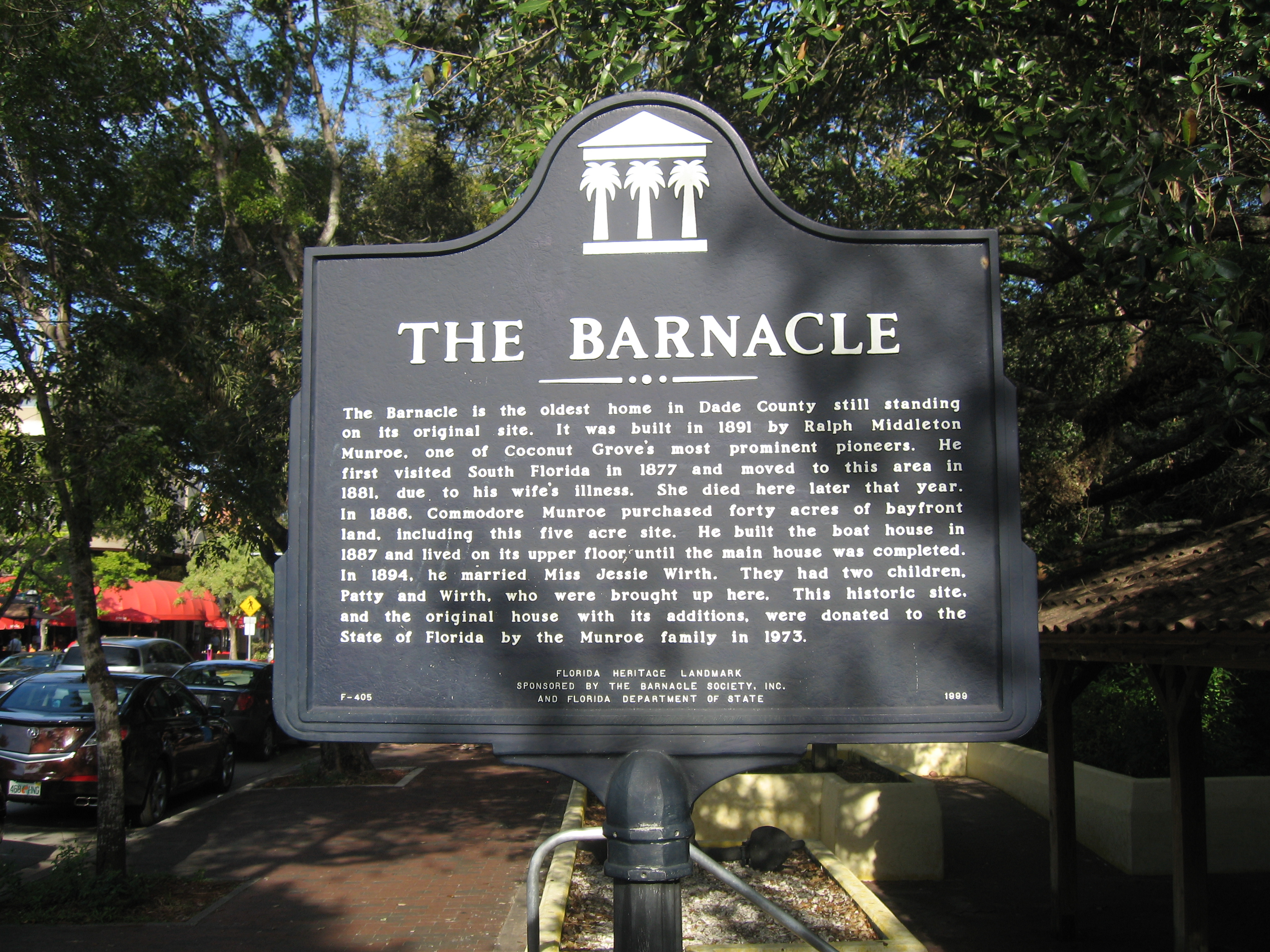
Historic marker at front entrance on Main Highway

Ralph Middleton Munroe first visited South Florida in 1877 while on vacation from New York City. On his second trip he brought his wife who suffered from tuberculosis. Unfortunately, the cure failed and she died. Her body is buried in Coconut Grove. He returned several times to the area and in 1887 decided to settle in the Bay.

Ralph Munroe purchased 40 acres (160,000 m^{2}) of bayfront land in 1886 for $400 in addition to one of his sailboats, the Kingfish, valued at an additional $400. His boathouse was built in 1887 and he lived on its upper floor until his main house was completed in 1891. The house, a one-story structure, was raised off the ground on wood pilings. Its central room is octagonal in shape and Munroe called his home "The Barnacle," presumably because it resembled one. It remained a bungalow until 1908 when more space was needed for his growing family. The whole structure was lifted and a new first story inserted below. In 1912 a library was built adjacent to the house. The Barnacle survived the disastrous 1926 hurricane and Hurricane Andrew in 1992 with only minimal damage.

Ralph Munroe's principal passion in life was designing yachts. Boats were the major form of transportation in the early days of Coconut Grove and yachting was a popular sport. Many South Floridians commissioned Munroe to design their yachts. In 1887, a group of residents formed the Biscayne Bay Yacht Club, electing Munroe as Commodore, a title that he held for 22 years. In his lifetime, he drew plans for 56 different yachts. Micco, one of the last of Munroe's boats, was displayed at the park until Hurricane Andrew reduced the 101-year-old vessel to fragments. Egret, a replica of Munroe's 28-foot (8.5 m) modified sharpie is now moored offshore.

As a seaman, civic activist, naturalist, and photographer, Commodore Munroe was a man who cherished the natural world around him. A walk into the park passes through a tropical hardwood hammock. It is representative of the original landscape within the city of Miami. Today, it is one of the last remnants of the once vast Miami Hammock.

=== Regatta ===
In the spring of 1887 Ralph Munroe organized a regatta on Biscayne Bay with fifteen boats divided into three classes. "The winners were Ada (Captain Brickell), Maggie (Captain Carney) and Edna (Captain Addison), while Alfred Munroe and Charles Peacock were timekeepers and judges. After the race all hands, about fifty in number, participated in a good dinner at Peacock's (the Peacock Inn), given by the promoters. Thus began organized aquatic sports on the Bay, the Washington's Birthday Regatta afterwards being a fixture of the Biscayne Bay Yacht Club, until the displacement of sails by gasoline in general interest caused it to degenerate into a "Chowder-party".

=== Timeline: Early history of the site ===
- Before 1846: Largely unused, like most of South Florida, until the Seminole Wars forced Seminoles into this area. Spanish expeditions may have explored the bay on mapping expeditions, but any inland explorations are purely speculative.
- 1846: Land first surveyed.
- 1868, November 14: Edmund Beasley files claim for site under the Homestead Act. May have dug well on site. Built a small house later called the Three Sisters Cottage about this time.
- 1870: Beasley dies, leaves site to his wife, Anna.
- 1872: Site rented to Dr. Horace Porter.
- 1873, January 6: Porter establishes a post office, which he calls Cocoanut Grove.
- 1873, July: Porter unsuccessfully attempts to claim site under the Homestead Act, claiming that it had been abandoned by the Beasleys.
- 1875, May 20: Mrs. Beasley gains clear title to the site.
- 1877: Mrs. Beasley sells site to John W. Frow, lighthouse keeper at Cape Florida, for $100.00.
- 1886: Ralph Munroe purchases 40 acres (160,000 m^{2}) for $400.00 plus the boat "Kingfish" which he values at $400.00.
- 1887: First Washington's Birthday Regatta held.

=== Timeline: History of the Barnacle ===
- 1887: Ralph Munroe builds boathouse with living quarters on upper floor and workshop on lower floor.
- 1891, Summer: Ralph begins constructing the Barnacle house.
- 1895: Ralph marries Jessie Wirth.
- 1900: Daughter, Patty, born. Jessie's sister, Josephine, joins household to help with child.
- 1902: Son Wirth Middleton Munroe is born.
- 1903: Northwest corner of house expanded.
- 1908: House raised and first floor added.
- 1913: House electrified and library added.
- 1916: Indoor bathrooms added to northeast corner of first floor and area off of Mr. & Mrs. Munroe's bedroom with water tank on second floor.
- 1926: Original boathouse destroyed in hurricane. House sustains minor damage. Boathouse later rebuilt along lines substantially like those of original.
- 1928: House assumes present day form by enclosing porches on sides of house on both floors and extending library and kitchen.
- 1932: Patty marries William Catlow, moves to New Jersey.
- 1933: Wirth marries Mary Poore.
- 1933, August 20: Ralph dies at age 82. Buried in Sleepy Hollow Cemetery in Concord, MA.
- 1940: Jessie dies, Wirth and Mary move into house with their children, Charles and William.
- 1959: Sarah Josephine Wirth (Aunt Dodie) dies.
- 1968: Wirth Munroe dies.
- 1973: Munroe family sells site to the State of Florida.
- 1988: Used as the backdrop to the finale of the Miami Vice TV episode 'Deliver Us From Evil' (first aired 29 April 1988). The house was portrayed as the Caribbean island hideaway of career criminal Frank Hackman, who tricked Det. Sonny Crockett into getting him released from death row, and later murdered Crockett's wife. Crockett successfully tracked Hackman to the house and avenged his wife's death by shooting Hackman in cold blood. The dramatic scene concludes with Crockett walking towards the water's edge and showing a vista of the property with the dead Hackman slumped over in a lawn chair.
- 1992: Hurricane Andrew heavily damages boathouse, destroys one of the last surviving Munroe boats, the "Micco", but house receives only very minor damage.
- 1994: Site of the final answer in the 1994 Tropic Hunt, just before reopening to the public.

== Activities ==
Daytime activities include touring the historic site, picnicking, and wildlife viewing. Concerts and other events are held frequently throughout the year, making it a popular destination in Miami.

== Location and parking ==
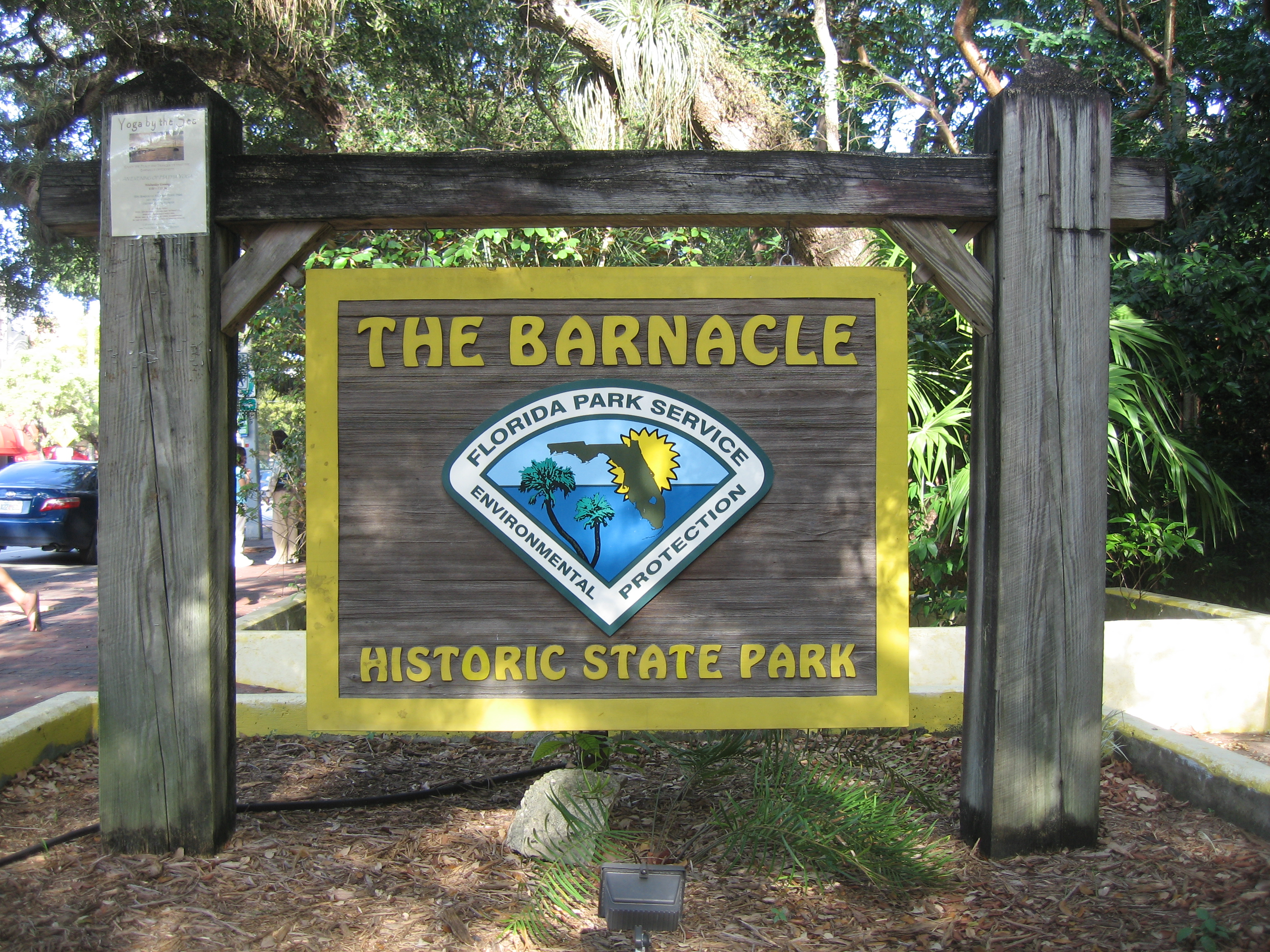
Sign at front entrance on Main Highway

The entrance is on the Northbound side of Main Highway between Abitare and The Cloister Townhomes. There is no parking available in the park itself, except for those with disabilities. However, there is a public parking lot next to the Coconut Grove playhouse and street parking throughout the neighborhood.
