= Sharpie (boat) =

Type of hard chined sailboat

35ft New Haven Oyster Sharpie, built about 1890

Sharpies are a type of hard chined sailboat with a flat bottom, extremely shallow draft, centreboards and straight, flaring sides. They are believed to have originated in the New Haven, Connecticut region of Long Island Sound, United States. They were traditional fishing boats used for oystering, and later appeared in other areas. With centerboards and shallow balanced rudders they are well suited to sailing in shallow tidal waters.

== Traditional sharpies ==
=== New Haven sharpies ===
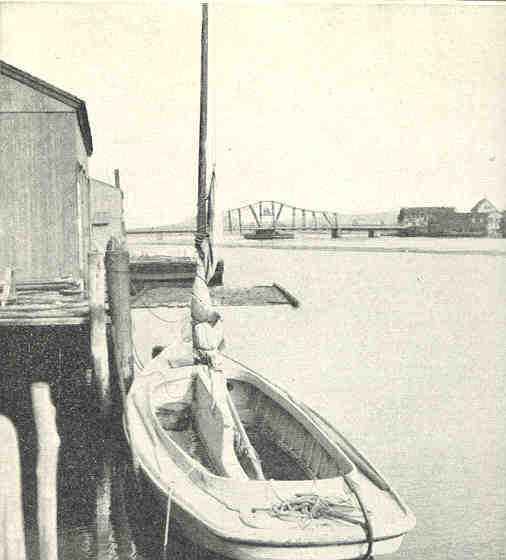
Oyster Sharpie, Quinipiac River, Connecticut

Sharpies first became popular in New Haven, Connecticut, towards the end of the 19th century. They came into use as a successor to the dugout log canoe and most likely were derived from the flatiron skiff. In an 1879 edition of Forest and Stream, a man named James Goodsell of the Fair Haven neighborhood claimed to have built the first sharpie with his brother in 1848. His claim was never contested. The Goodsell & Rowe Oyster Barn is shown on Front Street in an 1850 Map of Fair Haven which is now in Yale's Beinecke Rare Book and Manuscript Library. That map shows the homes of E.P. Goodsell, J. D. Goodsell, and J. J. Goodsell also on Front Street.

Building Sharpies was a spin-off business from oystering and continued to grow, meeting not only local needs but were sold to other oystermen along the Eastern seaboard. The names of Rowe, Graves and Thatcher became well known as sharpie builders by the 1880s.

Sharpies were typically used for oyster tonging and evolved to suit that work. They grew in popularity because they were easy to row, cheap to build, and fast under sail. They were used for racing. The sailing speed was eleven nautical miles in thirty-four minutes. By the 1880s nearly 200 sharpies were to be found along the wharves of Fair Haven alone.

Varying in length, the 24–28 ft one-man boats usually had one sail, while the larger two-man boats which were around 35 ft were rigged with two sails, as cat-ketches. They had leg-o-mutton sails with sprit booms on un-stayed masts. The larger boats had three mast-steps; one at the bow, one amidships and one in between. Typically, in the summer, two masts would be stepped: one at the bow and amidships. In the winter, when heavier winds were expected, a single mast would be stepped in between. Their hulls were narrow with a large sheer and low freeboard. At the ends you will find a plumb bow with the heel of the stem sitting just out of the water and a round stern. The centerboard was long and shallow as was the balanced rudder.

=== Migration ===
The sharpie type migrated south and west to other regions where shallow water prevented deep-draft vessels from operating, including Chesapeake Bay, the Carolinas, the Great Lakes (Ohio) and Florida.

Although most sharpies were rigged as a leg-o-mutton cat-ketch with free standing masts and sprit booms, larger versions – especially those found in the Carolinas and Florida – used stayed gaff schooner rigs which included a jib.

=== Further development and variations ===
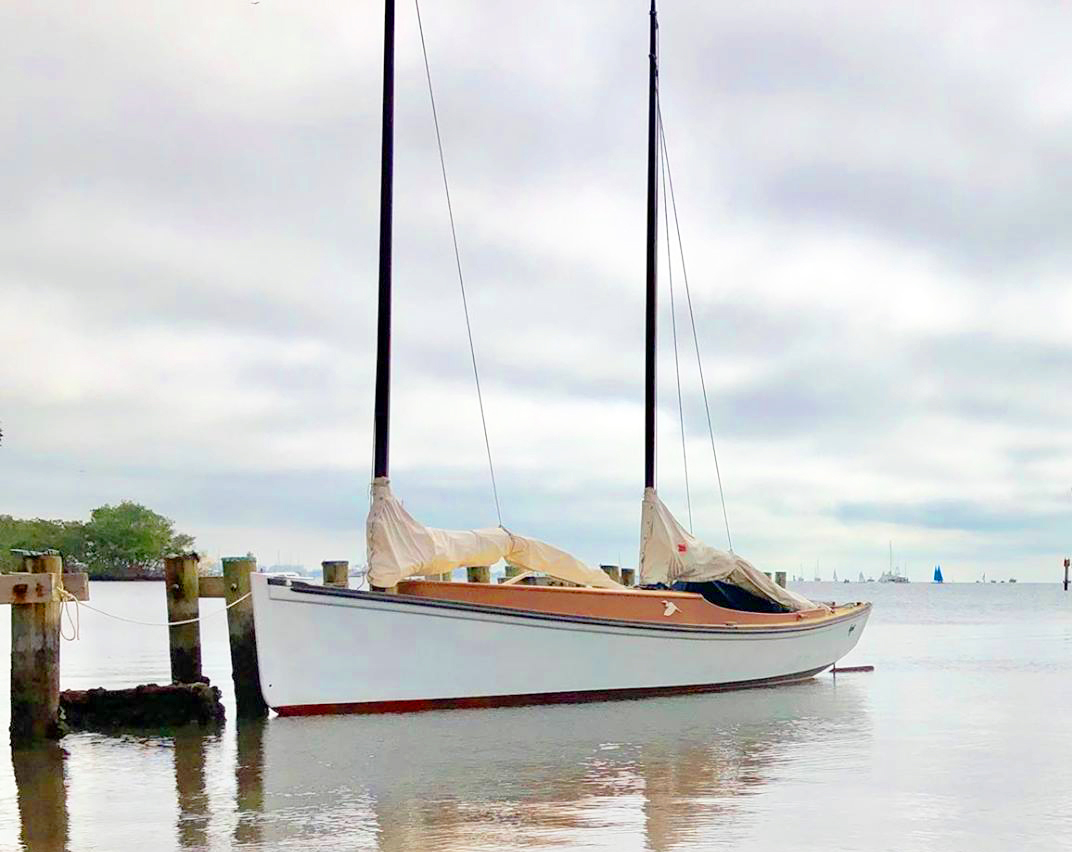
Egret replica at The Barnacle Historic State Park, Miami, Florida

Sharpies were introduced to Florida in 1881, when Commodore Ralph Munroe brought the 33-foot New Haven style sharpie, of his own design, Kingfish to the Miami area of Florida. Perhaps the most famous of sharpies was the Commodore's Egret design, now immortalized in plans available from WoodenBoat magazine. Commodore Monroe designed Egret in 1886 and had her built on Staten Island and delivered to Key West.

Egret was unique in that she had higher, flaring sides than the typical sharpie and was double-ended. This meant more stability as she was loaded and the ability to run before a following sea without waves breaking over the stern. These attributes contributed to behavior that led the Commodore to call the Egret a "sharpie-lifeboat".

Throughout the late 19th century, the Commodore and others helped to evolve the type. Various sharpie yachts were designed by those who found the lines of working sharpies appealing. Thomas Clapham used a v-bottom in his "Nonpareil sharpies", and Larry Huntington introduced a rounded, arc bottom that has been used by modern designers like Bruce Kirby and Reuel Parker. Some believe the Chesapeake Bay skipjack with its v-bottom may have evolved from the early sharpies. Whatever the case, Chesapeake sharpie skiffs were common, especially in the smaller sizes, because of their easy and cheap construction.

Howard I. Chapelle, a naval architect and curator of maritime history, wrote several books on traditional work boats and boat building, some of which include sharpie design and construction. He was a particular advocate of pleasure boats based on work boat models and designed many sharpie sailboats, cruisers and yachts.

== Modern sharpies ==
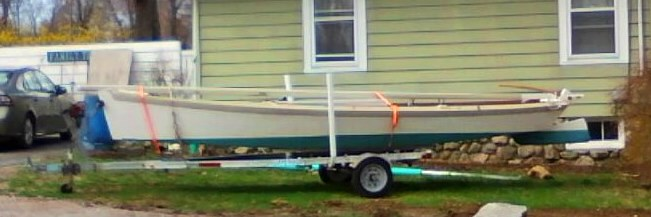
19-foot Ohio sharpie, Reuel Parker design. A modern sharpie design based on traditional lines

In recent years, the sharpie, as with many traditional American small craft, has enjoyed renewed interest as designers and sailors have sought boats with the virtues of shallow draft and ease of construction. However, most are home-built or of one-off construction. Exceptions include Bruce Kirby's Norwalk Islands series of sharpies, Catbird 24 by Chesapeake Marine design, Johns Sharpie by Chesapeake Light Craft, Ted Brewer's Mystic Sharpie, various designs by Parker Marine, and Phil Bolger's unique designs.

== Design considerations ==
Like dories, sharpies are initially tender since they have a shallow draft without a keel. They need large amounts of ballast stowed on the central floor before they become acceptable as sea boats: 600 to 900 lbs is normal in a 30 ft boat. Sharpies rely on their high flared topsides to provide stability when heeled on a reach or to windward. The twin unstayed masts makes rigging very easy and saves on cost. The unstayed flexible masts also allow wind to be spilled from the sails which helps with stability. The flat bottom, narrow water line and ample working sail means the boat is fast down wind where the flat bottom helps promote surfing or planing in stronger winds. The narrow beam, the high center of gravity, the low aspect ratio of the centre board and the longitudinal rudder shape do not help windward performance, but mostly these same features help in shallow waters or where the boat has to change direction often, such as in a tidal or rocky estuary. Cabin sharpies are an acquired taste due to the space taken up by the large central centerboard case and the restricted headroom. Even a 30-foot traditional sharpie is only suited to a maximum of 2 people when cruising for a week. A sharpie does not have the strong self-righting ability of a more conventional deep keeled yacht, so it is best suited to sheltered waters. It needs an experienced skipper who understands the foibles of the design.

Sharpie style hulls that are developed in New Zealand are made of plywood, use water ballast in underseat tanks that empty when trailered, vertical (dagger) ballasted boards (about 80-100 lbs) type centerboards (hoisted with a simple 4:1 block arrangement led back to the cockpit) and are commonly about 20–24 feet LOA. They are not traditionally rigged, instead having conventional fractional sloop rigs. They went through a brief period of popularity in the 1980s and 1990s.

Designers such as Iain Oughtred have produced modern versions that incorporate many traditional features while addressing some of the drawbacks, in particular the replacement of the shallow, balanced rudder (which had a tendency to lead to wild and erratic steering in big following seas) with a more conventional transom-hung pivoting rudder blade. The Haiku design also has fully battened sails in an effort to improve windward performance. Oughtred offers the Haiku with either twin swinging centreboards, which give more interior room, at the expense of hydrodynamic efficiency, or a single central board, which takes up more space. At 30 feet long the Haiku is set up for a small family to cruise in sheltered waters.

Phil Bolger designed a rudimentary solution to the problem of hull slap at anchor, which effects flat bottom boats, by making a 3-foot long, oval shaped anti-slap pad of multiple layers of ply about 2 inches deep, which were then rounded into a shallow arc. The noise is the same as chine slap familiar to owners of deep-V powerboats at anchor. Other designers have made the forefoot deeper so that it is immersed in the water at rest. Owners have found that putting extra weight in the bow and lowering the centreboard when anchored at night reduces the noise which is accentuated by thinner ply and lighter overall construction.

== Gallery ==
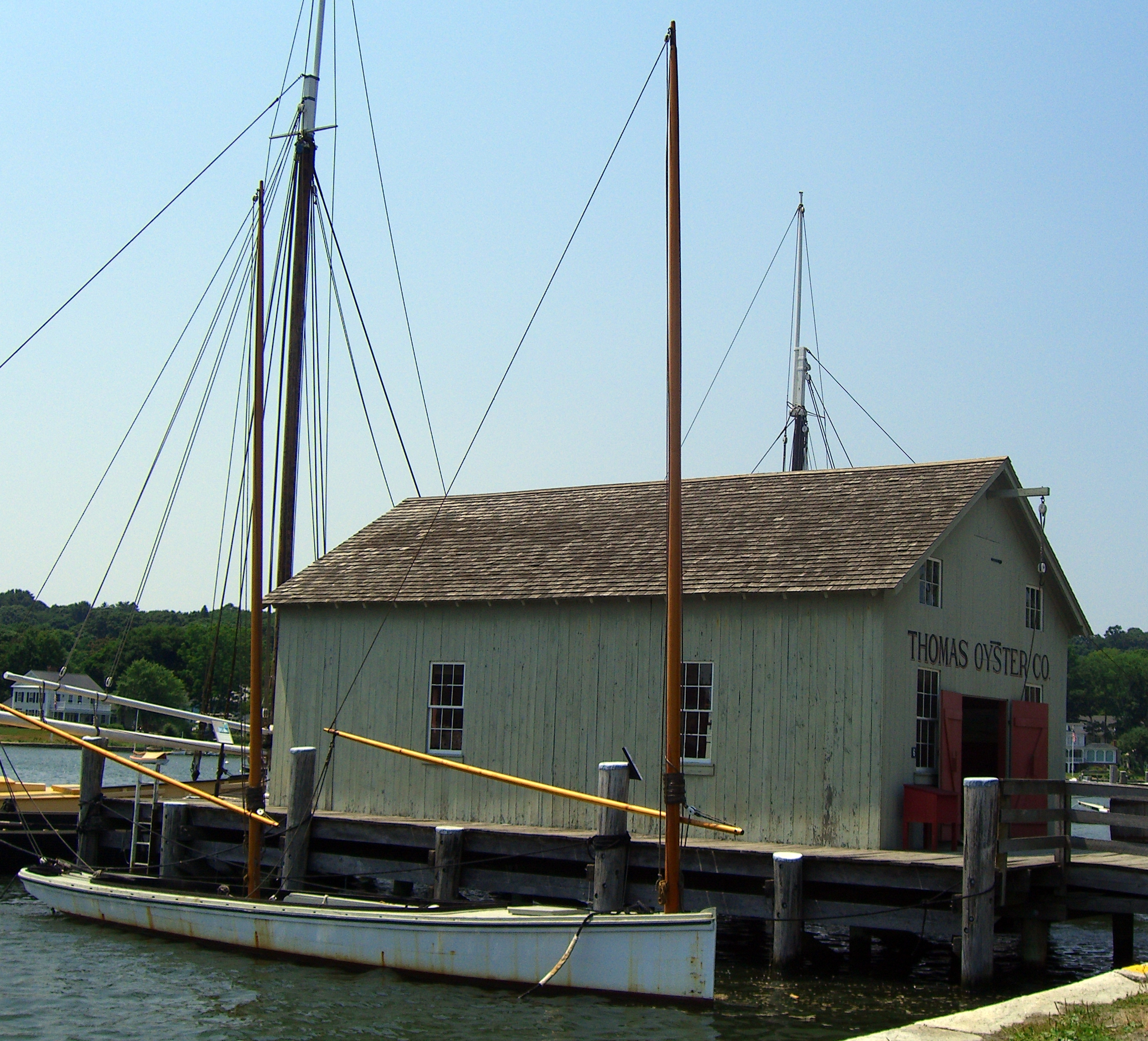
New Haven Oyster sharpie, Mystic Seaport, Connecticut

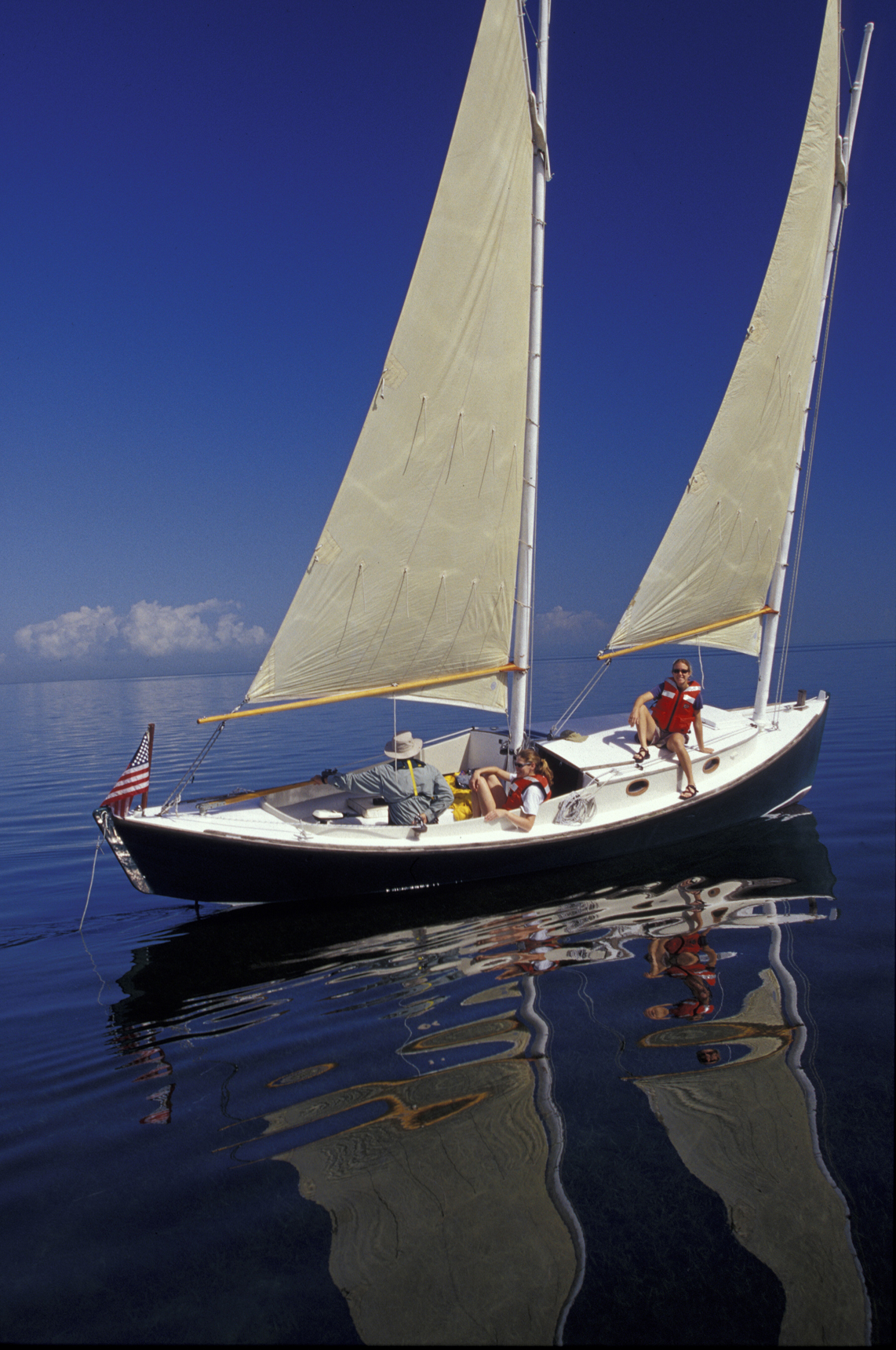
Egret-type sharpie sailing in Biscayne Bay, Florida

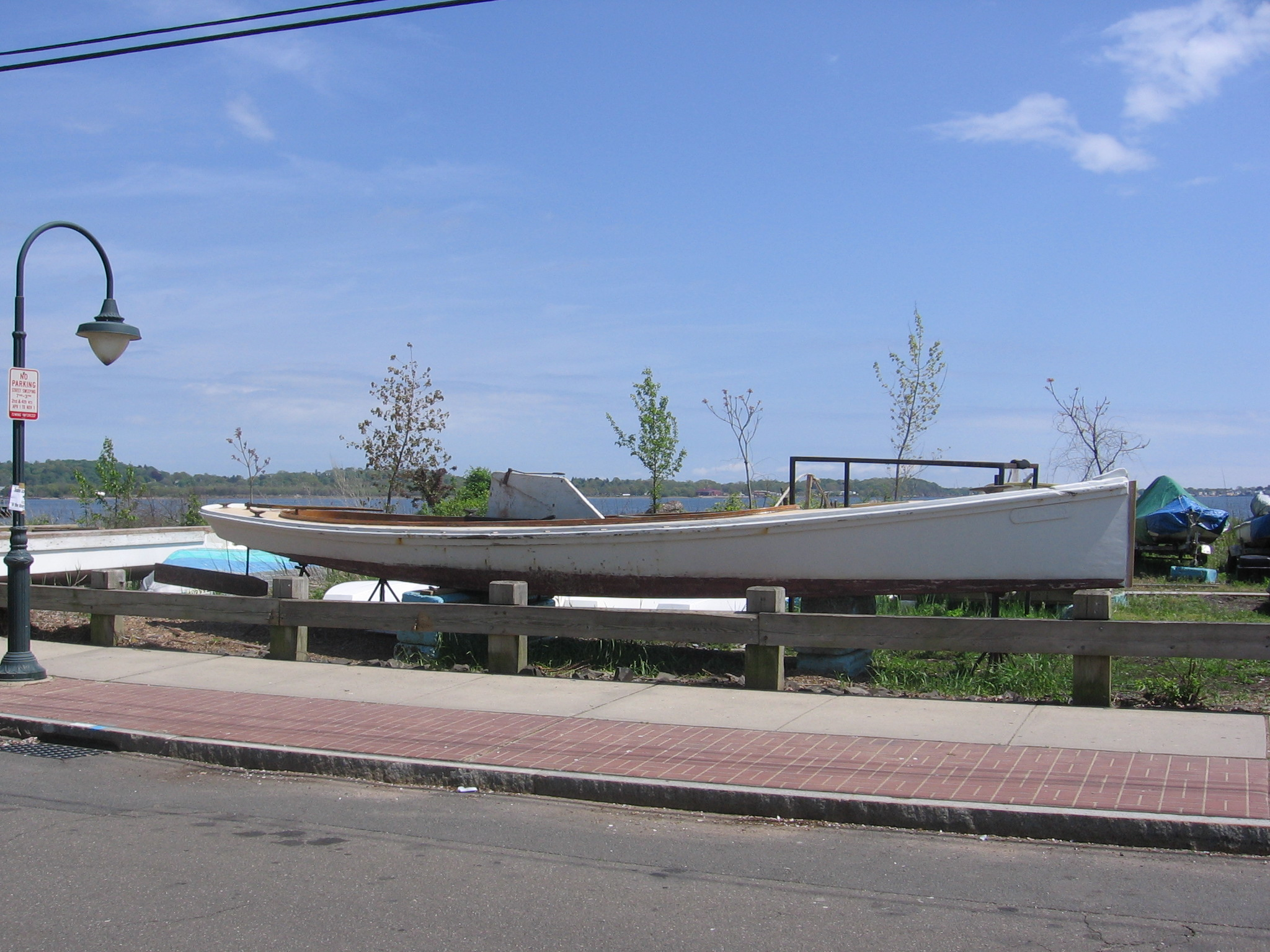
Hauled sharpie, New Haven, Connecticut

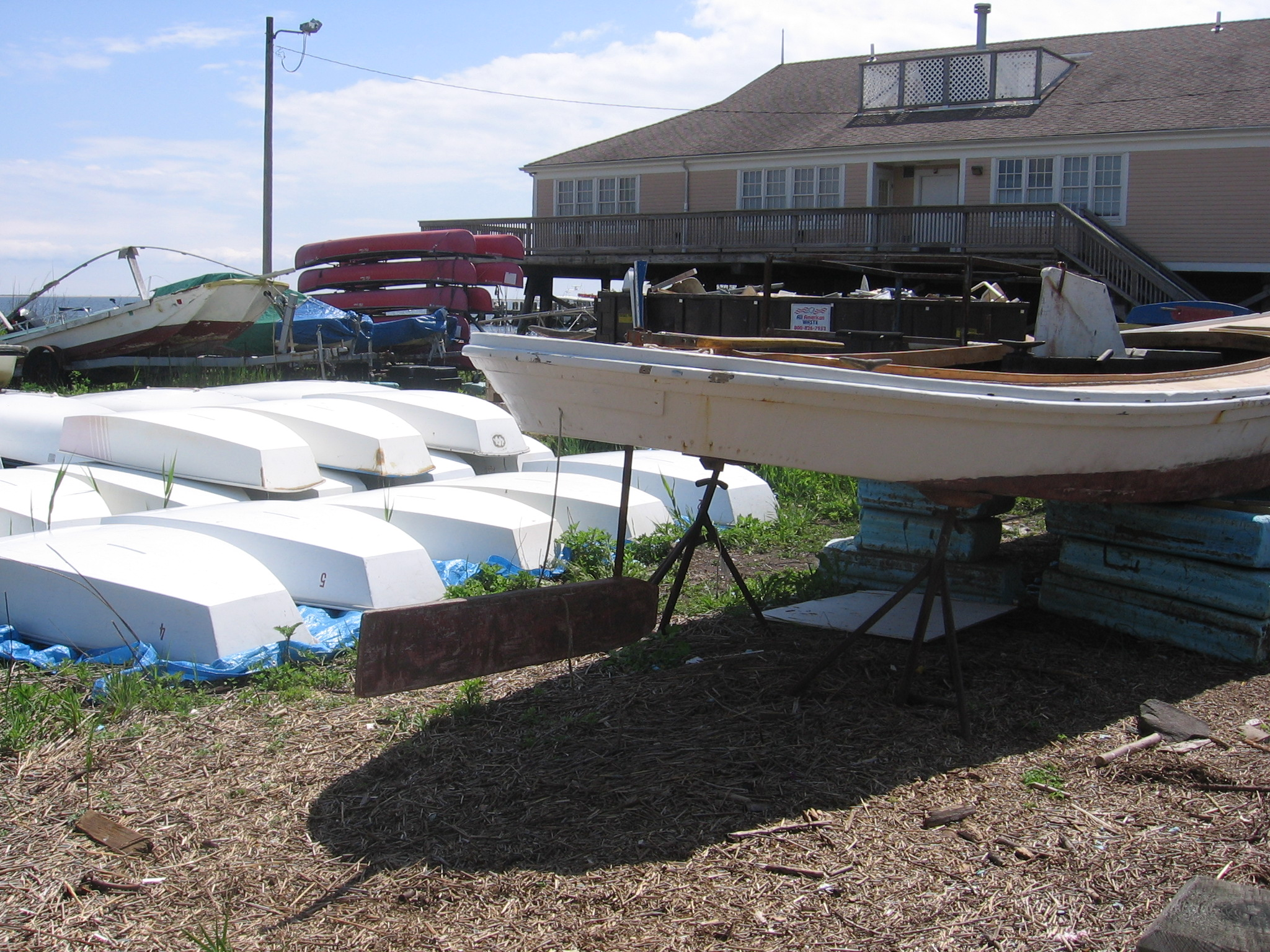
New Haven sharpie showing typical round stern and balanced rudder
