= Tommy Traddles (1906) =

Patrol vessel of the United States Navy

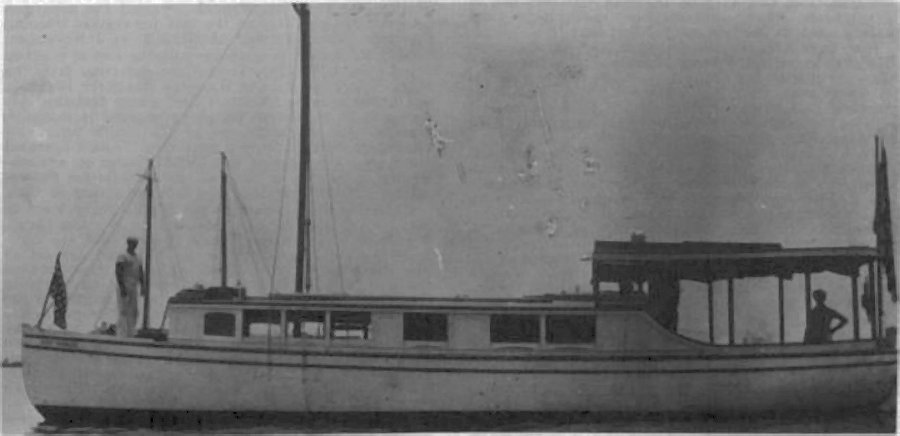

History

United States
- Name: Tommy Traddles
- Builder: Charles L. Seabury Company and Gas Engine and Power Company, Morris Heights, the Bronx, New York
- Launched: 1906
- Completed: 1906
- Acquired: Purchased 25 June 1917; Delivered 4 August 1917
- Commissioned: Never
- Fate: Returned to owner 4 September 1917
- Notes: No active naval service

General characteristics
- Length: 46 ft (14 m)
- Beam: 14 ft (4.3 m)
- Draft: 1 ft 10 in (0.56 m) mean
- Speed: 8 knots
- Complement: 7
- Armament: 1 × 1-pounder gun; 1 × machine gun

Tommy Traddles was a motorboat the United States Navy acquired for use as a patrol vessel in 1917 but never commissioned.

Tommy Traddles, designed by Ralph Munroe (1851–1933), was built as a private wooden-hulled cabin motor launch (or yacht) of the same name in 1906 by the Charles L. Seabury Company and Gas Engine and Power Company at Morris Heights in the Bronx, New York, for Vincent B. Hubbell. D. R. Hoornbeeck later purchased her from Hubbell. In 1915, Dr. J. B. Leffingwell of Bradenton, Florida, purchased her. On 25 June 1917, the U.S. Navy bought Tommy Traddles from Leffingwell for use as a section patrol boat during World War I. Leffingwell delivered her to the Navy on 4 August 1917.

Quickly deemed unsuitable for naval use, Tommy Traddles never received a section patrol (SP) number and was never commissioned. The Navy returned her to Leffingwell on 4 September 1917.
